= Australian Alps =

Bioregion in Australia

- Region
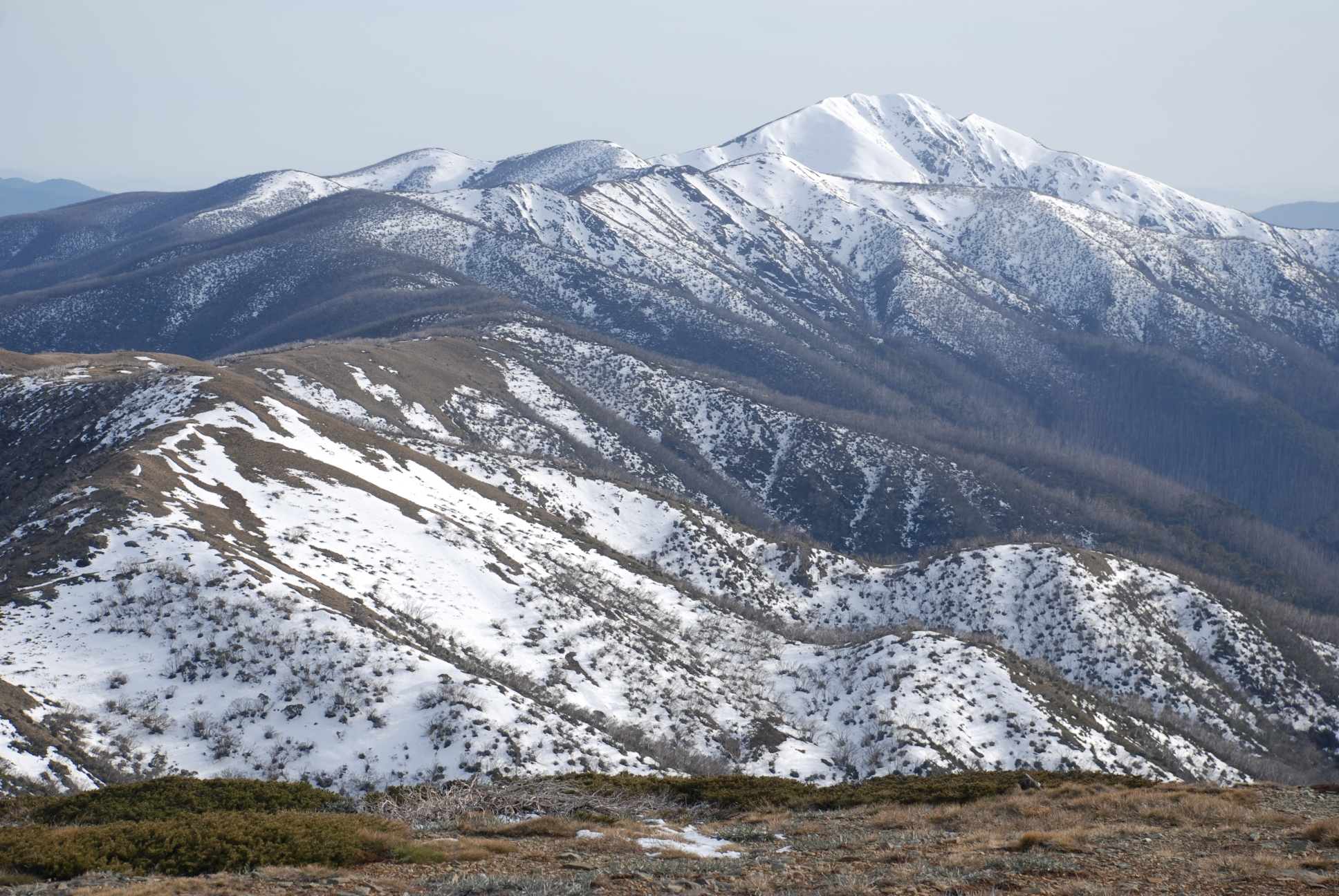
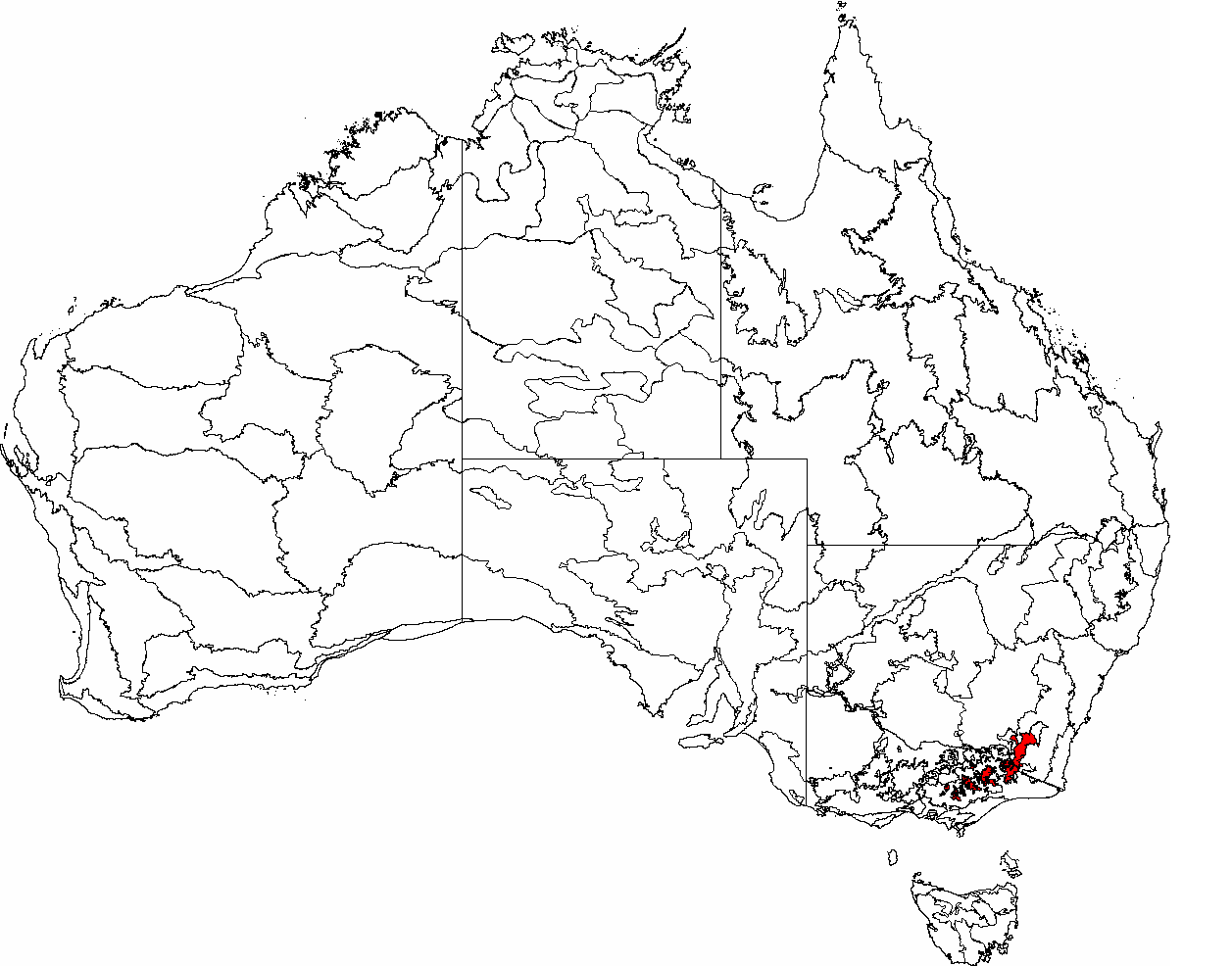
- Mount Feathertop, Victoria The interim Australian bioregions, with the Australian Alps in red
- Country: Australia
- State: Australia

Government
  - State electorates: Benambra; Brindabella; Gippsland East; Monaro; Ovens Valley
  - Federal divisions: Eden-Monaro; Gippsland; Riverina

Area
  - Total: 12,330 km^{2} (4,760 sq mi)
Regions around Australian Alps
NSW South Western Slopes	South Eastern Highlands	South Eastern Highlands
Riverina	Australian Alps	South East Corner
Victorian Midlands	South East Coastal Plain	South East Corner

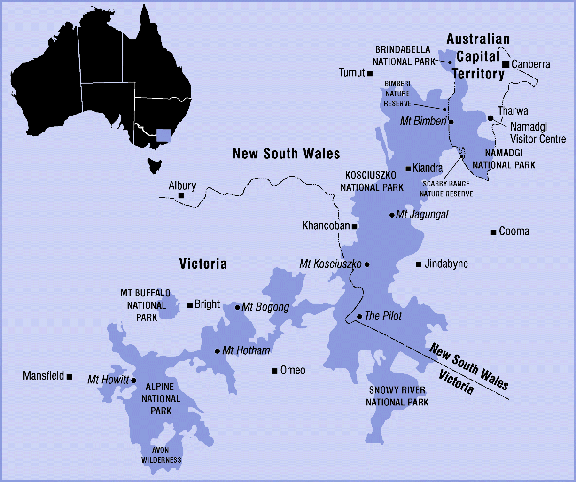
Map of Australian Alps

The Australian Alps are a mountain range in southeast Australia. The range comprises an interim Australian bioregion, and is the highest mountain range on mainland Australia. The range straddles the borders of eastern Victoria, southeastern New South Wales, and the Australian Capital Territory. It contains the only peaks exceeding 2,000 m (6,600 ft) in elevation on the Australian mainland, and is the only bioregion on the Australian mainland in which deep snow falls annually. The range comprises an area of 1,232,981 ha (3,046,760 acres).

The Australian Alps are part of the Great Dividing Range, the series of mountain and hill ranges and tablelands that runs about 3,000 km (1,900 mi) from northern Queensland, through New South Wales, and into the northern part of Victoria. This chain of highlands divides the drainage of the rivers that flow to the east into the Pacific Ocean from those that flow west into the drainage of the Murray–Darling Basin (and thence to the Southern Ocean) or into inland waters, such as Lake Eyre, which lie below sea level, or else evaporate rapidly.

The Australian Alps consist of two biogeographic sub regions: the Snowy Mountains, including the Brindabella Range, located in New South Wales and the Australian Capital Territory; and the Victorian Alps, located in Victoria. The latter region is also known as the "High Country", particularly within a cultural or historical context.

== Geology ==
Unlike the high mountain ranges found in places like the Rockies (highest peak 4,401 m (14,439 ft)), the European Alps (highest peak 4,808 m (15,774 ft)) or the Himalayas (highest peak 8,848 m (29,029 ft)), the Australian Alps were not formed by two continental plates colliding and pushing up the Earth's rocky mantle to form jagged, rocky peaks. Instead, the Australian Alps consist of a high plateau, with significantly softer rolling hills spread across a long, wide plateau that was lifted thousands of feet up by the movement of magma when Gondwana began to break up between 130 and 160 million years ago. The highest peak in the Australian Alps is Mount Kosciuszko (2,228 metres (7,310 ft)).

Formation of the Australian Alps was largely complete by around 100 million years ago, but during the past 90 million years, a number of minor uplift episodes occurred, with occasional eruptions of basalt lava from small volcanoes, which flowed across the landscape and down some of the valleys, filling in the low-lying areas to form the flat landscapes of these high plains.

During the Pleistocene ice age, commencing around 2 million years ago, when ice caps formed on many high ranges around the world, as well as at the poles, small glaciers were formed on the very highest parts of the Australian Alps, mostly in the vicinity of Mount Kosciuszko. Whilst no glaciers remain today, evidence of their past presence can be found in the numerous tarns and cirques found in that region, such as Club Lake, Blue Lake, and Hedley Tarn.

== Ecology ==
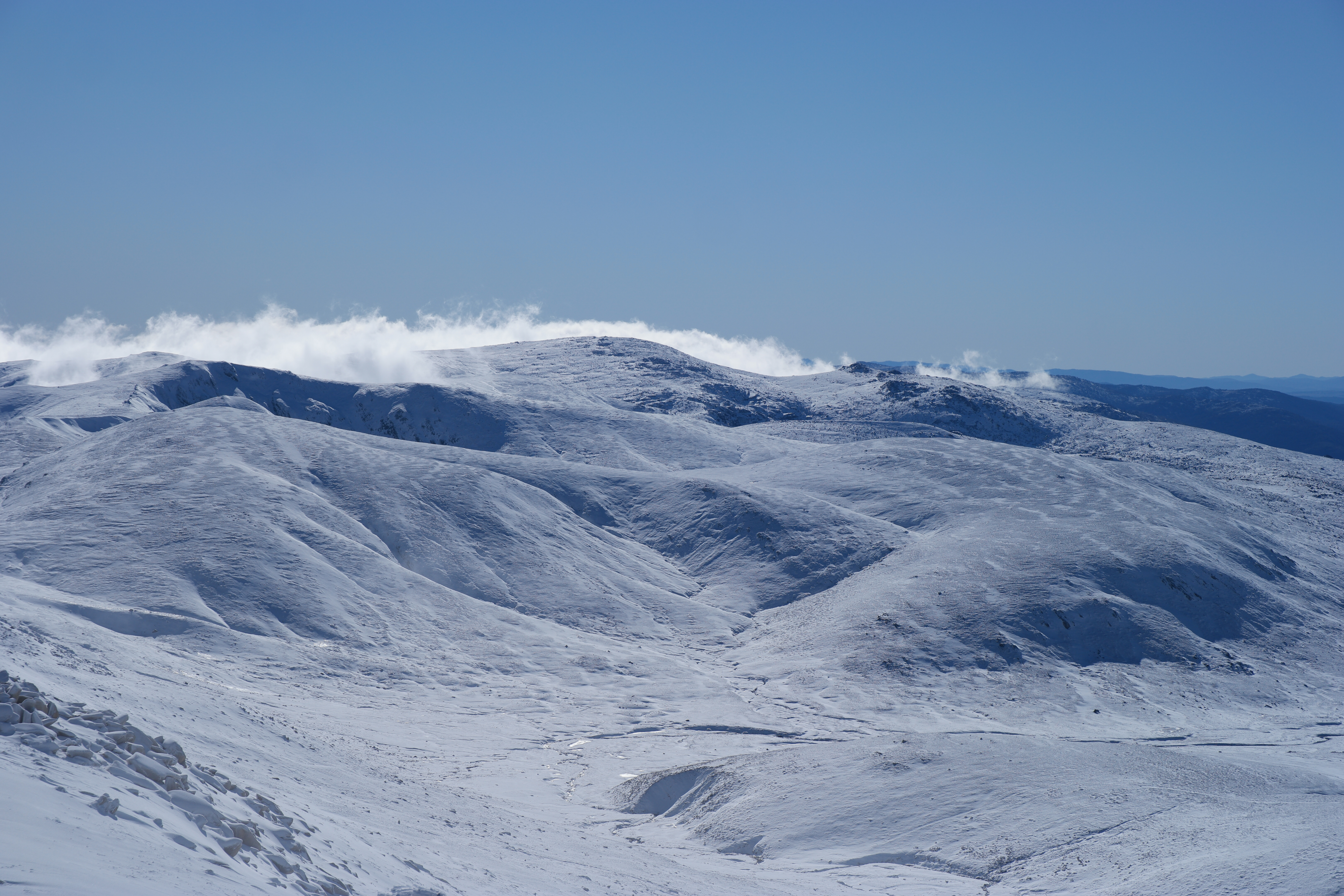
The Snowy Mountains region of New South Wales

The Australian Alps are important for conservation, recreation, and as a water drainage basin, with much of the range's eastern slopes having its runoff diverted artificially into the Murray River and its tributary the Murrumbidgee River through the civil engineering project of the Snowy Mountains Scheme.

The range's natural ecology is protected by large national parks, in particular the Kosciuszko National Park in New South Wales and the adjoining Alpine National Park in Victoria. These are managed cooperatively as the Australian Alps National Parks by agencies of the Australian government and the state governments of this region.

The Australian Alps also contain the only skiing areas of mainland Australia. Along with the town of Cabramurra, these are practically the only permanent settlements in the area. Several medium-sized towns can be found in the valleys below the foothills, such as Jindabyne, Corryong and Mount Beauty.

The Australian Alps are not as high or as steep as the European Alps, New Zealand's Southern Alps, or the Andes Mountains, and most of their peaks can be reached without using mountaineering equipment.

=== Wildlife ===
Hundreds of species of mammals, birds, reptiles, amphibians, and fish live in the Australian Alps. There are approximately 40 native mammals, 200 bird species, 30 reptile species, 15 amphibians, 14 native fish species, and a wide variety of invertebrates. Additionally, many non-native, feral species have been introduced to the Alps, such as the European rabbit, deer, house mice, red foxes, dogs, cats, horses, and pigs.

Among this wide variety of different species of wildlife, there are different habitat requirements for each of the mentioned species, regardless of whether it is native or introduced. In addition to rock outcrops and decaying logs, there is often vegetation that provides food and shelter or a combination of these factors. Consequently, topography, soil type, and temperature determine the type of vegetation in an area and how animal populations are distributed.

=== Birds ===
The Australian Alps have been classified by BirdLife International as an Important Bird Area. The range's montane forests and woodlands support large breeding populations of flame robins and pilotbirds.

=== Insects ===
The bogong moth seasonally migrates long distances towards and from the Australian Alps and gregariously aestivates in caves and other sites throughout the mountain range during the summer to avoid high temperatures and lack of larval food resources. The moth is a food source for many species living within the region, such as the endangered mountain pygmy possum. However, the moth has also been a biovector of arsenic, transporting it from lowland feeding sites over long distances into the mountains, leading to the bioaccumulation of the element in the environment and animals in the mountain range.

=== Bushfires ===
Due to their relatively dry climate and relatively warm summers, bushfires occur often in the well-forested areas of the Australian Alps. The Alps, particularly on the Victorian side of the border (known as the Victorian Alps), are periodically subject to major bushfires and have been almost entirely burnt through by bushfires on various occasions, notably; Black Thursday in 1851, Black Friday (1939), and during fires in 2003 and 2006-07.

Certain native flora in Australia have evolved to rely on bushfires as a means of reproduction, and fire events are an interwoven and an essential part of the ecology of the continent. In some eucalypt and banksia species, for example, fire causes seed pods to open, allowing them to germinate. Fire also encourages the growth of new grassland plants. Other species have adapted to recover quickly from fire.

Nevertheless, damage to surrounding human habitations and native fauna can be extensive and occasionally catastrophic. The 2003 Canberra bushfires severely affected almost 70% of the Australian Capital Territory's pasture, forests (pine plantations), and nature parks. After burning for a week through the Brindabella Ranges above Canberra, the fires entered the suburbs of the city on 18 January 2003. Four people died and more than 500 homes were destroyed or severely damaged. The Victorian Black Saturday bushfires were particularly intense in parts of the Victorian High Country and destroyed several towns, including Kinglake and Marysville. The fires killed 173 people, Australia's highest-ever loss of life from a bushfire. Statewide, the fires burned out over 400,000 hectares and destroyed 2,029 properties.

== Alpine huts ==
Within the Australian Alps, the roughly 120 active alpine huts mostly date back to the early cattlemen's days, early skiing huts, and early research and surveying huts. Many of these have remained in use by fly fishers (seasonal), hikers, and skiing groups throughout the year. Most of these huts are maintained by volunteers through the Kosciuszko Huts Association and the local National Parks and Wildlife Service.

Some of the more noteworthy huts include Moscow Villa Hut, Valentine Hut, Seaman's Hut, and Mawsons Hut. In recent years many huts have been lost through lack of maintenance and bush fire, as occurred with the Pretty Plain Hut and Mount Franklin Chalet, which were destroyed by the Canberra bushfires of 2003.

== Attractions ==
- Australian Alps Walking Track is a long-distance walking trail through the alpine areas of Victoria, New South Wales, and the ACT. It is 655 km (407 mi) long, starting at Walhalla, Victoria and running through to Tharwa near Canberra.

New South Wales

- Mount Kosciuszko, Australia's highest peak at 2,228 m (7,310 ft) above sea level
- Kosciuszko National Park
- Snowy Mountains
- Alpine Way
- Barry Way
- Snowy Mountains Highway
- Snowy Mountains Scheme
  - Lake Eucumbene
  - Lake Jindabyne
- Yarrangobilly Caves
- Kiandra gold & skifields (where Skiing in Australia began in the 1860s).
- Trout fishing in New South Wales
- Skiing in New South Wales

Victoria

- Alpine National Park
- Avon Wilderness Park
- Baw Baw National Park
- Mount Buffalo National Park
- Mount Bogong, Victoria's highest peak at 1,986 metres (6,516 ft) above sea level
- Mount Feathertop
- Mount Skene scenic reserve
- Bogong High Plains
- Great Alpine Road
- National Alpine Museum
- Lake Tali Karng
- Skiing in Victoria

Australian Capital Territory

- Namadgi National Park
- Bimberi Nature Reserve
- Tidbinbilla Nature Reserve
- Bimberi Peak, the ACT's highest peak at 1,912 metres (6,273 ft) above sea level
- Tharwa Road
- Corin Forest
- Mount Franklin (Australian Capital Territory)
- Skiing in the Australian Capital Territory

== Resort skiing areas ==
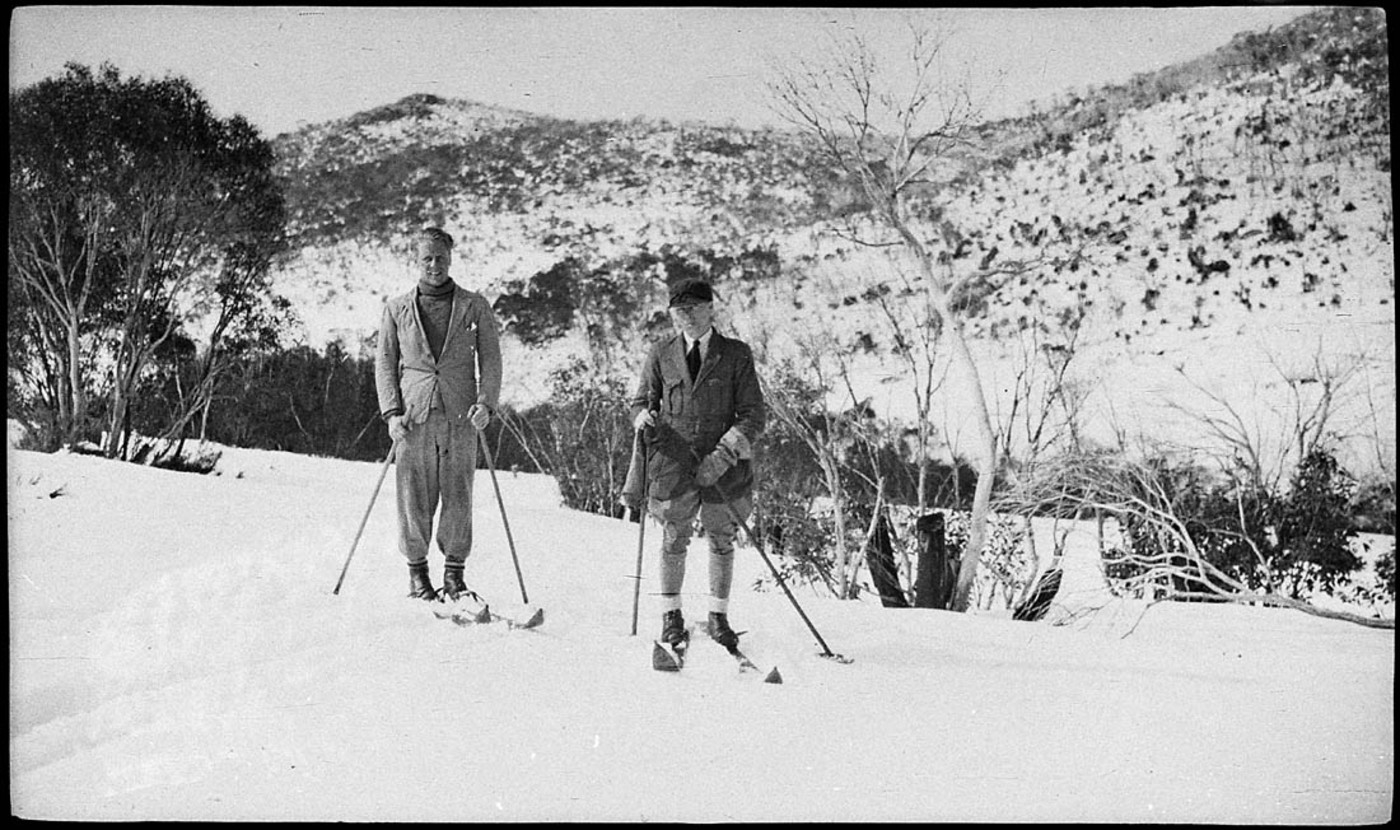
Skiing, Mt. Kosciusko, Australia, c. 1925, by Albert James Perier

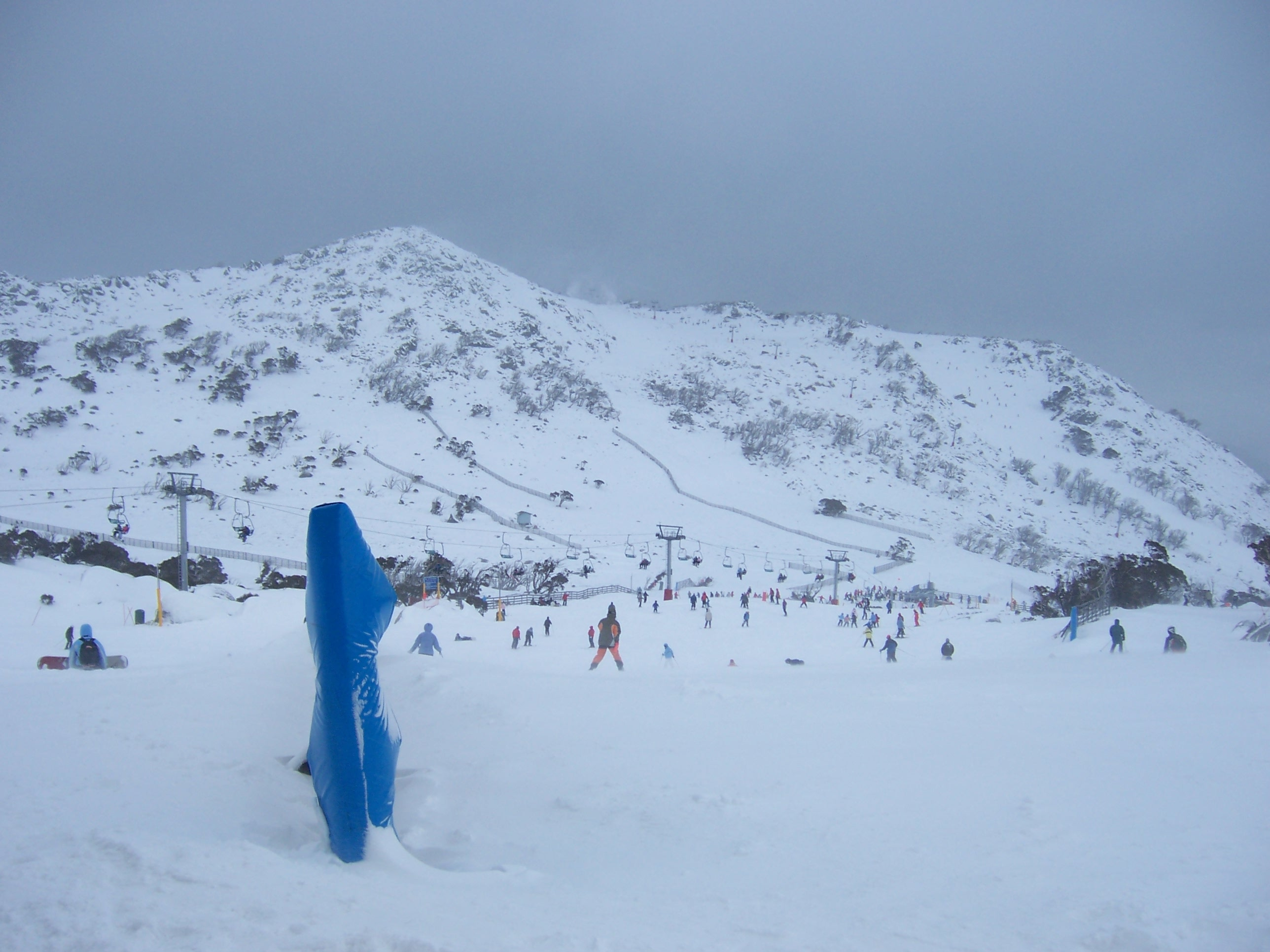
Perisher, New South Wales, is Australia's largest ski resort.

The Australian Alps are the main region in which skiing in Australia takes place (although skiing is also possible in Tasmania). Skiable terrain stretches through large areas of territory from June to October. New South Wales is home to Australia's highest snow country, oldest ski fields, and largest resort. Recreational skiing in Australia began around 1861 at Kiandra, New South Wales, when Norwegian gold miners introduced the idea to the frozen hills around the town. The first and longest-surviving ski club in the world, the Kiandra Snow Shoe Club, is believed to have been formed at Kiandra in that year. Steeper slopes and more reliable snows lie further to the south, and in the 20th century the focus of recreational skiing in New South Wales shifted southward, to mountains in and around the Kosciuszko Main Range region, where Australia's best vertical drop is found at Thredbo and Australia's biggest resort, Perisher is now found. The State of Victoria is the one with the largest number of skiing areas in Australia.

Mount Bogong, with its peak at 1986 m above sea level, is the highest peak in Victoria. The surrounding Bogong High Plains is one of the largest areas of snow country in Australia. It includes the leading resorts of Falls Creek and Mount Hotham. Recreational and practical skiing was being practised in the Victorian Alps by the 1880s and 1890s with skis made from local timbers, and making use of single steering poles. Skiing began at Mount Buffalo in the 1890s, and a chalet was constructed in 1910. Australia's first ski tow was constructed near Mount Buffalo in 1936.

Cross-country skiing is possible in the ACT, as well as in New South Wales and Victoria, but downhill skiing can only be done in New South Wales and Victoria:

New South Wales

- Perisher
  - Perisher Valley
  - Guthega
  - Mount Blue Cow
  - Smiggin Holes
- Thredbo
- Charlotte Pass
- Selwyn Snowfields

Victoria

- Mount Buller
- Falls Creek
- Mount Hotham
- Dinner Plain
- Mount Baw Baw
- Mount Buffalo
- Lake Mountain (cross country)
- Mount Stirling (cross country)
- Mount St Gwinear (cross country)
- Mount Donna Buang (snow play)

== Panoramas ==
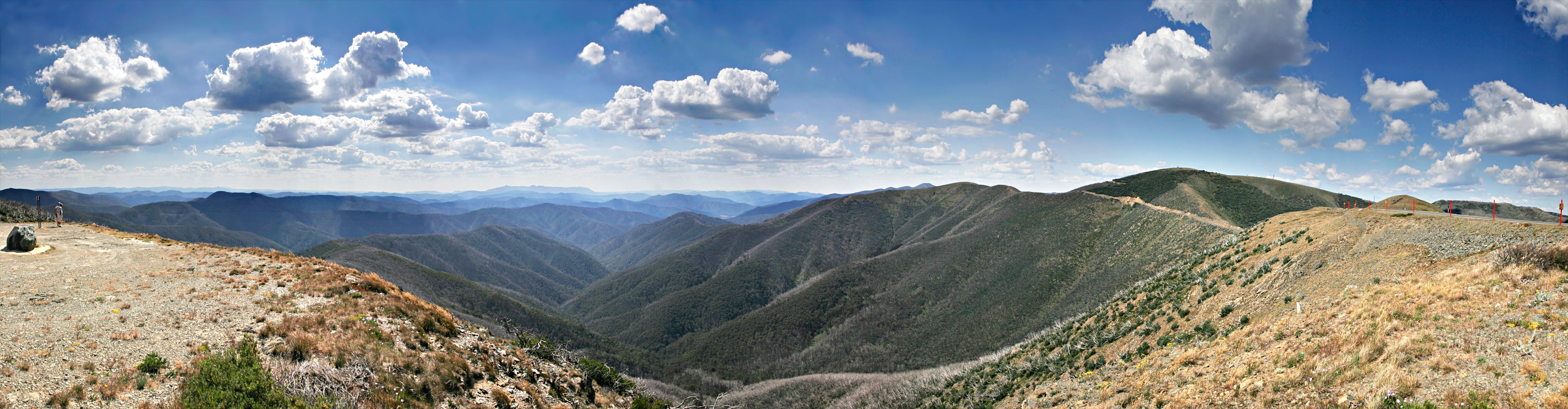
Summer view of the Victorian Alps from Mount Hotham
