= Valentine Falls =

- Location within New South Wales
- Location: Snowy Mountains, New South Wales, Australia
- Coordinates: 36°12′55″S 148°22′05″E
- Elevation: 1,600 metres (5,200 ft) AHD
- Watercourse: Valentine Creek

The Valentine Falls is a waterfall on the Valentine Creek in the Snowy Mountains region of New South Wales, Australia.

Located in the Kosciuszko National Park at an elevation of 1,600 metres (5,200 ft) above sea level, the falls are a short walk away from Valentine Hut. The waterfall flows in many sections with several pools.

== See also ==
- List of waterfalls
- List of waterfalls in Australia
