= Mount Jagungal =

Mountain in Australia

- Jagungal, Big Bogong or The Big Bogong Nr., or The Big Bogong Mountain
- Mount Jagungal in January 2010.

Highest point
- Elevation: 2,061 m (6,762 ft)
- Prominence: 266 m (873 ft)
- Coordinates: 36°09′S 148°23′E

Geography
- Location within New South Wales
- Location: New South Wales, Australia
- Parent range: Great Dividing Range
- Topo map: Jagungal

Mount Jagungal or sometimes Jagungal, Big Bogong, The Big Bogong Nr., or The Big Bogong Mountain, is a mountain within the Jagungal Wilderness Area of the Kosciuszko National Park in the Snowy Mountains region of New South Wales, Australia.

With an elevation of 2,061 metres (6,762 ft) above sea level, Mount Jagungal is the seventh-highest mountain in Australia and surpasses any elevation except for peaks in the Main Range and Gungartan (which is directly adjacent). Since it stands alone in an extensive plain Mount Jagungal is visible for many kilometres in all directions. Similarly, there is an excellent view from the top in all directions.

The Jagungal Wilderness Area is a large wilderness region north of the Main Range. Within this area there is some excellent alpine walking in summer and cross-country skiing in winter. As about 70% of the region is open grassland, it is possible to walk almost anywhere. The Alpine Hut, near Mount Jagungal was built in 1939 to cater for skiers. Access was arduous - via packhorse and ski. It burnt down in 1979.

== Gallery ==
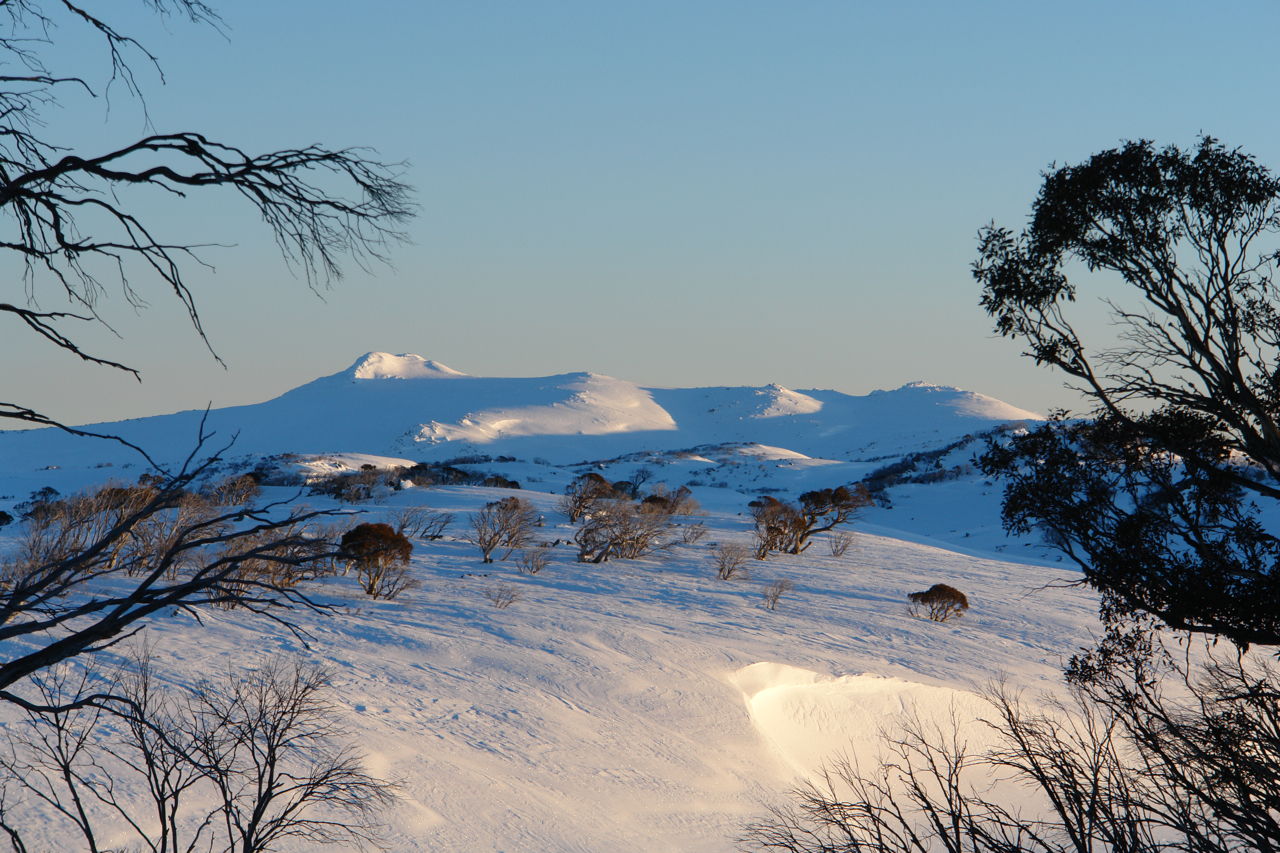
Mt Jagungal seen from near Mawson's Hut

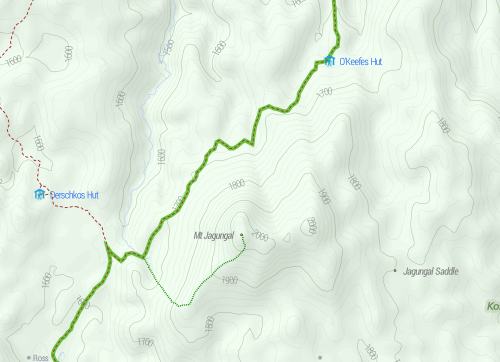
Map of Mt Jagungal.

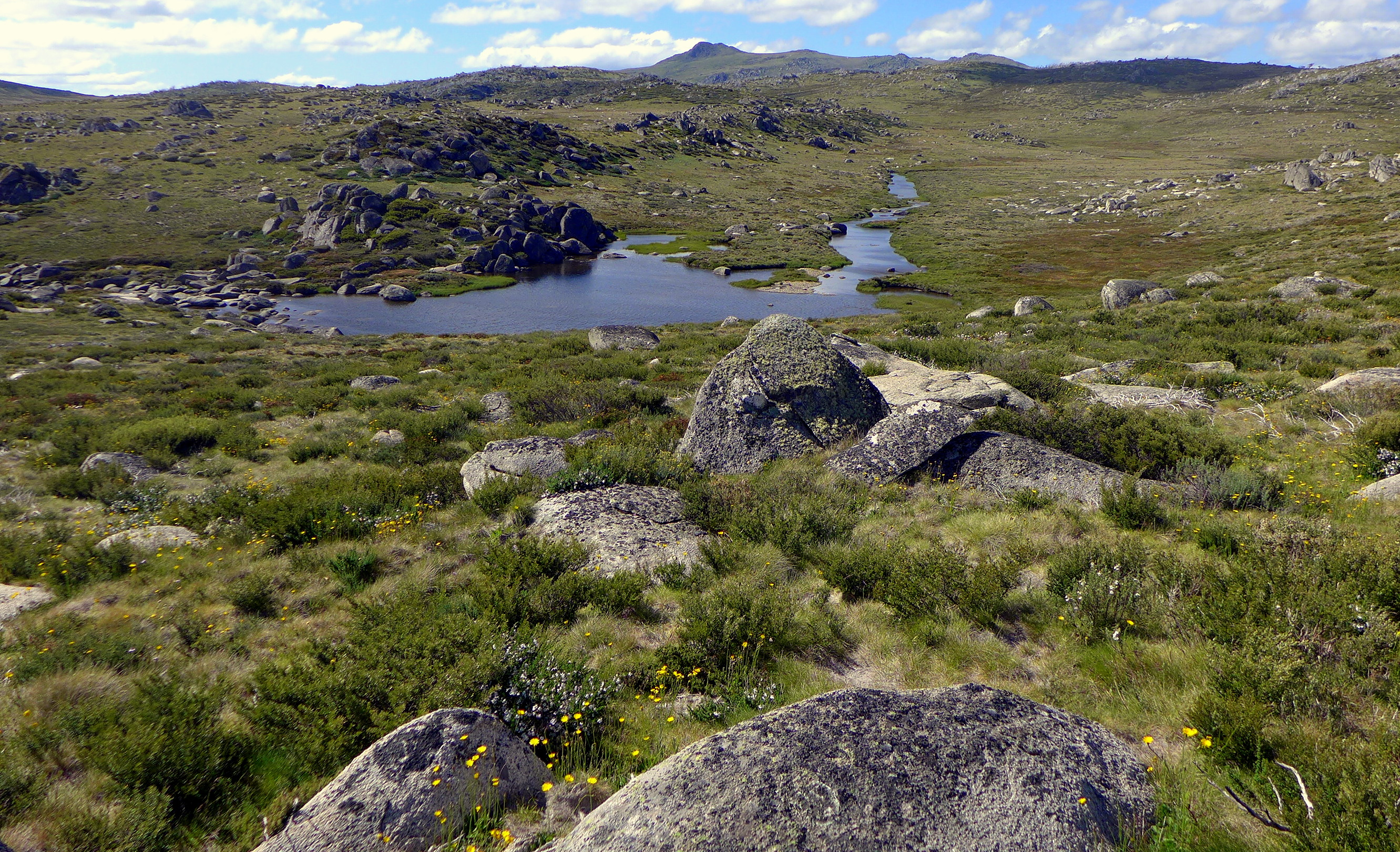
Jagungal Wilderness Area, with Mt Jagungal visible in the distance, beyond the Geehi River

== See also ==
- List of mountains of Australia § New South Wales
- Skiing in Australia
