= Kosciuszko National Park =

National park in Australia

- IUCN category II (national park)
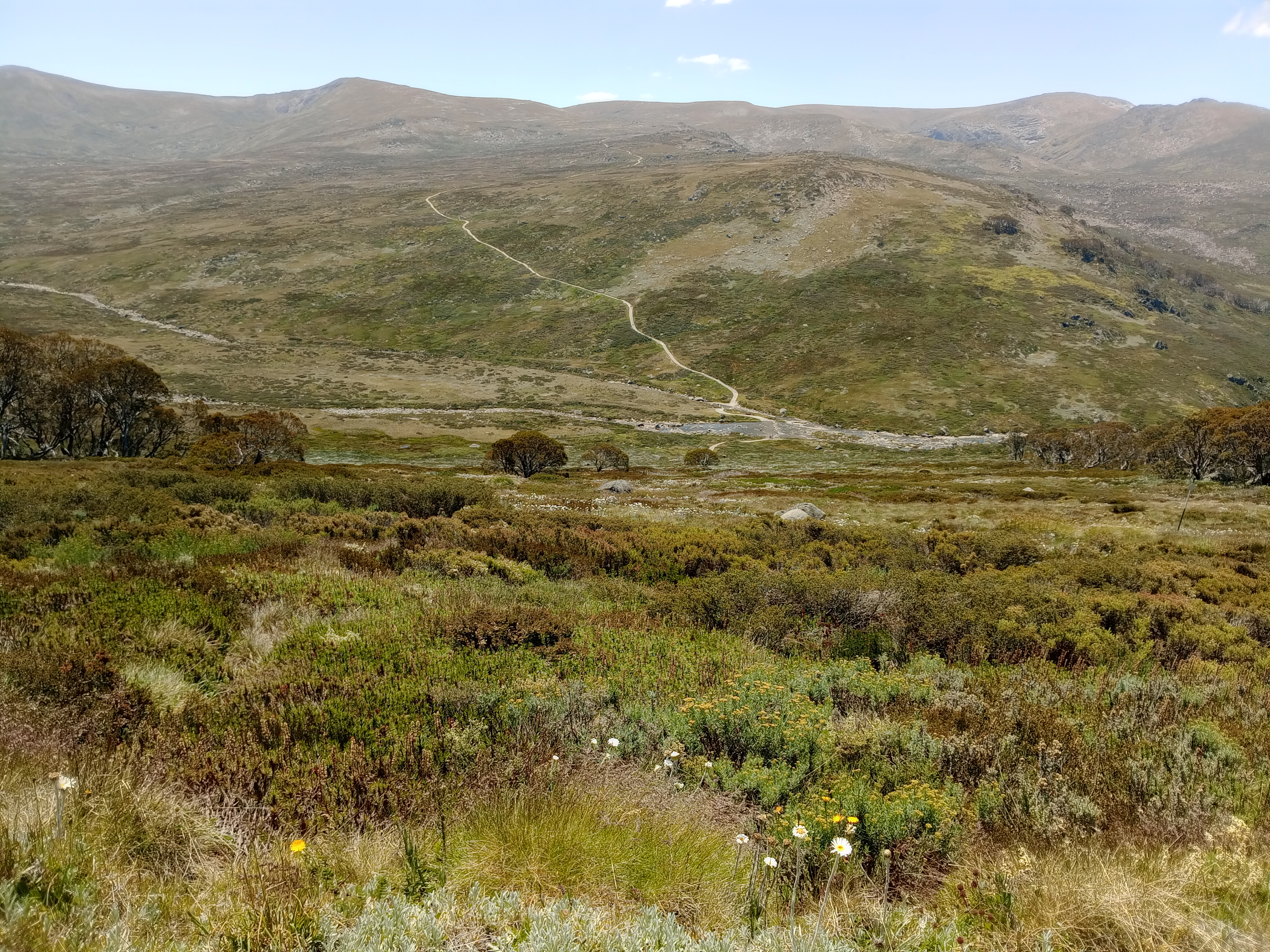
- A view of the Main Range and the Snowy River, near Charlotte's Pass

- Location within New South Wales
- Location: New South Wales
- Nearest city: Cabramurra
- Coordinates: 36°04′20″S 148°20′55″E
- Area: 6,900 km^{2} (2,700 sq mi)
- Established: 1 October 1944
- Visitors: 3279608 (in 2018)
- Governing body: NSW National Parks & Wildlife Service
- Website: Official website

The Kosciuszko National Park (/ˌkɒziˈʌskoʊ/ KOZ-ee-USK-oh) is a 6,900-square-kilometre (2,700 sq mi) national park and contains mainland Australia's highest peak, Mount Kosciuszko, for which it is named, and Cabramurra, the highest town in Australia. Its borders contain a mix of rugged mountains and wilderness, characterised by an alpine climate, which makes it popular with recreational skiers and bushwalkers.

The park is located in the southeastern corner of New South Wales, 354 km (220 mi) southwest of Sydney, and is contiguous with the Alpine National Park in Victoria to the south, and the Namadgi National Park in the Australian Capital Territory to the northeast. The larger towns of Cooma, Tumut and Jindabyne lie just outside and service the park.

The waters of the Snowy River, the Murray River, the Murrumbidgee River, and the Gungarlin River all rise in this park.

Other notable peaks in the park include Gungartan, Mount Jagungal, Bimberi Peak and Mount Townsend.

On 7 November 2008, the park was added to the Australian National Heritage List as one of eleven areas constituting the Australian Alps National Parks and Reserves.

== History ==
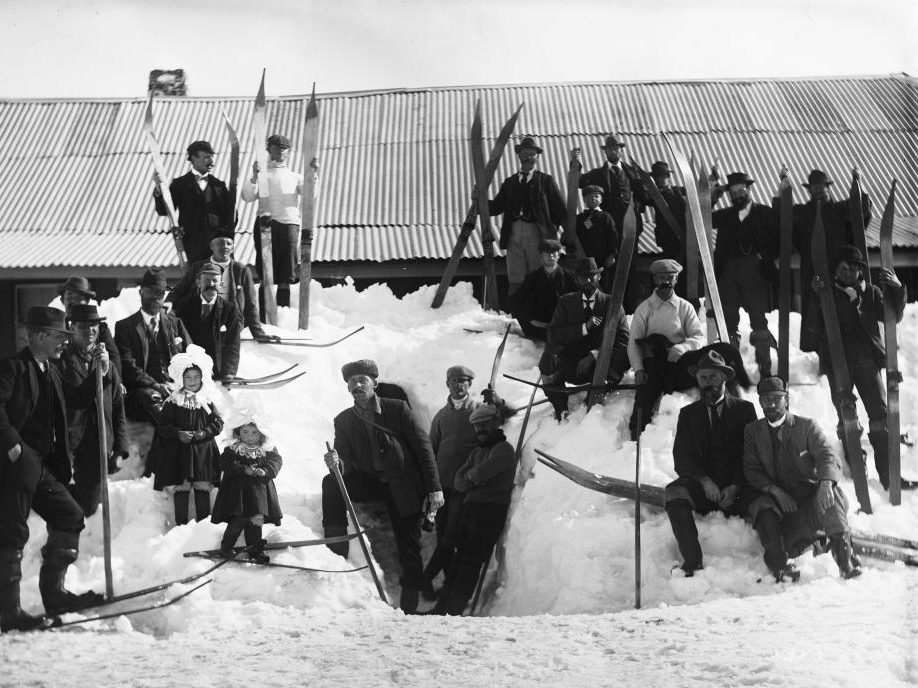
Kiandra Snow Shoe Carnival 1900

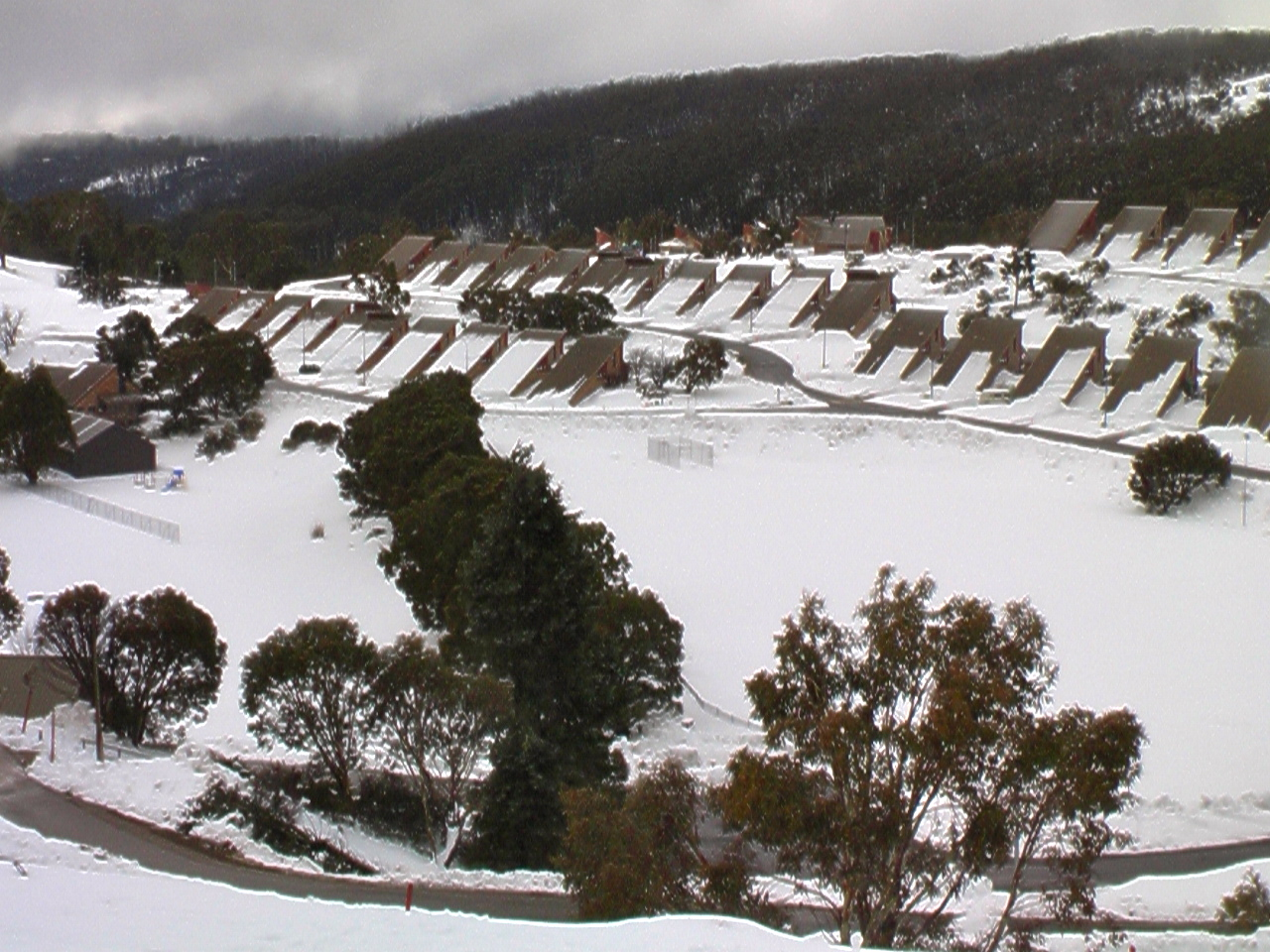
Cabramurra, Australia's highest town, was built during construction of the Snowy Mountains Scheme.

Multiple Aboriginal groups in the southern part of NSW gathered in the Australian Alps Bioregion in the summer on an annual pilgrimage to the Bogong and Snowy Mountains. Here, the men participated in a feast of bogong moths (Agrotis infusa) that were found on the rocky outcrops of the mountains.

The area was explored by Europeans in 1835, and in 1840, Edmund Strzelecki ascended Mount Kosciuszko and renamed it for Polish patriot and military leader Tadeusz Kościuszko. High-country stockmen followed, using the Snowy Mountains for grazing during the summer months. Banjo Paterson's poem The Man From Snowy River recalls this era. The cattle graziers have left a legacy of mountain huts scattered across the area. Today these huts are maintained by the National Parks and Wildlife Service or volunteer organisations like the Kosciuszko Huts Association. In the 19th century, gold was mined on the high plains near Kiandra. At its height, this community had a population of about 4,000 people, and ran 14 hotels. It was here that Skiing in Australia commenced around 1861. Since the last resident left in 1974, Kiandra has become a ghost town of ruins and abandoned diggings. In the 20th century, the focus of Skiing in New South Wales shifted south closer to the Kosciuszko Main Range.

The Kosciuszko National Park came into existence as the National Chase Snowy Mountains on 5 December 1906. In April 1944, following the passage of the Kosciusko State Park Act, the Kosciusko State Park was proclaimed. It then became the Kosciuszko National Park in 1967. The name was misspelt as Kosciusko until 1997.

The construction of the Snowy Mountains Scheme between 1949 and 1974 saw much of the area explored, brought improvements to roads and resulted in the construction of several dams and tunnels across the park in one of the world's largest engineering achievements.

In December 2024, bushwalker Hadi Nazar went missing in the park. He was lost for 14 days, surviving on berries, water from creeks and two muesli bars found in a hut.

== Heritage listings ==
Kosciuszko National Park has a number of heritage-listed sites, including:

- Currango Homestead

== Climate ==
The higher regions of the park experience an alpine climate which is unusual on mainland Australia. However, only the peaks of the main range are subject to consistent heavy winter snow. The climate station at Charlotte Pass recorded Australia's lowest temperature of −23 °C (−9 °F) on 28 June 1994.

== Glaciation ==
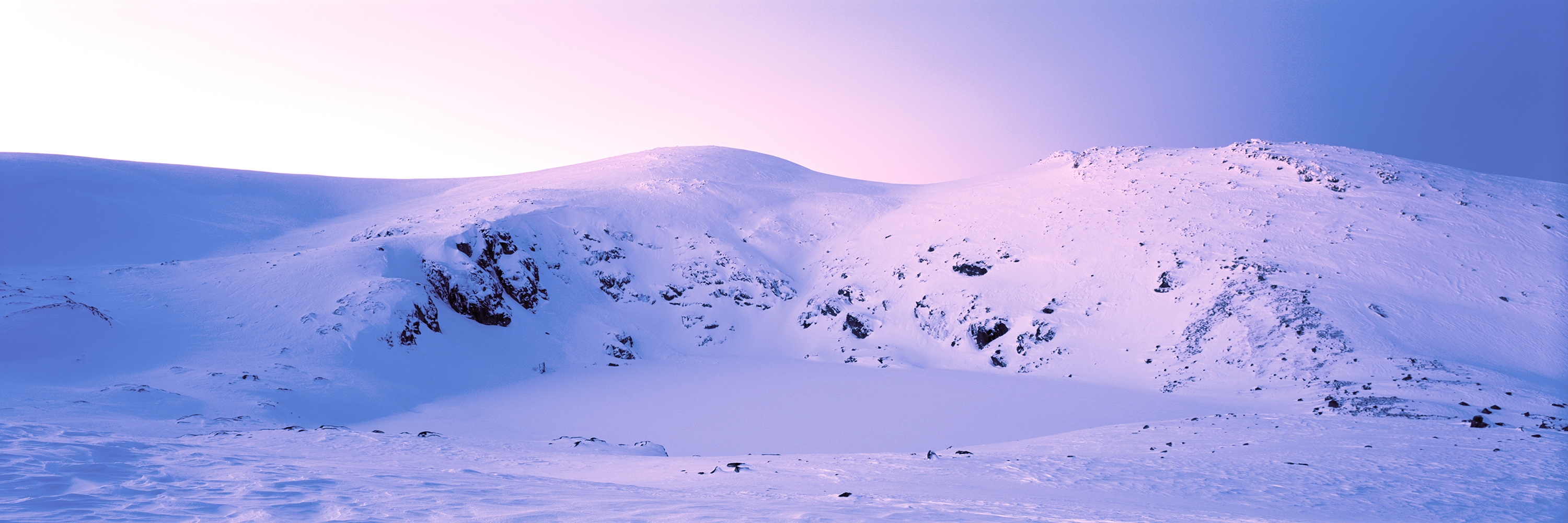
Blue Lake in the characteristically U-shaped glacial valley, Kosciuszko National Park

During the last ice age, which peaked about 20,000 years ago in the Pleistocene epoch, the highest peaks of the main range near Mount Kosciuszko experienced a climate which favoured the formation of glaciers, evidence of which can still be seen today. Cirques moraines, tarn lakes, roche moutonnées and other glacial features can all be seen in the area. Lake Cootapatamba, which was formed by an ice spilling from Mount Kosciuszko's southern flank, is the highest lake on the Australian mainland. Lake Albina, Club Lake, Blue Lake, and Hedley Tarn also have glacial origins.

There is some disagreement as to exactly how widespread Pleistocene glaciation was on the main range, and little or no evidence from earlier glacial periods exists. The "David Moraine", a one-kilometre-long ridge running across Spencers Creek valley seems to indicate a larger glacier existed in this area at some time, however the glacial origin of this feature is disputed.

There is evidence of periglacial activity in the area. Solifluction appears to have created terraces on the northwest flank of Mount Northcote. Frost heave is also a significant agent of soil erosion in the Kosciuszko Area.

The park has been experiencing a decline in snow depth since the 1950s.

== Ecology ==
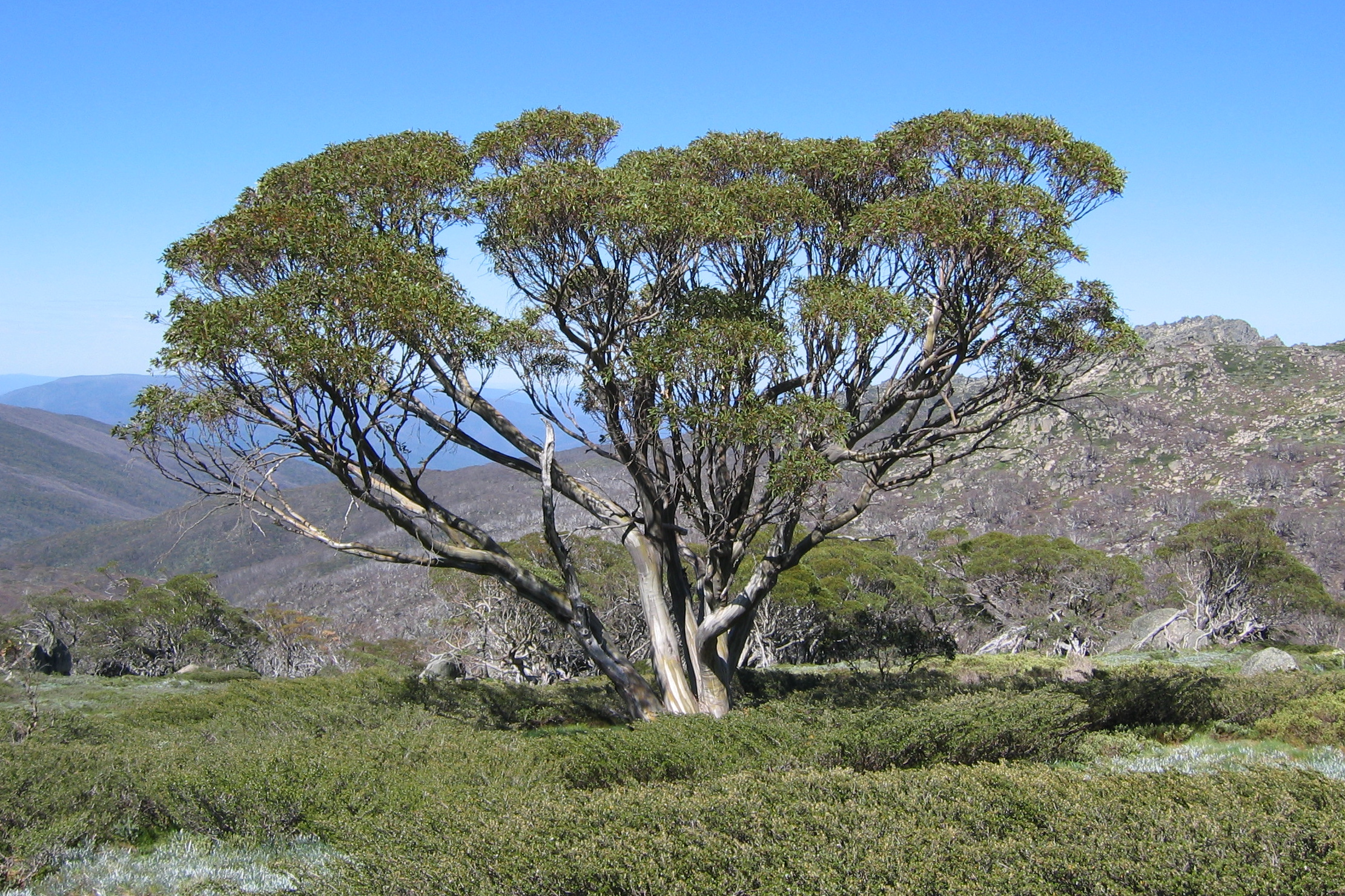
Snow gum at tree line along Dead Horse Gap Walk, Kosciuszko National Park

The Kosciuszko National Park covers a variety of climatic regions which support several distinct ecosystems.

That which is most closely identified with the park, the alpine area above the tree line, is one of the most fragile and covers the smallest area. This area is a patchwork of alpine heaths, herbfields, feldmarks, bogs and fens. The windswept feldmark ecotope is endemic to the alpine region, and covers a mere 300,000 m^{2} (3,200,000 sq ft). It is most vulnerable to the wandering footsteps of unmindful tourists.

Nine separate wilderness zones have been identified in the latest management scheme. These include the Indi, Byadbo, Pilot, Jagungal, Bogong Peaks, Goobarragandra, Western Falls, Bramina and Bimberi wilderness areas.

=== Fauna ===
Many rare or threatened plant and animal species occur within the boundaries of the park.

The park is home to one of Australia's most threatened species: the corroboree frog. The endangered mountain pygmy possum and the more common dusky antechinus are located in the high country of the park. In June 2025 a Leadbeater's possum, previously thought to be extinct in New South Wales, was recorded on a camera near the Yarrangobilly Caves that was part of a survey of the critically endangered smoky mouse. An October 2025 newspaper article reported that a long-footed potoroo was observed for the first time in the park.

There are also significant populations of feral animals in the park, including brumbies or wild horses. Park authorities have coordinated their culling and relocation, leading to public controversy over how to reduce their numbers. The actual number of horses within the park is also difficult to ascertain with estimates ranging from 1,700 in 2008 increasing by 300 each year, 7,679 in 2009, and from 2,500 to 14,000 in 2013–2014. In 2016 the population was estimated to be 6,000. By 2019, this number was found to have more than doubled to 25,000. A 2020 survey placed the number at 14,380. Since the resumption of aerial shooting in Kosciuszko National Park, a total of 5,539 feral horses have been culled. In addition, 427 horses have been removed using other methods such as trapping, rehoming, and ground shooting. According to the latest population surveys conducted in October 2023, it is estimated that there are still approximately 17,000 feral horses in the park.

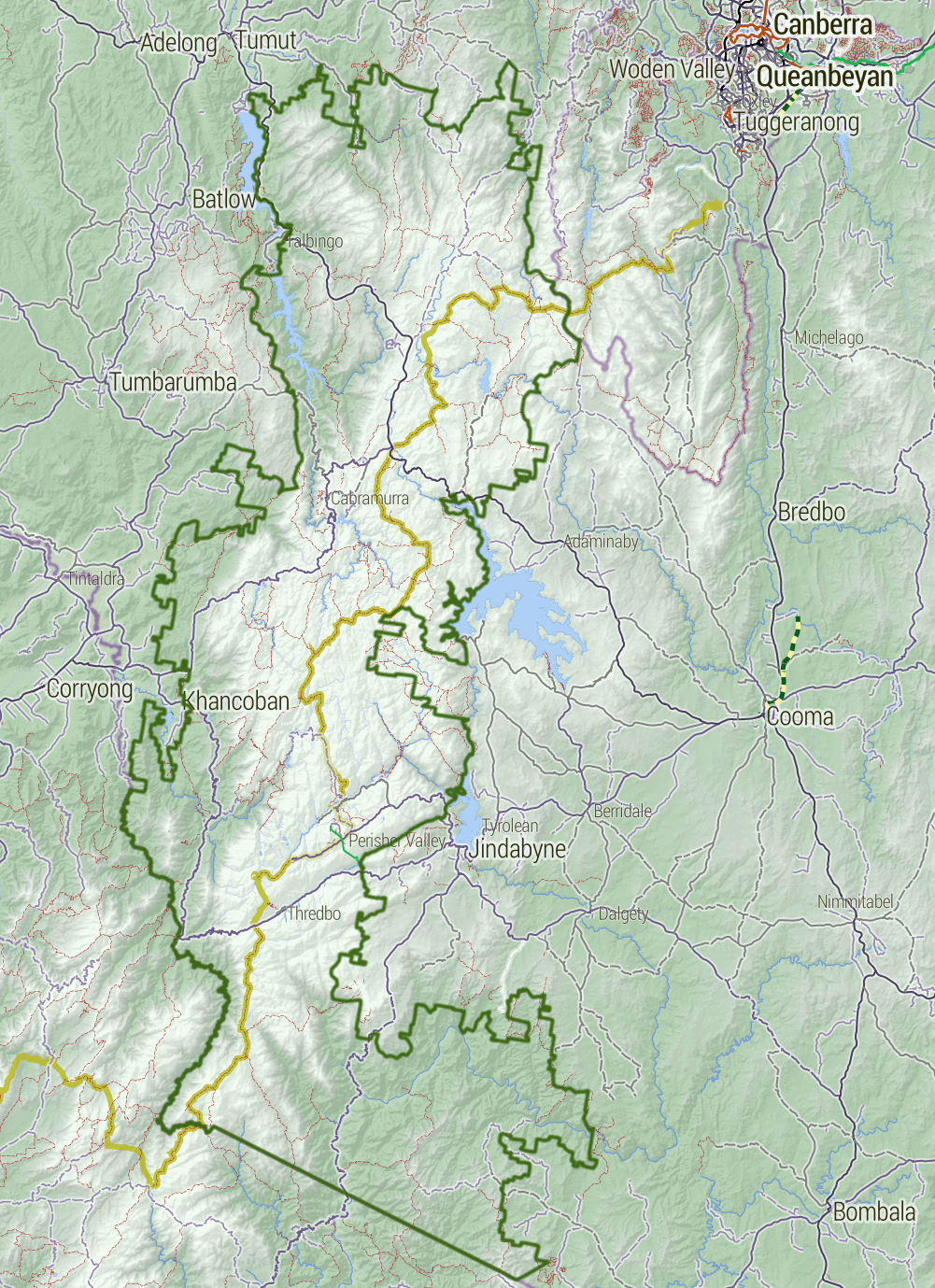
Map of the national park. The Australian Alps Walking Track is shown in yellow.

In June 2021, Federal environment minister Sussan Ley wrote to the NSW environment minister Matt Kean saying she planned to introduce regulation under federal environmental laws to protect the park, because the state was failing in its obligation to do so. A management plan for the wild horses was released on 24 November 2021. By June 2027 numbers are planned to be culled down to 3,000.

=== Flora ===
Much of the park is dominated by alpine woodlands, characterised by the snow gum. Montane and wet sclerophyll forest also occur across the ranges, supporting large stands of alpine ash and mountain gum. In the southern Byadbo wilderness area, dry sclerophyll and wattle forests predominate. Amongst the many different native trees in the park, the large Chinese elm has become naturalised.

Much of the tree cover in the lower sections of the park was seriously burned in bushfires in 2003. Fires are a natural feature of the park ecosystem, but it will take some time for the region to return to its pre 2003 condition.

== Recreational uses ==
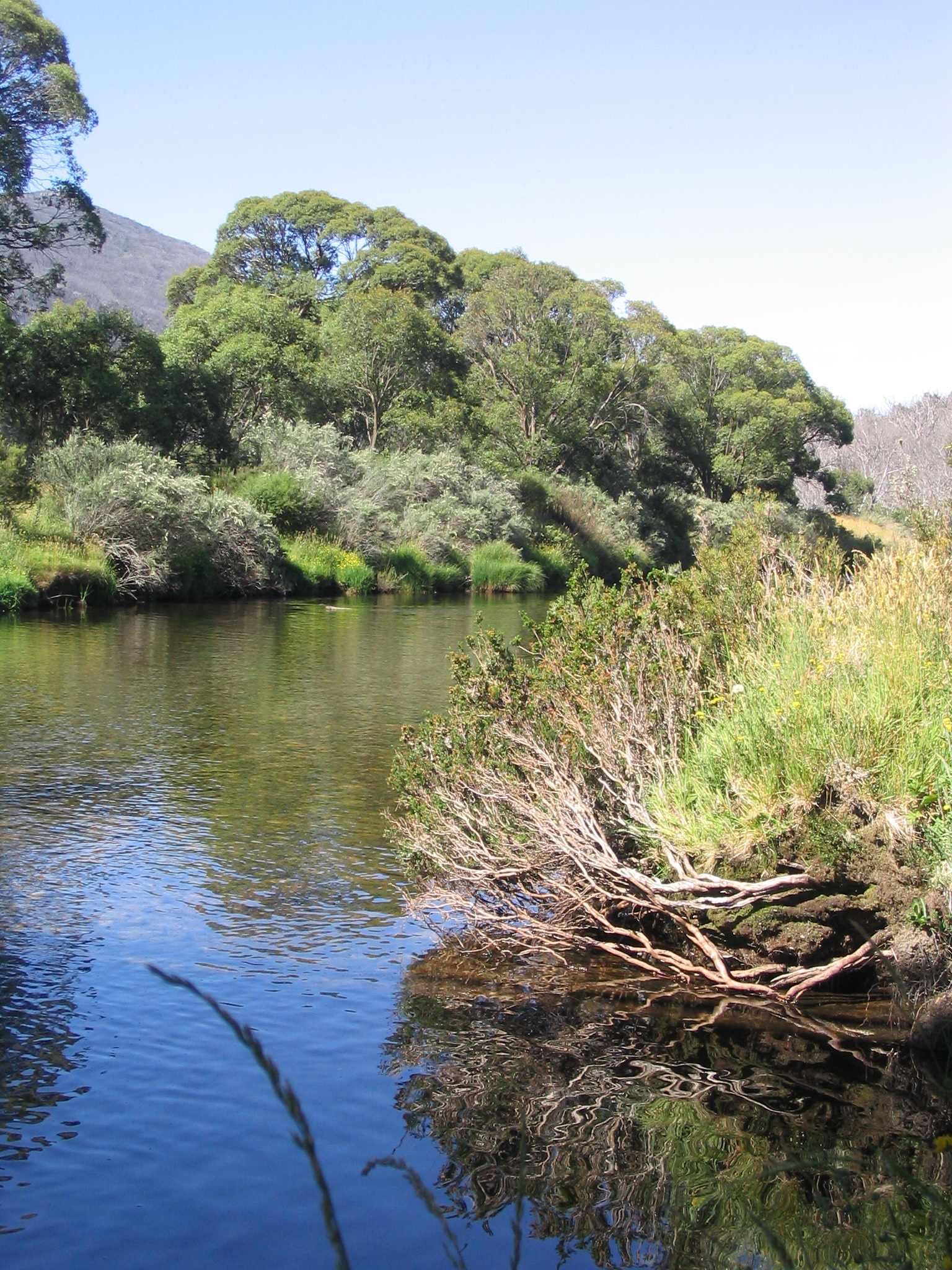
A tranquil section of Thredbo River

=== Winter ===
The mountains are typically covered by metre-deep snow for up to four months of the year. The ski resorts of Thredbo, Selwyn snowfields, Perisher and Charlotte Pass lie within the park. The electric rack railway, called Skitube, connects the Alpine Way to the Perisher Valley.

=== Summer ===
The 655 kilometre Australian Alps Walking Track crosses almost the length of the park. Many thousands of people make the walk to Mount Kosciuszko during the summer. It is 9 kilometres from Charlotte Pass, or 6 kilometres from the Thredbo chairlift. Camping is permitted anywhere in the park except within sight of a road or near a watercourse. The lighting of fires is severely restricted in higher altitudes.

Mountain biking is allowed on all management trails outside of wilderness areas, and on a small number within them: Grey Mare Trail, Round Mountain Trail, Valentine Trail, Hellhole Creek Trail, Cascade Trail, Ingegoodbee Trail and Nine Mile Trail.

Canoeing and swimming in the rivers and lakes are popular in the warmer weather. The rivers and dams are stocked with trout from nearby hatcheries. Seasonal trout fishing is allowed after a permit is obtained. Other attractions include the whitewater rafting, trail riding, Yarrangobilly Caves, Cooleman Caves, Tin Mine Falls, Australia's highest waterfall and Valentine Falls. Guided tours are conducted through several caves in the karst region of Yarrangobilly. Other tours are also available.

Sawpit Creek has a major campground with facilities for caravans and cabins available for rent.

== The Snowy Mountains Hydroelectric Scheme ==
The Snowy River originates in the park and flows south to Victoria. Many tunnels, dams, generators and other parts of the Snowy Mountains Scheme hydro-electric system are located within the park, including the Tantangara Reservoir and Snowy 2.0 Pumped Storage Power Station.

The Snowy Scheme, constructed between 1949 and 1974, is a hydroelectricity and irrigation complex consisting of sixteen major dams; seven power stations; a pumping station; and 225 kilometres of tunnels, pipelines and aqueducts. The chief engineer was Sir William Hudson. It is the largest engineering project undertaken in Australia. An 8 km powerline is planned through the area.

== See also ==
- Last Glacial Maximum
- National Parks in New South Wales
- Protected areas of New South Wales
- List of biosphere reserves in Australia
