= Gungartan =

Mountain in Australia

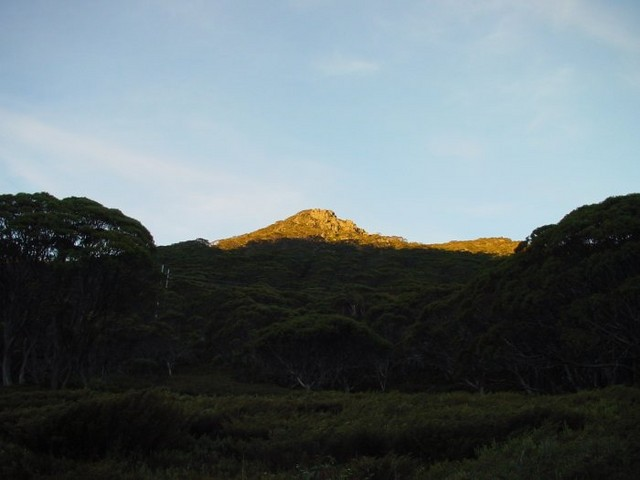
- Gungartan as seen from near Whites River Hut to the southwest of the mountain

Highest point
- Elevation: 2,068 m (6,785 ft)
- Prominence: 248 m (814 ft)
- Isolation: 14.32 km (8.90 mi)
- Coordinates: 36°16′S 148°23′E

Geography
- Location within New South Wales
- Location: Snowy Mountains, New South Wales, Australia
- Parent range: Great Dividing Range
- Topo map: Geehi Dam

Climbing
- Easiest route: Walk (hike)

Gungartan is a mountain located in the Snowy Mountains region of New South Wales, Australia.

With an elevation of 2,068 metres (6,785 ft) above sea level, Gungartan is the highest mountain on mainland Australia not within the Main Range. It is located close to Whites River Hut in Kosciuszko National Park.

Many walkers climb to the peak in summer as it offers excellent views of the surrounding national park. The overall climb to the peak is fairly easy and involves only minor scrambling close to the peak. In winter the mountain is generally snow covered and offers excellent backcountry skiing across the saddle in good conditions. In mid-winter the saddle and peak are best avoided during poor weather due to surface ice and high winds created by the funnelling effect of the valley below.

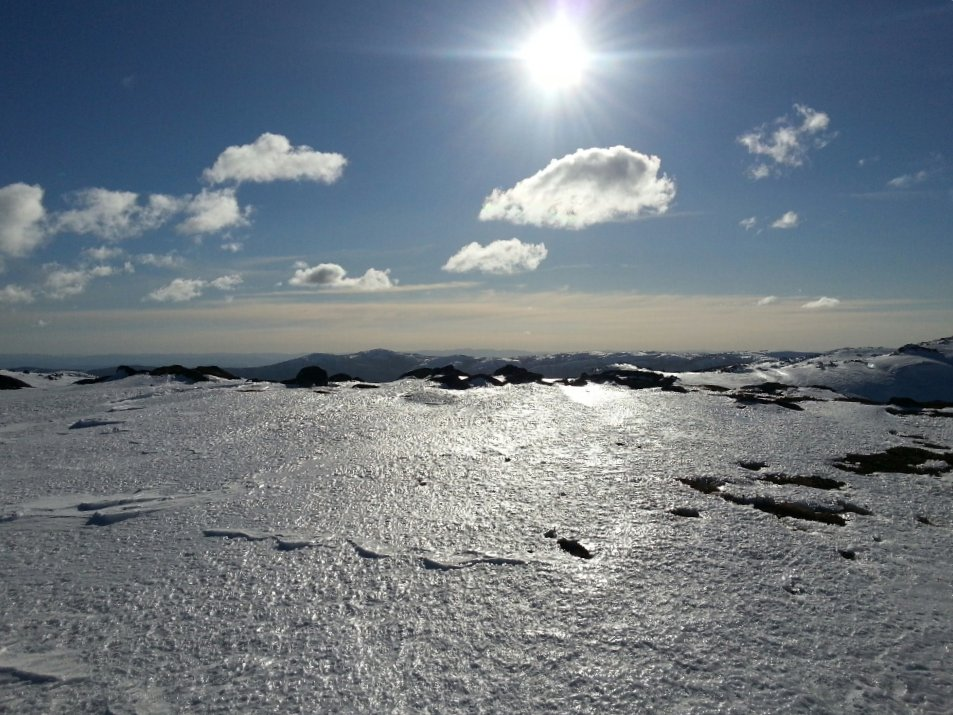

== Topography ==
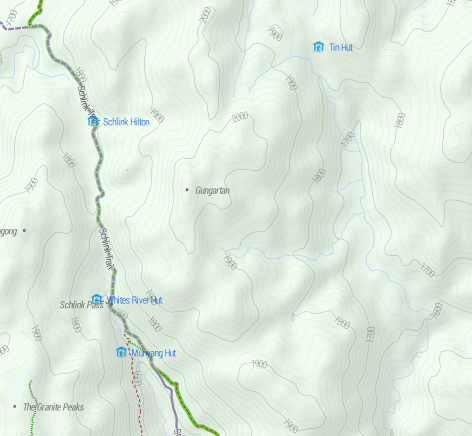
Topographic map of Gungartan

== See also ==
- List of mountains of New South Wales
