= Snowy Mountains =

Mountain range in Australia

- The Snowies
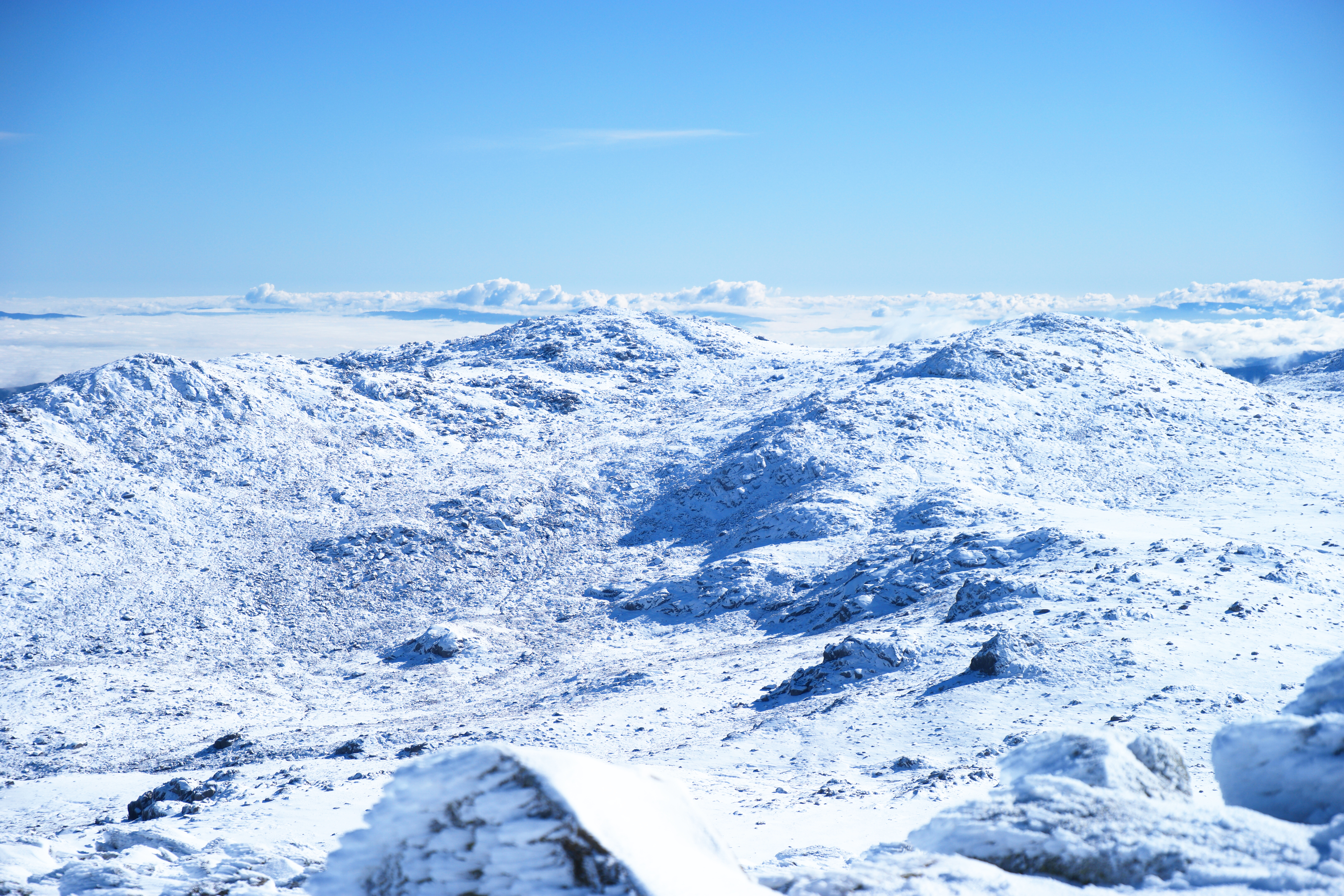
- Mountain ranges surrounding Mount Kosciuszko

Highest point
- Peak: Mount Kosciuszko
- Elevation: 2,228 m (7,310 ft)
- Coordinates: 36°27′S 148°16′E

Geography
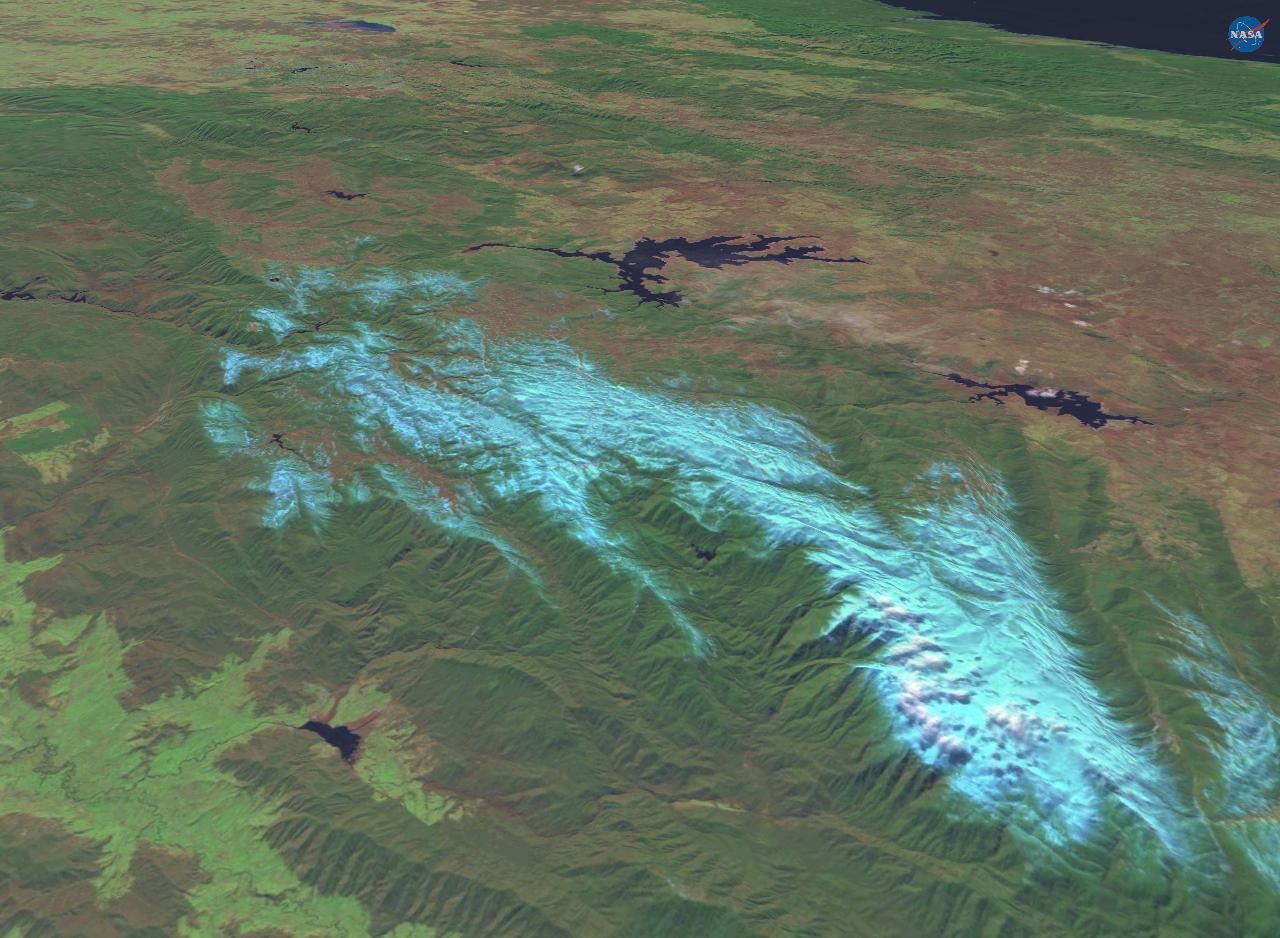
- Worldwind image of Snowy Mountains
- Country: Australia
- State: NSW
- Range coordinates: 36°30′S 148°20′E
- Parent range: Australian Alps

The Snowy Mountains, known informally as "The Snowies", is an IBRA subregion in southern New South Wales, Australia, and is the tallest mountain range in mainland Australia, being part of the continent's Great Dividing Range, a cordillera system. It makes up the northeastern half of the Australian Alps (the other half being the Victorian Alps) and contains Australia's five tallest peaks, all of which are above 2,100 m (6,890 ft), including the tallest Mount Kosciuszko, which reaches to a height of 2,228 m (7,310 ft) above sea level. The offshore Tasmanian highlands makes up the only other major alpine region present in the whole of Australia.

The Snowy Mountains experience large natural snowfalls for several months of the year; with significant accumulation during May, June, July, August, September and October with the snow cover usually melting by November (although it can occasionally persist through high summer and the next autumn). It is considered to be one of the centres of the Australian ski industry during the winter months, with all four snow resorts in New South Wales being located in the region. The range is host to the mountain plum-pine, a low-lying type of conifer.

The Alpine Way and Snowy Mountains Highway are the major roads through the Snowy Mountains region.

== History ==
The mountain range is thought to have had Aboriginal occupation for 20,000 years. Large gatherings were held in the High Country during summer for collective feasting on the bogong moth.

The area was first explored by Europeans in 1835, and in 1840, Edmund Strzelecki ascended Mount Kosciuszko and named it after the Polish patriot. High country stockmen followed who used the Snowy Mountains for grazing during the summer months. Banjo Paterson's famous poem The Man From Snowy River recalls this era. The cattle graziers have left a legacy of mountain huts scattered across the area. Today these huts are maintained by the National Parks and Wildlife Service or volunteer organisations like the Kosciuszko Huts Association.

In the 19th century gold was mined on the high plains near Kiandra. At its height this community had a population of about 4,000 people, and ran 14 hotels. Since the last resident left in 1974, Kiandra has become a ghost town of ruins and abandoned diggings.

The Kosciuszko National Park came into existence as the National Chase Snowy Mountains on 5 December 1906. In 1944 this became the Kosciuszko State Park and the Kosciuszko National Park in 1967.

Recreational skiing began at Kiandra in the 1860s and experienced a boom in the 20th century following the commencement of the construction of the Snowy Mountains Hydro-Electric Scheme between 1949 and 1976 which brought many European workers to the district and opened up access to the ranges.

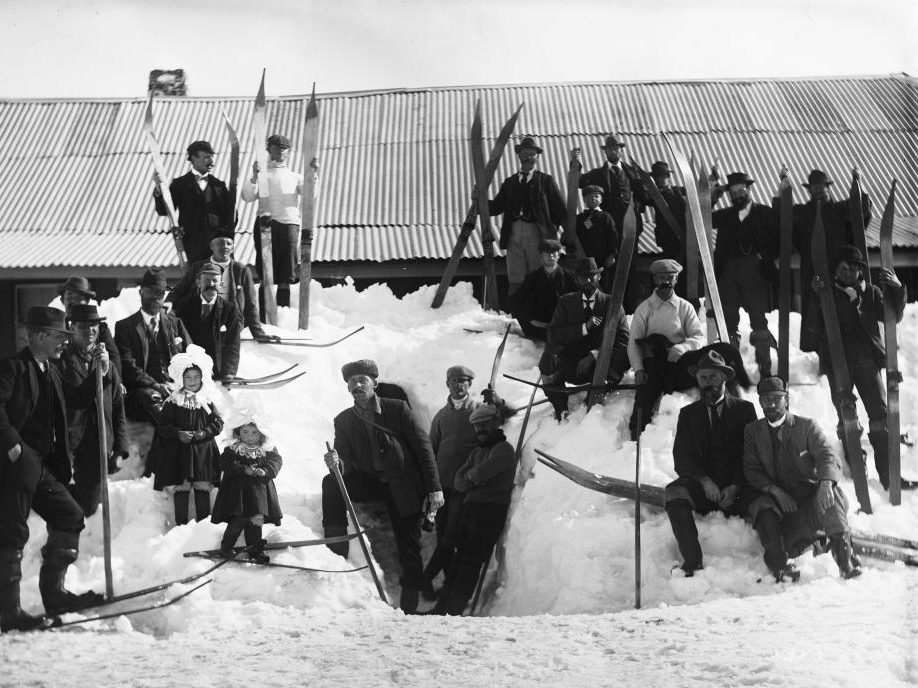
Skiing in Australia began in the goldrush town of Kiandra around 1861.

=== Skiing ===
The discovery of gold at Kiandra (elevation 1,400 m or 4,600 ft), in 1859, briefly enticed a population of thousands above the snowline and saw the introduction of recreational skiing to the Snowy Mountains around 1861. The Kiandra Goldrush was short-lived, but the township remained a service centre for recreational and survival skiing for over a century. Australia's first T-bar lift was installed at Kiandra in 1957, but the ski facilities were finally shifted up the hill to Selwyn Snowfields in 1978. Steeper slopes and more reliable snows lie further to the south and in the 20th century, the focus of recreational skiing in New South Wales shifted southward, to the Mount Kosciuszko region.

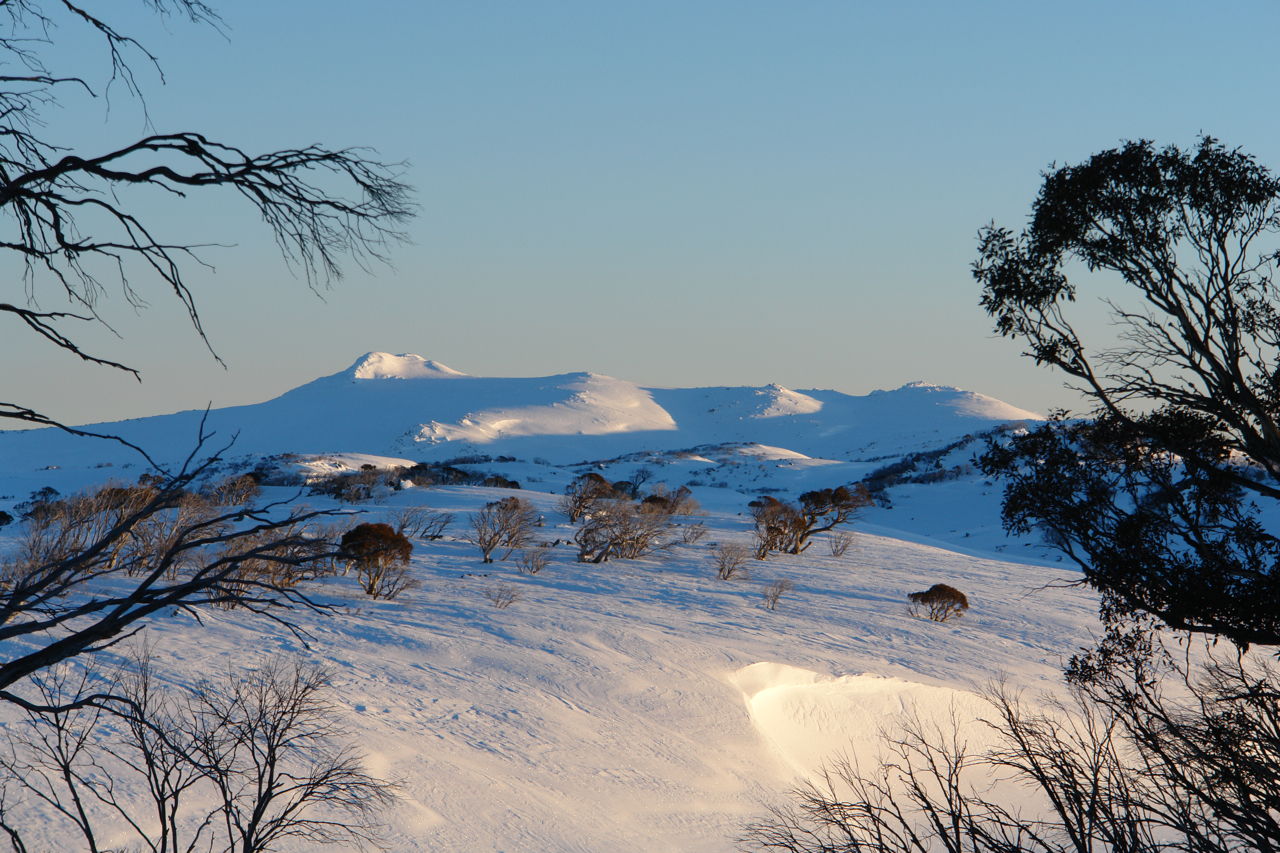
Sunrise over Mount Jagungal

The Kosciuszko Chalet was built at Charlotte Pass in 1930, giving relatively comfortable access to Australia's highest terrain. In 1964, Australia briefly boasted the "World's Longest Chairlift", designed to carry skiers from the Thredbo Valley to Charlotte Pass, but technical difficulties soon closed the facility. At 1,760 m (5,774 ft), Charlotte Pass has the highest village base elevation of any Australia ski resort and can only be accessed via over-snow transport in winter. The growing number of ski enthusiasts heading to Charlotte Pass led to the establishment of a cafe at Smiggin Holes around 1939, where horse-drawn sleighs would deliver skiers to begin the arduous ski to the Kosciuszko Chalet. It was the construction of the vast Snowy Mountains Hydro-Electric Scheme from 1949 that really opened up the Snowy Mountains for large scale development of a ski industry and led to the establishment of Thredbo and Perisher as leading Australian resorts. The Construction of Guthega Dam brought skiers to the isolated Guthega district and a rope tow was installed there in 1957.

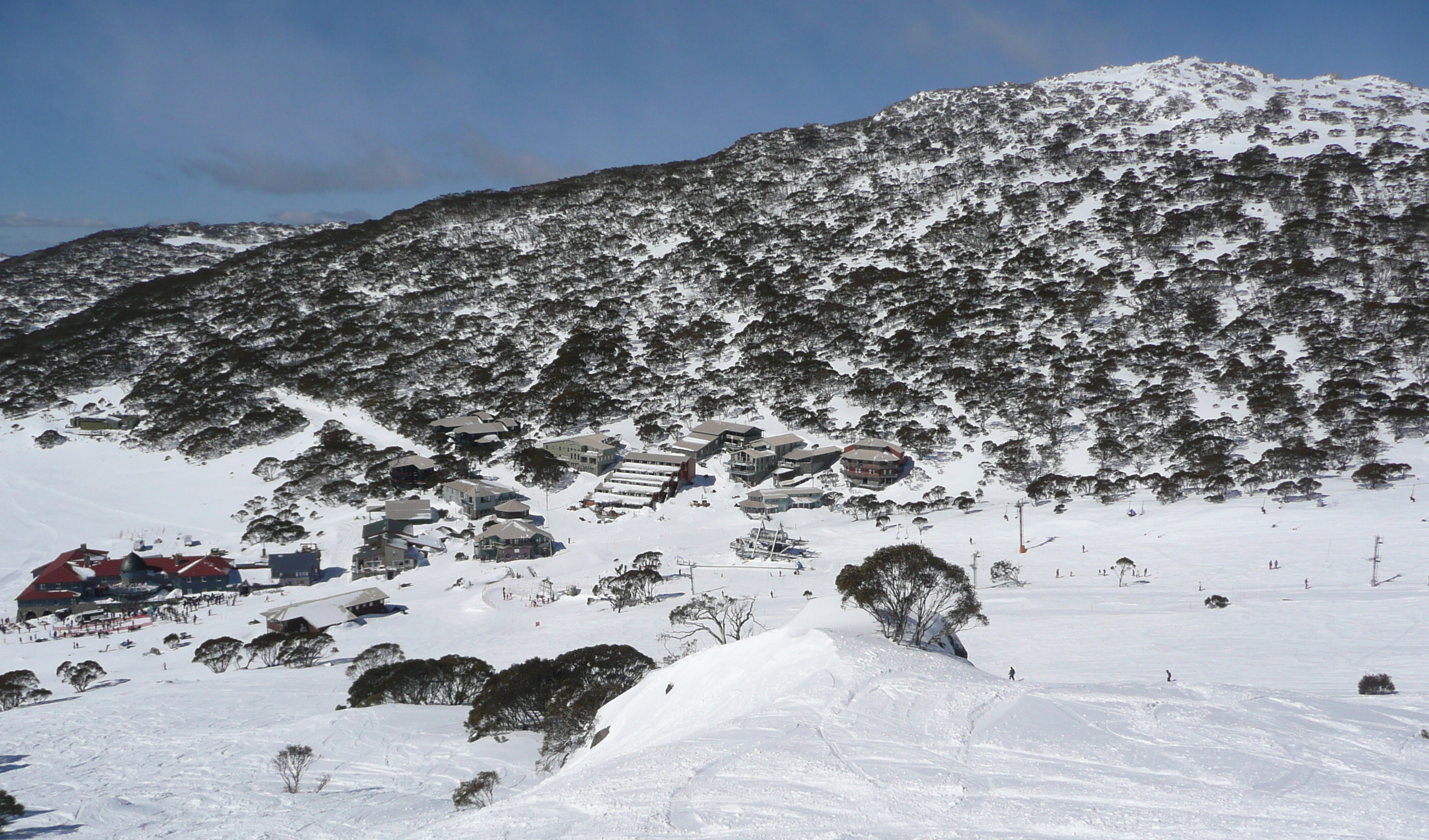
Charlotte Pass, a popular ski area in the upper Snowy Mountains

Skifields up by Kosciuszko's side were also established during this period, though their existence is now little realised. The Australian Alpine Club was founded in 1950 by Charles Anton. Huts were constructed in the "Backcountry" close to Mount Kosciuszko, including Kunama Hut, which opened for the 1953 season. A rope tow was installed on Mount Northcote at the site and opened in 1954. The site proved excellent for speed skiing, but the hut was destroyed in an avalanche, which also killed one person, in 1956.

Anton also recognised the potential of the Thredbo Valley for construction of a major resort and village, with good vertical terrain. Construction began in 1957. Today, Thredbo has 14 ski-lifts and possesses Australia's longest ski resort run, the 5.9 km from Karel's T-Bar to Friday Flat; Australia's greatest vertical drop of 672 m; and the highest lifted point in Australia at 2037 m.

The last establishment of a major skifield in NSW came with the development of Blue Cow Mountain in the 1980s. In 1987 the Swiss designed Skitube railway opened to deliver skiers from Bullocks Flat, on the Alpine Way, to Perisher Valley and to Blue Cow, which also opened in 1987. The operators of Blue Cow purchased Guthega in 1991, and the new combined resort later merged with Perisher-Smiggins to become the largest ski resort in the Southern Hemisphere. In 2022, Perisher had 48 lifts covering 1,245 hectares and four village base areas: Perisher Valley, Blue Cow, Smiggin Holes and Guthega.

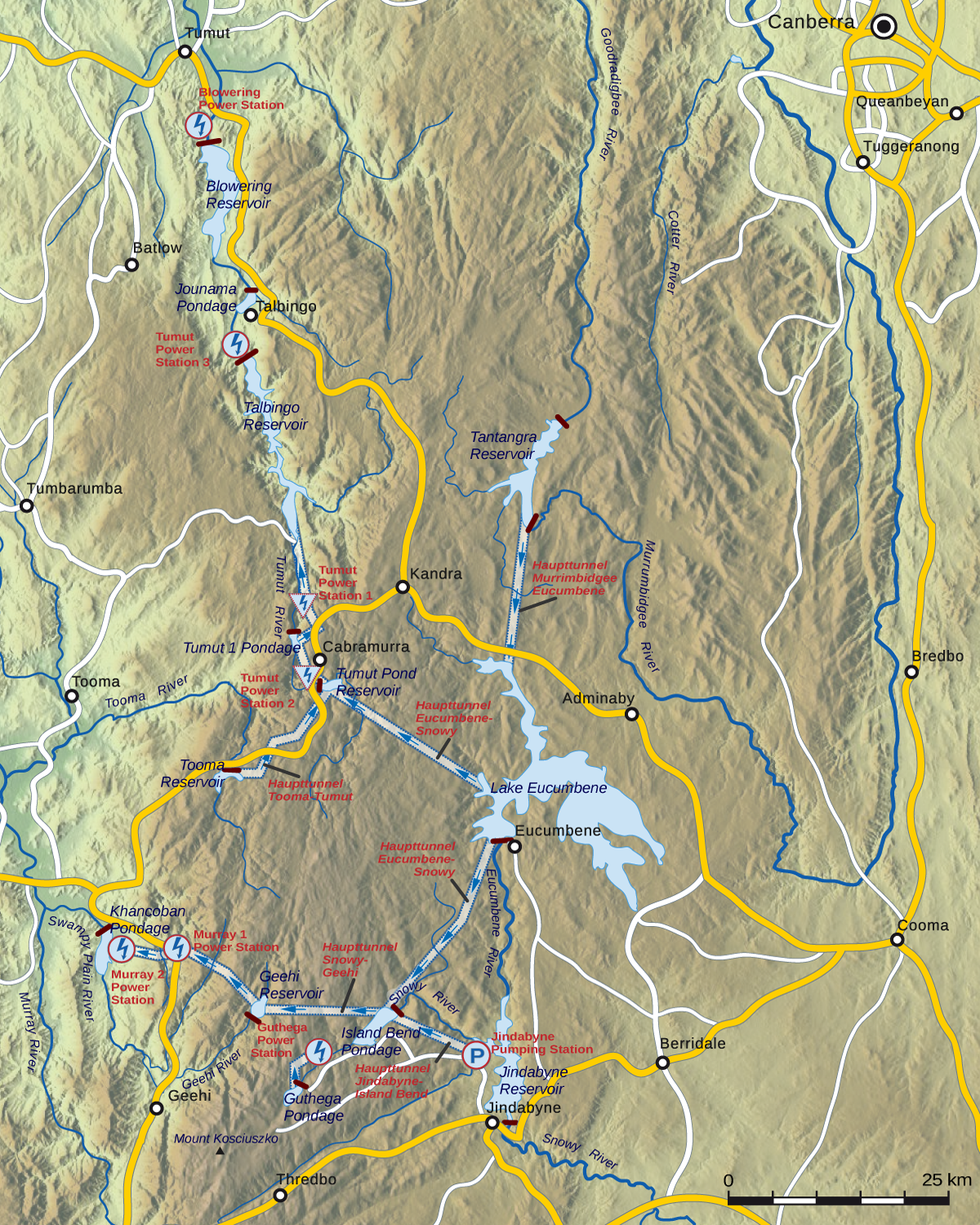
Map of Snowy Mountains Scheme

=== Snowy Mountains Scheme ===
The Snowy Mountains also feed the Murrumbidgee and Murray rivers from the Tooma River, Whites River and Yarrangobilly River. The range is perhaps best known for the Snowy Mountains Scheme, a project to dam the Snowy River, providing both water for irrigation and hydroelectricity.

The project began in 1949 employing 100,000 men, two-thirds of whom came from thirty other countries during the post-World War II years. Socially this project symbolises a period during which Australia became an ethnic "melting pot" of the twentieth century but which also changed Australia's character and increased its appreciation for a wide range of cultural diversity.

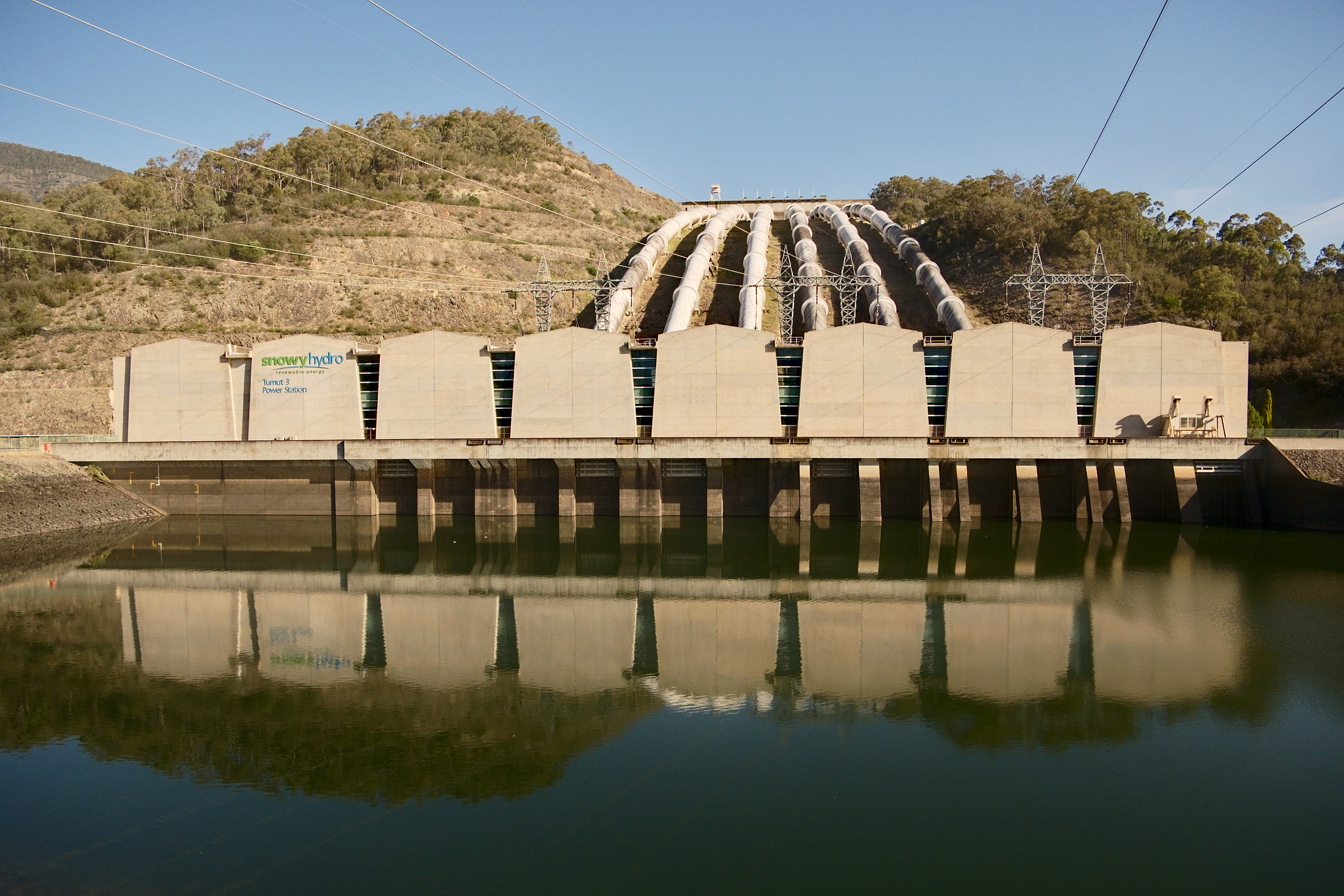
Tumut 3 generating station

The Scheme built several temporary towns for its construction workers, several of which have become permanent: Cabramurra (the highest town in Australia); and Khancoban. Additionally, the economy of Cooma has been sustained by the Scheme. Townships at Adaminaby, Jindabyne and Talbingo were inundated by the construction of Lakes Eucumbene, Jindabyne and Talbingo. Improved vehicular access to the High Country enabled ski-resort villages to be constructed at Thredbo and Guthega in the 1950s by ex-Snowy Scheme workers, who realised the potential for expansion of the Australian ski industry.

By 1974, 145 km (90 mi) of tunnels and 80 km (50 mi) of aqueducts connected the sixteen dams, seven power stations (two underground), and one pumping station. The American Society of Civil Engineers has rated the Snowy Scheme as "a world-class civil engineering project".

The principal lakes created by the scheme include: Lake Eucumbene, Blowering Dam, Talbingo Dam, Lake Jindabyne and Tantangara Dam.

== Geography ==
=== Climate ===
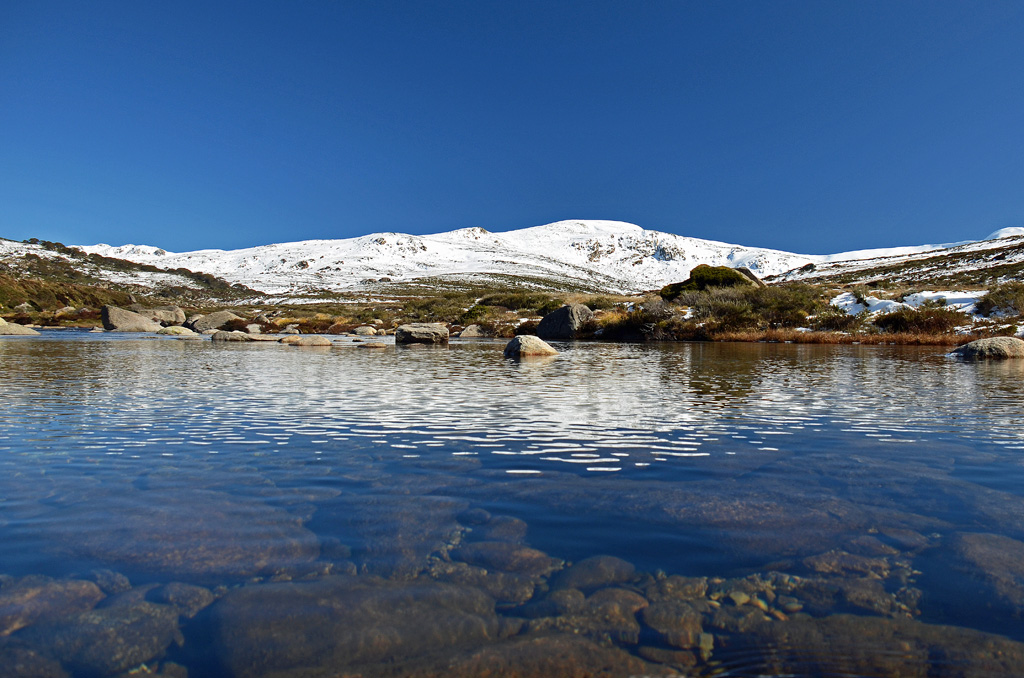
Mount Kosciuszko from the Snowy River

The higher regions of the park experience an alpine climate which is unusual on mainland Australia. Generally, only areas above 1,400 metres (4,600 ft) are subject to a consistent heavy winter snowpack. Snow normally falls to around 600 metres (2,000 ft) most winters, and can occur as low as 300 metres (980 ft) on the windward west side of the Snowies (on the South West Slopes); and on a few occasions has even fallen in Albury only 165 metres (541 ft) above sea level. The weather station at Charlotte Pass recorded Australia's lowest temperature of −23.0 °C (−9.4 °F) on 28 June 1994.

=== Glacial lakes ===
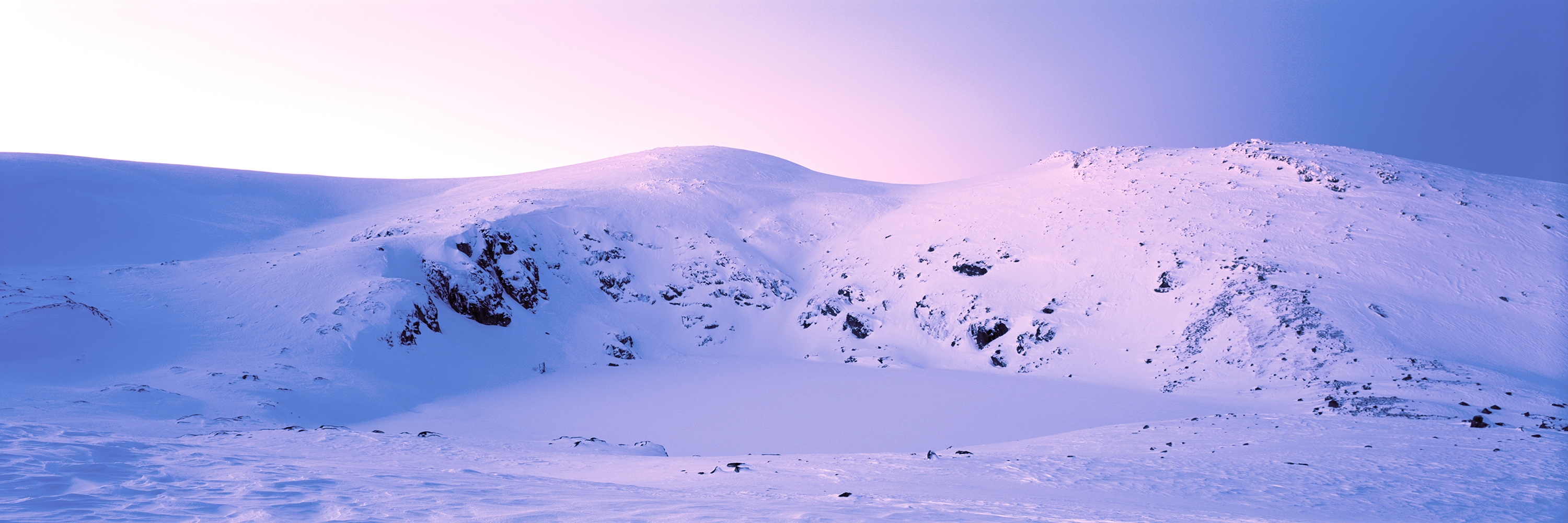
Blue Lake in the characteristically U-shaped glacial valley, Kosciuszko National Park

Part of the mountains known as Main Range contains mainland Australia's five glacial lakes. The largest of these lakes is Blue Lake, one of the headwaters of the Snowy River. The other four glacial lakes are Lake Albina, Lake Cootapatamba, Club Lake and Headley Tarn.

During the last ice age, which peaked about 20,000 years ago in the Pleistocene epoch, the highest peaks of the main range near Mount Kosciuszko experienced a climate which favoured the formation of glaciers, evidence of which can still be seen today. Cirques moraines, tarn lakes, roche moutonnées and other glacial features can all be seen in the area. Lake Cootapatamba, which was formed by an ice spilling from Mount Kosciuszko's southern flank, is the highest lake on the Australian mainland. Lake Albina, Club Lake, Blue Lake, and Hedley Tarn also have glacial origins.

There is some disagreement as to exactly how widespread Pleistocene glaciation was on the main range, and little or no evidence from earlier glacial periods exists. The 'David Moraine', a one kilometre long ridge running across Spencers Creek valley seems to indicate a larger glacier existed in this area at some time, however the glacial origin of this feature is disputed.

There is evidence of periglacial activity in the area. Solifluction appears to have created terraces on the north west flank of Mount Northcote. Frost heave is also a significant agent of soil erosion in the Kosciuszko Area.

== Ecology ==
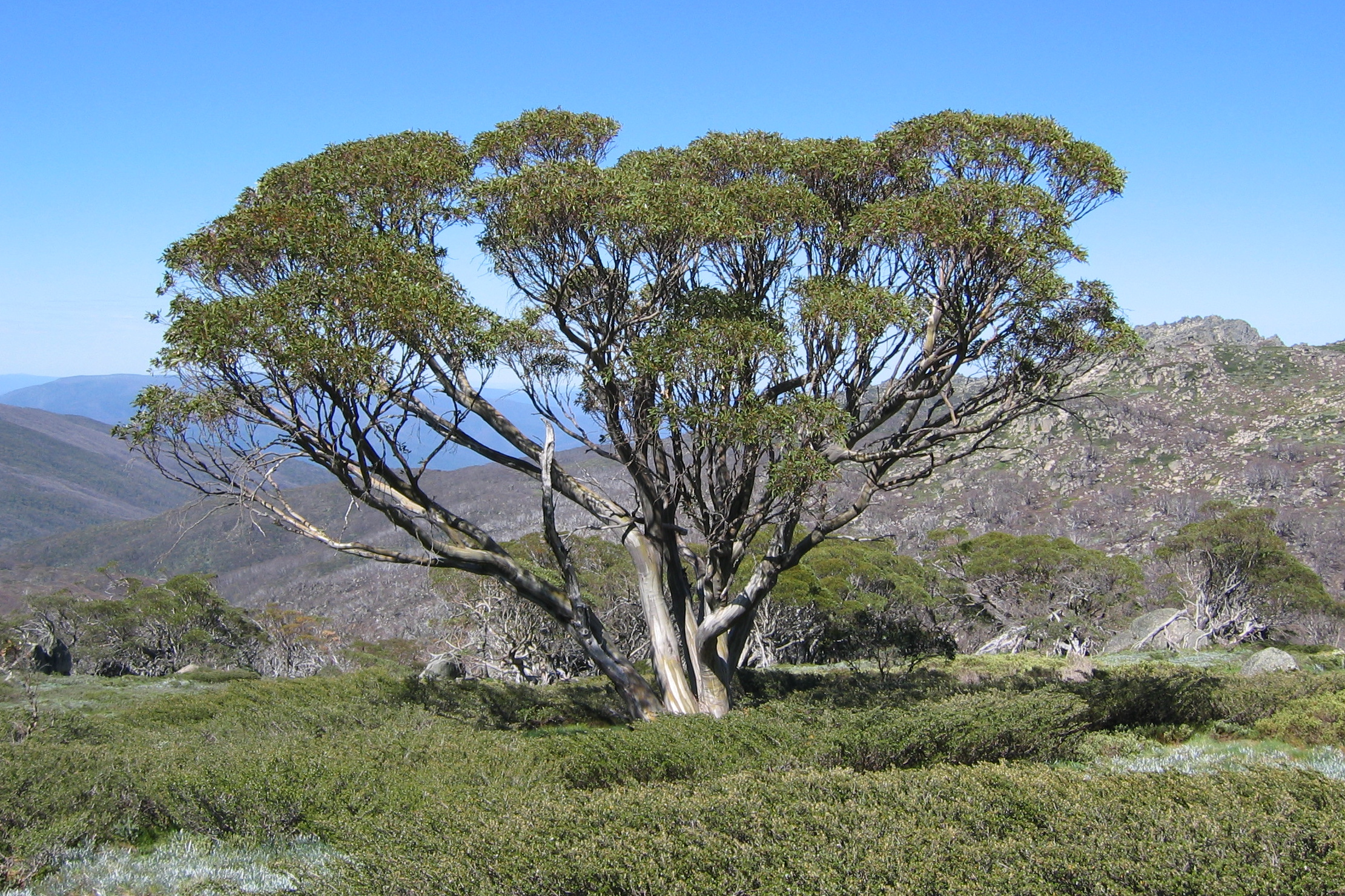
Snow gum at tree line along Dead Horse Gap Walk, Kosciuszko National Park

The Snowy Mountains cover a variety of climatic regions which support several distinct ecosystems. The alpine area above the tree line is one of the most fragile and covers the smallest area. This area is a patchwork of alpine heaths, herbfields, feldmarks, bogs and fens. The windswept feldmark ecotope is endemic to the alpine region, and covers a mere 300,000 square metres (3,200,000 sq ft).

=== Fauna ===
Many rare or threatened plant and animal species live within the Snowy Mountains. The Kosciuszko National Park is home to one of Australia's most threatened species (the corroboree frog); the endangered mountain pygmy possum and the more common dusky antechinus are located in the high country of the park.

By 2008, wild horse numbers in the National Park had reached 1,700 with that figure growing by up to 300 each year, resulting in park authorities coordinating their culling and relocation.

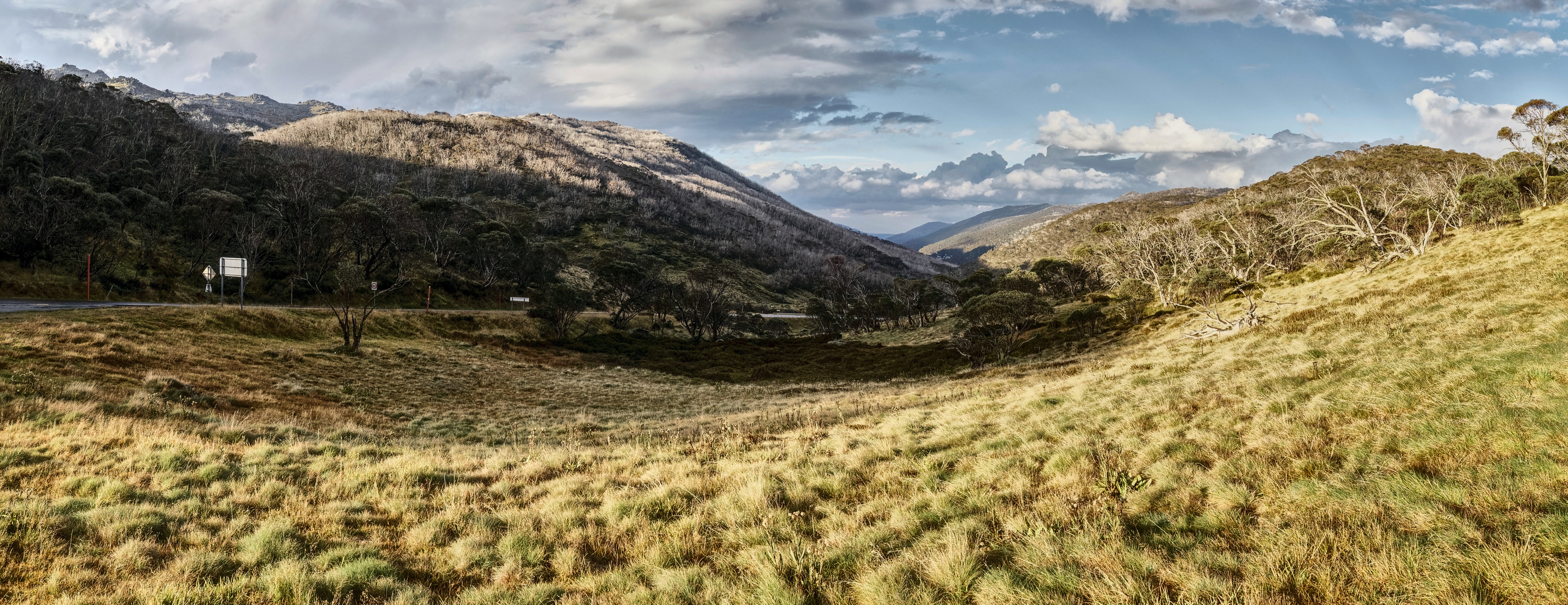
Dead Horse Gap, overlooking the Thredbo Valley

=== Flora ===
The high country is dominated by alpine woodlands, characterised by the snow gum. Montane and wet sclerophyll forests also occur across the ranges, supporting large stands of alpine ash and mountain gum. In the southern Byadbo wilderness area, dry sclerophyll and wattle forests predominate. Amongst the many different native trees in the park, the large Chinese elm has become naturalised.

=== Bushfires ===
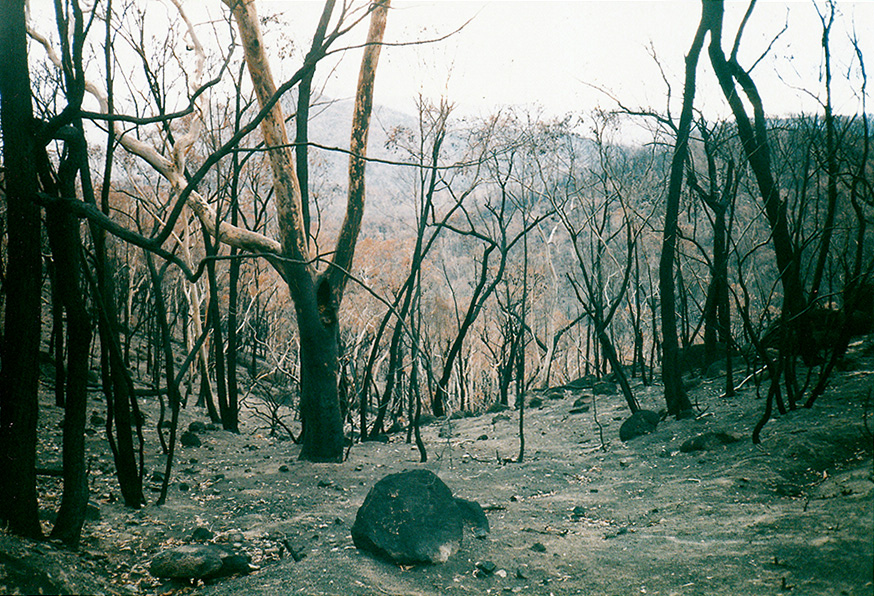
Aftermath of the 2003 Eastern Victorian alpine bushfires, showing the burnt out hillsides alongside the Omeo Highway, near Anglers Rest, Victoria, Australia

In summer 2003, the Australian Alps experienced their largest bushfires for over 60 years, with an estimated 1.73 million hectares burning. The bushfires burnt across Victoria, New South Wales (NSW) and the Australian Capital Territory (ACT) during a drought that ranks as one of the worst in 103 years of official Australian weather records. Fires are a natural feature of the park's ecosystem.

In November 2004, the Snowy Mountains Bushfire Recovery Taskforce was set up by the NSW State Premier's Department to help residents in the region recover from the fires. The Taskforce commissioned Louise Darmody from Sound Memories to produce a documentary involving 26 people from the Snowy Mountains to talk about their experiences. The interviewees included farmers, school children, volunteers and employees from the NSW Rural Fire Service and National Park Snowy Hydro.

Again in 2020, there was a large bushfire in the Snowy Mountains.

== See also ==
- Skiing in Australia
- Snow in Australia
- Bushfires in Australia
