= Australian Alps Walking Track =

Hiking trail in South East Australia

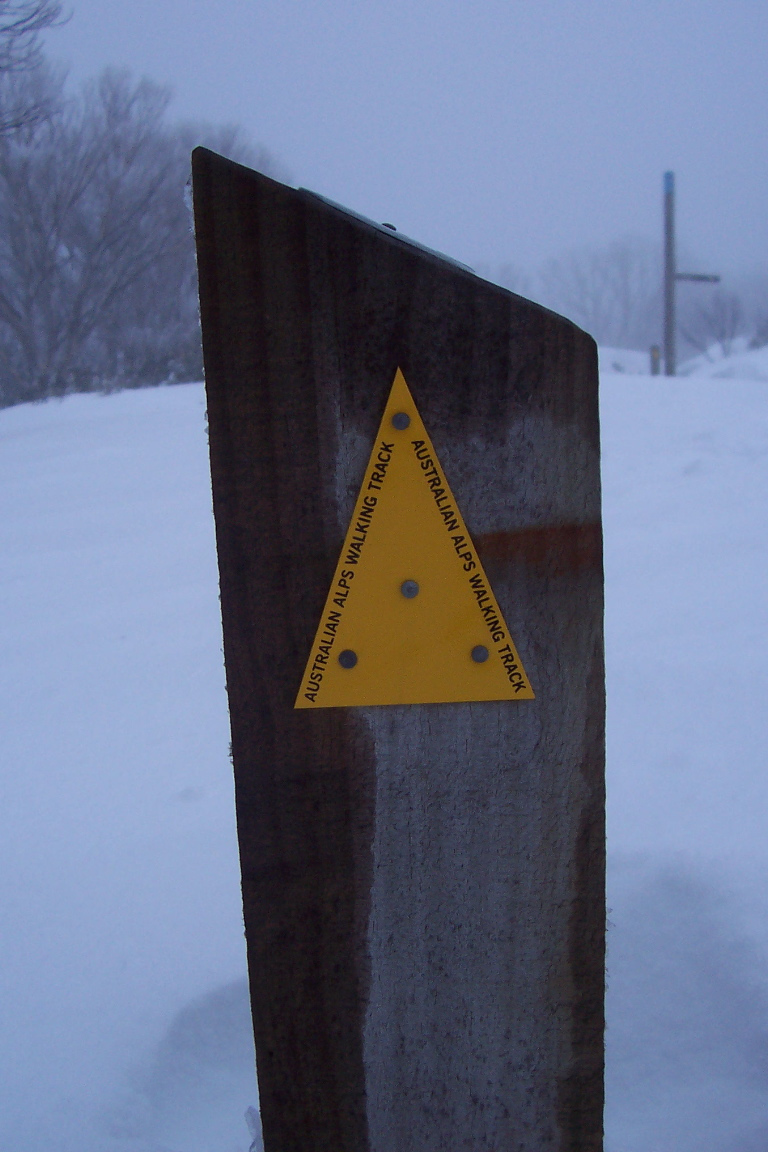
A sign marking the trail on the Bogong High Plains.

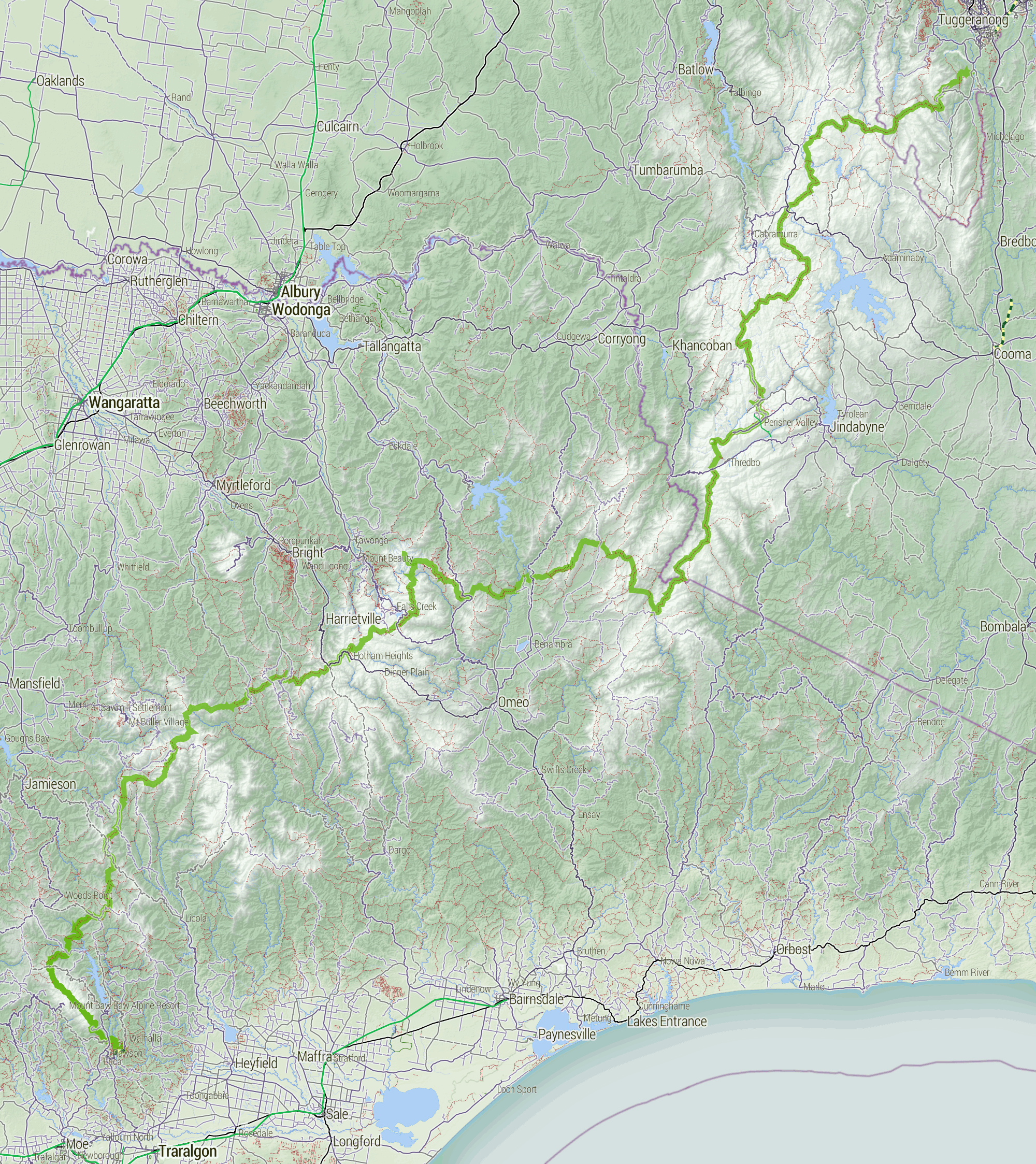
Map of the Australian Alps Walking Track.

The Australian Alps Walking Track is a long-distance walking trail through the alpine areas of Victoria, New South Wales and the ACT. It is 655 km long, starting at Walhalla, Victoria, and running through to Tharwa , near Canberra. The track weaves mainly through Australian national parks, such as Alpine National Park and Kosciuszko National Park, although it is not exclusively restricted to national parks. The official route passes close to many peaks including Mount Kosciuszko, Mount Bogong, and Bimberi Peak, the highest points in NSW, Victoria and the ACT respectively. The AAWT crosses exposed high plains including the Victorian Bogong High Plains and the Main Range in NSW. To walk the whole trail can take between 3 and 8 weeks. Food drops or a support crew are necessary as the trail does not pass through any towns, although it passes close to the ski resorts of Mt Hotham, Falls Creek, Mt Baw Baw, Thredbo, Charlotte Pass and Perisher. There is an active group of AAWT Track Angels able to help walkers by providing transport and food drops.

It has been signposted for part of its length in a tri-state agreement. However, most parts of the Track require hikers to have highly developed navigation skills, particularly in wilderness areas.

The Australian Alps Walking Track is an extension of the older Victorian Alpine Walking Track, established during the 1970s. The Victorian track was extended after many years of promotion by the Federation of Victorian Walking Clubs and various government departments. The NSW stretch of the walk is less imaginative than the Victorian section. Where the Victorian section typically follows spurs and ridges, the NSW section typically follows fire trails/tracks. The route recommended by John Siseman adds some interest to the NSW section of the walk.

Between Walhalla and Tharwa it passes through these National Parks:

- Baw Baw National Park
- Alpine National Park (including Cobberas Wilderness Area), up to the New South Wales border.
- Kosciuszko National Park (including Jagungal Wilderness Area), immediately north of the border.
- Namadgi National Park, adjoining Kosciuszko National Park.
- Brindabella National Park

== Fastest Known Times ==
While most individuals attempting the track take 30–40 days and most groups take 50–60 days to complete the track, the track has been completed in as little as 12 days. The following are the fastest known times for completion of the entire track under 5 categories:

- Mixed-gender self supported team: 11 days 9 hours by John Riley, Kylie Salm and Phil Robinson on 26 November 2019.
- Male self supported: 10 days 23 hours 14 Minutes by Paul Cuthbert & Tom Bartlett on 26 January 2022.
- Male supported: 13 days 11 hours by Beau Miles on 17 March 2011.
- Female self supported: 24 days 0 hours by Emma Timmis on 17 April 2016.
- Unsupported: 19 days, 9 hours 30 minutes by Army Captains Monika Georgieva and Wes Walsh on 28 December 2023.
