= Lake Cootapatamba =

Lake in New South Wales, Australia

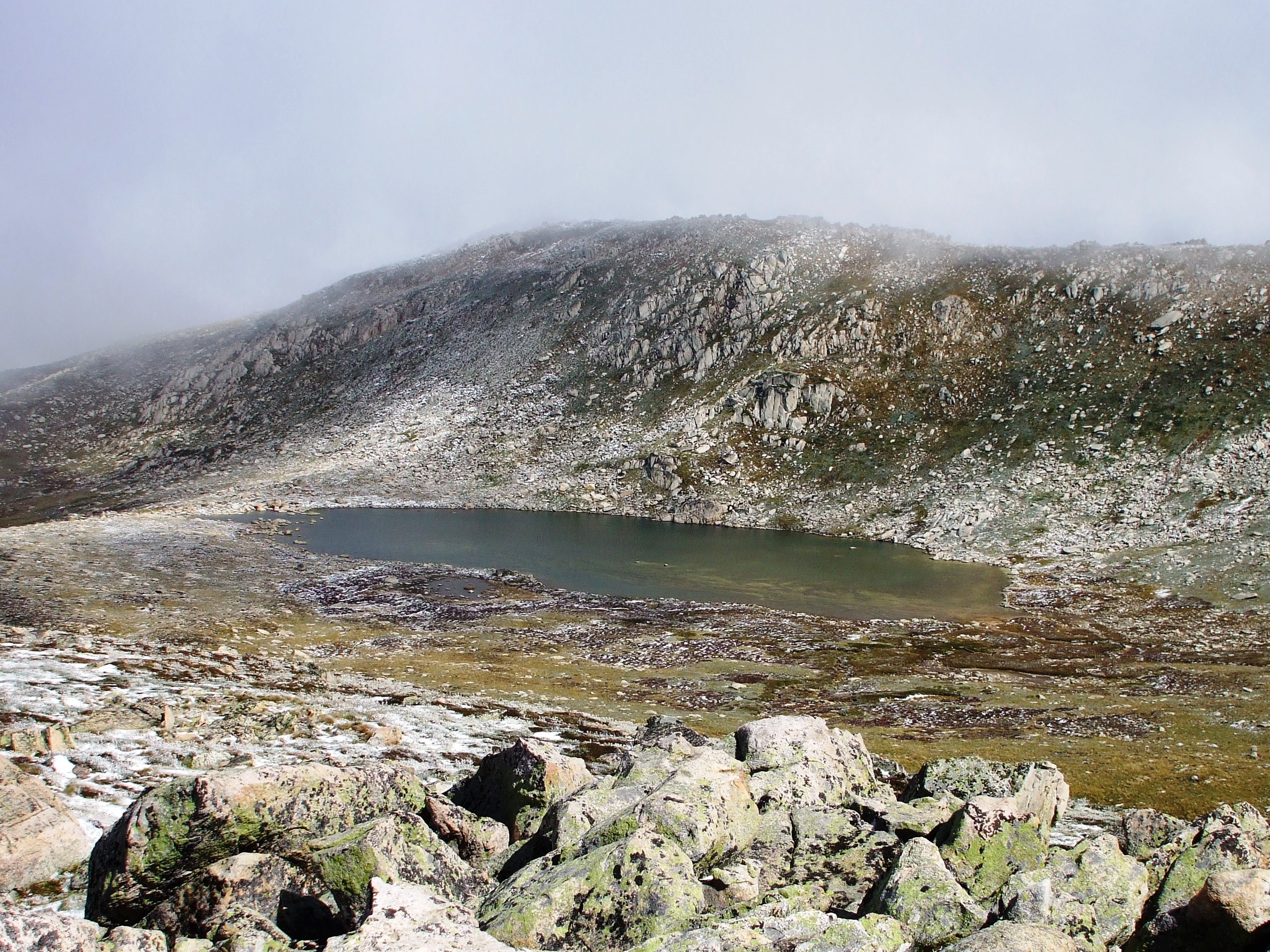
- View of Lake Cootapatamba from the Thredbo-Rawsons Pass walking track

- Location within Australia
- Location: Kosciuszko National Park, New South Wales, Australia
- Coordinates: 36.4652°S 148.2643°E
- Type: Tarn
- Max. length: 400 m (1,300 ft)
- Max. depth: 5 m (16 ft)
- Surface elevation: 2,048 m (6,719 ft)
- Frozen: June to October/November

Lake Cootapatamba is a post-glacial tarn in the Kosciuszko National Park, New South Wales, Australia.

Lake Cootapatamba is located at 2,048 metres, which is about 800 metres south of the summit of Mount Kosciuszko, the highest peak in Australia. It is the highest elevation lake in Australia. It is 400 metres long with a maximum depth of about 5 metres.
