= Kosciuszko Huts Association =

Australian Alpine hut organization

- Company type: Volunteer organisation
- Founded: 1971
- Headquarters: Canberra, Australia
- Area served: Kosciuszko National Park, NSW; Namadgi National Park, ACT
- Website: khuts.org

The Kosciuszko Huts Association (KHA - previously spelt Kosciusko) was formed in Canberra, Australia in 1971 with the purpose of saving the mountain heritage huts in the Kosciuszko National Park. In addition to the physical maintenance of huts, the KHA preserves the history of the huts.

== History ==
The initial meeting was supported by the past Parks commissioner Neville Gare and resulted in a small group of individuals forming the association.

KHA members went on to repair and partially rebuild over 160 mountain huts in the Park over the next decade, despite both accidental and deliberate destruction of some of them by individuals and park officers. The bush fires of 2003 destroyed a further 24 huts, following the collapse of many from the early 1970s through to 2003. There are 79 remaining huts (or groups of huts on one site) in the KNP. In 2006, the KHA was successful in lobbying ministers and the NPWS to include retention of huts in the Kosciuszko National Park Plan of Management. This also included a decision to rebuild at least six of the huts, including the Broken Dam Hut, which was reopened on 15 December 2007. The KHA usually rebuilds historical huts, but in the 1990s also built a new hut, the Burrungubugge Hut.

Since 2007 the rebuilding campaign has progressed rapidly and initially the combination of the Kosciuszko National Park rangers and KHA members completed the build of O'Keefes Hut, Pretty Plain Hut and others.

Since the construction of the original web site for KHA the site has grown to 3000 pages of information. The first site was built by members of Wildtwo Pty Ltd who held the copyright but have formally given approval for use of all the text and photographs to the KHA in perpetuity, to support the continued collection of material on the mountain huts across Australia.

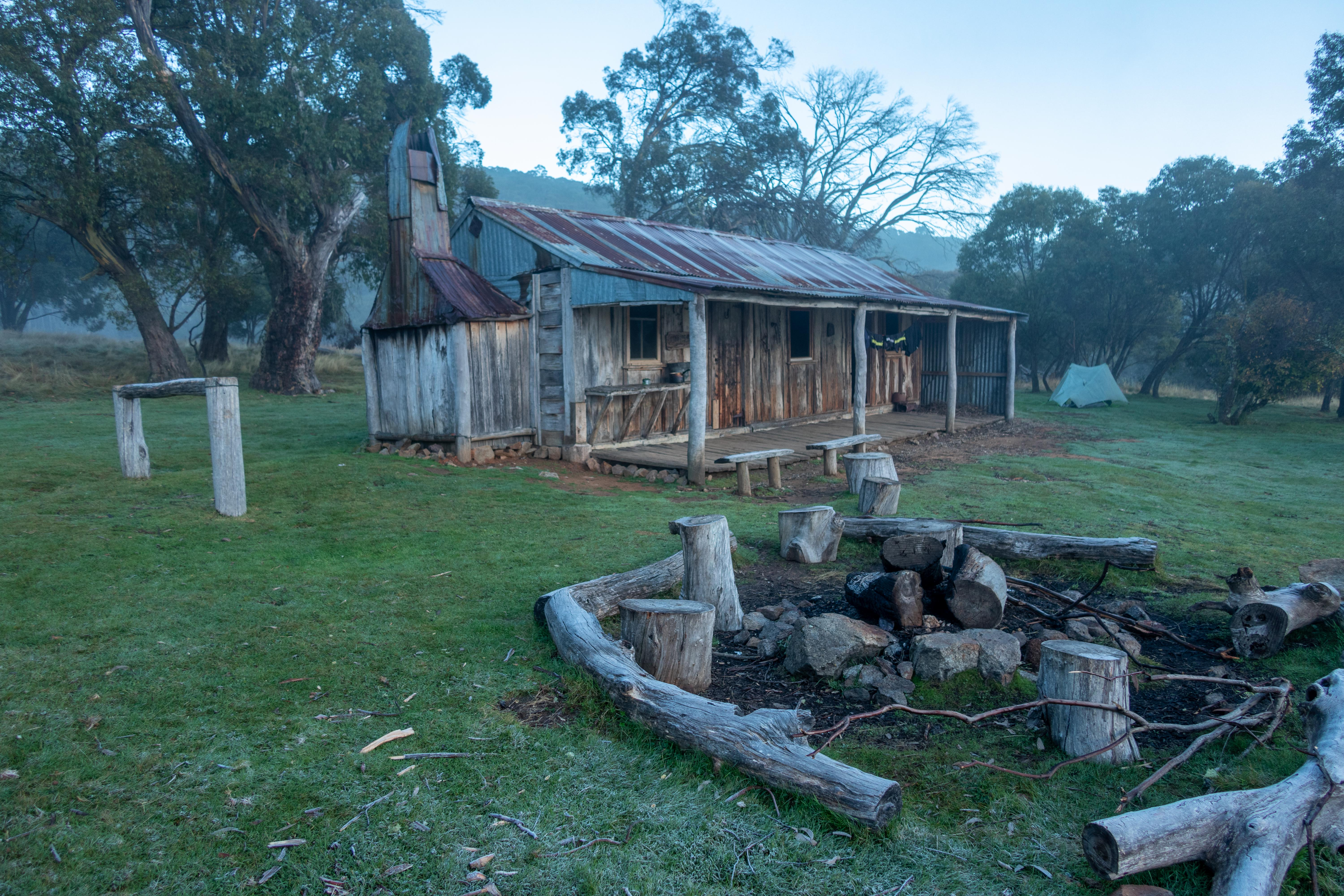
A hut in Kosciuszki National Park.

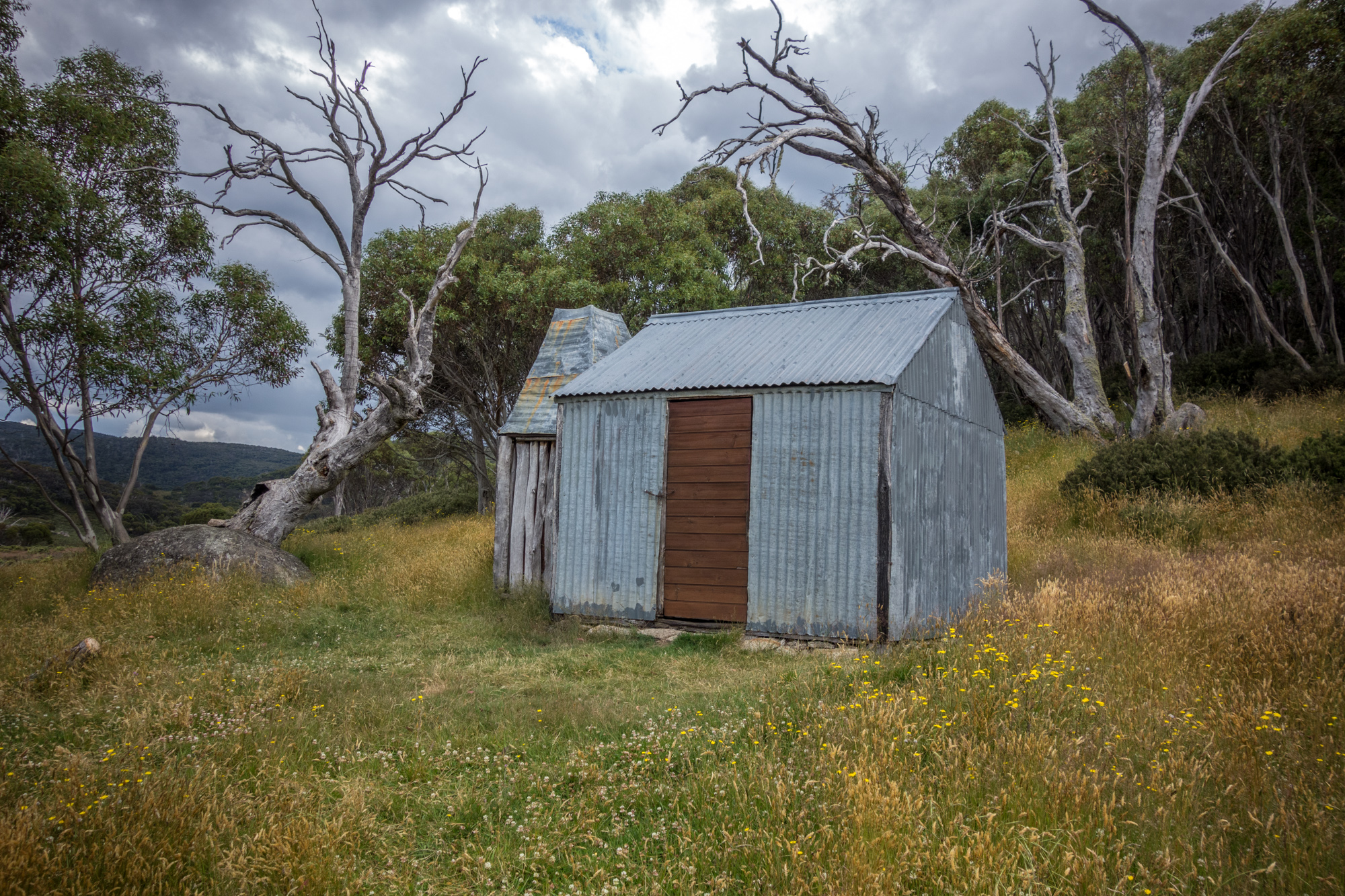
Kidman's Hut, Kosciuszko National Park, NSW, Australia

Australian Geographic published a feature article on the KHA in June 2022, emphasising the skill required to rebuild huts while maintaining their cultural and historical qualities.

== Impact of 2019-2020 bushfires ==
Following the 2019-2020 bushfires 12 huts were destroyed: "Everybody was distraught...In some cases, they [KHA volunteers] had worked hard to reconstruct some of them after the last fires [in 2003] and then they got lost again" reported president Simon Buckpitt. Assessment and recording of the damage involved ongoing consultation between the NSW National Parks & Wildlife Service and the KHA (the huts are cared for cooperatively by KHA and the NPWS) and while KHA expressed concern that some huts may not be rebuilt, in 2021after 18 months of assessment, it was confirmed that 10 would be rebuilt.

== Records and archives ==
The "gathering of associated historical information is an integral part" of the KHA mission of "maintaining historic and shelter huts". The group has collected oral history about the huts. Two books by Klaus Hueneke also document this work, combining information about hiking trails with historical and cultural information. The records of the KHA are archived in the National Library of Australia, as well as the KHA collections of photographs, as well as the Francis Leyden collection.

== Newsletter ==
- Kosciusko Huts Association (1971), Newsletter, The Association
- Kosciusko Huts Association (2019), Kosciuszko Huts Association Newsletter, Kosciuszko Huts Association
