= List of mountains in Australia =

This is a list of mountains in Australia.

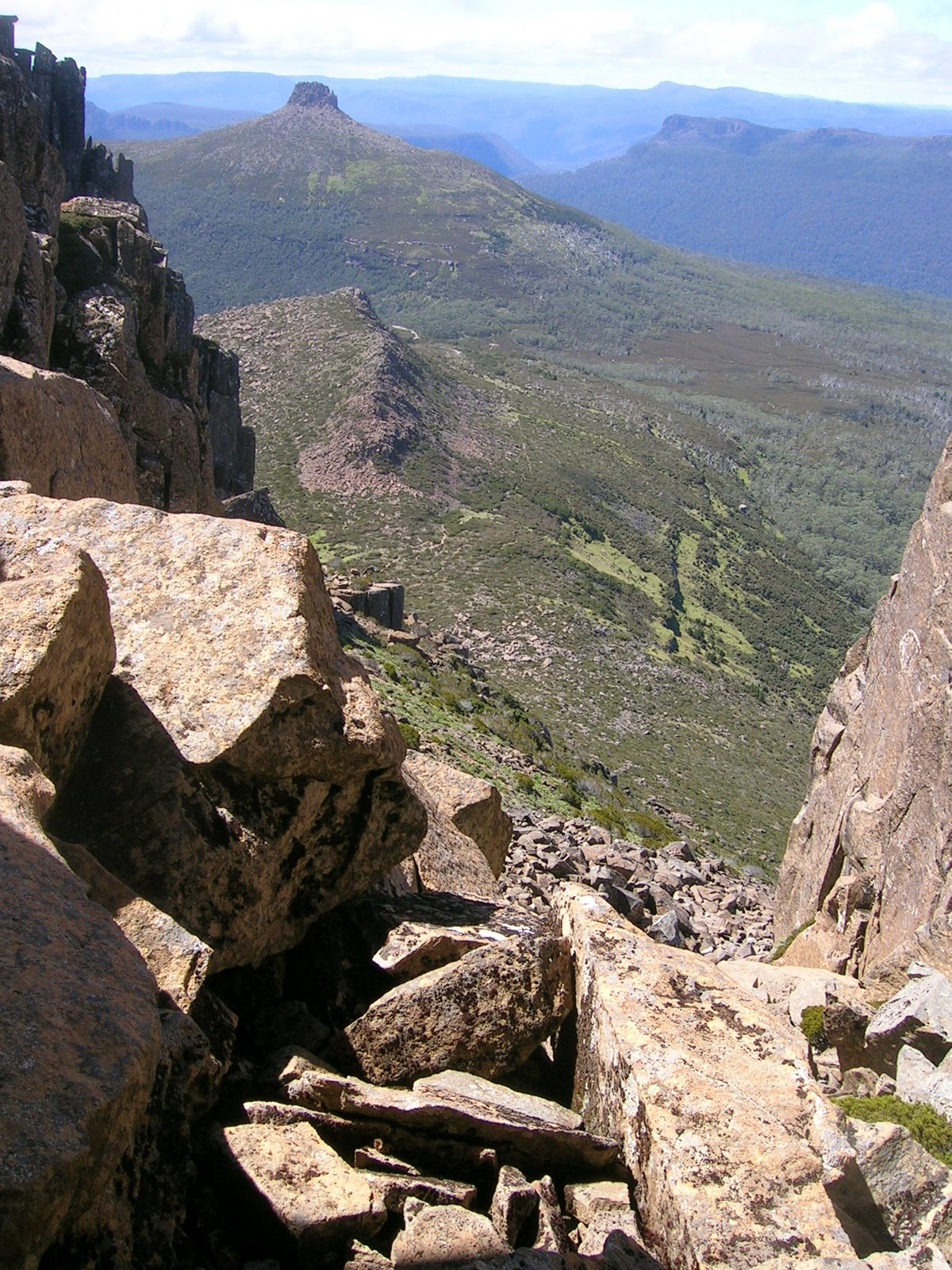
Looking east back down the chimney on Mount Ossa towards Pelion East, in Tasmania.

== Highest points by state and territory ==
State / Territory	Highest point	Elevation (AHD)	Notes
Ashmore and Cartier Islands	Cartier Island	5 metres (16 ft)	
Australian Antarctic Territory	Dome A	4,093 metres (13,428 ft)	
Australian Capital Territory	Bimberi Peak	1,913 metres (6,276 ft)	
Christmas Island	Murray Hill	361 metres (1,184 ft)	
Cocos (Keeling) Islands	South Island	9 metres (30 ft)	
Coral Sea Islands	Heralds-Beacon Islet, Mellish Reef	1.5 metres (4 ft 11 in)	
Heard Island and McDonald Islands	Mawson Peak	2,745 metres (9,006 ft)	the summit of the Big Ben massif
Jervis Bay Territory	Cape St George, Booderee National Park	164 metres (538 ft)	
New South Wales	Mount Kosciuszko	2,228 metres (7,310 ft)	
Norfolk Island	Mount Bates	319 metres (1,047 ft)	
Northern Territory	Mount Zeil	1,531 metres (5,023 ft)	
Queensland	Mount Bartle Frere	1,622 metres (5,322 ft)	
South Australia	Ngarutjaranya	1,435 metres (4,708 ft)	
Tasmania	Mount Ossa	1,614 metres (5,295 ft)	
Victoria	Mount Bogong	1,986 metres (6,516 ft)	
Western Australia	Mount Meharry	1,253 metres (4,111 ft)	

== List of mountains in Australia by topographic prominence ==
This is a list of the top 50 mountains in Australia ranked by topographic prominence. Most of these peaks are the highest point in their areas.

	Peak	Absolute height (m)	Topographic prominence (m)	Prominence parent	State	Location
1	Mount Kosciuszko	2,228	2,228	none – HP Australia	NSW	HP New South Wales, Snowy Mountains
2	Mount Ossa	1,617	1,617	none – HP Tasmania	TAS	HP Tasmania, Central Highlands
3	Mount Zeil	1,531	1,322	Mount Kosciuszko	NT	HP Northern Territory, MacDonnell Ranges
4	Mount Bartle Frere	1,611	1,316	Mount Kosciuszko	QLD	HP Queensland, Bellenden Ker Range, Cairns
5	Legges Tor	1,573	1,302	Mount Ossa	TAS	Ben Lomond Range
6	Mount Bogong	1,986	1,233	Mount Kosciuszko	VIC	HP Victoria, Victorian Alps
7	Mount Bellenden Ker	1,582	1,222	Mount Bartle Frere	QLD	Bellenden Ker Range
8	Mount Elliot	1,218	1,170	Mount Bartle Frere	QLD	Townsville
9	Mount Bowen	1,121	1,121	none – HP Hinchinbrook Island	QLD	Hinchinbrook Island
10	Thornton Peak	1,374	1,114	Mount Bartle Frere	QLD	Daintree
11	Brumlow Top	1,586	1,103	Mount Kosciuszko	NSW	Barrington Tops
12	St Mary Peak	1,189	1,047	Brumlow Top	SA	Flinders Ranges
13	Mount Picton	1,327	1,024	Mount Ossa	TAS	Southwest National Park
14	Bell Peak North	1,026	1,011	Mount Bartle Frere	QLD	Grey Peaks National Park, Cairns
15	Mount Carbine Tableland	1,383	1,000	Mount Bartle Frere	QLD	Daintree
16	Mount William	1,259	997	Brumlow Top	QLD	Clarke Range, Mackay
17	Mount Field West	1,435	981	Mount Ossa	TAS	Mount Field National Park
18	Mount Warning	1,159	973	Brumlow Top	NSW	Tweed Range
19	Frenchmans Cap	1,446	969	Mount Ossa	TAS	Franklin-Gordon Wild Rivers National Park
20	Mount Anne	1,423	963	Mount Field West	TAS	Southwest National Park
21	Ngarutjaranya	1435	949	Mount Zeil	SA	HP South Australia, Musgrave Ranges
22	Mount Jukes	1,169	934	Mount Ossa	TAS	West Coast Range
23	Snowy South	1,398	928	Mount Field West	TAS	Snowy Range
24	Mount William	1,167	893	Mount Bogong	VIC	Grampians National Park
25	Consuelo Tableland	1,232	887	Brumlow Top	QLD	Carnarvon National Park
26	Mount Gower	875	875	none – HP Lord Howe Island	NSW	Lord Howe Island
27	Mount Abbot	1,059	873	Mount William	QLD	Bowen
28	Mount Finnigan	1148	870	Mount Carbine Tableland	QLD	Far North Queensland
29	Mount Kaputar	1,510	860	Brumlow Top	NSW	Nandewar Range
30	Bluff Knoll	1,099	854	Ngarutjaranya	WA	Stirling Range
31	Mount Buller	1,805	853	Mount Bogong	VIC	Victorian Alps
32	Mount Meharry	1,249	839	Ngarutjaranya	WA	HP Western Australia
33	Hartz Peak	1,254	838	Mount Picton	TAS	Hartz Mountains
34	Mount Bithongabel	1,195	820	Brumlow Top	QLD/NSW	Macpherson Range, Lamington National Park
35	HP Blue Mountains	1,058	817	Mount William	QLD	Isaac Region, nr Mackay
36	Mount Superbus	1,371	815	Brumlow Top	QLD	South East Queensland
37	Propsting Range	894	810	Mount Anne	TAS	Southwest National Park
38	Mount Barrow	1,414	807	Legges Tor	TAS	Tasmanian Northern Slopes, nr Launceston
39	Mount Weld	1,345	806	Mount Anne	TAS	Southwest National Park
40	Federation Peak	1,225	805	Mount Picton	TAS	Southwest National Park, Arthur Range
41	Mount Dryander	820	793	Mount William	QLD	Whitsunday Region
42	Strzelecki Peaks	782	782	none – HP Flinders Island	TAS	Strzelecki National Park, Flinders Island
43	HP Normanby Range	805	777	HP Blue Mountains	QLD	Shoalwater Bay
44	Mount Owen	1,146	776	Mount Ossa	TAS	West Coast Range, nr Queenstown
45	Frankland Peak	1,083	775	Mount Anne	TAS	Southwest National Park, Frankland Range
46	Mount Barney	1,359	766	Mount Superbus	QLD	Scenic Rim, South East Queensland
47	Mount Murchison	1,278	763	Mount Ossa	TAS	Mount Murchison Regional Reserve, West Coast
48	Clear Hill	1,198	758	Mount Field West	TAS	Lake Gordon
49	Round Mountain	1,584	744	Brumlow Top	NSW	New England, Northern Tablelands
50	Mount Latrobe	754	744	Mount Buller	VIC	Wilsons Promontory, Gippsland

== Australian Capital Territory ==
The following is a list of mountains and prominent hills in the Australian Capital Territory in order, from the highest peak to the lowest peak, for those mountains and hills with an elevation above 750 metres (2,460 ft) AHD:

Order	Highest peak	Range / nature reserve	Elevation AHD		Image	Notes
Order	Highest peak	Range / nature reserve	m	ft	Image	Notes
1	Bimberi Peak	Brindabella Ranges, Great Dividing Range	1,913	6,276		
2	Mount Gingera	Brindabella Ranges, Great Dividing Range	1,857	6,093		The most prominent snow-covered peak to be seen from Canberra in winter.
3	Mount Kelly	Brindabella Ranges, Great Dividing Range	1,814	5,951		
4	Mount Scabby	Brindabella Ranges, Great Dividing Range	1,790	5,873		
5	Mount Namadgi	Brindabella Ranges, Great Dividing Range	1,782	5,846		
6	Ginger Ale	Brindabella Ranges, Great Dividing Range	1,766	5,794		
7	Mount Ginini	Brindabella Ranges, Great Dividing Range	1,762	5,781		
8	Mount Burbidge	Brindabella Ranges, Great Dividing Range	1,730	5,676		
9	Mount Gudgenby	Brindabella Ranges, Great Dividing Range	1,719	5,640		
10	Sentry Box Mountain	Brindabella Ranges, Great Dividing Range	1,718	5,636		
11	Little Bimberi	Brindabella Ranges, Great Dividing Range	1,654	5,427		
12	Mount Franklin	Brindabella Ranges, Great Dividing Range	1,646	5,400		
13	Mavis Ridge	Brindabella Ranges, Great Dividing Range	1,618	5,308		
14	Mount McKeahnie	Brindabella Ranges, Great Dividing Range	1,588	5,210		
15	Mount Tidbinbilla	Brindabella Ranges, Great Dividing Range	1,583	5,194		
16	The Pimple	Brindabella Ranges, Great Dividing Range	1,501	4,925		
17	Mount Majura	Canberra Nature Park	890	2,920		
18	Mount Taylor	Canberra Nature Park	856	2,808		
19	Tuggeranong Hill	Canberra Nature Park	855	2,805		
20	Mount Ainslie	Canberra Nature Park	842	2,762		
21	Black Mountain	Canberra Nature Park	812	2,664		
22	Mount Wanniassa	Canberra Nature Park	809	2,654		
23	Mount Stromlo		770	2,526		

== New South Wales ==
=== Barrington Tops ===
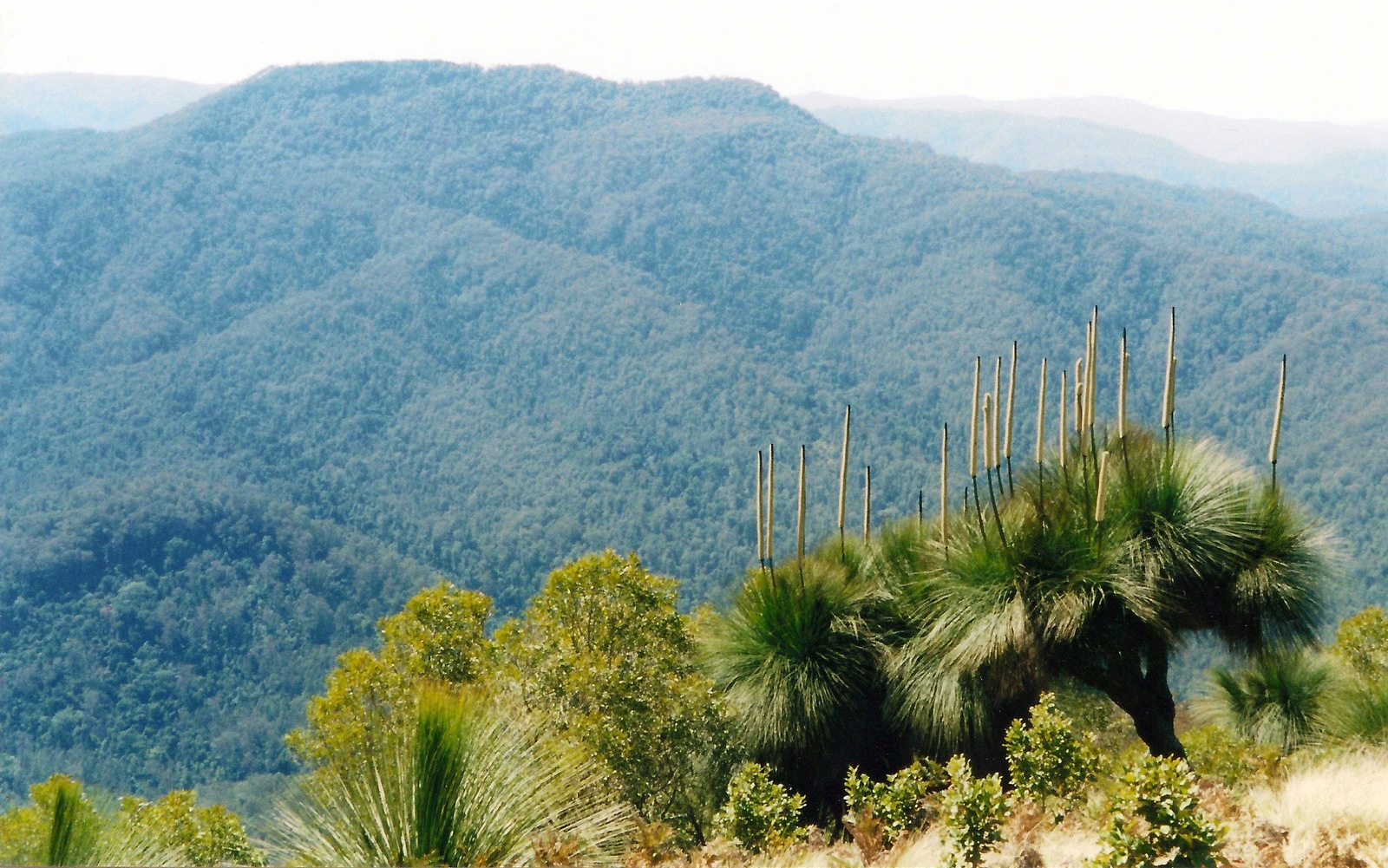
Mount Allyn in the background, viewed from Mount Cabrebald.

- Mountains located within the Barrington Tops
  - Brumlow Tops, at 1,586 metres (5,203 ft)
  - Mount Polblue, at 1,575 metres (5,167 ft)
  - Mount Barrington, at 1,555 metres (5,102 ft)
  - Careys Peak, at 1,544 metres (5,066 ft)
  - Mount Royal, at 1,185 metres (3,888 ft)
  - Mount Allyn, at 1,125 metres (3,691 ft)
  - Mount Cabrebald, at 1,000 metres (3,300 ft)

=== Blue Mountains ===
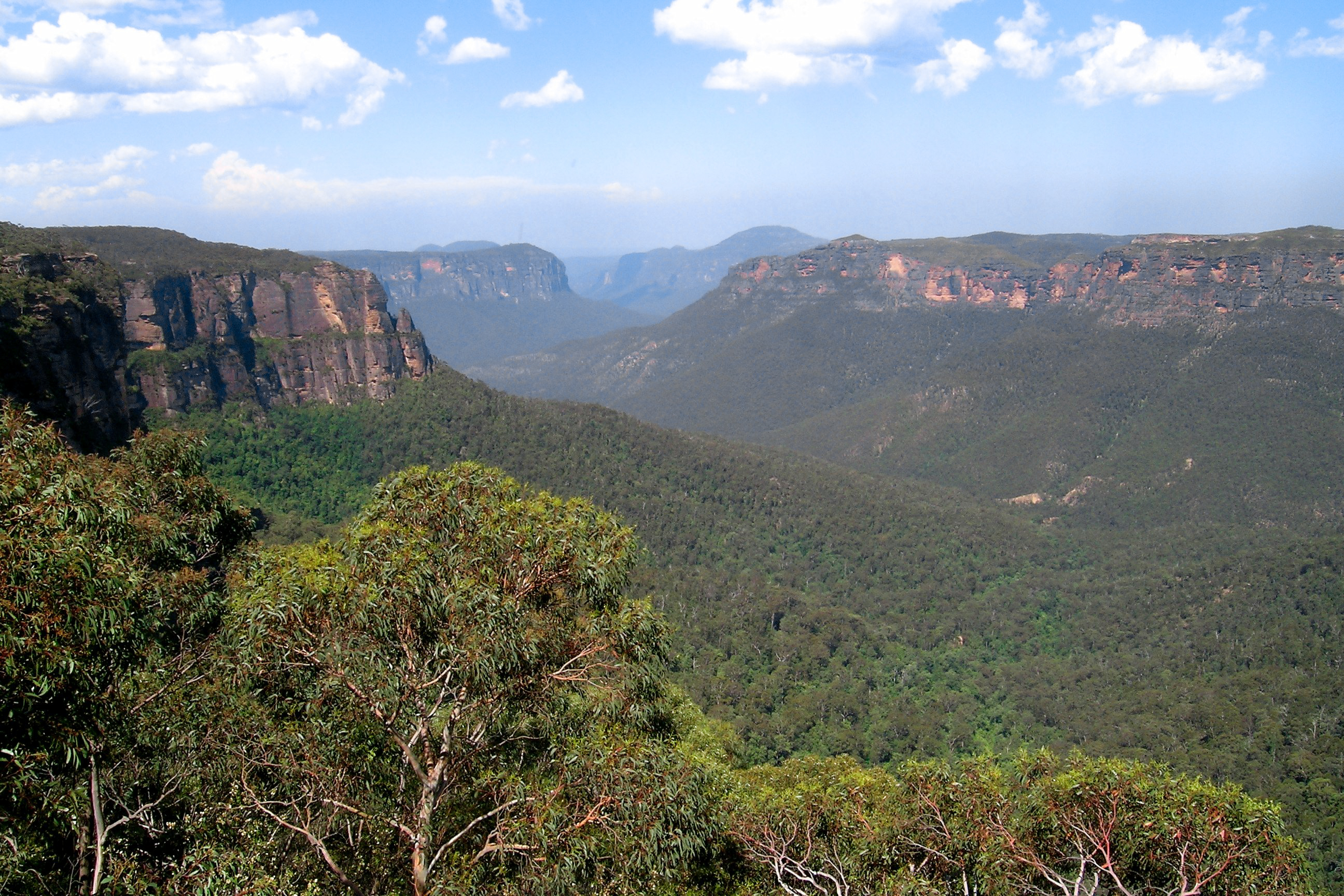
Blue Mountains.

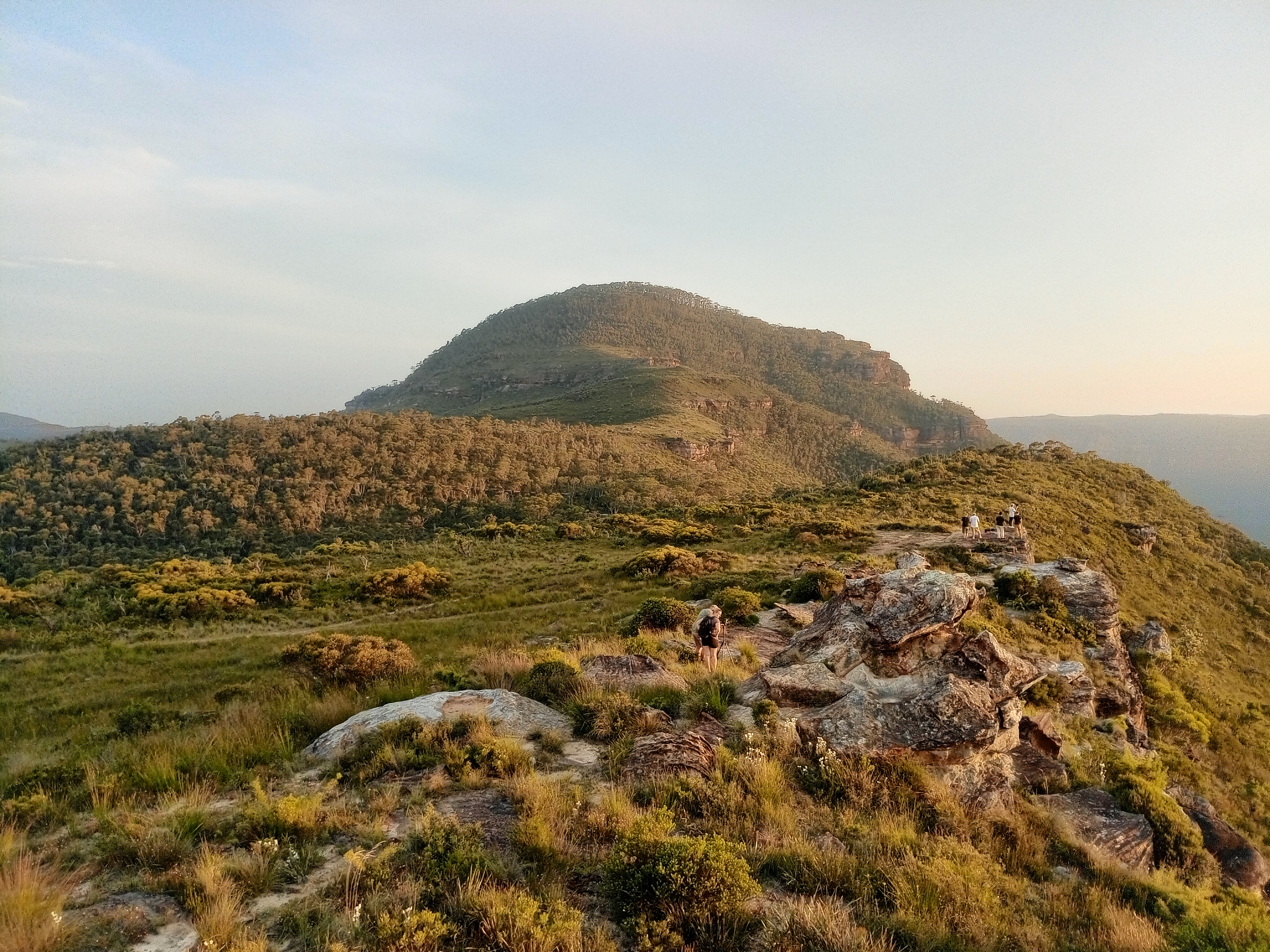
Mount Banks on the Explorer's Range in the Blue Mountains.

- Mountains located within the Blue Mountains
  - Mount Coricudgy, at 1,255 metres (4,117 ft)
  - Mount Pomany, at 1,109 metres (3,638 ft)
  - Mount Piddington, at 1,094 metres (3,589 ft)
  - Mount Boyce, at 1,093 metres (3,586 ft)
  - Mount Banks, at 1,062 metres (3,484 ft)
  - Mount York, at 1,061 metres (3,481 ft)
  - Mount Victoria, at 1,059 metres (3,474 ft)
  - Mount Tomah, at 1,016 metres (3,333 ft)
  - Mount Wilson, at 1,008 metres (3,307 ft)
  - Narrow Neck, at 1,000 metres (3,300 ft)
  - Kings Tableland, at 1,000 metres (3,300 ft)
  - Castle Cliff, at 986 metres (3,235 ft)
  - Mount Solitary, at 950 metres (3,120 ft)
  - Mount Hay, at 944 metres (3,097 ft)
  - Podgers, at 890 metres (2,920 ft)
  - Mount Irvine, at 850 metres (2,790 ft)
  - Mount Debert, at 840 metres (2,760 ft)
  - Camp Cave Hill, at 800 metres (2,600 ft)
  - Warrigal Hill, at 760 metres (2,490 ft)
  - Notts Hill, at 750 metres (2,460 ft)
  - Harris Hill, at 736 metres (2,415 ft)
  - Centre Mount, at 620 metres (2,030 ft)
  - Mount Hall, at 617 metres (2,024 ft)
  - Mount Gibson, at 608 metres (1,995 ft)
  - Scorpion Hill, at 558 metres (1,831 ft)
  - Linda Rock, at 599 metres (1,965 ft)
  - Mount Cookem, at 569 metres (1,867 ft)
  - Gospers Mountain
  - Mount Bedford
  - Mount Cameron
  - Mount Coriaday
  - Mount Erskine
  - Mount Mistake
  - Mount Monundilla
  - Mount Whaite
  - Mount Wirraba
  - Pearces Mountain

=== Budawang Range ===
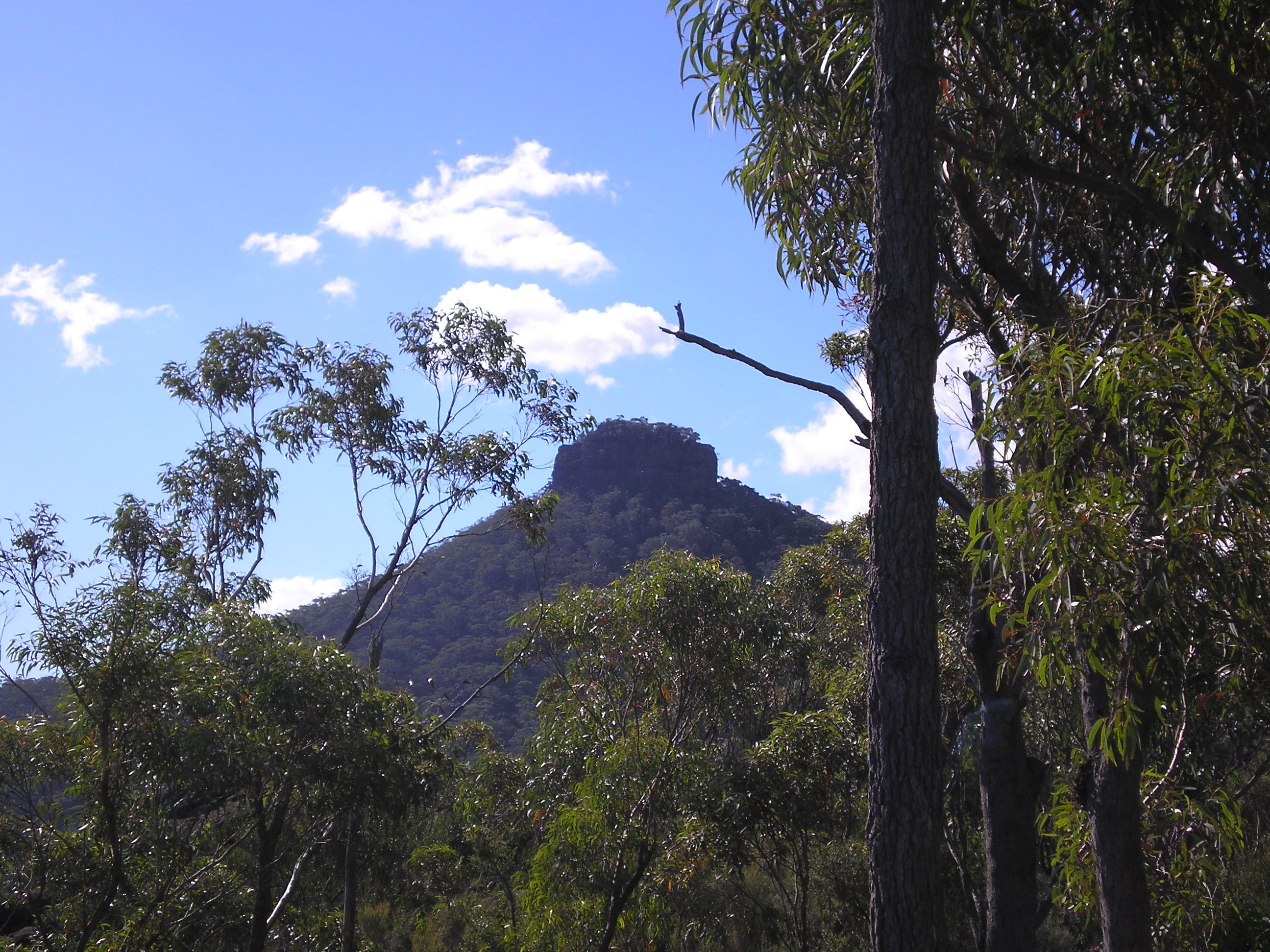
Pigeon House Mountain within the Budawang Range.

- Mountains located within the Budawang Range
  - Pigeon House Mountain, at 720 metres (2,360 ft)

=== Gibraltar Range ===
- Mountains located within the Gibraltar Range
  - The Summit 1,170 metres (3,840 ft)

=== Great Dividing Range ===
- Mountains located within the Great Dividing Range in New South Wales

==== Central Tablelands ====
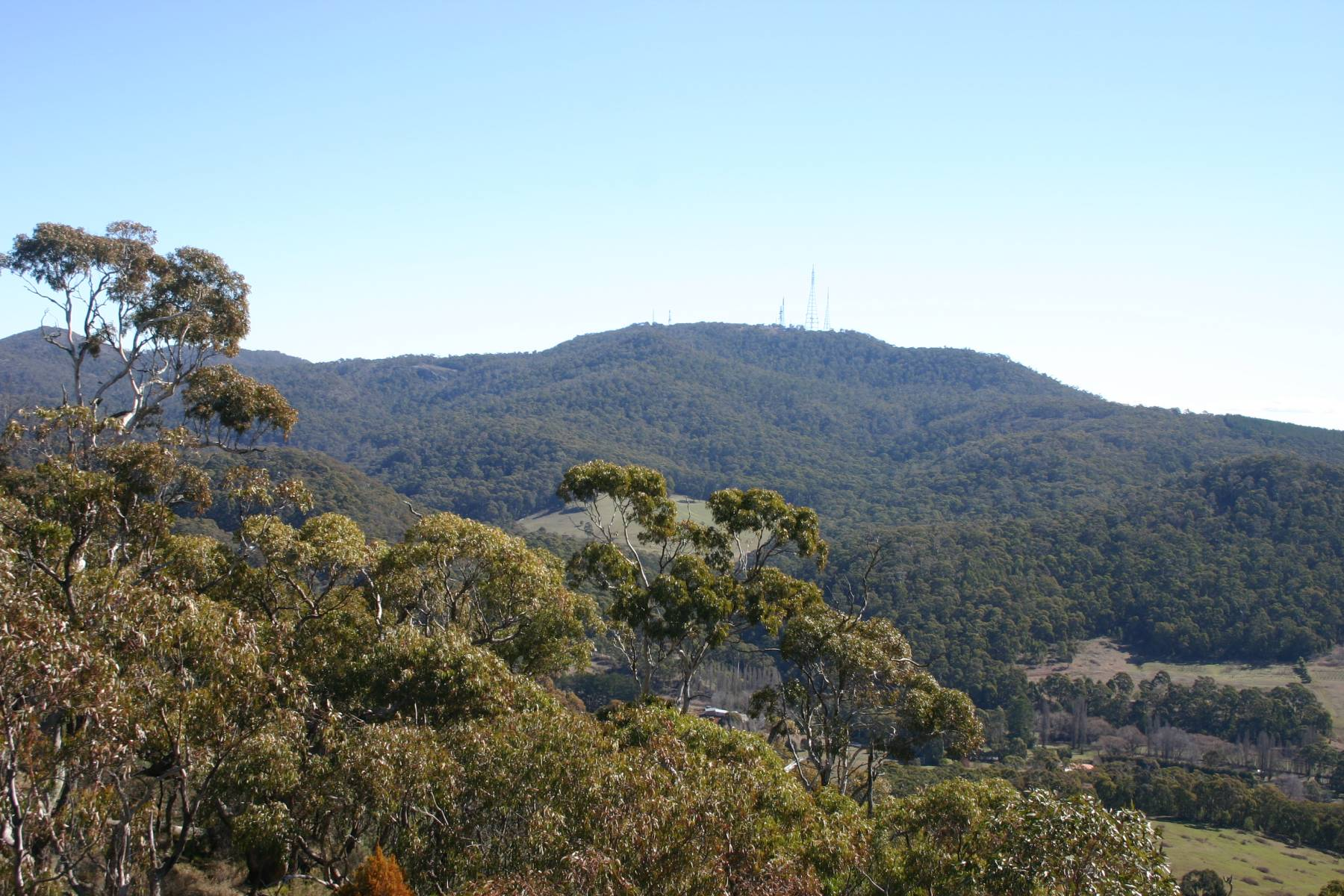
Mount Canobolas as viewed from the Pinnacles, near Orange.

- Mountains located within the Central Tablelands
  - Mount Canobolas, at 1,395 metres (4,577 ft)
  - Mount Bindo, at 1,363 metres (4,472 ft)
  - Mount Trickett, at 1,362 metres (4,469 ft)
  - Manna Mountain, at 438 metres (1,437 ft)
  - Mount Hopeless

==== Mid North Coast region ====
- Mountains located within the Mid North Coast region
  - Mount Banda Banda, at 1,258 metres (4,127 ft)
  - Big Nellie Mountain

==== Monaro region ====
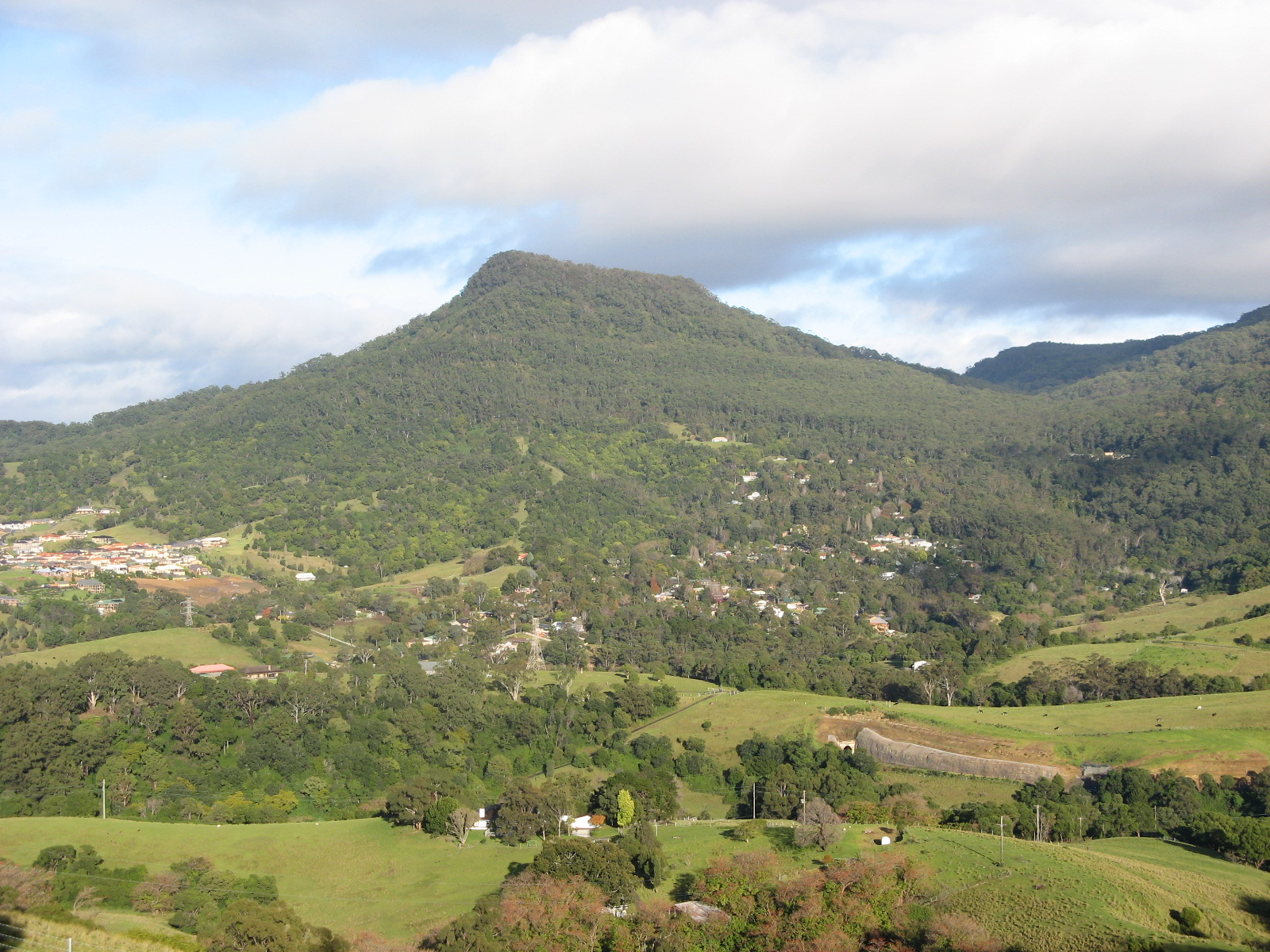
Mount Kembla viewed from Mount Nebo.

- Mountains located within the Monaro region
  - Brown Mountain, at 1,243 metres (4,078 ft)

=== Illawarra escarpment ===
- Mountains located within the Illawarra escarpment
  - Bells Hill, at 803 metres (2,635 ft)
  - Knights Hill, at 709 metres (2,326 ft)
  - Noorinan Mountain, at 663 metres (2,175 ft)
  - Saddleback Mountain, at 600 metres (2,000 ft)
  - Wanyambilli Hill, at 564 metres (1,850 ft)
  - Mount Kembla, at 534 metres (1,752 ft)
  - Burelli Mountain, at 531 metres (1,742 ft)
  - Mount Kembla West, at 512 metres (1,680 ft)
  - Mount Brisbane, at 469 metres (1,539 ft)
  - Mount Keira, at 464 metres (1,522 ft)
  - Warra Mountain, at 464 metres (1,522 ft)
  - Brokers Nose, at 440 metres (1,440 ft)
  - Mount Nebo, at 252 metres (827 ft)

=== Liverpool Range ===
- Mountains located within the Liverpool Range
  - Crawney Mountain, at 1,446 metres (4,744 ft)
  - Wombramurra Mountain, at 1,418 metres (4,652 ft)
  - Bald Hill (NSW), at 1,280 metres (4,200 ft)
  - Mount Temi, at 1,256 metres (4,121 ft)
  - East Bluff, at 1,240 metres (4,070 ft)
  - Mount Tingaroo, at 1,224 metres (4,016 ft)
  - Towarri Mountain, at 1,140 metres (3,740 ft)
  - Mount Moan, at 1,130 metres (3,710 ft)
  - Wedding Cake Peak, at 1,022 metres (3,353 ft)

=== Lord Howe Island ===
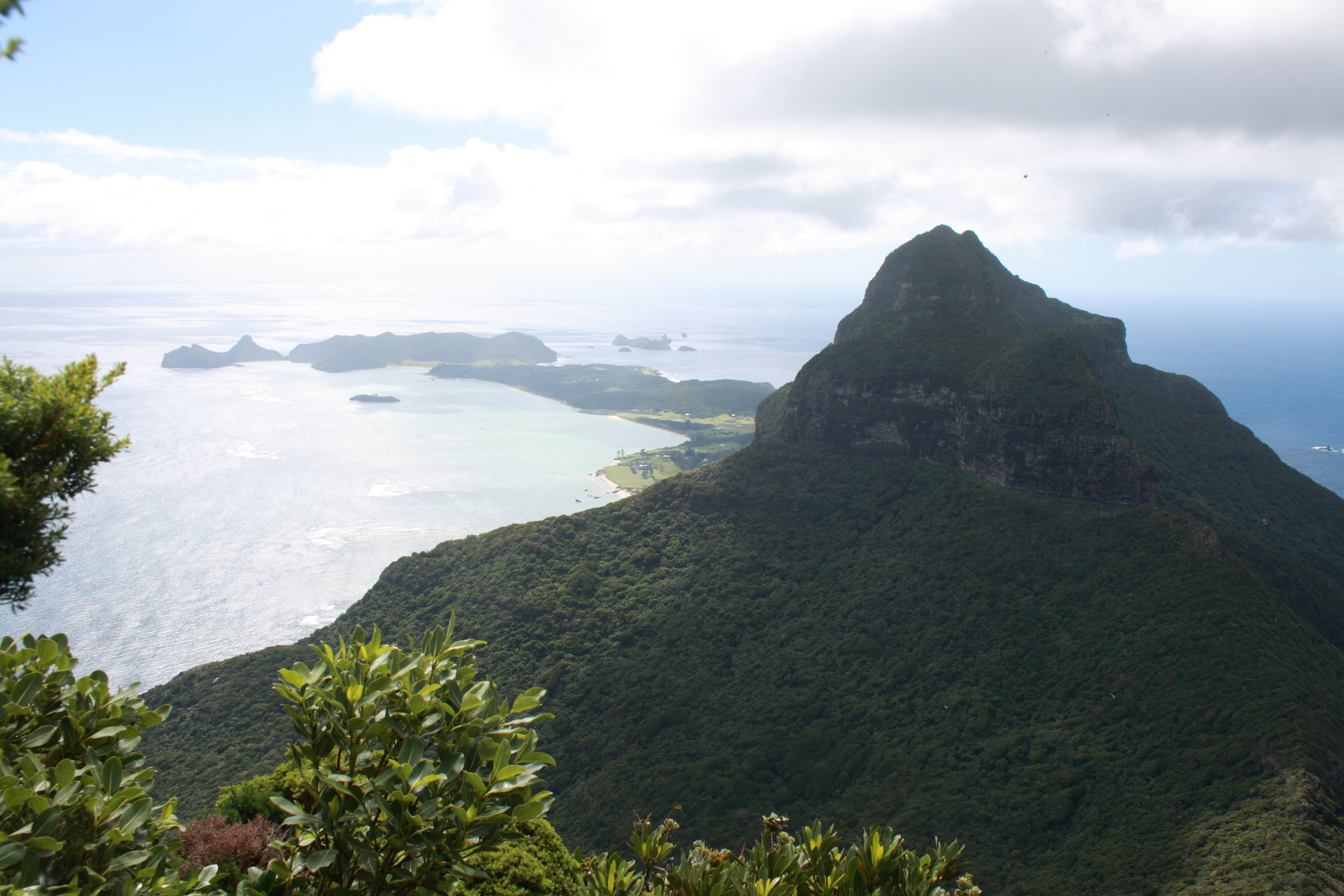
Mount Lidgbird on Lord Howe Island

- Mountains located on Lord Howe Island
  - Mount Gower, at 875 metres (2,871 ft)
  - Mount Lidgbird, at 777 metres (2,549 ft)

=== McPherson Range ===
- Mountains located within the McPherson Range
  - Mount Barney, at 1,359 metres (4,459 ft)
  - Haystack Mountain (New South Wales)

=== Moonbi Range ===
- Mountains located within the Moonbi Range
  - Black Jack Mountain, at 1,323 metres (4,341 ft)
  - Mount Gulligal, at 1,243 metres (4,078 ft)
  - Den Mountain, at 1,120 metres (3,670 ft)

=== Nandewar Range ===
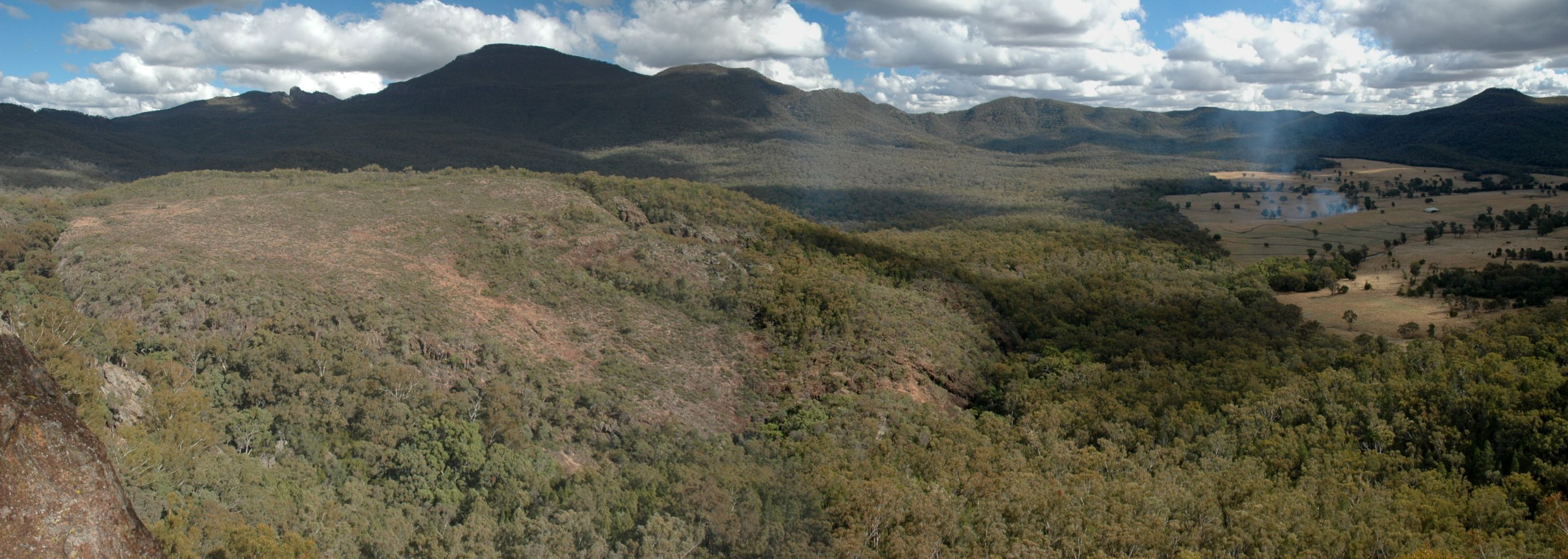
Grattai Mountain in the Nandewar Range.

- Mountains located within the Nandewar Range
  - Mount Kaputar, at 1,508 metres (4,948 ft)
  - Mount Dowe, at 1,457 metres (4,780 ft)
  - Mount Coryah, at 1,409 metres (4,623 ft)
  - Mount Lindesay, at 1,373 metres (4,505 ft)
  - Grattai Mountain, at 1,301 metres (4,268 ft)
  - Bushy Mountain, at 1,250 metres (4,100 ft)
  - Round Mountain, at 1,250 metres (4,100 ft)
  - Mount Yulludunida, at 1,225 metres (4,019 ft)
  - Castle Top Mountain, at 1,120 metres (3,670 ft)
  - Gins Mountain, at 1,120 metres (3,670 ft)
  - Mount Ningadhun, at 1,013 metres (3,323 ft)

=== New England Tableland ===
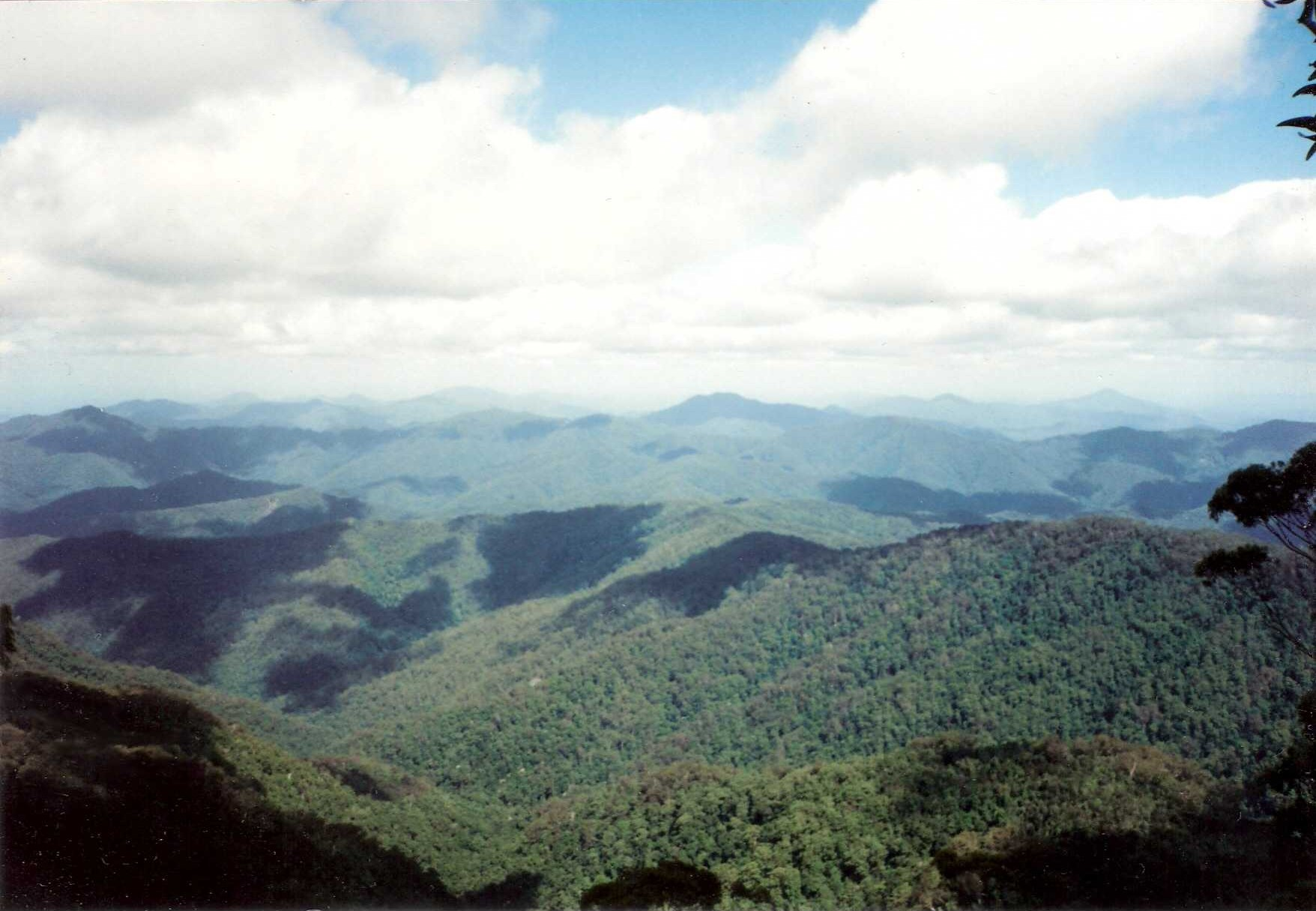
The view from Point Lookout.

- Mountains located within the New England Tableland
  - Round Mountain, at 1,585 metres (5,200 ft)
  - Point Lookout, at 1,564 metres (5,131 ft)
  - The Brothers (Ben Lomond), at 1,509 metres (4,951 ft)
  - Mount Rumbee, at 1,506 metres (4,941 ft)
  - Ben Lomond (New South Wales), at 1,505 metres (4,938 ft)
  - The Magistrate (Capoompeta), at 1,502 metres (4,928 ft)
  - Big Mount Spirabo, at 1,491 metres (4,892 ft)
  - Mount Duncan (New South Wales), at 1,478 metres (4,849 ft)
  - Mount Mitchell (New South Wales), at 1,476 metres (4,843 ft)
  - Chandlers Peak, at 1,473 metres (4,833 ft)
  - Mount Grundy, at 1,463 metres (4,800 ft)
  - Mount Bajimba, at 1,445 metres (4,741 ft)
  - Mount Hyland, at 1,434 metres (4,705 ft)
  - Mount Duval, at 1,393 metres (4,570 ft)
  - Mount MacKenzie, at 1,287 metres (4,222 ft)
  - Cunglebung Mountain, at 1,035 metres (3,396 ft)
  - Bolivia Hill, at 1,010 metres (3,310 ft)

=== Nightcap Range ===
- Mountains located within the Nightcap Range
  - Mount Burrell, at 933 metres (3,061 ft)
  - Mount Neville, at 919 metres (3,015 ft)
  - Mount Nardi, at 812 metres (2,664 ft)
  - Mount Matheson, at 804 metres (2,638 ft)
  - Peates Mountain, at 604 metres (1,982 ft)

=== Snowy Mountains ===
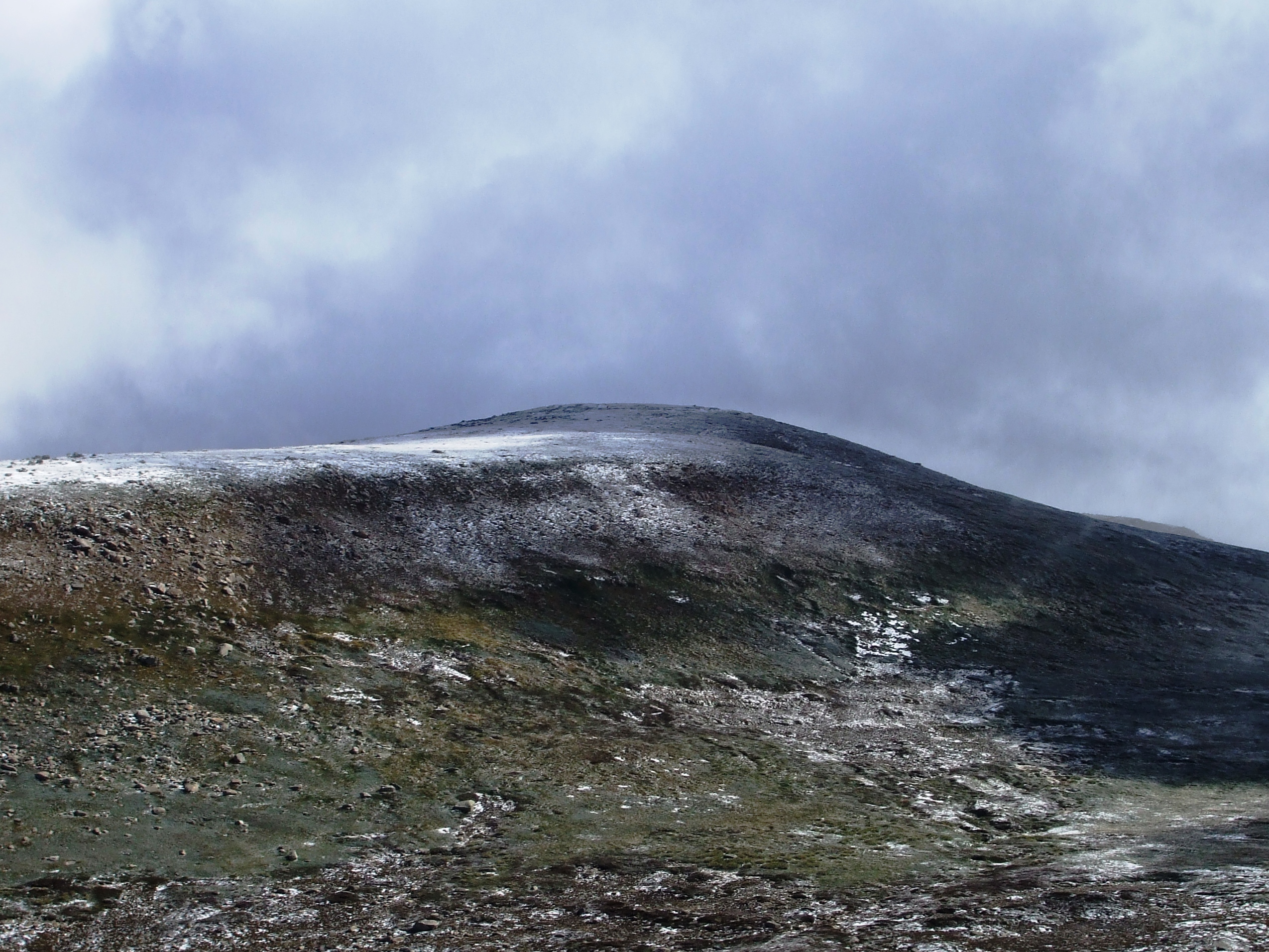
Mount Kosciuszko.

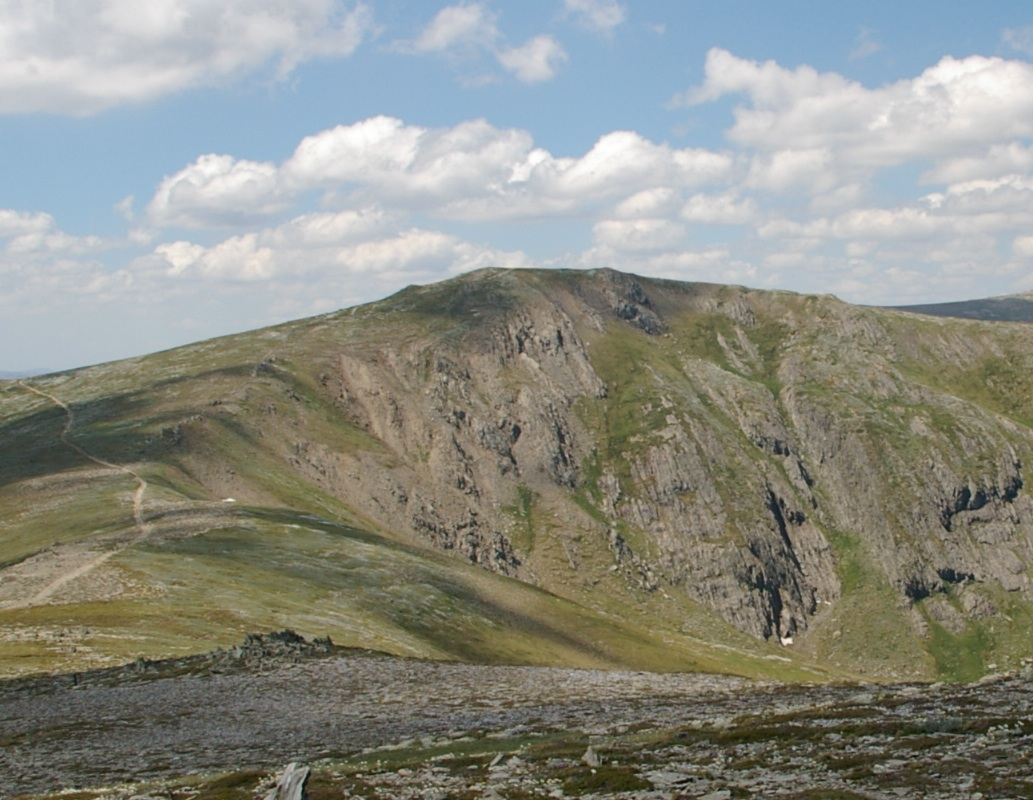
Carruthers Peak on the Main Range.

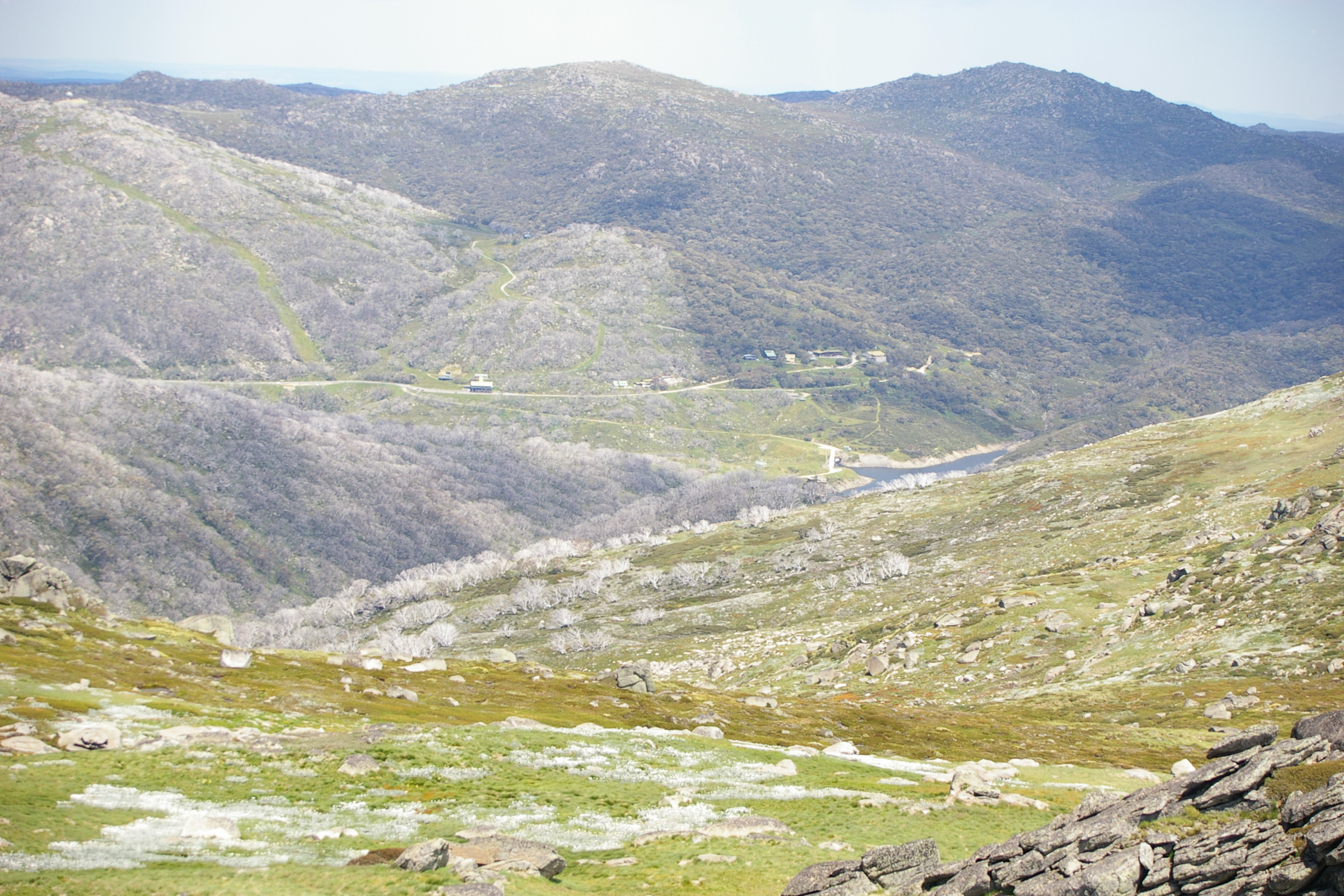
The view from Mount Tate, looking towards Guthega.

- Mountains located within the Snowy Mountains in New South Wales
  - Mount Kosciuszko, at 2,228 metres (7,310 ft) (Highest mountain on the mainland)
  - Mount Townsend, at 2,209 metres (7,247 ft) (Second highest mountain on the mainland)
  - Mount Twynam, at 2,196 metres (7,205 ft) (Third highest)
  - Rams Head, at 2,190 metres (7,190 ft) (Fourth highest)
  - Unnamed peak on Etheridge Ridge, at 2,180 metres (7,150 ft) (Fifth highest)
  - Rams Head North, at 2,177 metres (7,142 ft) (Sixth highest)
  - Alice Rawson Peak, at 2,160 metres (7,090 ft) (Seventh highest)
  - Byatts Camp, at 2,159 metres (7,083 ft) (Eighth highest)
  - Carruthers Peak, at 2,145 metres (7,037 ft) (Equal ninth highest)
  - Abbott Peak, at 2,145 metres (7,037 ft) (Equal ninth highest)
  - Mount Northcote, at 2,131 metres (6,991 ft) (Eleventh highest)
  - Muellers Peak, at 2,120 metres (6,960 ft)
  - Watsons Crags, at 2,020 metres (6,630 ft)
  - Little Twynam, at 2,120 metres (6,960 ft)
  - Mount Clark, at 2,100 metres (6,900 ft)
  - Mount Lee, at 2,100 metres (6,900 ft)
  - Gungartan, at 2,068 metres (6,785 ft) (Equal eighteenth highest)
  - Mount Tate, at 2,068 metres (6,785 ft) (Equal eighteenth highest)
  - Mount Jagungal, at 2,061 metres (6,762 ft) (Twentieth highest)
  - Mount Perisher, at 2,054 metres (6,739 ft)
  - Mount Stilwell, at 2,040 metres (6,690 ft)
  - Back Perisher Mountain, at 2,014 metres (6,608 ft)
  - Mount Anton, at 2,000 metres (6,600 ft)
  - Mount Anderson, at 1,997 metres (6,552 ft)
  - Blue Cow Mountain, at 1,994 metres (6,542 ft)
  - The Granite Peaks, at 1,980 metres (6,500 ft)
  - Dicky Cooper Bogong, at 1,980 metres (6,500 ft)
  - Gills Knobs, at 1,940 metres (6,360 ft)
  - Guthega Peak, at 1,924 metres (6,312 ft)
  - Blue Calf Mountain, at 1,905 metres (6,250 ft)
  - Mount Sentinel, at 1,900 metres (6,200 ft)
  - Mount Piper, at 1,830 metres (6,000 ft)

=== Sugarloaf Range ===
- Mountains located within the Sugarloaf Range
  - Mount Sugarloaf, at 412 metres (1,352 ft)

=== Tweed Range ===
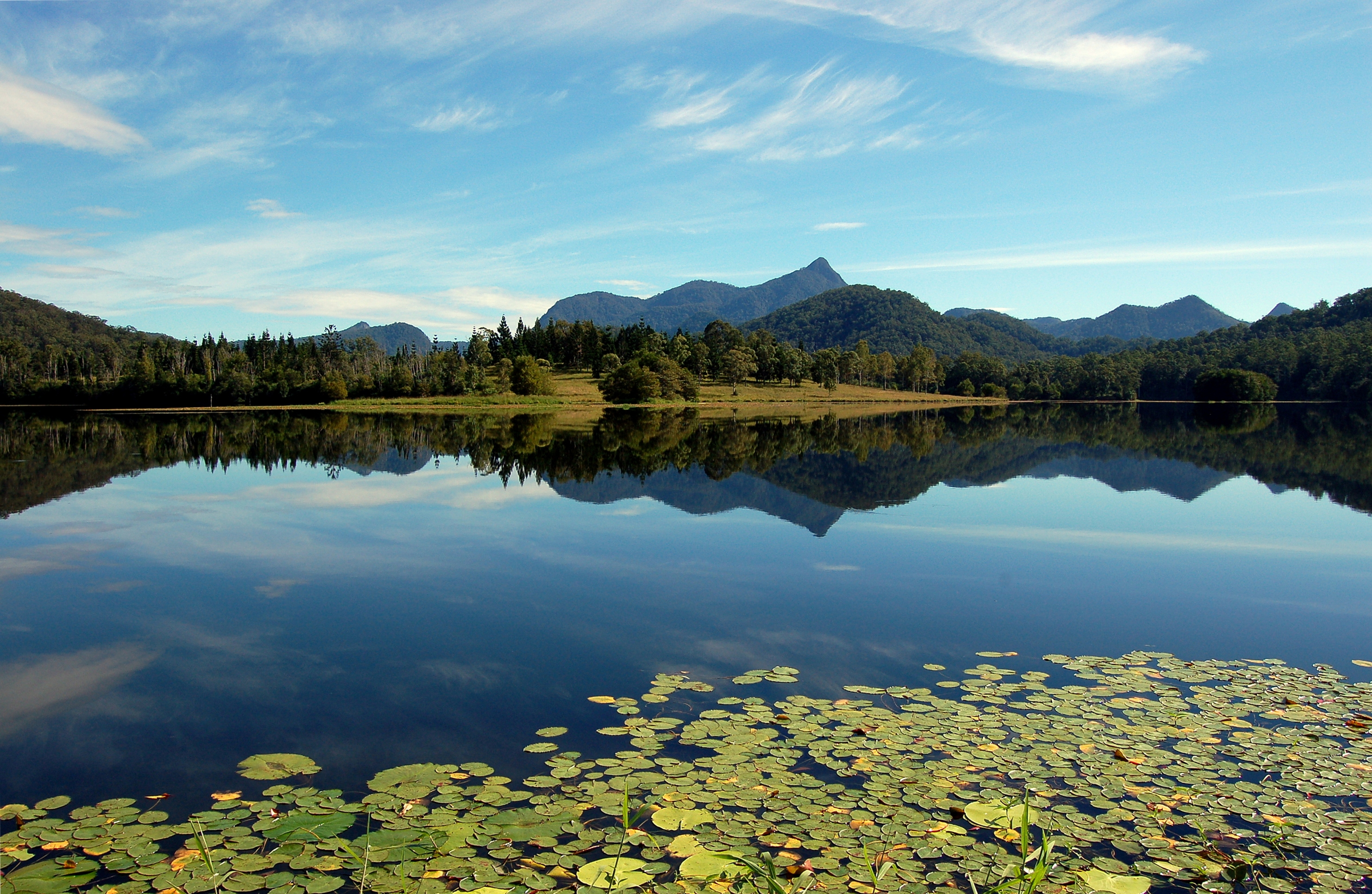
Mount Warning and Clarrie Hall Dam

- Mountains located within the Tweed Range
  - Mount Warning, at 1,156 metres (3,793 ft)
  - Bar Mountain, at 1,130 metres (3,710 ft)
  - Glenugie Peak, at 316 metres (1,037 ft)
  - Mount Gladstone
  - Mount Goobergooberyam
  - Mount Moombil
  - Dome Mountain, Kyogle

=== Warrumbungles ===
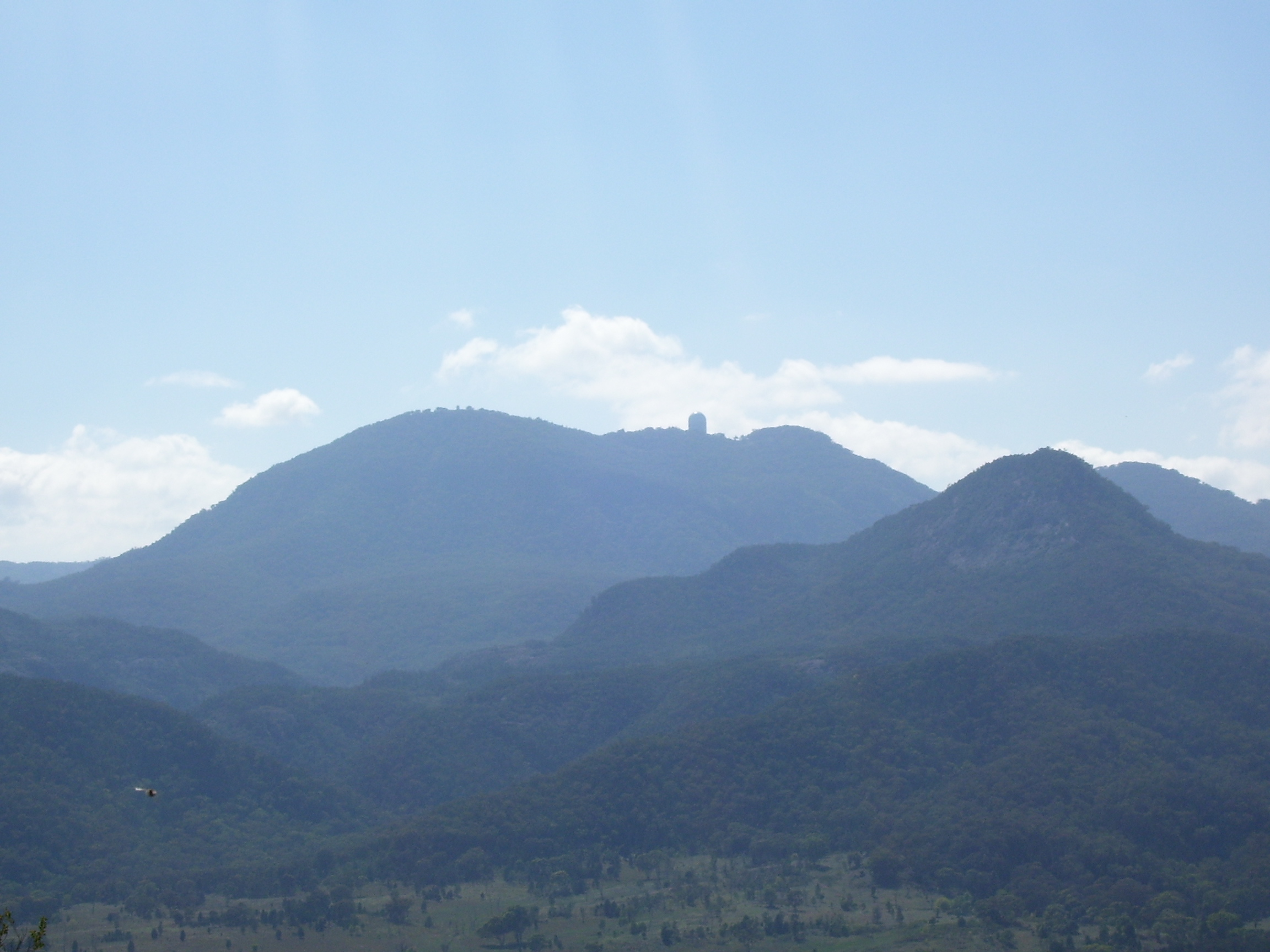
Siding Spring Observatory on Siding Spring Mountain

- Mountains located within the Warrumbungles
  - Mount Exmouth, at 1206m
  - Siding Spring Mountain, at 1,165 metres (3,822 ft)
  - Wedding Cake Mountain, at 1,025 metres (3,363 ft)

=== Other mountains ===
- Mountains located within New South Wales, but not within a specific mountain range
  - Mount Gibraltar, at 863 metres (2,831 ft)
  - Mount Chincogan at 309 m (1,014 ft)
  - Mount Clayton, at 378 metres (1,240 ft)
  - Mount Alexandra
  - Mount Jellore
  - Ninety Acre Hill
  - Mount Gulaga, at 806 metres (2,644 ft)
  - Mount Oxley, at 307 metres (1,007 ft)
  - Mount Tilga, at 329 metres (1,079 ft)
  - Mount Ulandra, at 761 metres (2,497 ft)

== Northern Territory ==
Order	Highest peak	Range / nature reserve	Elevation AHD		Image	Notes
Order	Highest peak	Range / nature reserve	m	ft	Image	Notes
1	Mount Zeil	MacDonnell Ranges	1,531	5,023		
2	Mount Giles	MacDonnell Ranges	1,389	4,557		
3	Mount Sonder	MacDonnell Ranges	1,380	4,530		
4	Mount Liebig	MacDonnell Ranges	1,274	4,180		
5	Mount Palmer	Hart Range	1,117	3,665		
6	Karrinyarra (Central Mount Wedge)	Stuart Bluff Range	1,095	3,593		
7	Kata Tjuta/Mount Olga	Uluṟu-Kata Tjuṯa National Park	1,066	3,497		
8	Uluru	Uluṟu-Kata Tjuṯa National Park	863	2,831		
9	Mount Conner		859	2,818		
10	Central Mount Stuart	Georgina Basin	846	2,776		
11	Chambers Pillar	Chambers Pillar Historical Reserve				
12	Mount Hermannsburg	Krichauff Range				

== Queensland ==
=== South East Queensland ===
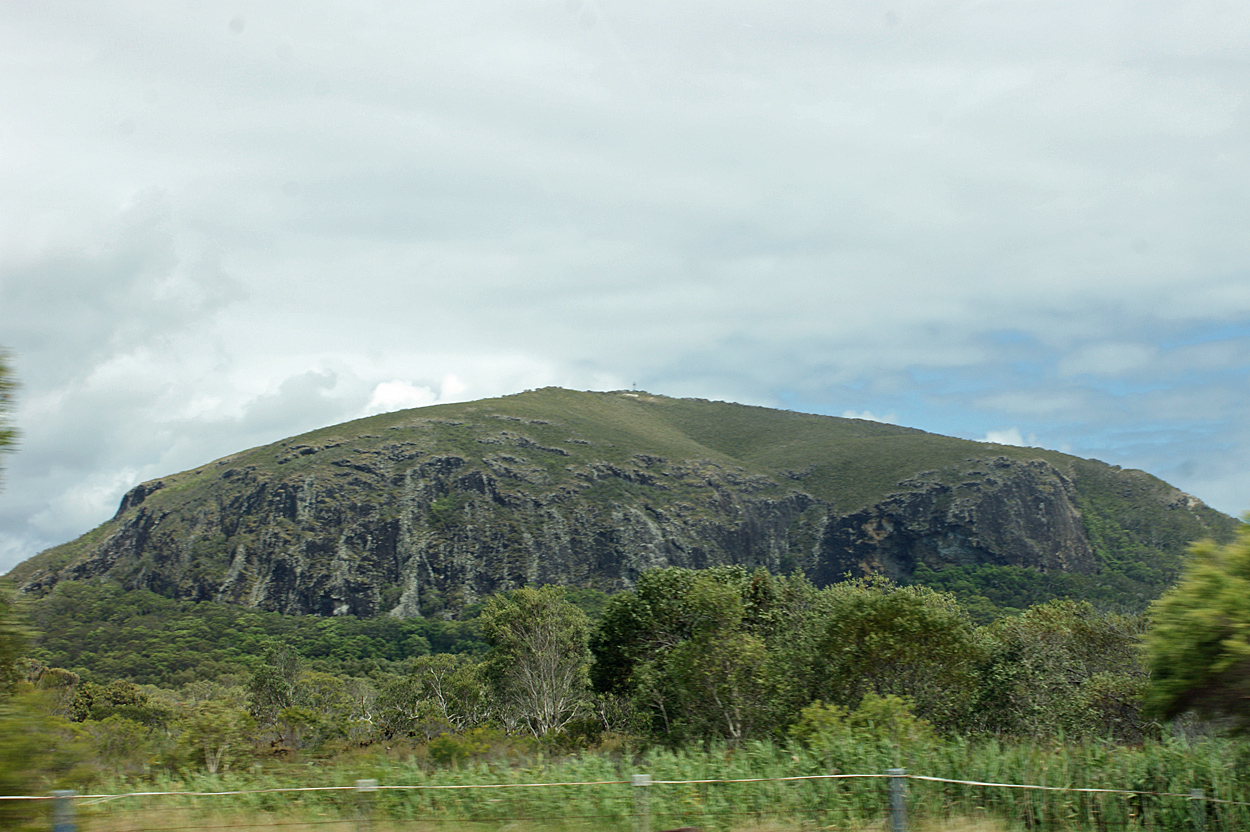
Mount Coolum

- Black Mountain, Queensland
- Camp Mountain
- Cooroy Mountain
- Mount Coolum (208m)
- Mount Cooroora (439m)
- Mount Cotton
- Mount Crosby
- Mount Doongul
- Mount Gravatt
- Mount Ninderry
- Mount Petrie
- Whites Hill (120m)
- Darlington Range
  - Pyramid Rock (678m)
  - Laheys Tabletop (663m)
  - Tamborine Mountain (578m)
  - Mount Wongwallan (377m)
  - Davis Hill (298m)
  - Mount Stapylton (152m)
- Flinders Peak Group
  - Flinders Peak / Aboriginal: Booroongapah (680m)
  - Mount Joyce (469m)
  - Mount Blaine (455m)
  - Mount Goolman (453m)
  - Mount Elliot (437m)
  - Spring Mountain (355m)
- D'Aguilar Range
  - Tenison Woods Mountain (770m)
  - The Summit (765m)
  - Mount D'Aguilar (745m)
  - Mount Samson (690m)
  - Northbrook (659m)
  - Mount Glorious (619m)
  - Mount Nebo (617)
  - Mount Byron (617m)
  - Mount Jim Sue (610m)
  - The Bulls Knob (563m)
  - Mount O'Reilly (526m)
  - Mount Archer (526m)
  - Mount Pleasant (525m)
  - Neurum Mountain (507m)
  - Mount Mee (498m)
  - Mount Lawson (414m)
  - Camp Mountain (414m)
  - Mermaid Mountain (396m)
- Taylor Range
  - Mount Coot-tha (287m)
  - Enoggera Hill (283m)
  - Constitution Hill (263m)
  - Mount Coot-Tha (226m)
- Teviot Range
  - Mount Moon / Aboriginal: Kibbobum (786m)
  - Mount Alford (521m)
- Moogerah Peaks
  - Mount French / Aboriginal: Bunjurgen (579m)
  - Mount Edwards (630 m)
  - Mount Greville / Aboriginal: Meebatboogan (772m)
  - Mount Moon / Aboriginal: Kibbobum (786m)
  - Minto Crags, / Aboriginal: Whinpullin' (331 m)
- McPherson Range

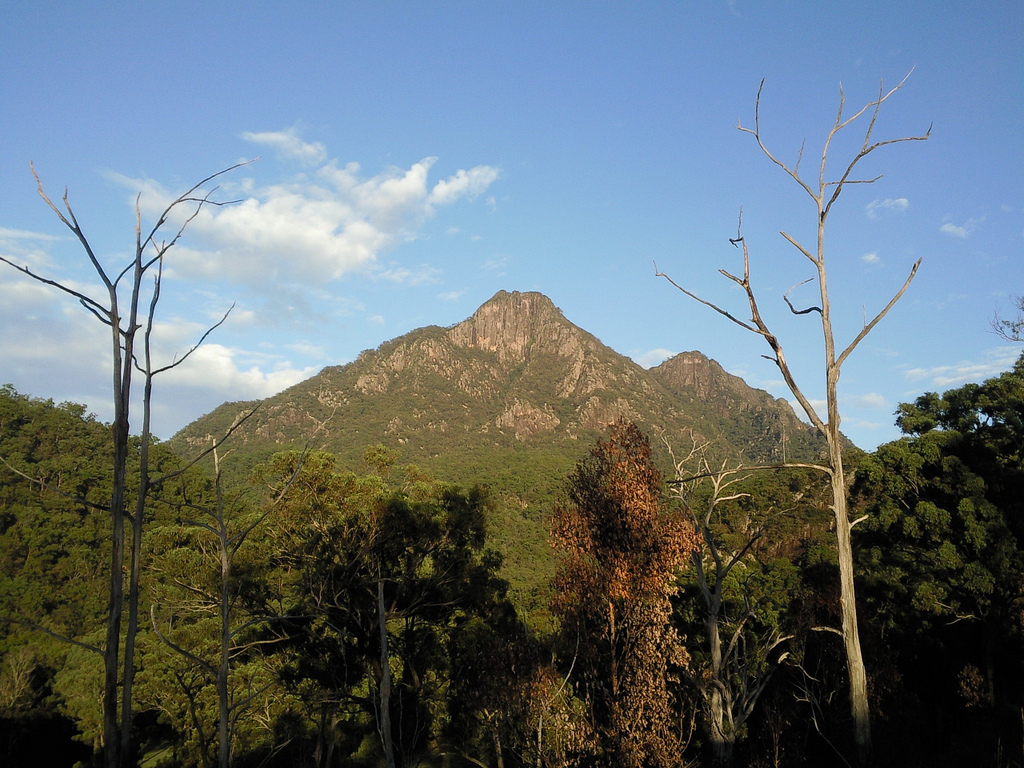
Mount Barney

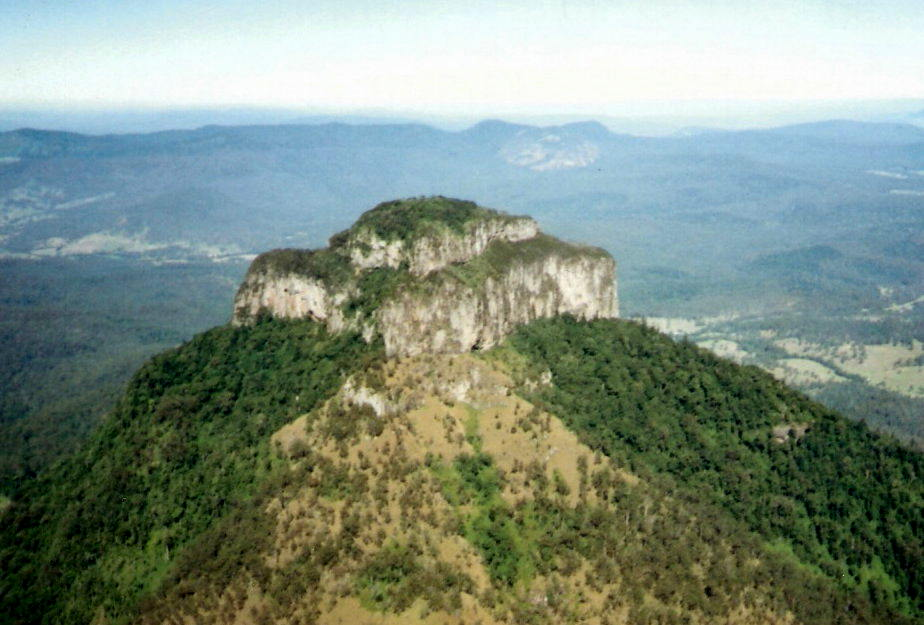
Mount Lindesay

  - Mount Barney (1,358 m)
  - Mount Ballow / Aboriginal: Wahlmoorum (1,313 m)
  - Double Peak (1250 m)
  - Bithongabel (1199 m)
  - Mount Toolona (1190 m)
  - Mount Wanungara (1189 m)
  - Mount Lindesay (1,175 m)
  - Mount Hobwee (1164 m)
  - Mount Throakban (1156 m)
  - Mount Clunie / Aboriginal: Mormgurra (1,155 m)
  - Mount Worendo (1153 m)
  - Mount Merino (1148 m)
  - Point Lookout (1091 m)
  - Cominan (1059 m)
  - Mount Maroon (966 m)
  - Mount Ernest (964 m)
  - Springbrook Mountain (948 m)
  - Mount Westray (887 m)
  - Mount May (836 m)
  - Mount Cougal (West Peak) (724 m)
- Main Range
  - Mount Superbus (1,372 m)
  - Mount Roberts (1,327 m)
  - Wilsons Peak / Aboriginal: Jirramen (1,229 m)
  - Mount Asplenium (1,292 m)
  - Mount Huntley (1,262 m)
  - Panorama Point (1,255 m)
  - Spicers Peak / Aboriginal: Binkinjoora (1222 m)
  - Mount Steamer (1,215 m)
  - Lizard Point (1,200 m)
  - Mount Mitchell / Aboriginal: Cooyinnirra (1,175 m)
  - Sentinel Point (1,175 m)
  - Bare Rock (1,168 m)
  - Double Top (1,150 m)
  - Mount Cordeaux / Aboriginal: Niamboyoo (1,144 m)

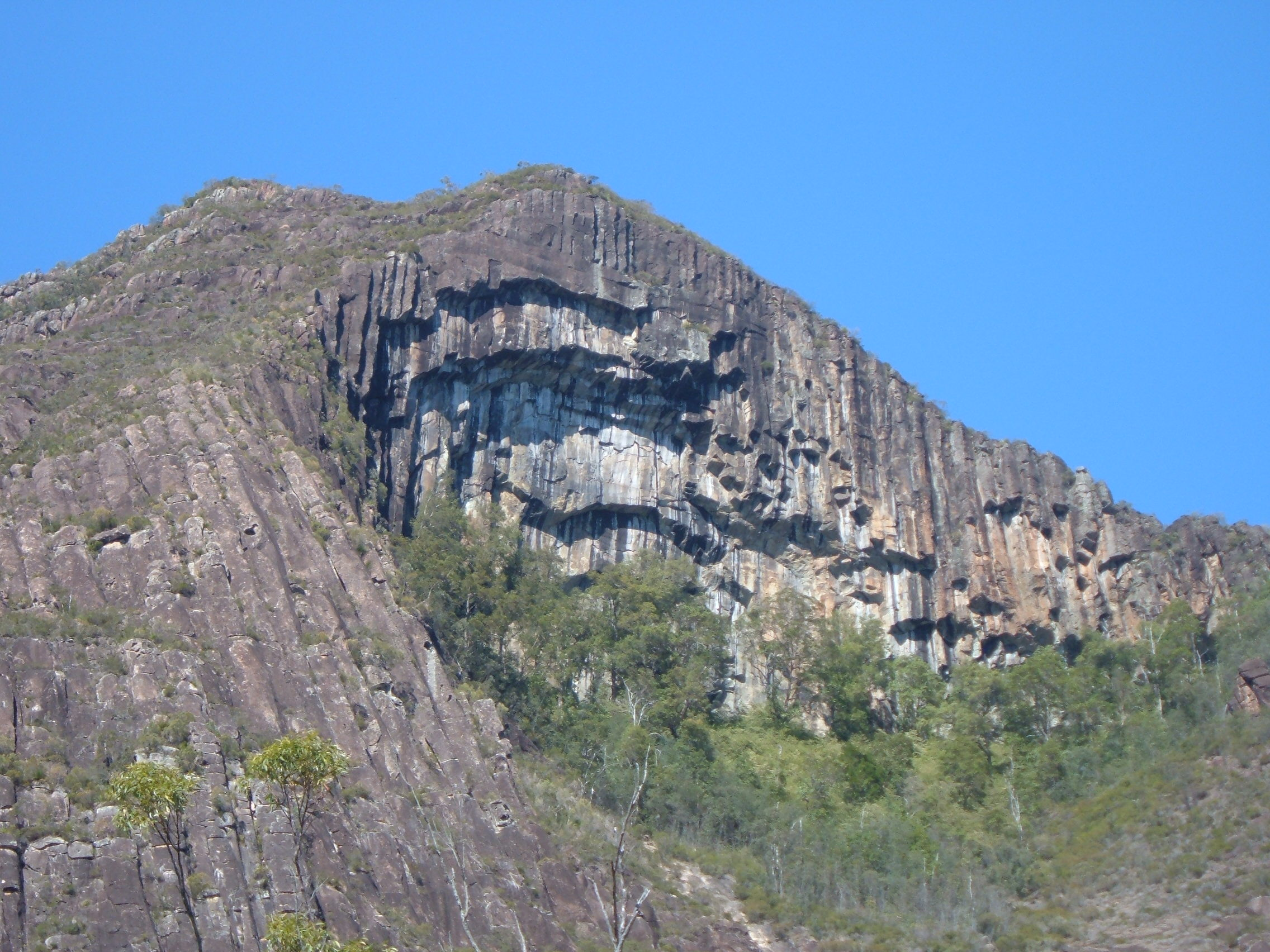
Mount Beerwah

- Glass House Mountains
  - Mount Beerburrum, (276 m)
  - Mount Beerwah, (555 m)
  - Mount Coochin, (235 m)
  - Mount Cooee, (177 m)
  - Mount Coonowrin or Crookneck, (377 m)
  - Mount Elimbah, (129 m)
  - Mount Miketeebumulgrai, (202 m)
  - Mount Ngungun, (253 m)
  - Mount Tibberoowuccum, (220 m)
  - Mount Tibrogargan, (364 m)
  - Mount Tunbubudla or the Twins, (322 and 296 m)
  - Wild Horse Mountain, (123 m)
  - The Saddleback, (125 m)
  - Round Mountain, (97 m)
- Northern Tablelands
  - Mount Norman (1,267 m)
  - First Pyramid
  - Second Pyramid
  - Bald Rock
  - South Bald Rock
- Blackall Range
- Carnarvon Range
  - Consuelo Peak (1174m)
  - Mount Sugarloaf (1154m)
  - Mount Percy (1151m)
  - Mount Rugged (1130m)
- Conondale Range
  - Mount Langley (868m)
  - Mount Ramsden (800m)
  - Mount Gerald (800m)
  - Summer Mountain (786m)
- Mistake Mountains
  - Mount Mistake (998m)
  - Mount Haldon (906m)
  - Point Pure (892m)
  - Mount Zahel (880m)
  - Mount William (843m)
- Little Liverpool Range
  - Mount Castle (969m)
  - Kangaroo Mountain (755m)
  - Grass Tree Knob (751m)
  - The Pinnacle (901m)
  - Mount Beau Brummell (701m)
  - Mount Grandchester (347m)

=== Central and North Queensland ===
- Mount Archer (604m)
- Mount Blackwood
- Mount Bowen (1,121m) High point Hinchinbrook Island
- Mount Cook (493m) High point Magnetic Island
- Mount Dalrymple (1,259m)
- Mount Elliot (1,234m)
- Mount Emerald
- Mount Fisher (1,385m) Millaa Millaa
- Mount Inkerman
- Mount Jim Crow
- Mount Larcom
- Mount Mort
- Mount Mulligan (Ngarrabullgan)
- Mount Myrtle
- Mount Pieter Botte
- Mount Tempest
- Thornton Peak (1,374m)
- Walshs Pyramid
- Mount Warrumbullen
- Mount Westall
- Mount Wheeler (365m)

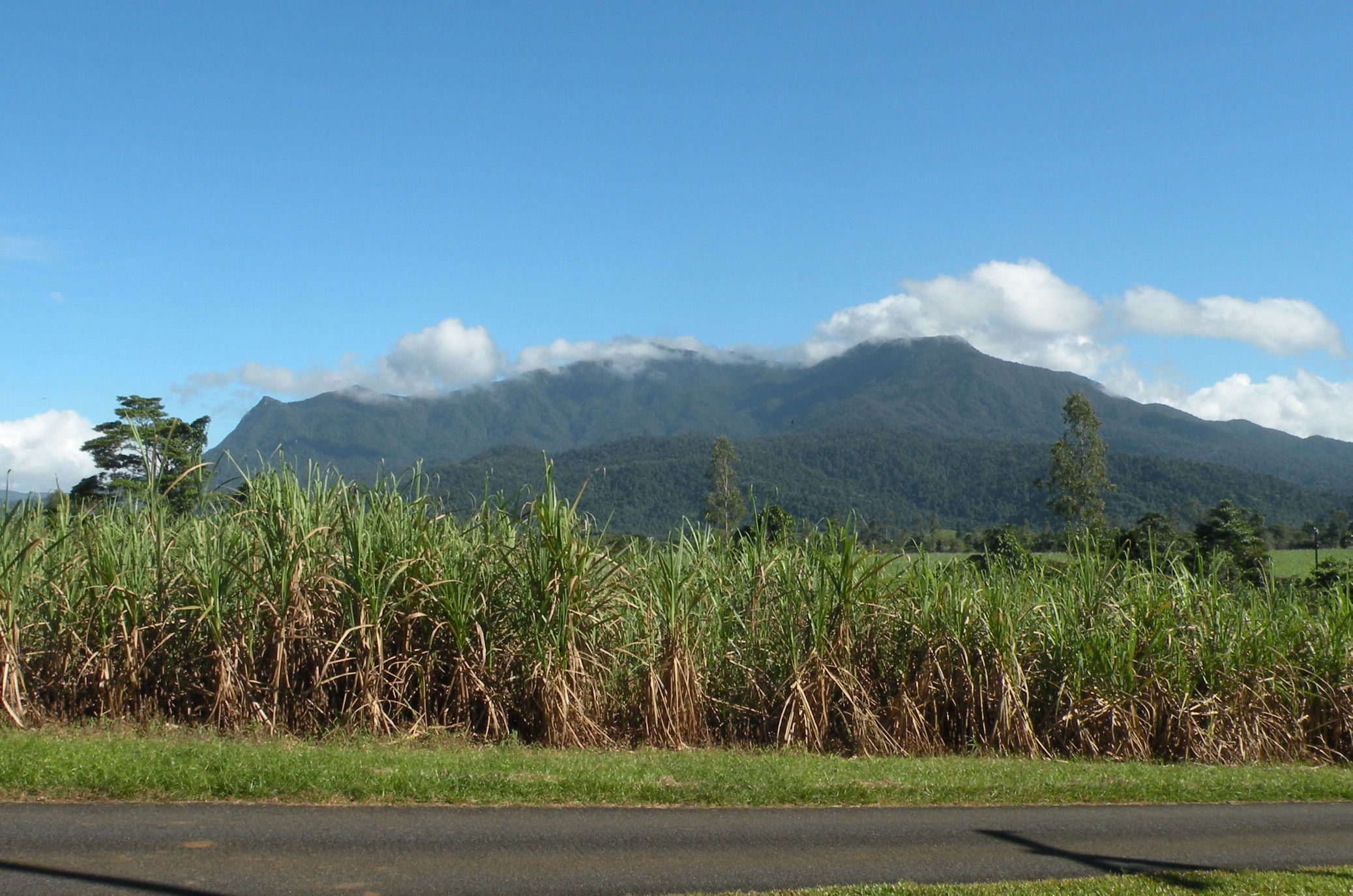
Mount Bartle Frere

- Bellenden Ker Range
  - Mount Bartle Frere (1,622 m) (Highest
    mountain in Queensland)
  - Mount Bellenden Ker (1,593 m)
- Lamb Range
  - Lambs Head (Kahlpahlim Rock)
- Basilisk Range
  - Mount Tyson
  - Mount Mackay
- Cardwell Range
- Hervey Range

=== Darling Downs ===
- Bunya Mountains
  - Mount Kiangarow (1154m)
  - Mount Mowbullan (1104m)
  - Haly Mountain (957m)
  - The Pinnacle (901m)
- Mount Marlay

== South Australia ==
=== Eyre Peninsula ===
- Eyre Peninsula
  - Mount Hill at 450 metres (1,480 ft)
  - Darke Peak at 477 metres (1,565 ft)

=== Flinders Ranges ===
- Flinders Ranges
  - St Mary Peak (Ngarri Mudlanha), at 1,169 metres (3,835 ft)
  - Pompeys Pillar, at 1,168 metres (3,832 ft)
  - Point Bonney, at 1,158 metres (3,799 ft)
  - Beatrice Hill (Wilkalanha), at 1,148 metres (3,766 ft)
  - Mount Aleck (Urdlu-warlpunha), at 1,095 metres (3,593 ft)
  - Mount Hack, at 1,086 metres (3,563 ft)
  - Mount Tilley, at 1,018 metres (3,340 ft)
  - Patawarta Hill, at 1,015 metres (3,330 ft)
  - Mount Boorong
  - Mount Karawarra
  - Harold Hill
  - Beacon Hill, at 1,003 metres (3,291 ft)
  - Rawnsley Bluff, at 950 metres (3,120 ft)
  - Mount Brown, at 970 metres (3,180 ft)
  - Mount Remarkable, at 960 metres (3,150 ft)
  - Mount Caernarvon, at 921 metres (3,022 ft)
  - Mount Hayward, at 865 metres (2,838 ft)
  - Mount Arden, at 844 metres (2,769 ft)
  - The Dutchmans Stern, at 820 metres (2,690 ft)
  - Moockra Tower, at 758 metres (2,487 ft)
  - Devils Peak, at 675 metres (2,215 ft)
  - Wonoka Hill, at 630 metres (2,070 ft)
  - Mount Chambers, at 409 metres (1,342 ft)

=== Gammon Ranges ===
- Gammon Ranges
  - Benbonyathe Hill, at 1,064 metres (3,491 ft)
  - Mount McKinlay (Wayanha), at 1,050 metres (3,440 ft)
  - Gammon Hill, at 1,012 metres (3,320 ft)
  - Freeling Heights, at 944 metres (3,097 ft)
  - Mount Serle, at 912 metres (2,992 ft)
  - Mount Rowe, at 900 metres (3,000 ft)
  - Mount John Roberts, at 880 metres (2,890 ft)
  - Cleft Peak, at 850 metres (2,790 ft)
  - Mount Painter, at 765 metres (2,510 ft)
  - The Armchair, at 700 metres (2,300 ft)

=== Gawler Ranges ===
- Gawler Ranges
  - Paney Bluff, at 436 metres (1,430 ft)
  - Mount Wudinna, at 260 metres (850 ft)

=== Mount Lofty Ranges ===
- Mount Lofty Ranges
  - Mount Bryan, at 936 metres (3,071 ft)
  - Mount Lofty, at 720 metres (2,360 ft)
  - New Campbell Hill, at 710 metres (2,330 ft)
  - Mount Bonython, at 700 metres (2,300 ft)
  - Kaiserstuhl, at 600 metres (2,000 ft)
  - Mount Crawford, at 560 metres (1,840 ft)
  - Mount Misery, at 560 metres (1,840 ft)
  - Mount Barker, at 520 metres (1,710 ft)
  - Peters Hill, at 518 metres (1,699 ft)

=== Musgrave Ranges ===
- Musgrave Ranges
  - Mount Woodroffe, at 1,435 metres (4,708 ft) (highest peak in SA)
  - Mount Charles, at 1,332 metres (4,370 ft)
  - Mount Morris, at 1,285 metres (4,216 ft)
  - Mount Whinham, at 1,228 metres (4,029 ft)
  - Mount Berry, at 1,227 metres (4,026 ft)
  - Mount Woodward, at 1,224 metres (4,016 ft)
  - Mount Edwin, at 1,193 metres (3,914 ft)
  - Mount Spec (Kali-Kalinya), at 1,186 metres (3,891 ft)
  - Mount Davenport, at 1,135 metres (3,724 ft)
  - Mount Everard (Uwalinyi), at 1,083 metres (3,553 ft)
  - Mount Kintore, at 1,066 metres (3,497 ft)
  - McNamara Hill (Marnilytjanya), at 1,064 metres (3,491 ft)
  - Mount Hardy, at 1,061 metres (3,481 ft)
  - Mount Davies, at 1,053 metres (3,455 ft)
  - Ayliffe Hill (Altjinytjanya), at 1,041 metres (3,415 ft)
  - Mount Caroline (Ulkiyanya), at 1,039 metres (3,409 ft)
  - Mount Cuthbert (Atarkanya), at 1,030 metres (3,380 ft)
  - Mount Cooparinna, at 1,014 metres (3,327 ft)
  - Dulgunja Hill, at 1,009 metres (3,310 ft)
  - Gosse Pile, at 1,002 metres (3,287 ft)

== Tasmania ==
Order	Highest peak	Range / nature reserve	Elevation AHD		Image	Notes
Order	Highest peak	Range / nature reserve	m	ft	Image	Notes
1	Mount Ossa	Du Cane	1,617	5,305		
2	Legges Tor	Ben Lomond	1,572	5,157		
3	Giblin Peak	Ben Lomond	1,569	5,148		
4	Mount Pelion West	Pelion	1,560	5,118		
5	Barn Bluff	Cradle Cirque - Bluff Cirque	1,559	5,115		
6	Cradle Mountain	Cradle Cirque - Bluff Cirque	1,545	5,069		
7	Markham Heights	Ben Lomond	1,542	5,059		
8	Hamilton Crags	Ben Lomond	1,540	5,052		
9	Smithies Peak		1,527	5,010		
9	Stacks Bluff	Ben Lomond	1,527	5,010		
11	unnamed peak	Du Cane	1,520	4,987		
12	Mount Geryon North	Du Cane	1,516	4,974		
13	Mount Massif	Du Cane	1,514	4,967		
14	Misery Bluff	Ben Lomond	1,510	4,954		
15	Mount Geryon South	Du Cane	1,509	4,951		
15	King Davids Peak		1,509	4,951		
17	Ossian’s Throne	Ben Lomond	1,498	4,915		
17	Coalmine Crag	Ben Lomond	1,498	4,915		
19	Mount Gould	Du Cane	1,485	4,872		
20	Castle Crag	Du Cane	1,482	4,862		
20	Mount Thetis	Du Cane	1,482	4,862		
22	The Acropolis	Du Cane	1,481	4,859		
23	Mount Hyperion		1,480	4,856		
24	Magnet Crag	Ben Lomond	1,464	4,803		
25	Mount Pelion East	Pelion	1,461	4,793		
26	Mount Jerusalem		1,459	4,787		
27	Mount Olympus		1,449	4,754		
27	Cumner Bluff		1,449	4,754		
29	Mount Gell		1,447	4,747		
30	Solomons Throne		1,446	4,744		
30	Frenchmans Cap		1,446	4,744		
32	Ironstone Mountain	Great Western; Tiers	1,443	4,734		
33	Eldon Peak	Eldon Range	1,440	4,724		
34	Mount Field West		1,434	4,705		
35	Mersey Crag	Ben Lomond	1,432	4,698		
36	Walled Mountain		1,431	4,695		
37	Mount Anne		1,425	4,675		
38	Western Bluff		1,420	4,659		
38	Barrow Mountain		1,420	4,659		
40	Mount Rufus		1,416	4,646		
41	Macs Mountain		1,413	4,636		
42	Mount Emmett		1,410	4,626		
43	Fisher Bluff		1,408	4,619		
44	Twin Spires		1,406	4,613		
44	Mount Barrow		1,406	4,613		
46	Mount Hugel		1,403	4,603		
47	Cathedral Mountain	Cathedral	1,387	4,551		
48	Mount Achilles		1,363	4,472		
49	Mount Ragoona		1,350	4,429		
50	Mount Mawson		1,300	4,265		
51	Mount Murchison	West Coast	1,275	4,183		
52	Kunanyi / Mount Wellington	Wellington	1,269	4,163		
53	Hartz Peak	Hartz	1,255	4,117		
53	Mother Cummings; Peak		1,255	4,117		
55	Forty Lake Peak		1,248	4,094		
56	Mount Roland		1,234	4,049		
57	Quamby Bluff		1,228	4,029		
58	Adamsons Peak		1,225	4,019		
59	Federation Peak	Arthur	1,224	4,016		
60	Artillery Knob		1,216	3,990		
61	Mount Victoria		1,207	3,960		
62	Interview Pinnacle		1,200	3,937		
63	Mount Geikie	Tyndall	1,191	3,907		
64	Mount Arthur		1,188	3,898		
65	Mount Tyndall	Tyndall	1,179	3,868		
66	Mount Jukes	West Coast	1,168	3,832		
67	Mount Sedgwick	West Coast	1,147	3,763		
68	Mount Owen	West Coast	1,146	3,760		
69	Mount Sorell	West Coast	1,144	3,753		
70	Mount Dundas	West Coast	1,143	3,750		
71	Mount Read	West Coast	1,123	3,684		
72	Proprietary Peak	West Coast	1,103	3,619		
73	Pyramid Peak	West Coast	1,080	3,543		
73	unnamed peak	Sticht	1,080	3,543		
75	West Jukes Peak	West Coast	1,062	3,484		
76	Mount Darwin	West Coast	1,033	3,389		
77	South Jukes Peak	West Coast	1,014	3,327		
78	Mount Hamilton	West Coast	1,005	3,297		
79	Mount Black	West Coast	950	3,117		
80	Victoria Peak	West Coast	949	3,114		
81	Mount Huxley	West Coast	926	3,038		
82	Mount Lyell	West Coast	917	3,009		
83	Mount Strahan	West Coast	855	2,805		
84	Mount Julia	West Coast	843	2,766		
85	South Darwin Peak	West Coast	780	2,559		
86	Mount Selina	West Coast	760	2,493		
87	Mount Munro	Furneaux	715	2,346		
88	Mount Farrell	West Coast	711	2,333		
89	Mount Hamilton	Macquarie Island	433	1,421		
-	Mount Bischoff					
-	Mount Pleasant					

== Victoria ==
=== Victorian Alps ===
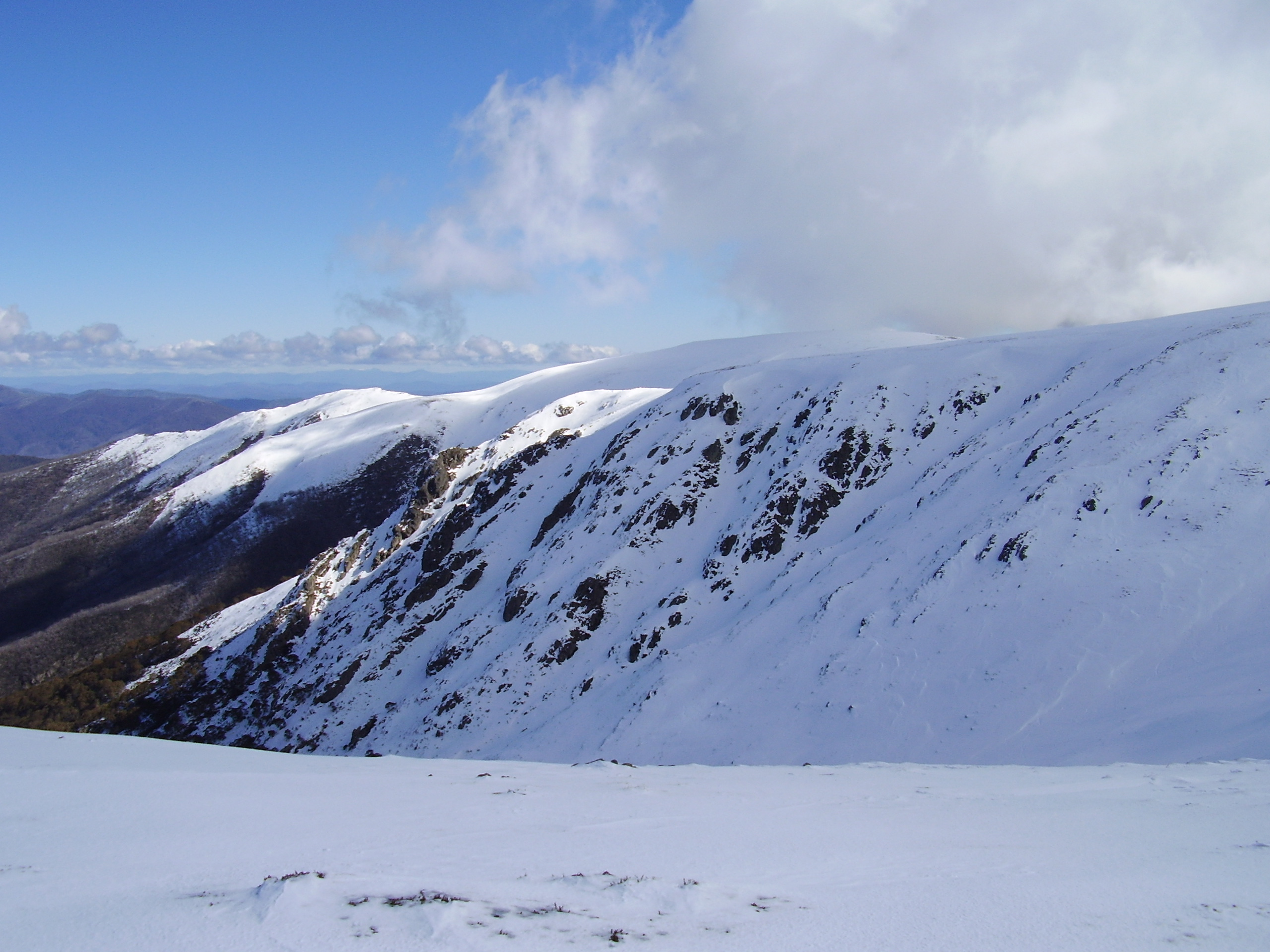
looking to the summit of Mount Bogong, in winter.

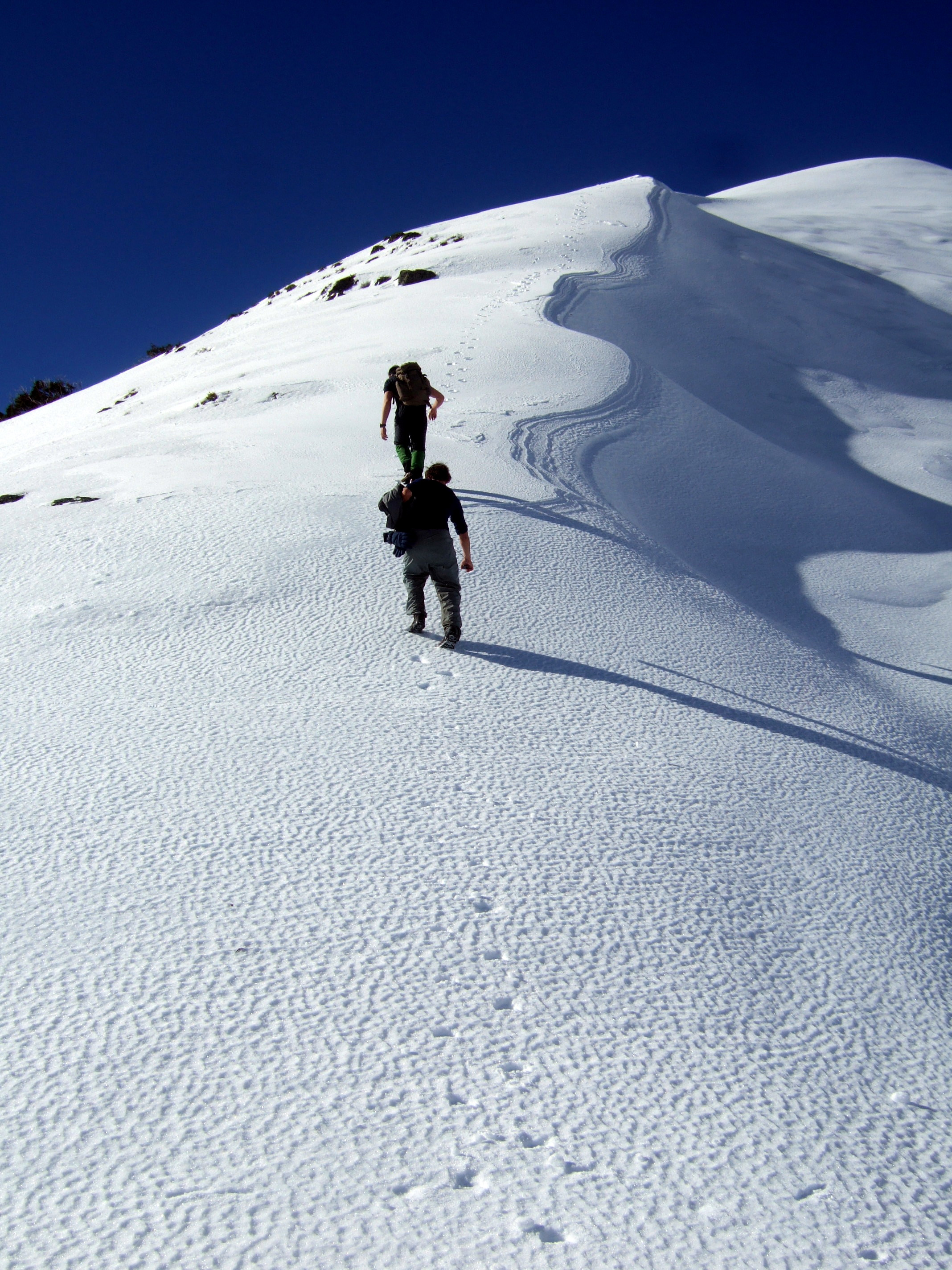
Ascending to the summit of Mount Feathertop, in winter.

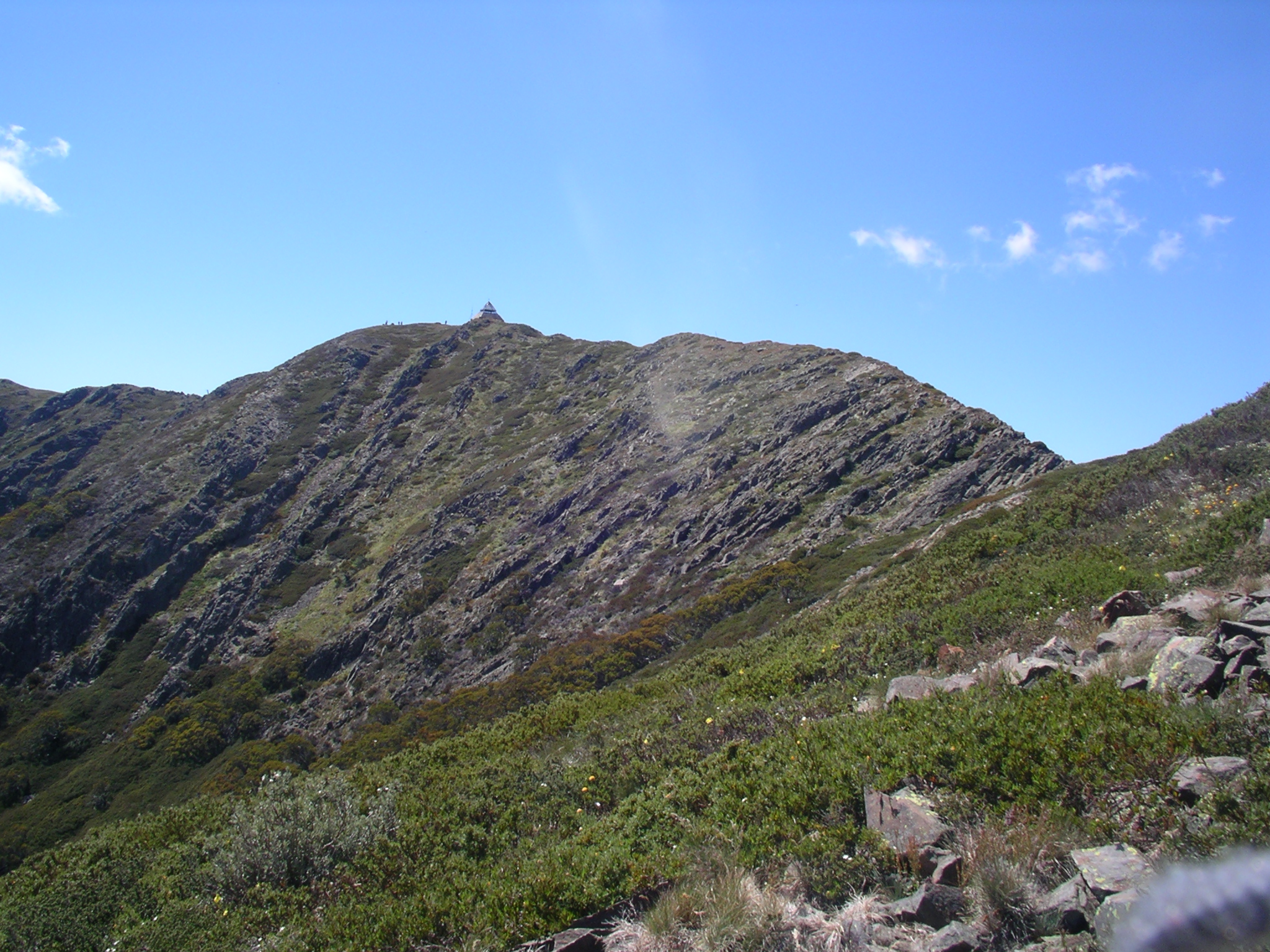
Mount Buller ridge in summer.

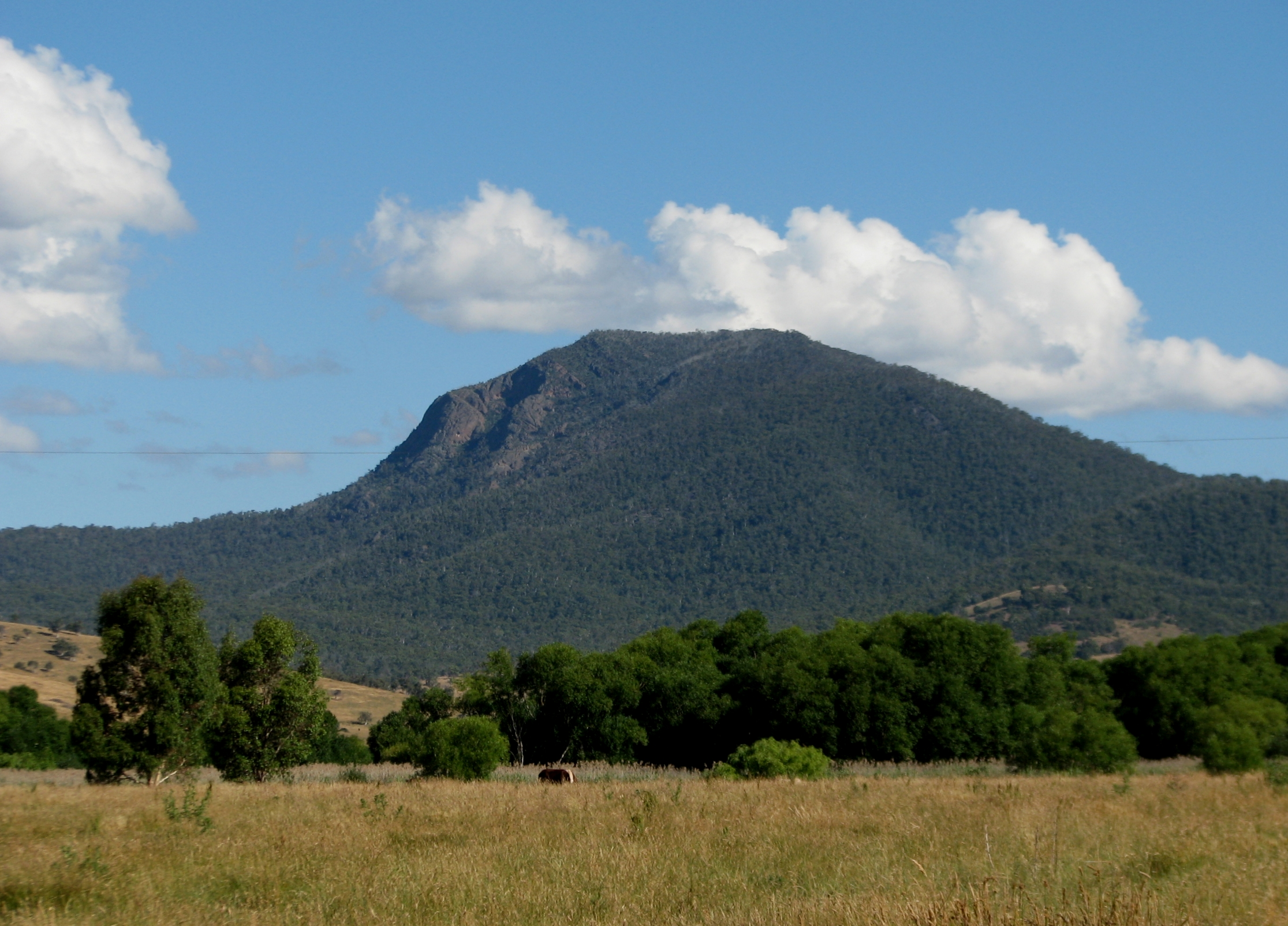
Mount Tambo, in summer.

- Mountains located within the Victorian Alps
  - Mount Bogong (1,986 m or 6,516 ft) (Highest mountain in the state)
  - Mount Feathertop (1,922 m or 6,306 ft) (Second highest mountain in the state)
  - Bogong High Plains
    - Mount Nelse West (1,893 m or 6,211 ft)
    - Mount Loch (1,887 m or 6,191 ft)
    - Mount Nelse North (1,884 m or 6,181 ft)
    - Mount Fainter South (1,883 m or 6,178 ft)
    - Mount Nelse (1,882 m or 6,175 ft)
    - Mount Hotham (1,862 m or 6,109 ft)
    - Mount McKay, at 1,849 metres (6,066 ft)
    - Mount Cope (1,837 m or 6,027 ft)
    - Spion Kopje (1,837 m or 6,027 ft)
    - Mount Jim (1,818 m or 5,965 ft)
  - Cobberas Range
    - Mount Cobberas No. 1 (1,833 m or 6,014 ft)
    - Mount Cobberas No. 2
    - Moscow Peak
    - Middle Peak
    - Cleft Peak
  - Buller-Howitt Region
    - Mount Buller (1,805 m or 5,922 ft)
    - Mount Stirling (1,749 m or 5,738 ft)
    - Mount Howitt (1,742 m or 5,715 ft)
    - Mount Magdala (1,725 m or 5,659 ft)
    - The Bluff (1,725 m or 5,659 ft)
    - King Billy No. 1 (1,716 m or 5,630 ft)
    - King Billy No. 2 (1,696 m or 5,564 ft)
    - Mount Clear (1,695 m or 5,561 ft)
    - Mount Speculation (1,666 m or 5,466 ft)
    - Mount Cobbler (1,628 m or 5,341 ft)
    - Mount McDonald (1,620 m or 5,315 ft)
    - Mount Buggery (Alpine Shire) (1,583–1,598 m or 5,194–5,243 ft)
    - Mount Koonika (1,594 m or 5,230 ft)
    - The Viking (1,519 m or 4,984 ft)
    - Mount Despair (1,460 m or 4,790 ft)
    - Eagles Peaks (1,446 m or 4,744 ft)
  - Moroka-Tarli Karng Region
    - Mount Reynard (1,705 m or 5,594 ft)
    - Mount Wellington (1,634 m or 5,361 ft)
    - Mount Tamboritha (1,509 m or 4,951 ft)
    - Long Hill (1,290 m or 4,232 ft)
    - Mount Ligar (The Crinoline) (1,165 m or 3,822 ft)
  - Cathedral Range
    - The Green Hill (1,241 m or 4,072 ft)
    - Sugarloaf Peak (923 m or 3,028 ft)
    - Cathedral Peak (845 m or 2,772 ft)
  - Mount Wills (1,755 m or 5,758 ft)
  - Mount Porepunkah (1,178 m or 3,865 ft)
  - The Horn at Mount Buffalo (1,723 m or 5,653 ft)
  - Mount Gibbo (1,750 m or 5,741 ft)
  - The Hump at Mount Buffalo (1,695 m or 5,561 ft)
  - Mount Baw Baw (1,567 m or 5,141 ft)
  - Mount Torbreck (1,516 m or 4,974 ft)
  - Mount St Gwinear (1,509 m or 4,951 ft)
  - Mount Benambra (1,480 m or 4,856 ft)
  - Lake Mountain (1,433 m or 4,701 ft)
  - Mount Selma (1,456 m or 4,777 ft)
  - Mount Useful (1,435 m or 4,708 ft)
  - Mount Tambo (1,430 m or 4,692 ft)
    - Little Mount Tambo (1,277 m or 4,190 ft)
  - Mount Selwyn (1,411 m or 4,629 ft)
  - Mount Matlock (1,377 m or 4,518 ft)
  - Mount Terrible (1,325 m or 4,347 ft)
  - Mount Donna Buang (1,250 m or 4,101 ft)
  - Mount Buggery (Wangaratta) (1,153 m or 3,783 ft)
  - Pine Mountain (1,062 m or 3,484 ft)
  - Mount Dom Dom (740 m or 2,428 ft)
  - Brumby Point

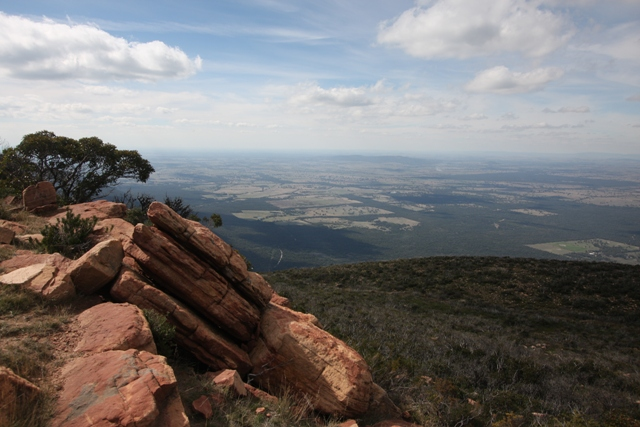
Mount William, looking east towards Ararat.

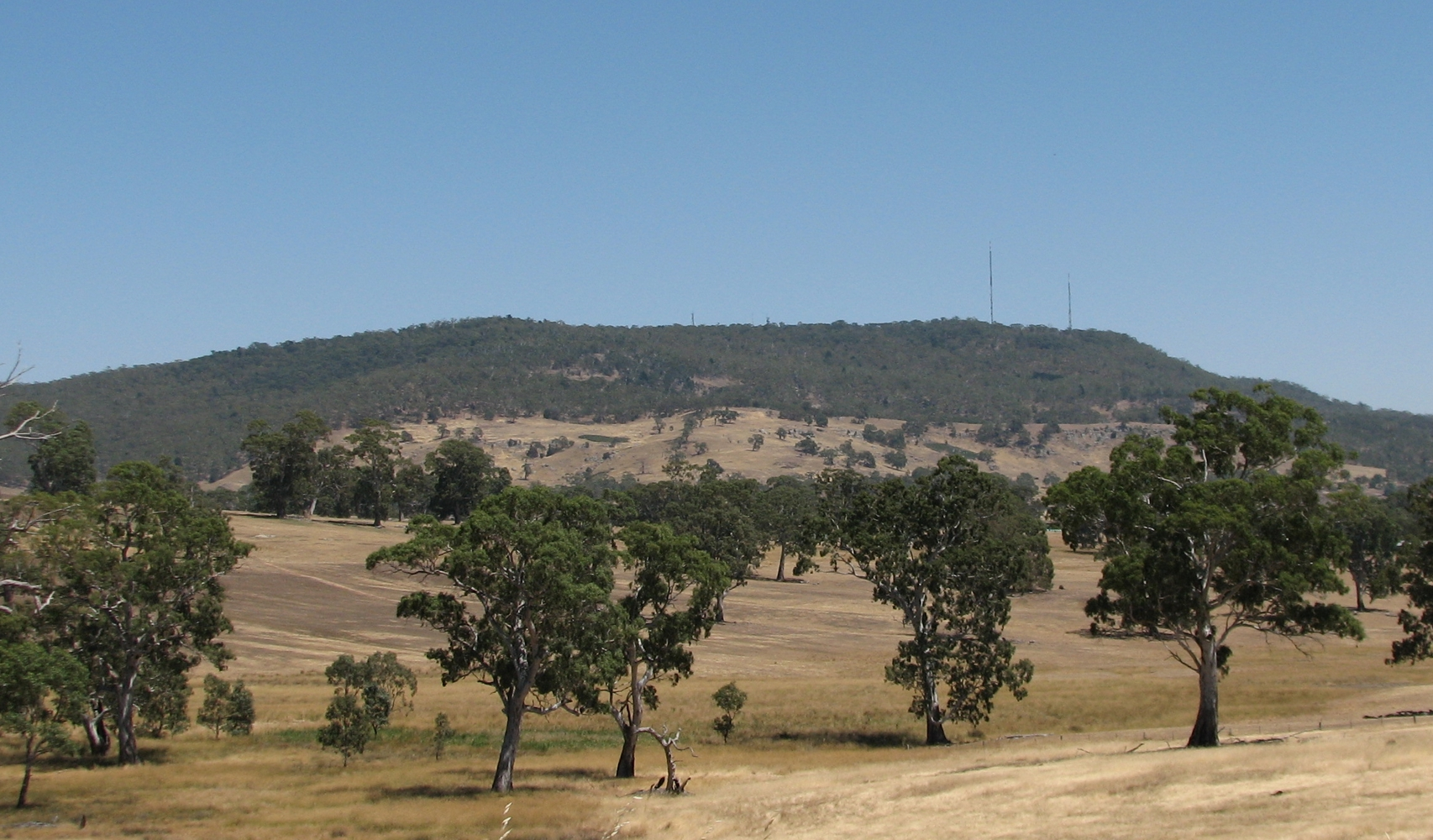
Mount Alexander, in summer.

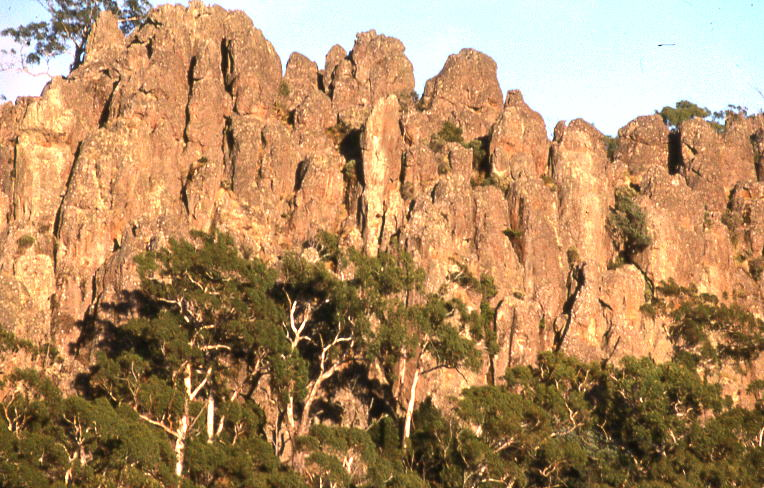
Hanging Rock, in summer.

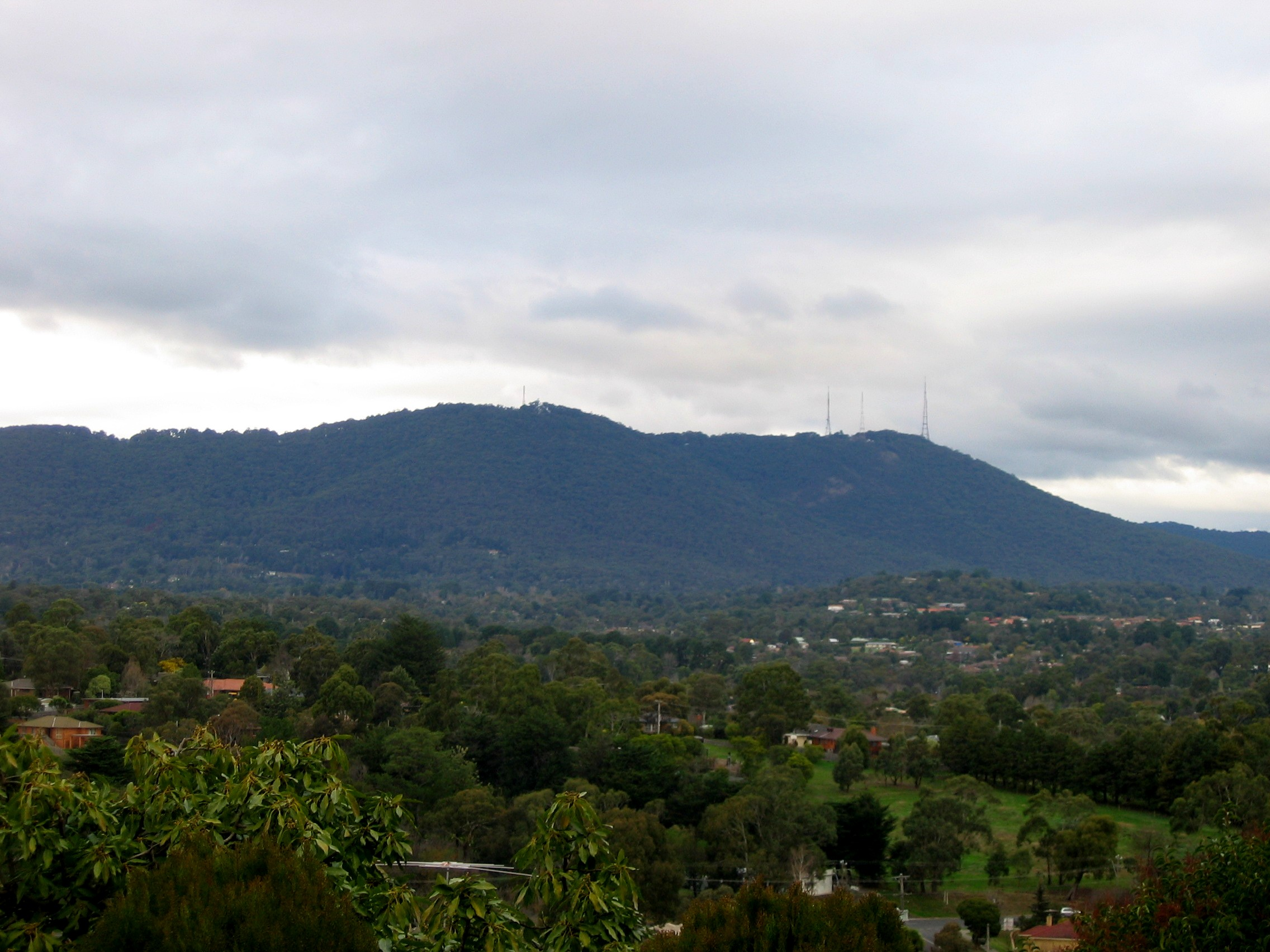
Corhanwarrabul, in winter.

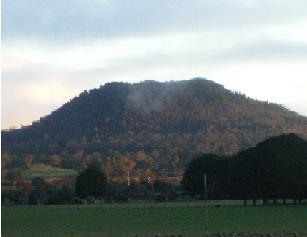
Mount Napier, in summer.

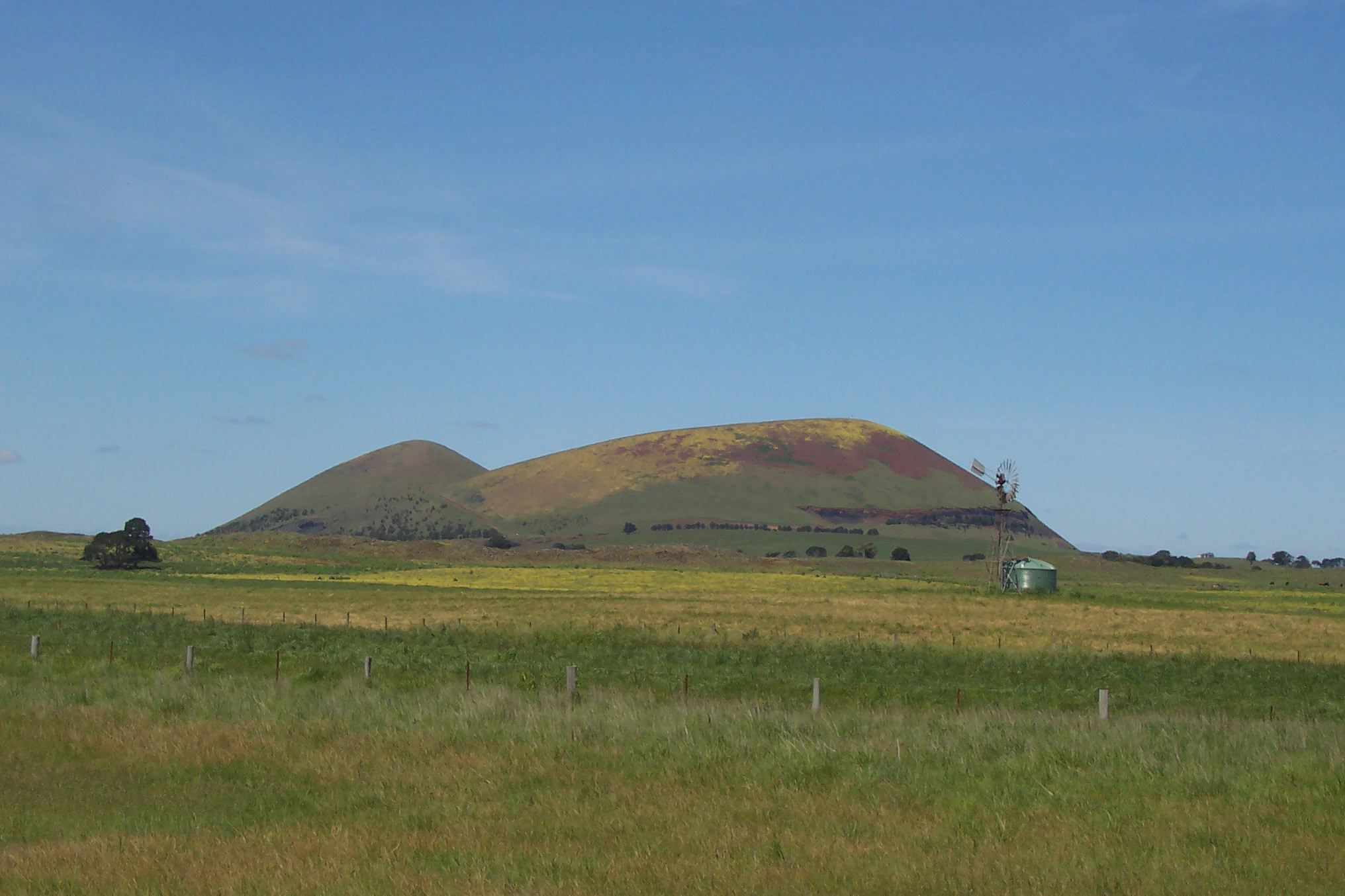
Mount Elephant, in spring.

=== Grampians ===
- Mountains located within the Grampians
  - Mount William (1,167 m or 3,829 ft)
  - Durd-Durd (1,167 m or 3,829 ft)
  - Red Man Bluff (1,017 m or 3,337 ft)
  - Mount Rosea (1,006 m or 3,301 ft)
  - Mount Thackeray (979 m or 3,212 ft)
  - The Fortress (875 m or 2,871 ft)
  - Mount Abrupt (827 m or 2,713 ft)
  - Mount Difficult (806 m or 2,644 ft)
  - Sundial Peak (802 m or 2,631 ft)
  - Briggs Bluff (420 m or 1,378 ft)

  - Mount Stapylton (518 m or 1,699 ft)
  - Mount Wilson
  - Mount Zero (364 m or 1,194 ft)
  - Hollow Mountain

Ballarat and surrounding Highlands

- Mount Buninyong (746 m or 2,448 ft)
- Mount Warrenheip (740 m or 2,428 ft)
- Mount Franklin (648 m or 2,126 ft)
- Mount Beckworth (634 m or 2,080 ft)

=== Other Victorian mountains ===
- Mountains located within Victoria not within a range
  - Mount Ritchie (1,259 m or 4,131 ft)
  - Mount Toorongo (1,247 m or 4,091 ft)
  - Mount Horsfall (1,130 m or 3,707 ft)
  - Camels Hump (1,011 m or 3,317 ft)
  - Mount Kaye (998 m or 3,274 ft)
  - Mount Buangor (986 m or 3,235 ft)
  - Mount Elizabeth (941 m or 3,087 ft)
  - Langi Ghiran (949 m or 3,114 ft)
  - Mount Riddell (805 m or 2,641 ft)
  - Mount Disappointment (794 m or 2,605 ft)
  - Mount Beenak (745 m or 2,444 ft)
  - Mount Alexander (744 m or 2,441 ft)
  - Hanging Rock / Mount Diogenes (718 m or 2,356 ft)
  - Mount Dandenong (633 m or 2,077 ft)
    - Corhanwarrabul (628 m or 2,060 ft)
  - Mount Tarrengower (556 m or 1,824 ft)
  - Mount Warrenmang (526 m or 1,726 ft)
  - Mount Napier (440 m or 1,444 ft)
  - Mount Arapiles (369 m or 1,211 ft)
  - Mount Rouse (367 m or 1,204 ft)
  - Flinders Peak (364 m or 1,194 ft)
  - Mount Noorat (310 m or 1,017 ft)
  - Mount Warrnambool (216 m or 709 ft)
  - Mount Pollock (184 m or 604 ft)
  - Mount Wycheproof (148 m or 486 ft)
  - Mount Cooper (137 m or 449 ft)
  - Mount Eccles (178 m or 5083 ft)
  - Mount Elephant (380 m or 1,250 ft)
  - Mount Hopeless
  - Mount Leura
  - Mount Sugarloaf (Camperdown, Victoria)
  - Mount Strathbogie (1,045 m or 3,428 ft)

== Western Australia ==
- Carnarvon Range
- Mount Augustus (1105m)
- Mount Beadell
- Darling Range
  - Mount Dale
  - Mount Cooke
- Hamersley Range
  - Mount Meharry (at 1,249 metres above sea level, the highest peak in Western Australia)
  - Mount Bruce (1,221 m; the second highest peak in WA)
  - Mount Nameless/Jarndunmunha 1,115 m
- Wunaamin Miliwundi Ranges, formerly King Leopold Ranges
- Mount Lesueur
- Porongurup Range
- Stirling Range
  - Bluff Knoll (1,099m)
  - Toolbrunup (998m)
  - Mount Magog
  - Mount Trio
  - Mount Hassell
  - Talyuberlup Peak
- Peak Charles National Park
  - Peak Charles
  - Peak Eleanora
- West Mount Barren
- East Mount Barren
- Mount Wells (983m)
- Mount Ord (947m)
- Mount Teague
- Mount Manypeaks
