= Mount Hopeless =

Mount Hopeless is the name of several mountains:

- Mount Hopeless (South Australia)
- Mount Hopeless (New South Wales)
- Mount Hopeless (Queensland)
- Mount Hopeless (Victoria)
- Mount Hopeless (New Zealand)
