= Lambs Head =

- Kahlpahlim Rock
- Location within Queensland

Highest point
- Elevation: 1,309 m (4,295 ft)
- Coordinates: 17.0175°S 145.6349°E

Geography
- Location: Mareeba, Queensland, Australia

Lambs Head, also known as Kahlpahlim Rock, is a mountain near Mareeba in the Dinden National Park, Far North Queensland, Australia. Lambs Head rises 1,309 metres (4,295 ft) and is the highest point on the Lamb Range.

There are two trails that when combined, create a difficult 12.3 km circuit that takes hikers to the summit and back.

== See also ==
- List of mountains of Australia
