= Mount Fainter South =

Mountain in Victoria, Australia

- Location within Alpine Shire

Highest point
- Elevation: 1,883 metres (6,178 ft) AHD
- Coordinates: 36°51′15″S 147°11′23″E

Geography
- Location: Victoria, Australia
- Parent range: Victorian Alps, Great Dividing Range

Mount Fainter South is a mountain in the Victorian Alps of the Great Dividing Range, located in the Australian state of Victoria. The summit is at 1,883 metres (6,178 ft) AHD and is located in the Alpine National Park.

== See also ==
- List of mountains in Australia § Victoria
