= Forty Lake Peak =

Mountain in Tasmania, Australia

- Location within Tasmania Location within Australia

Highest point
- Elevation: 1,248 m (4,094 ft)
- Listing: Mountains of Tasmania
- Coordinates: 41°45′45″S 146°25′08″E

Forty Lake Peak is a peak in Australia. It is in the municipality of the Central Highlands and the state of Tasmania, in the southeast part of the country, 800 km south of the capital Canberra. The elevation of the peak is roughly 1,239 metres above sea level, and 11 metres above the surrounding territory.
