= Haystack Mountain (New South Wales) =

Mountain in New South Wales, Australia

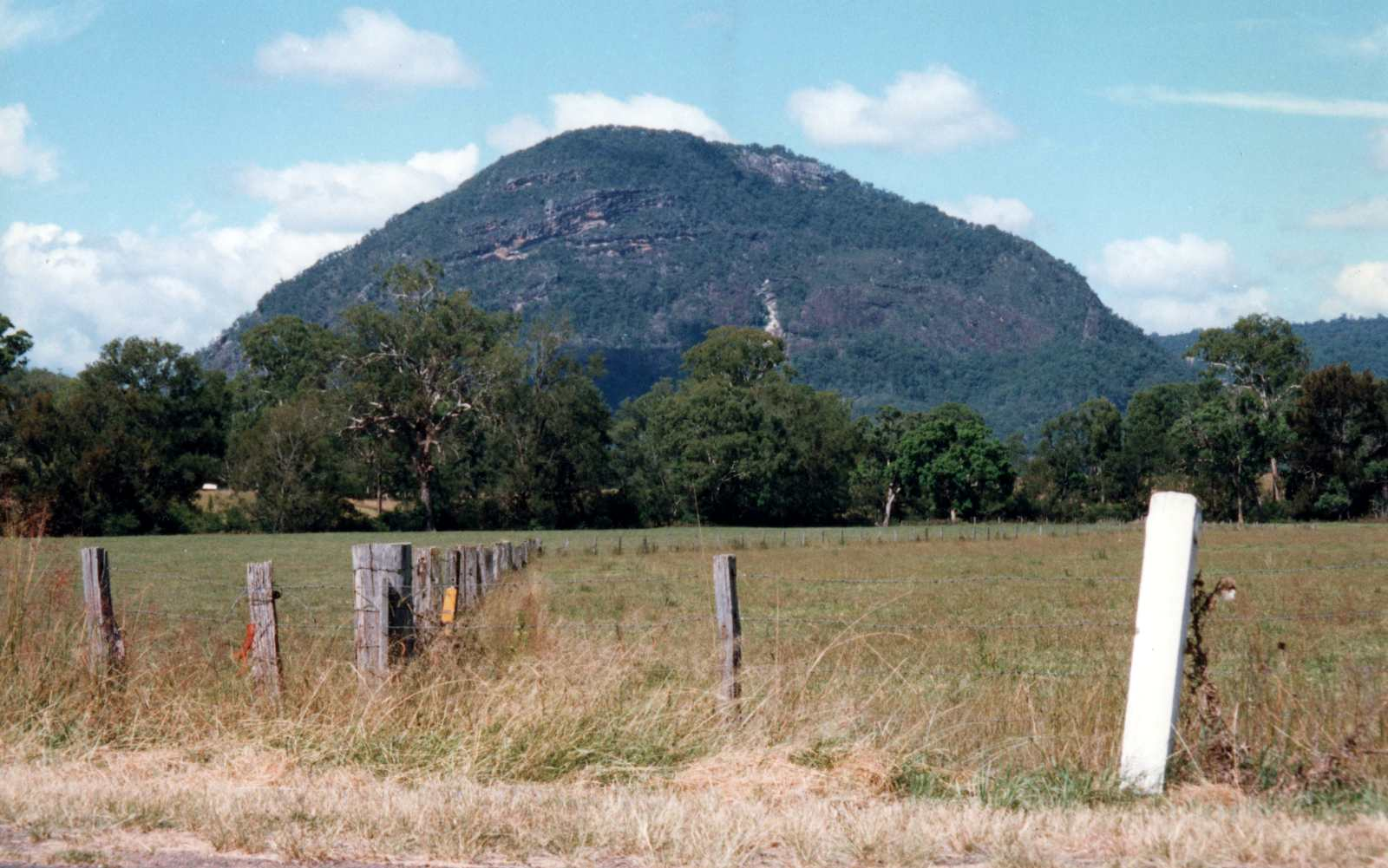

Highest point
- Elevation: 859 m (2,818 ft)
- Coordinates: 28°37′16″S 152°30′36″E

Geography
- Location within New South Wales
- Location: Northern Rivers, New South Wales, Australia

Haystack Mountain is a mountain in the north-east of New South Wales, Australia. The closest large town is Kyogle. Sub tropical rainforest on the mountain contains many species of plants, including the black booyong and yellow carabeen.

== See also ==
- List of mountains of New South Wales
