= Mount Gladstone =

Mountain in Alberta, Canada

Coordinates: 49°19′12″N 114°13′50″W

- Location within Alberta

Highest point
- Elevation: 2,458 m (8,064 ft)

Geography
- Location: Alberta, Canada
- Parent range: Clark Range

Mount Gladstone is a summit in Alberta, Canada.

Mount Gladstone was named for W. S. Gladstone, a pioneer citizen.
