= Mount Bithongabel =

Mountain in New South Wales and Queensland

- Location within New South Wales Location within Queensland Location within Australia

Highest point
- Elevation: 1,195 m (3,921 ft)
- Prominence: 820 m (2,690 ft)
- Coordinates: 28°15′50″S 153°10′21″E

Geography
- Location: Queensland/New South Wales, Australia
- Parent range: McPherson Range

Mount Bithongabel is a mountain summit located in the McPherson Range on the Queensland/New South Wales border in Australia. It forms part of Lamington National Park on the Queensland part of the mountain. The mountain's name, Bithongabel, appears to have been derived from a Yugambeh–Bundjalung word, "n'ywongabil", which apparently mean 'where birds seen'.
