= Mount Tidbinbilla =

Hill in the Australian Capital Territory

- Tidbinbilla Mountain

Highest point
- Elevation: 1,617 m (5,305 ft)
- Prominence: 497 m (1,631 ft)
- Isolation: 9.06 km (5.63 mi) to Mount Franklin
- Coordinates: 35.445499°S 148.867727°W

Geography
- Location: Australian Capital Territory, Australia

Mount Tidbinbilla is a hill in the Australian Capital Territory, Australia. It is located in the Tidbinbilla Nature Reserve. It is located in the Tidbinbilla Range of the southern Great Dividing Range and has an elevation of 1,617 metres.
