= Mount Hopeless (New South Wales) =

Mountain in New South Wales, Australia

- Location within New South Wales

Highest point
- Elevation: 1,056 m (3,465 ft)
- Coordinates: 34°02′14″S 150°02′45″E

Geography
- Location: Central Tablelands, New South Wales, Australia
- Parent range: Great Dividing Range

Climbing
- Easiest route: Walk (hike)

Mount Hopeless is a mountain in the Central Tablelands region of New South Wales, Australia.

The mountain is situated between the headwaters of Doris Creek about 2 kilometres (1.2 mi) south by east of Mount Goondel in the Oberon local government area.

== See also ==
- List of mountains of Australia
