= Mount Hopeless (Victoria) =

Mountain in Victoria, Australia

Mount Hopeless (37°12′S 147°46′E) is a mountain in Victoria, Australia. It is in a range on the eastern side of the Tambo River near Mount Bindi, Mount Tongio, and Mount Elizabeth. It was named by Edward John Eyre after he spied the mountain peak during an exploratory journey in 1840. It was later a destination goal of the Burke and Wills expedition in 1861, but Burke and Wills failed to make it to the mountain.

== See also ==
- List of mountains in Australia § Victoria
