= Guthega =

- Town
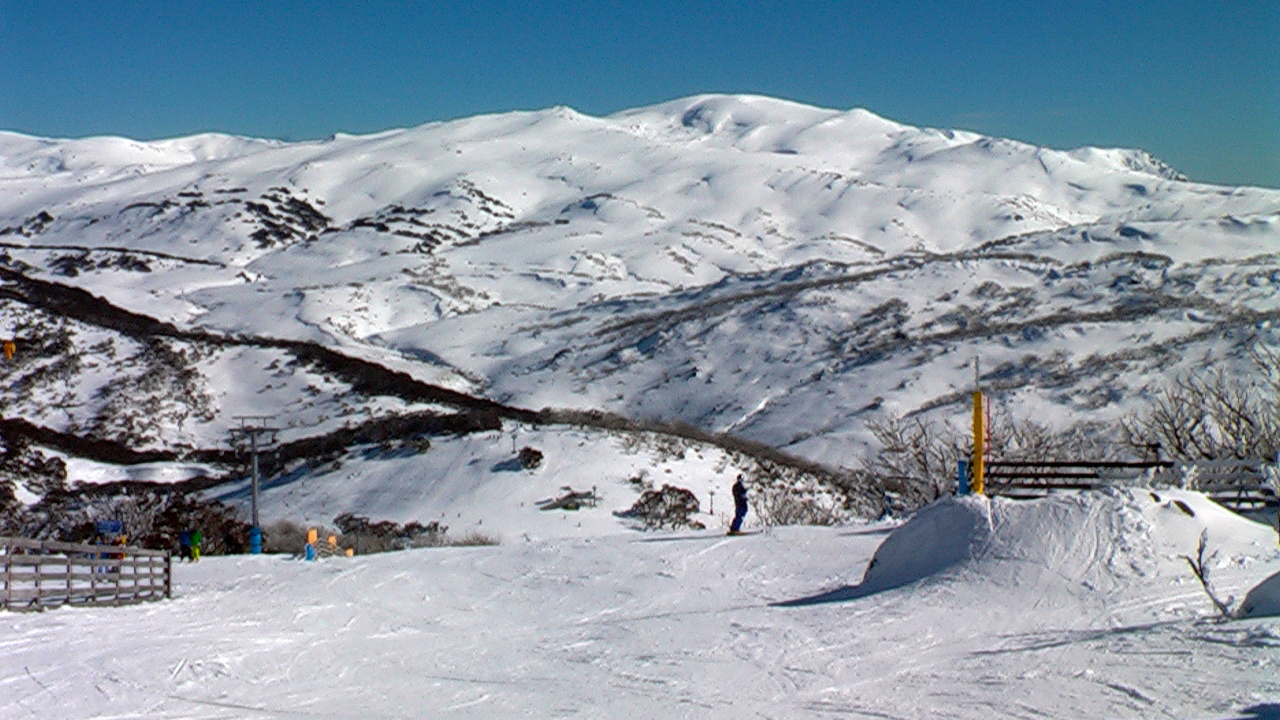
- The Main Range from Guthega Peak, July 2011

- Coordinates: 36°23′S 148°22′E
- Country: Australia
- State: New South Wales
- LGA: Snowy Monaro Regional Council
- Location: 501 km (311 mi) SW of Sydney; 219 km (136 mi) SSW of Canberra; 102 km (63 mi) W of Cooma; 43 km (27 mi) W of Jindabyne; 286 km (178 mi) NNE of Bairnsdale

Government
  - State electorate: Monaro
  - Federal division: Eden-Monaro
- Elevation: 1,640 m (5,380 ft)
- Postcode: 2624

Guthega is an alpine village and the site for a hydro electric dam located in the Kosciuszko National Park, on the upper reaches of the Snowy River, on the western face of Mount Blue Cow, Snowy Mountains of New South Wales, Australia.

The village is made up of private lodges, a restaurant and bar, commercial accommodation, and facilities for snow sports and other outdoor recreation.

Guthega is also the site for the Guthega Power Station - a dam used to generate hydro electricity as part of the Snowy Mountains Scheme, now managed by Snowy Hydro.

== History ==
The Aboriginal cultural group Ngarigo were nomadic between Canberra, the Monaro plains, and into the Snowy Mountains for over 20,000 years. Pressures from European Settlers caused an increase in intertribal wars possibly taking place in the mountain areas around the Snowy River and similar water ways. Diseases introduced by the settlers such as Small Pox, Syphilis, Influenza, Measles and Tuberculosis devastated Aboriginal populations, and by 1850 the survivors had all moved off their traditional lands, giving up their lifestyles to live with the Europeans around Cooma.

Herbert Schlink, Eric Fischer, William Gordon and John Laidley, of the Ski Club of Australia, with W Hughes, made the first winter crossing of the Main Range from Kiandra to Kosciusko in 1927.

Guthega was declared a dam and hydro electric power station site by the Snowy Mountains Scheme in 1949. Road works for the Guthega Power Station began in 1951 with the dam beginning in 1952. A Norwegian group was contracted to build the power station, and Guthega became known as "Little Norway", containing the largest number of Norwegians living outside Norway at the time. Power was first generated by the station 1955.

Recreational skiing began at Guthega in the late 1950s with the first rope tow for downhill skiing being installed on Mount Tate's East Ridge by the SMA Ski Club in 1957. The YMCA Ski Club (now the Brindabella Ski Club) built two huts and one rope tow in 1960, and started running ski lessons with lodging. The SMA Tow hut burned down in 1965 and it was not replaced, but the first T-bar tow was erected on the West slopes of Mount Blue Calf that same year. In 1966 Walter Spanring and his wife Hannelore (Eberstaller), key developers of Guthega's ski areas to date, built the Guthega Hotel (later becoming the Guthega Alpine Hotel). In 1974 Peter Aynsley designed the Australian Ski Club lodge next to the Guthega Hotel and with financial assistance from the smaller ski clubs in the area, expansion of the skiing facilities on the West Face of Mount Blue Calf began in 1975. In 1980 new investors were brought in, and further development saw car parks, a chairlift, a ski centre and general upgrades completed by 1983. Guthega's new ski facilities were launched in 1983 with an international marketing campaign that included:

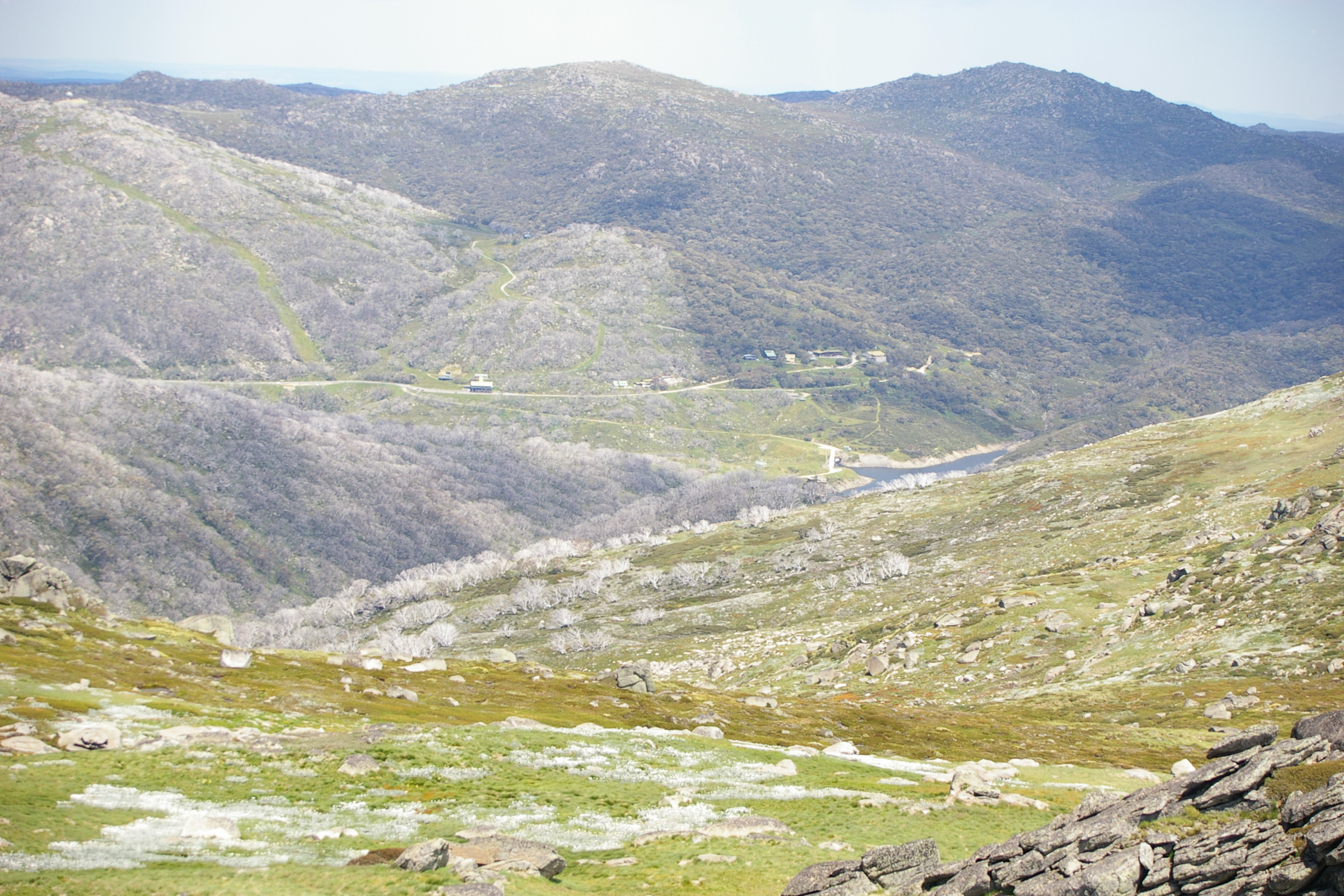
Looking to Guthega from Mount Tate.

- Range Rover Australian Freestyle Championships
- Peter Stuyvesant International Pro-Am Dual Slalom
- Cold Chisel in concert at The Lake Jindabyne Hotel
- Ovaltine ski racing for amateurs and recreational skiers

In 1991, Guthega was purchased by the Alpine Australia Group Pty Limited, the then operator of the Blue Cow Resort. This led to the operation of two resorts becoming integrated under the name Blue Cow-Guthega in 1992. Day access into Guthega then became possible via the Skitube alpine railway and the Blue Cow and Link Management Unit ski slopes. The Blue Cow-Guthega and Perisher-Smiggins resort areas were subsequently merged to become the Perisher complex.

Guthega is one of the four connected resort areas within Perisher, operating two chairlifts and two T-bars. As well as downhill skiing, Guthega serves as a base for alpine and cross country skiers and boarders seeking access to relatively sheltered aspects and wilderness experiences, as well ice climbers heading to Blue Lake. In summer months it is used as a destination for sight seers and people enjoying recreation in the surrounding Kosciuszko National Park.

== Natural features ==
- Snowy River
- Mount Blue Calf
- Blue Lake
- Snowy Mountains

== See also ==
- Skiing in Australia
- Guthega Power Station
- Snowy Mountains Scheme
- Perisher Ski Resort
