= Ski Club of Australia =

Private club and ski lodge

The Ski Club of Australia is a private club and ski lodge located in Thredbo, New South Wales, Australia. It was founded in 1920 and as its foundation pre-dated the foundation of the Ski Council of New South Wales in 1929, it played a pivotal role in the history of skiing and ski racing in Australia. Four members of the Ski Club, Herbert Schlink, Eric Fisher, William Gordon and John Laidley, made the first winter crossing of the Snowy Mountains Main Range from Kiandra to Kosciusko in 1927. Slalom skiing was introduced into Australia by the club. The club formerly had an official role in Australian skiing and its 75th anniversary history was written by Olympian Bob Arnott.

== Notable members ==
- 1956 and 1960 Olympian and pilot Christine Davy
- 1952 Olympian and company director Bob Arnott
- Gardener Beatrice Bligh
- Politician Tom Mitchell
- Engineer, businessman and benefactor Andrew Thyne Reid
- Gynaecologist and hospital administrator Sir Herbert Schlink
- Solicitor and company director Sir Alastair Stephen

== Website ==
The club website is only accessible to members.
