= Main Range =

Main Range may mean:

- Main Range National Park, Queensland, Australia
- Main Range (Snowy Mountains), New South Wales, Australia

== See also ==
- Main Ranges, also known as the Park Ranges, a group of mountain ranges in the Canadian Rockies
- Titiwangsa Mountains, sometimes known as the Main Range, a mountain range in the Malay Peninsula
