= Mount Tate (New South Wales) =

Mountain in New South Wales, Australia

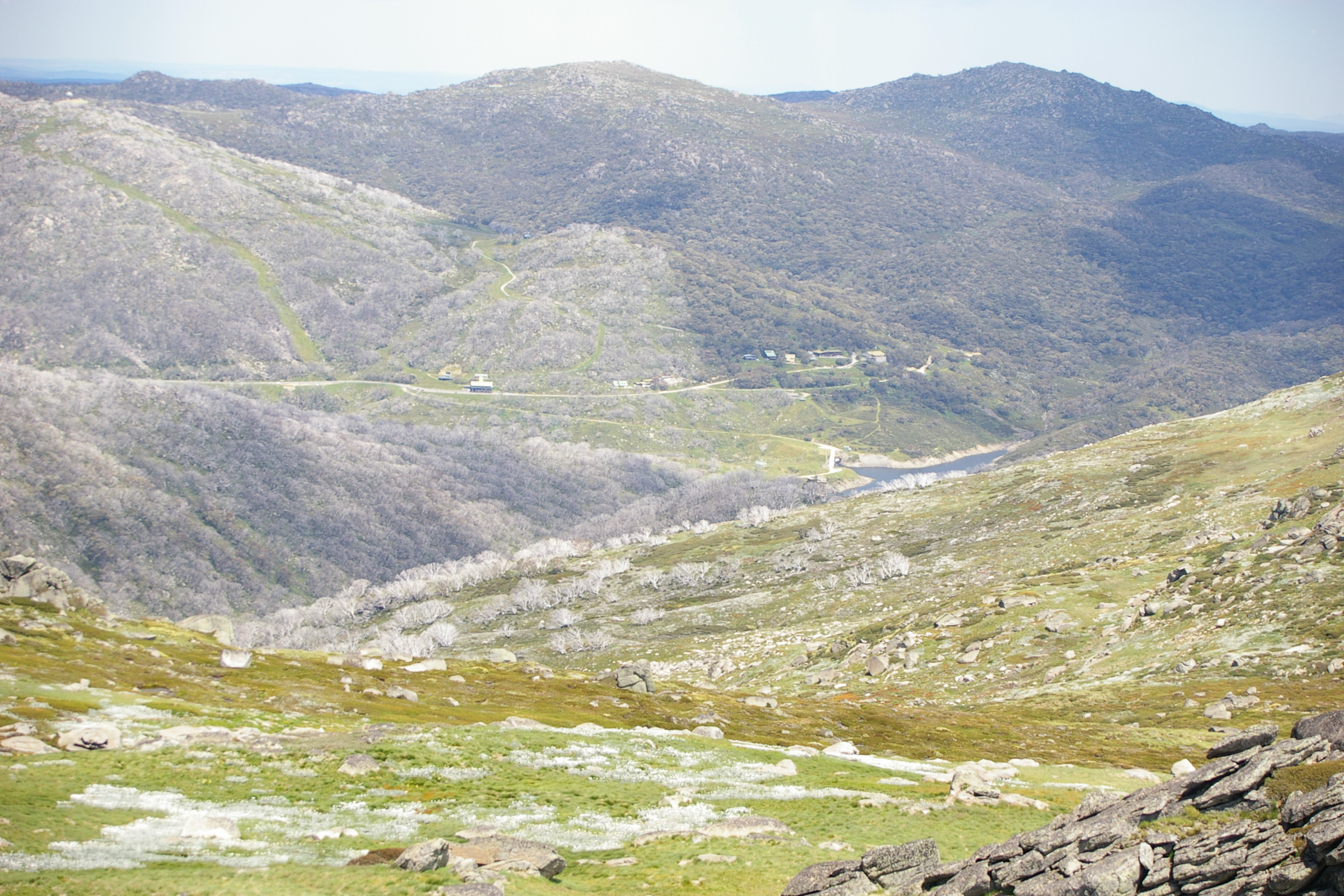
- The view southeast from Mount Tate

Highest point
- Elevation: 2,068 m (6,785 ft)
- Prominence: 188 m (617 ft)
- Isolation: 5.59 km (3.47 mi)
- Coordinates: 36°21′S 148°21′E

Geography
- Location within New South Wales
- Location: Snowy Mountains, New South Wales, Australia
- Parent range: Main Range, Great Dividing Range

Climbing
- Easiest route: Walk (hike)

Mount Tate is a prominent rocky mountain on the Main Range of the Snowy Mountains located in southeastern New South Wales, Australia.

With an elevation of 2,068 metres (6,785 ft) above sea level, Mount Tate has two ridges running north and south, named Tate West Ridge and Tate East Ridge, referring to the side of the Great Divide where they lie. It has views along the Main Range towards Mount Twynam and down to the Geehi Valley.

The mountain is situated approximately 3 kilometres (1.9 mi) northeast of Guthega and southwest of Guthega Power Station.

== See also ==
- Australian Alps
- List of mountains of Australia § New South Wales
