= Ram Head =

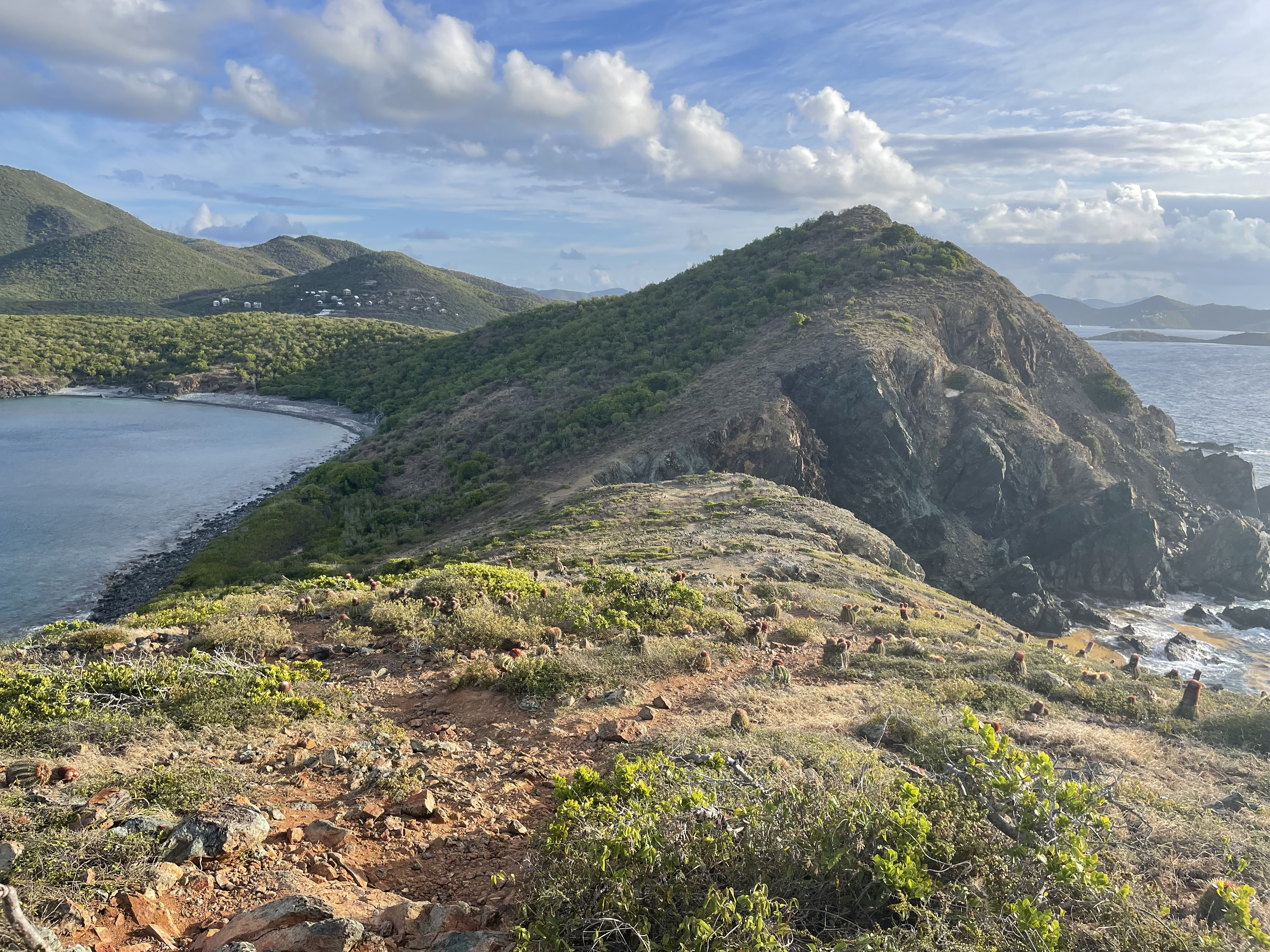
Ram Head, Saint John, VI

Ram Head or Rame Head may refer to:

- Ram Head, a headland within the Bay of Isles on South Georgia Island, Antarctica
- Ram Head, a headland in Massachusetts Bay, Massachusetts, United States
- Ram Head, the southernmost point on Saint John, U.S. Virgin Islands
- Rame Head, a headland in Cornwall, England also known as Ram Head
- Rame Head (Victoria), a headland in Victoria, Australia also known as Ram Head
- Rams Head, a mountain in the Ramshead Range of Australia
- Ram's head, a common name for the mushroom Grifola frondosa
