= Carruthers Peak =

Mountain in New South Wales, Australia

- Curruthers Peak
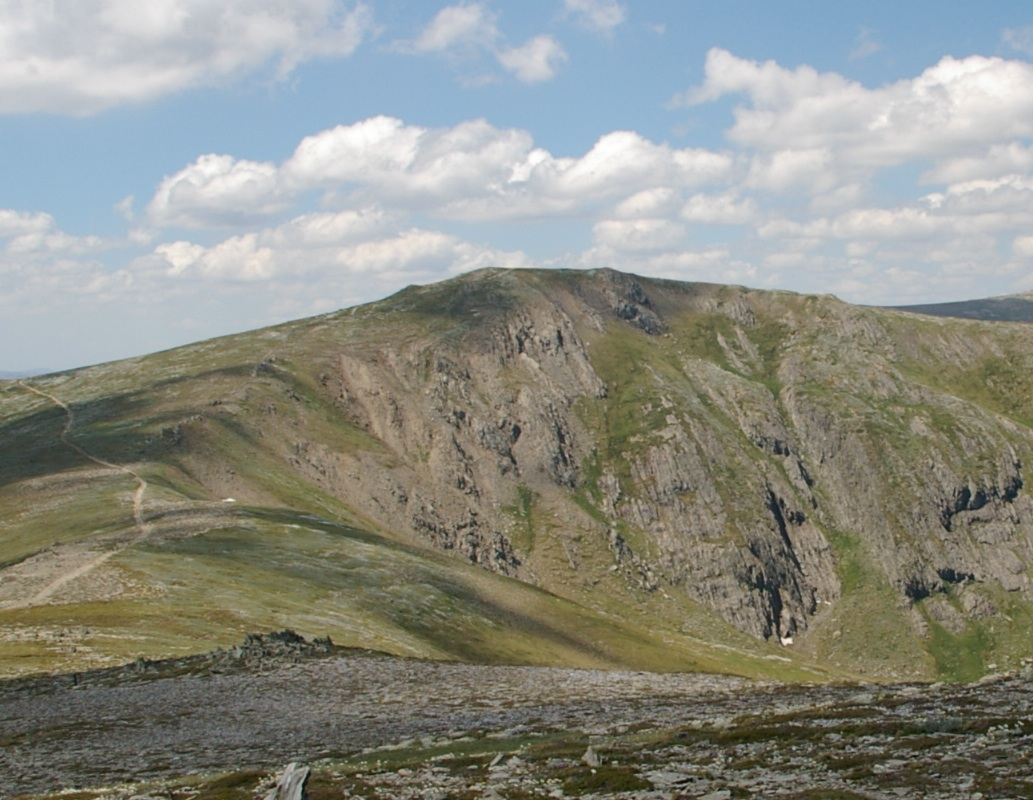
- Carruthers Peak from the south

Highest point
- Elevation: 2,145 m (7,037 ft)
- Prominence: 85 m (279 ft)
- Isolation: 2.71 km (1.68 mi)
- Coordinates: 36°24′31″S 148°17′28″E

Geography
- Location within New South Wales
- Location: Snowy Mountains, New South Wales, Australia
- Parent range: Main Range, Great Dividing Range
- Topo map: Perisher Valley

Climbing
- Easiest route: Walk (hike)

Carruthers Peak, formerly Curruthers Peak, a mountain in the Main Range of the Great Dividing Range, is located in Snowy Mountains region in southeast New South Wales, Australia. The peak is situated between Mount Lee and Mount Twynam within the Kosciuszko National Park.

With an elevation of 2,145 metres (7,037 ft) above sea level, Carruthers Peak is the seventh-highest peak in mainland Australia.

It was named after Joseph Carruthers, a Premier of New South Wales, who, while he served as Minister for Lands, facilitated the building of the Summit Road to Mount Kosciuszko. It can be easily accessed, with the Main Range walk going straight up it.

== Geology ==
The area around it contains patches of the rare windswept feldmark ecotope. Due to a century of grazing on the Main Range, the area around it was heavily eroded. From the 1950s Soil Conservation Service undertook an extensive program of rehabilitation of the vegetation of the Carruthers Peak–Mount Twynam area using bitumen, wire netting and bales of straw. It lies on a vein of shale running south-southeast through the predominant granite.

== See also ==
- Australian Alps
- List of mountains of Australia § New South Wales
