= Andor Mészáros =

Hungarian-Australian architect, sculptor, and medallist

Andor Mészáros (1 September 1900 – 1 May 1972) was a Hungarian-Australian architect, sculptor, and medallist.

== Early life and education ==
Andor Mészáros was born on 1 September 1900 in Budapest, Hungary, the son of lawyer Alexander Mészáros and his wife, sculptor Bertha née Grünsberg.

He attended high school in Budapest and served in the Hungarian cavalry in 1918.

From 1919 to 1924, he studied mechanical engineering at the Vienna University of Technology, then sculpture at the Académie Julian in Paris from 1924 to 1925, studying under Henri Bouchard, Paul Landowski, and in the studio of József Csáky.

He then studied architecture at the Technical University of Budapest until 1927.

== Career ==
=== Architecture ===
After two years of training as a draughtsman with architects Móric Pogány and as a civil engineer with József Vágó, he was licensed by the Hungarian Chamber of Architects and began working as an architect. He collaborated closely with sculptor and medallist Eduard "Ede" Telcs, for whom he developed several architectural designs for fountains. In 1932, he opened his own office.

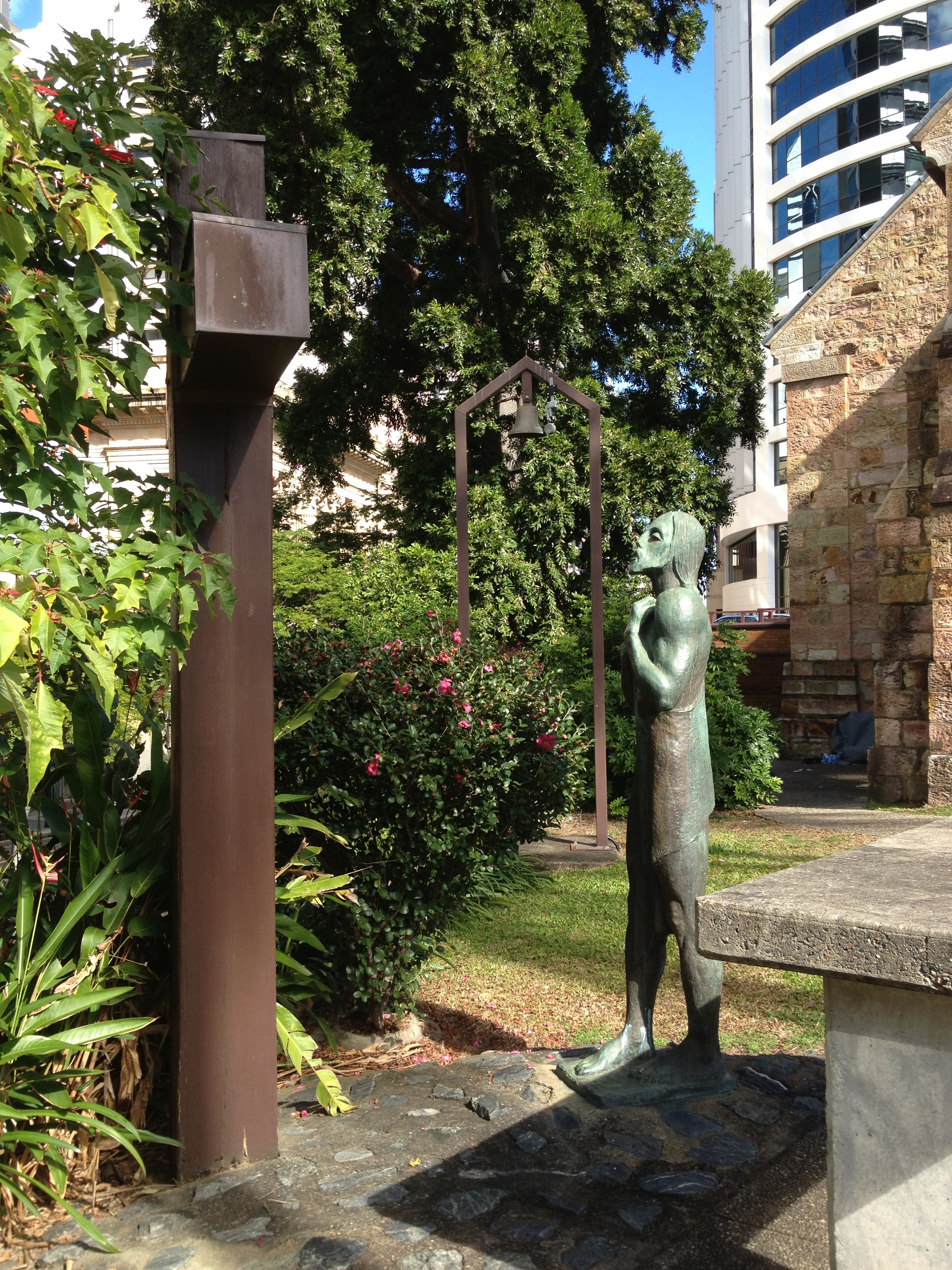
Christ Accepts His Cross, All Saints Anglican Church in Brisbane

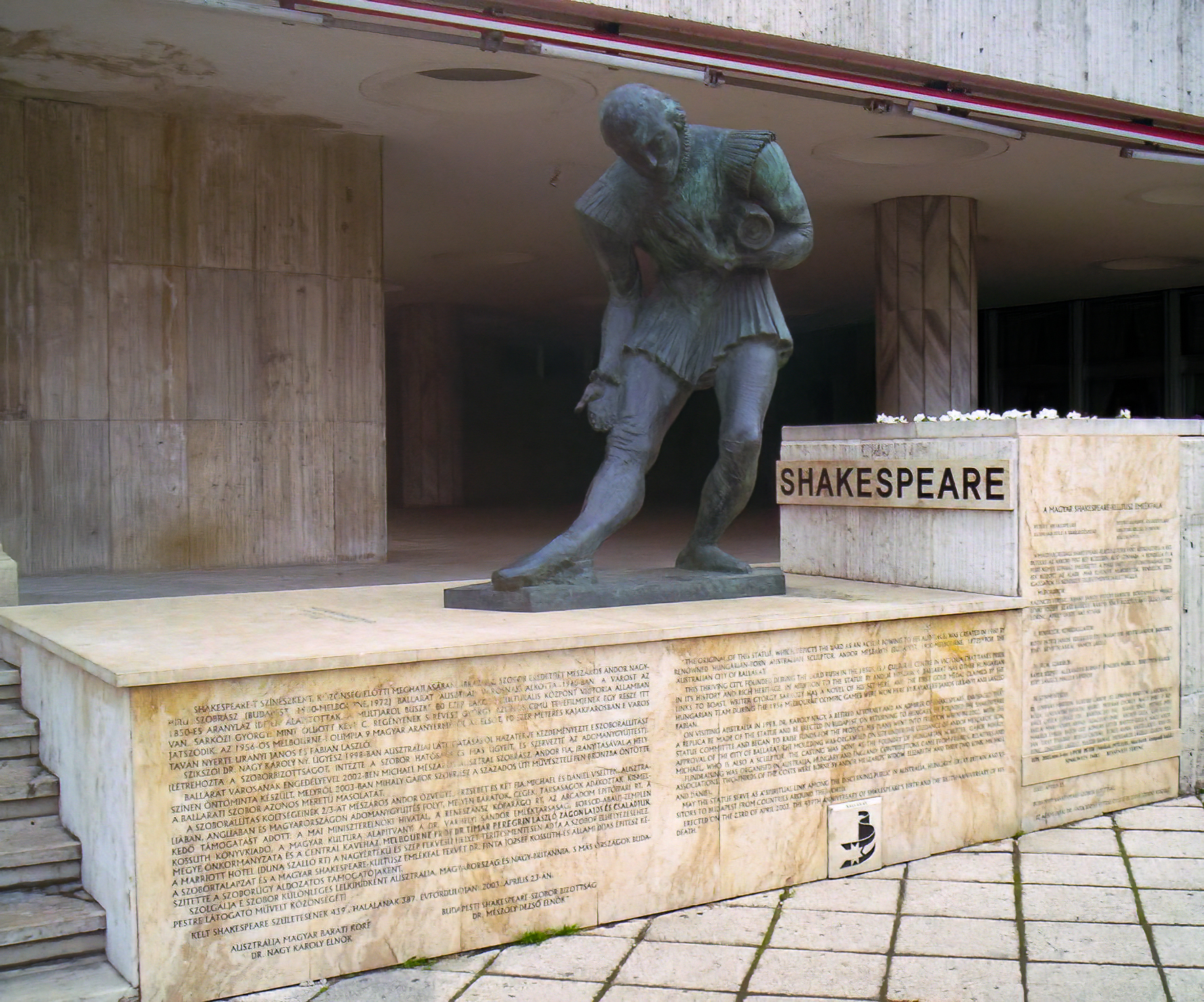
Replica of the Shakespeare statue in Budapest

In 1939, due to the impending war, he emigrated to Australia and arrived in Melbourne on 21 June 1939. He was considered an enemy alien, and worked for a year in the architectural offices of J. V. T. Ward and Marsh & Michaelson. With the support of friends such as zoologist Wilfred Eade Agar and physician Herbert Schlink, Mészáros was able to pursue his artistic career. In 1940, his wife followed him to Melbourne with their son.

=== Sculpture ===
His early works include three stone figures – Maternity (1944), The Surgeon (1945), and King George V (1946) – which he created for the Royal Prince Alfred Hospital in Sydney.

In 1949, he spent several months in England working on the altarpiece for St. Anselm's Chapel, Canterbury Cathedral, and completed the Canterbury Series of medallions, depicting the Stations of the Cross.

From the 1950s onwards, he undertook several major commissions in Australia, including The Resurrection (1954), a sandstone figure as an altarpiece for the chapel of the Sydney Church of England Grammar School (Shore School); a Triumphal Cross for St Peter's Cathedral in Adelaide in 1955; a Shakespeare statue for the city of Ballarat in 1960; the bronze figure Christ Accepts His Cross for the All Saints Anglican Church in Brisbane in 1962; and a group of figures for the Supreme Court in Darwin in 1964, which sparked some controversy.

=== Medals ===
In between his sculptural commissions, Mészáros designed over 1000 medals, including an honorary medal for the Victorian Artists Society in 1947, the Olympic Games Participants' Medal in 1956, the "Pattern Swan Dollar" (also known as the Goose Dollar) in 1967, and The Vietnam Medal for ANZAC soldiers in the Vietnam War in 1968.

He designed the inaugural ANZAAS Medal for the Australian and New Zealand Association for the Advancement of Science in 1965. He also created portrait medals of figures such as David Rivett (c. 1966), Howard Florey (1963), and Robert Menzies (1969).

=== Other work ===
In 1945, Mészáros illustrated Frederick Oswald Barnett's book I Hear the Tramp of Millions.

== Recognition ==
In 1951, Mészáros won the top prize at the International Medal Exhibition in Madrid, Spain, and in 1964, he received a Purchase Prize at the International Medal Competition in Arezzo, Italy.

== Other roles and activities ==
Mészáros served as president of the Victorian Sculptors' Society from 1954 to 1955 and from 1962 to 1963, and from 1967 to 1969, he was the first president of the Association of Sculptors of Victoria.

He was a member of the International Federation of Medallists and the Amici Della Medaglia in Italy.

== Personal life ==
Mészáros married Erzsébet Back (also Elizabeth Bakk) on 1 December 1932 in Budapest, and they had two children. Their first son, Daniel, was born in 1935. His younger son, Michael Meszaros was born in 1945.

== Later life, death, and legacy ==
From 1970 onwards, Mészáros collaborated with his younger son Michael Mészáros. His older son Daniel worked as an architect, and his granddaughter Anna Meszaros is a sculptor.

Mészáros died on 1 May 1972 in South Melbourne and was cremated. A portrait of Mészáros painted in 1961 by L. Scott Pendlebury is in the possession of the family.

The Association of Sculptors of Victoria awards the Andor Meszaros Prize every two years.
