= Rams Head =

Mountain in New South Wales, Australia

- Location within New South Wales

Highest point
- Elevation: 2,190 m (7,190 ft)
- Prominence: 110 metres (360 ft)
- Isolation: 3.74 kilometres (2.32 mi)
- Coordinates: 36°29′23″S 148°15′39″E

Geography
- Location: Snowy Mountains, New South Wales, Australia
- Parent range: Ramshead Range

The Rams Head is a mountain located in the Ramshead Range of the Snowy Mountains in New South Wales, Australia.

The Aetherius Society considers it to be one of its 19 holy mountains.

== Geography ==
With an elevation of 2,190 metres (7,190 ft) above sea level, its summit is the fourth highest mountain in New South Wales and the fourth highest mountain in Australia. The mountain is contained within the Kosciuszko National Park. The summit of the mountain offers views of the Main Range.

== Recreation ==
Located south of Mount Kosciuszko, the mountain attracts hikers in the summer, and during the winter months is covered with snow for back country skiers and alpine touring.

== See also ==
- Australian Alps
- List of mountains of Australia § New South Wales
