= Bob Arnott =

Australian alpine skier (1922–2016)

William Robert Arnott (13 October 1922 – 23 January 2016) was an Australian alpine skier who competed in the 1952 Winter Olympics.

== Family and education ==
Arnott was the great-grandson of William Arnott, who founded Arnott's Biscuits. His father, Henry Dixon Arnott, was a barrister and President of the Royal Aero Club of New South Wales. He was born in Sydney and attended Cranbrook School and the University of Sydney where he graduated as a Bachelor of Science in 1945. Arnott married Simone Emile Pirenne in 1965 and had two children: Adrienne Davina Pirenne Arnott (born in 1969); and Robert Axel Pirenne Arnott (born in 1970).

== Club ==
Arnott was a member of the Ski Club of Australia and was the author of its 75th anniversary history. He was the legend of NSW alpine who competed in the 1952 Olympics. He also assisted in the development of the Federation International SKI (FIS).
