= Herbert Schlink =

Australian gynaecologist and hospital administrator

Sir Herbert Henry Schlink Knight Bachelor
- Born: Herbert Henry Schlink; March 28, 1883; Wodonga, Victoria, Australia
- Died: November 30, 1962 (aged 79)
- Education: University of Sydney
- Occupations: Medical doctor, hospital administrator, healthcare policy maker
- Known for: Contributions to gynecology, cancer treatment, health policy, and winter sports
- Spouse: Margaret “Meg” Mulvey (m. 1945–1962)
- Parent(s): Albert Schlink, Maria Francesca Trudewind
- Awards: Knight Bachelor (1954)

Herbert Henry “Bertie” Schlink (28 March 1883 – 30 November 1962) was an Australian medical doctor, hospital administrator, and healthcare policy maker. He was also active in winter sports.

== Biography ==
Herbert Schlink was born in Wodonga, Australia, on 28 March 1883 as the seventh of eight children. He attended public school in Wodonga and, until 1900, St. Patrick's College in Goulburn, New South Wales. At St. John's College of the University of Sydney, he earned a Bachelor of Medicine (MB) and in 1907 a Master of Surgery (MCh).

At the Royal Prince Alfred Hospital, a teaching hospital in Sydney, he became junior resident medical officer in 1907, assistant superintendent in 1909, and superintendent in 1911. In 1912, he opened his own practice on Macquarie Street in Sydney.

In 1908, he joined the Australian Army Medical Corps and in 1914 became commander of a company stationed at the Liverpool Military Camp in 1915. After investigations in the Federal Parliament, Chief Justice George Rich ruled it inappropriate to appoint an officer of German origin as commander, and Schlink was removed from the camp despite his declarations of loyalty. He remained on the officer list until 1919.

From 1922, he was a gynecological surgeon at the Royal Prince Alfred Hospital. He specialized in treating pelvic cancer, initially through surgical procedures and later combined with radiotherapy using cobalt rays. He developed statistical methods for the systematic follow-up of cancer patients. In 1928, he attended the American College of Surgeons' congress in Boston and gave a lecture on women smoking cigarettes. In 1927, he co-founded the Royal Australasian College of Surgeons. In 1937, he traveled via the Suez Canal to Greece and Naples, then to Russia, France, Scandinavia, and England. In Paris, he acquainted himself with new technological advancements. In 1939, his textbook Gynaecology was published by Angus & Robertson, with revised and expanded editions in 1949 and 1955.

Herbert Schlink married physician Margaret “Meg” née Mulvey (1916–2001) at Saint Mary's Cathedral in 1945. He died on 30 November 1962 and was buried in Mona Vale.

Australian painter Frederick William “Fred” Leist (1873–1945) painted portraits of Schlink, which are housed at King George V Memorial Hospital and Royal Prince Alfred Hospital. Hungarian-Australian sculptor Andor Mészáros, whom Schlink supported from 1940, created the statue The Surgeon at Schlink's commission in 1944, which was installed at the entrance of King George V Memorial Hospital. After Schlink's death, he created a bust of Schlink, which is located at the Royal Prince Alfred Hospital.

== Health policy work ==
In 1925, Schlink became director of the Royal Prince Alfred Hospital; from 1934 to 1962, he was chairman of the hospital administration. In this role, he oversaw the opening of Gloucester House in Camperdown, the King George V Memorial Hospital for Mothers and Babies (1958), a nurses' home, neurosurgical and psychiatric departments, the Page Chest Pavilion, and a hospital chapel.

He proposed supplementing hospital funding with charitable insurance programs. In 1932, he was a founding member of the Hospital Contribution Fund. In 1936, he introduced a three-tiered system of private, intermediate, and publicly funded accommodations. In 1940, he published The hospital problem of the metropolitan and suburban area of Sydney. Under his leadership, the Royal Prince Alfred Hospital (nicknamed Schlinktown) became the country's leading teaching hospital.

In 1946, he was the founding president of the Australian Hospital Association and from 1949 to 1956 published the journal Australian Modern Hospital. In 1947, he co-founded the Medical Benefits Funds of Australia. In 1951, he was a founding member of the Blue Cross Association of Australia, became an honorary member of the American Hospital Association, and served as the Australian representative to the International Hospital Federation.

He also advised politicians Earle Page and Robert Menzies on health policy matters.

== Activities outside work ==
Schlink was an active winter sports enthusiast, often referred to as the “Father of Australian Skiing”. In 1909, he was a founding member and until 1920 president of the Kosciuszko Alpine Club. In the resulting Ski Club of Australia, he served as vice president from 1920 to 1930 and as president from 1931. From 1910, he was a member of the Ski Club of Great Britain and from 1928 an honorary member of the Kandahar Ski Club of Mürren in Switzerland.

On 28 July 1927, he led a group with Eric Fisher, William Gordon, William Hughes, and John Laidley to cross the main range of the Snowy Mountains from Kiandra to the Kosciuszko Hotel for the first time. In 1960, the pass between Guthega and Geehi was named in his honor. The Schlink Pass Road from the Guthega Road at the Snowy River to the Geehi Reservoir of the Geehi River is about 30 kilometers long, and along it is the Schlink Hut.

Schlink was also a member of the Royal Sydney Golf Club in Rose Bay.

== Memberships and honors ==
- 1929: Fellow of the Royal Geographical Society in London
- 1951: Fellow of the Royal College of Obstetricians and Gynaecologists in London
- 1954: Knight Bachelor

== Publications ==
- Ski-ing experiences in Europe, 1929. Sydney & Melbourne Publications, Sydney 1929, OCLC 10265869.
- Present position of surgery, radium and X rays in gynaecology. 1936, OCLC 642695960.
- Gynaecology. Angus & Robertson, Sydney/London 1939. New editions: 1949, 1955, OCLC 216729636.
- The hospital problem of the metropolitan and suburban area of Sydney. Australasian Medical Publishing, Sydney 1940, OCLC 217268342.
- with W. D. Cunningham: Gynaecology lectures. Sections 1 & 2 to nurses in training. Repatriation General Hospital, Concord, N.S.W. 1950, OCLC 221060578.
- Cancer of the Cervix Uteri. Australian Results, 1930–1950. In: BJOG – An International Journal of Obstetrics and Gynaecology. 57, 5, 1950, pp. 714–720, OCLC 5155910435.
- Cancer of the Female Pelvis. In: BJOG – An International Journal of Obstetrics and Gynaecology. 67, 3, 1960, pp. 402–410, OCLC 5155938868.

== Literature ==
- Albert James Perier: Portrait of Dr. Herbert Schlink (?), President of the Ski Club of Australia, Mount Kosciusko. Around 1926, OCLC 730620519.
- Kempson Maddox: Schlink of Prince Alfred. A Biography of Sir Herbert Schlink. Royal Prince Alfred Hospital, 1978, ISBN 0-9598171-5-8.
