= Guthega Power Station =

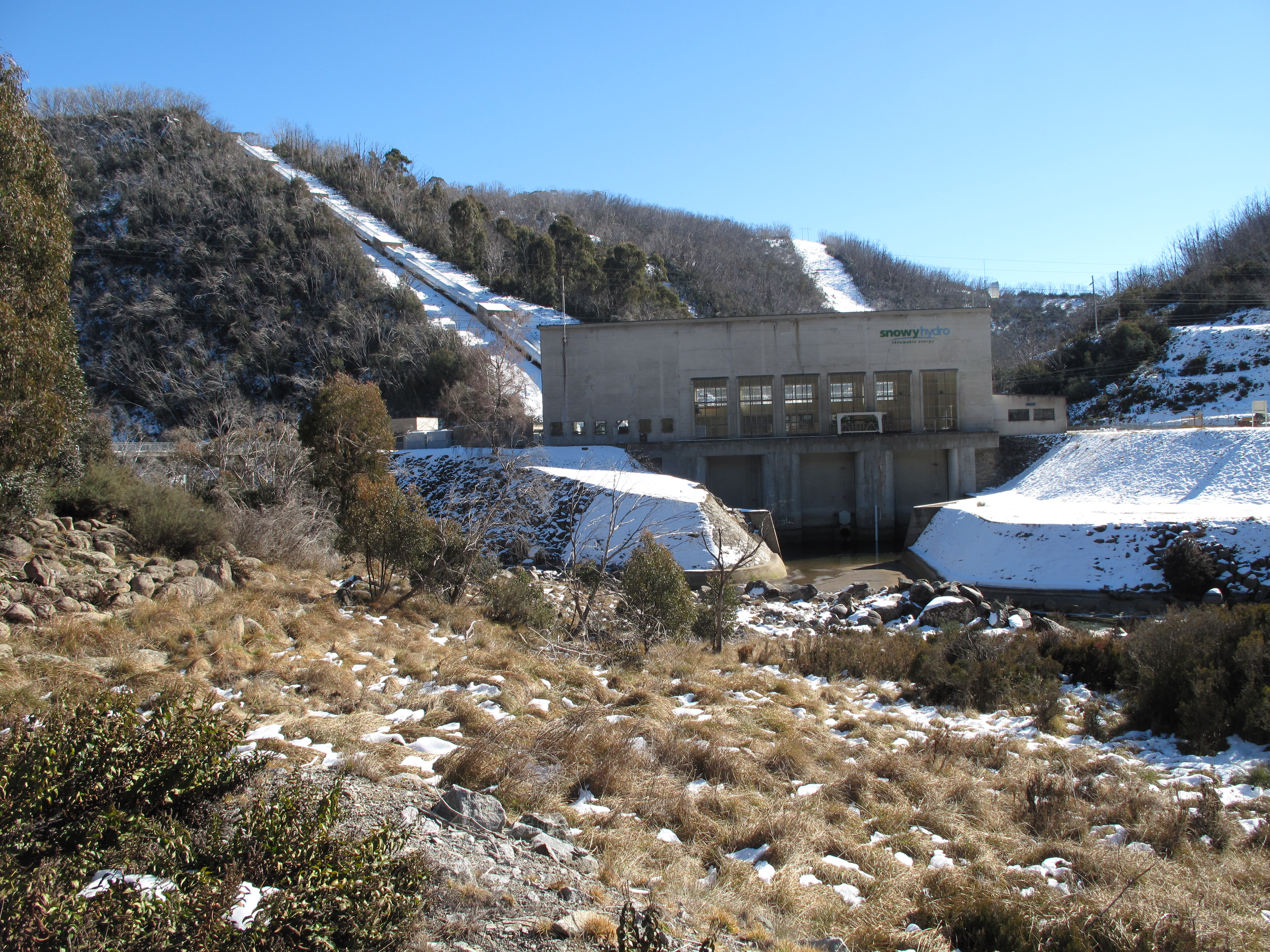
- Power Station viewed from across the Snowy River
- Location: Snowy Mountains, New South Wales
- Coordinates: 36°20′58″S 148°24′50″E
- Status: Operational
- Construction began: November 1951
- Opening date: April 1955
- Owner(s): Snowy Hydro

Power Station
- Hydraulic head: 246.9m (810 ft)
- Turbines: 2
- Installed capacity: 60 MW (80,000 hp)
- Annual generation: 172 GWh (620 TJ)

Guthega Power Station is located in the Snowy Mountains region of New South Wales, Australia. The power station's purpose is for the generation of electricity. It is the first to be completed and smallest of the initial seven hydroelectric power stations that comprise the Snowy Mountains Scheme, a vast hydroelectricity and irrigation complex constructed in south-east Australia between 1949 and 1974 and now run by Snowy Hydro.

This station is connected to the National Electricity Market via the TransGrid 330/132 kV Substation at the TransGrid 330 kV Murray Switching Station, 1.56 kilometres (1.71 mi) South East of Khancoban.

== Location and features ==
Guthega power station is located at the confluence of the Munyang River and the Snowy River, approximately 5.5 kilometres (3.4 mi) downstream of the Guthega Dam wall. It is a conventional hydroelectric power station, situated above ground. The waters held in the reservoir behind Guthega dam pass through a concrete lined tunnel, a surge tank and firstly one, then two steel penstocks to the power station to generate electricity.

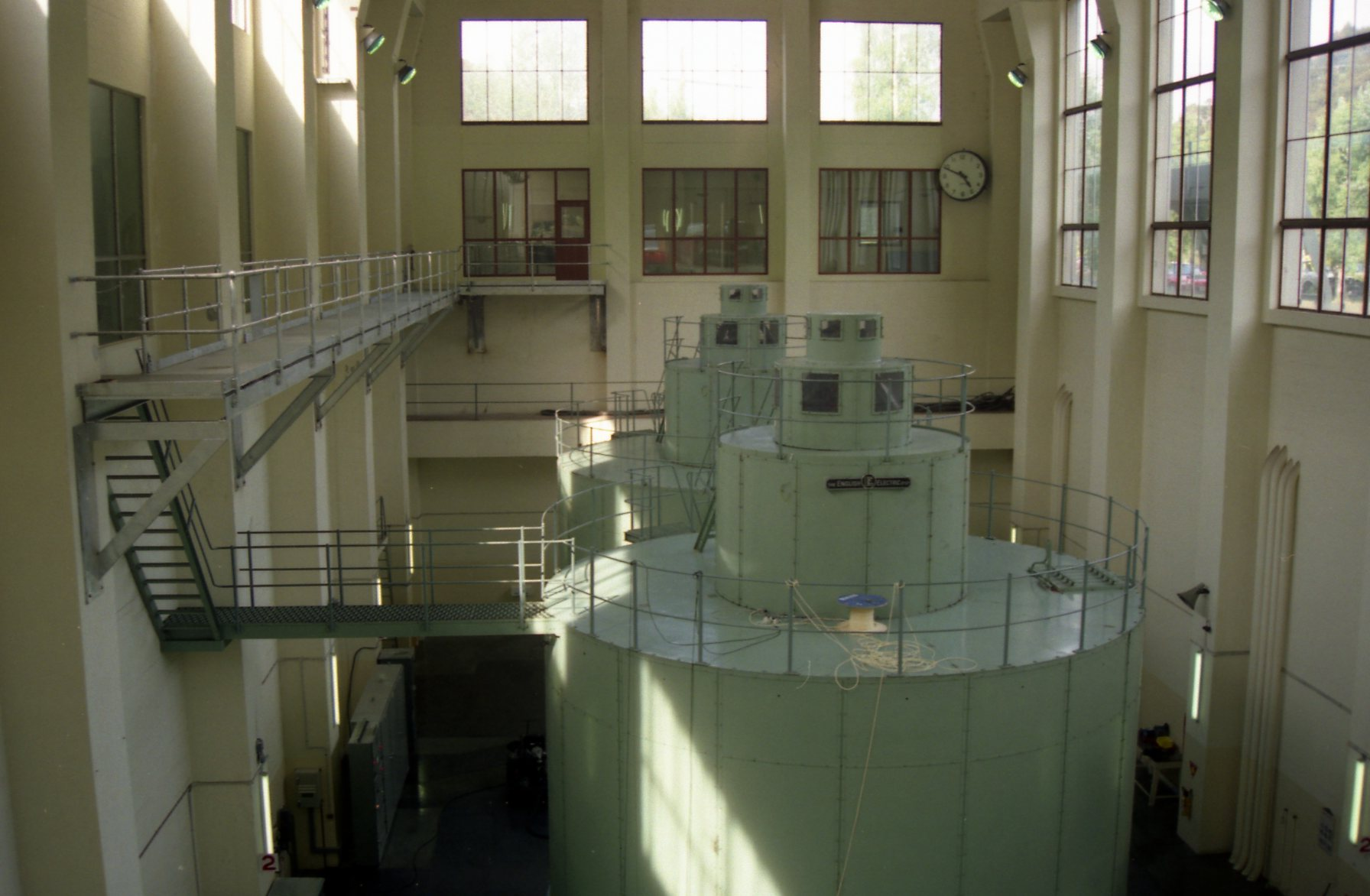
Inside the machine hall - English Electric generators as they appeared in 1982

The powerhouse is a concrete structure with a machine hall that is 51.46 metres (168.8 ft) long, 17.83 metres (58.5 ft) wide, and 32.61 metres (107.0 ft) high. Approximately 6,880 cubic metres (243,000 cu ft) of concrete was used in its construction which commenced in November 1951 and was completed in April 1955.

The power station has two Francis turbines each driving an English Electric generator. The power station includes foundations for a third unit but this was never installed as there was insufficient water to make it worthwhile. The power station has a rated hydraulic head of 246.9 metres (810 ft). Each turbine runs at 428 rpm and water flows through it at the rate of 28.3 cubic metres per second (1,000 cu ft/s). The total installed generating capacity is 60 megawatts (80,000 hp) of electricity yielding a net generation of 172 gigawatt-hours (620 TJ) annually.

The Guthega Power Station is the highest power station in Australia.

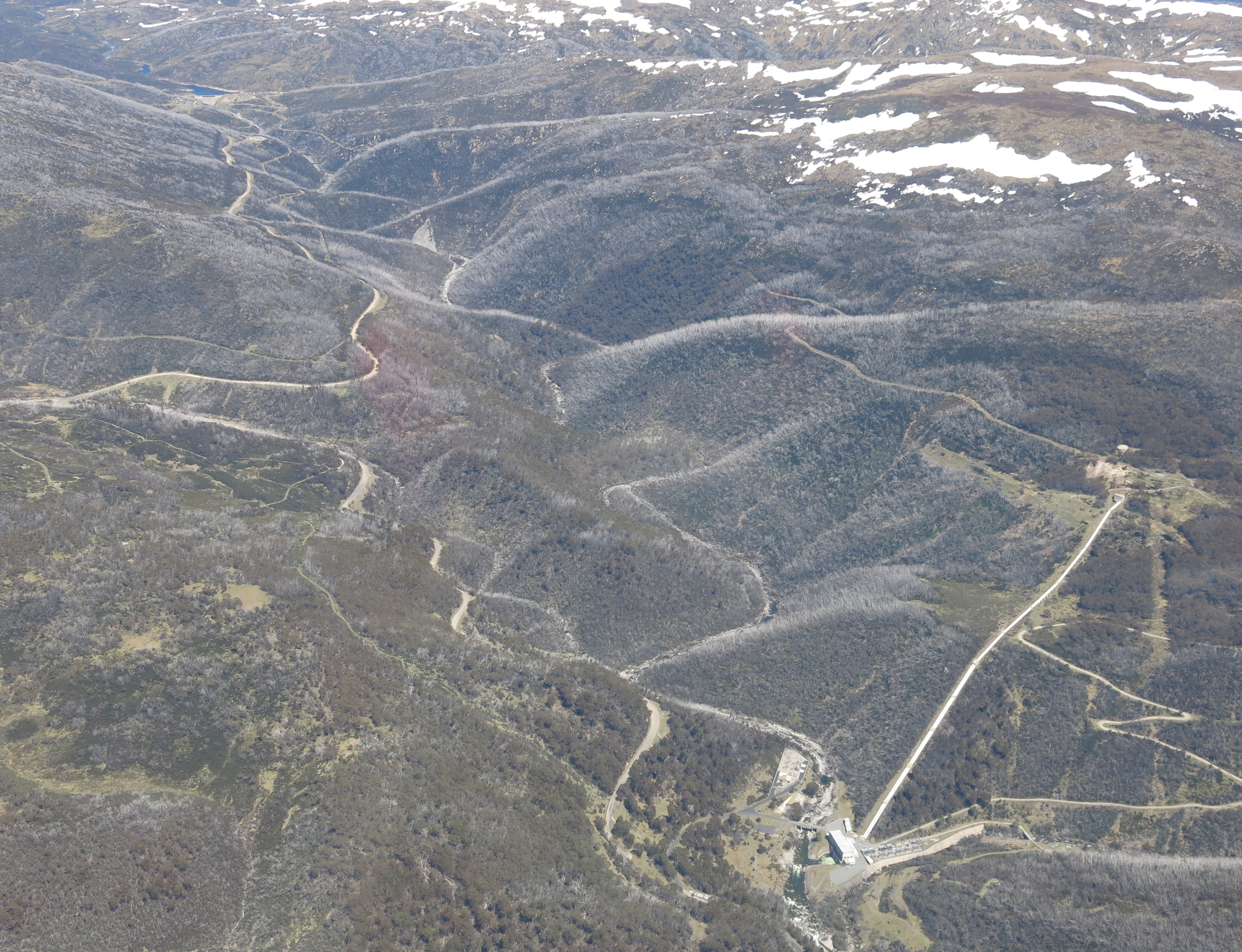
Guthega power station and dam

== See also ==
- Guthega, New South Wales
- Snowy Mountains Scheme
- Snowy Hydro Limited
