= Ramshead Range =

Mountain range in Australia

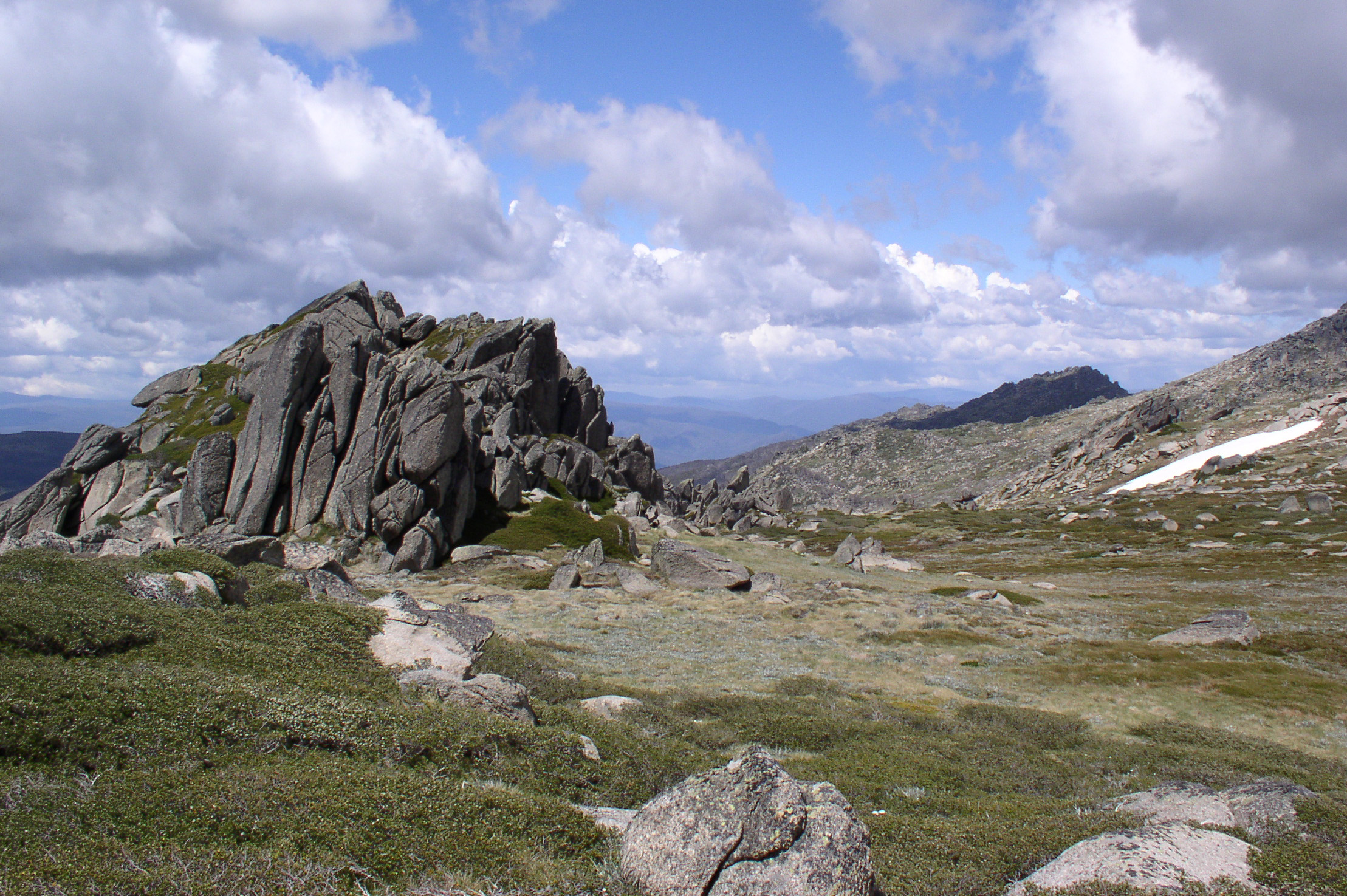
- Part of the Ramshead Range in summer

Highest point
- Peak: Mount Twynam
- Elevation: 2,178 m (7,146 ft); AHD
- Coordinates: 36°23′S 148°19′E

Geography
- Location within New South Wales
- Country: Australia
- States: New South Wales; Victoria
- Regions: Monaro; Victorian Alps
- Range coordinates: 36°31′5″S 148°14′24″E

The Ramshead Range, a mountain range that is part of the Snowy Mountains, is located in the Monaro region of New South Wales and the Alpine region of Victoria, Australia.

== Location and features ==
The range extends from the southwest near Mount Cobberas No. 1 in Victoria, across the Black-Allen Line that defines the straight line border between the two states, towards the northeast near Thredbo in New South Wales.

The peaks of the range are around 2,100 metres (6,900 ft) AHD, with Mount Twynam, at an elevation of 2,195 metres (7,201 ft) AHD, the highest peak. The number of peaks in the Ramshead Range is debatable: however it is commonly accepted that the South Ramshead, the Rams Head and the North Ramshead are all proper peaks. The peak between Rams Head and North Ramshead is sometimes known as the 'Central' Ramshead.

The range is generally covered in snow from June through to October, making it suitable for cross-country skiing. The range is most commonly accessed from Dead Horse Gap or by the Kosciuszko Express Quad Chair at Thredbo, and is not far south of Mount Kosciuszko, the highest mainland point in Australia.
