= Móric Pogány =

Hungarian architect

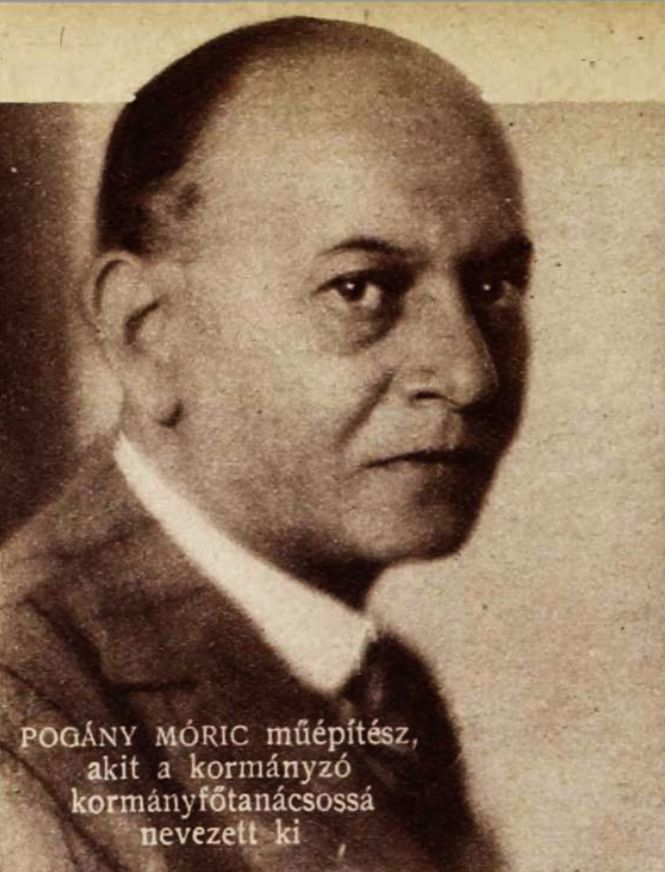

Móric Pogány (1878–1942) was a Hungarian Jewish architect.

== Life and works ==
He began his studies at the industrial school in Kolozsvár. He later entered into a social relationship with architect Emil Tőry until his death. He made his name known with the plan of the Princely Tomb on display in the 1900 exhibition of the Art Gallery. He won prizes in the competition of the Vörösmarty, Kossuth and War of Independence statues. It was striking with its crematorium plan. His works planned together with Tőry: the Hungarian house of the 1911 exhibition in Turin, the Erzsébet tér palace of the Adriatic Insurance Institute, etc.

They won the 1st prize and an export commission in the design competition of the National Theater. He designed the 1918 coronation oath in front of the Matthias Church, as well as the Batthyány Eternal Light at the corner of Hold Street. The Hungarian Association of Engineers and Architects won the Ybl medal and the big gold medal, as well as the gold medal of the Leipzig and other foreign exhibitions.
