= Mount Kosciuszko =

Highest mountain in mainland Australia

- Polish: Góra Kościuszki; Ngarigu: Tar-gan-gil/Kunama Namadgi
- Mount Kosciuszko viewed from the Scammel Spur lookout

Highest point
- Elevation: 2,228 m (7,310 ft)
- Prominence: 2,228 m (7,310 ft)
- Isolation: 1,894.26 km (1,177.04 mi)
- Listing: Country high point; Ultra
- Coordinates: 36°27′21″S 148°15′49″E

Geography
- Location within New South Wales Location within Victoria Location within Australia
- Location: Snowy Mountains, New South Wales, Australia
- Parent range: Main Range, Great Dividing Range
- Topo map: Perisher Valley

Climbing
- Easiest route: Walk (dirt road)

Mount Kosciuszko (/ˌkɒziˈʌskoʊ/ KOZ-ee-USK-oh; Polish pronunciation: [kɔɕˈt͡ɕuʂ.kɔ] kosh-CHOOSH-koh; Polish: Góra Kościuszki; Ngarigu: Kunama Namadgi) is the highest mountain of mainland Australia, at 2,228 metres (7,310 ft) above sea level. It is located on the Main Range of the Snowy Mountains in Kosciuszko National Park, a part of the Australian Alps National Parks and Reserves, in New South Wales, and is located west of Crackenback and close to Jindabyne, near the border with Victoria. Mount Kosciuszko is ranked 35th by topographic isolation.

== Etymology and charting ==
The mountain was named by the Polish explorer Paweł (Paul) Edmund Strzelecki in 1840, in honour of Tadeusz Kościuszko, a general of the Kościuszko Uprising and American Revolutionary War, because of its perceived resemblance to the Kościuszko Mound in Kraków, Poland. An exploration party led by Strzelecki and James Macarthur beside him with Indigenous guides Charley Tarra and Jackey set off on what is called Strzelecki's Southern expedition. Macarthur was seeking new pastures. Strzelecki wanted to investigate the climate, geology, paleontology and geography of NSW and to publish his findings. This included identifying Australia's highest summit, which Strzelecki reached on 12 March 1840.

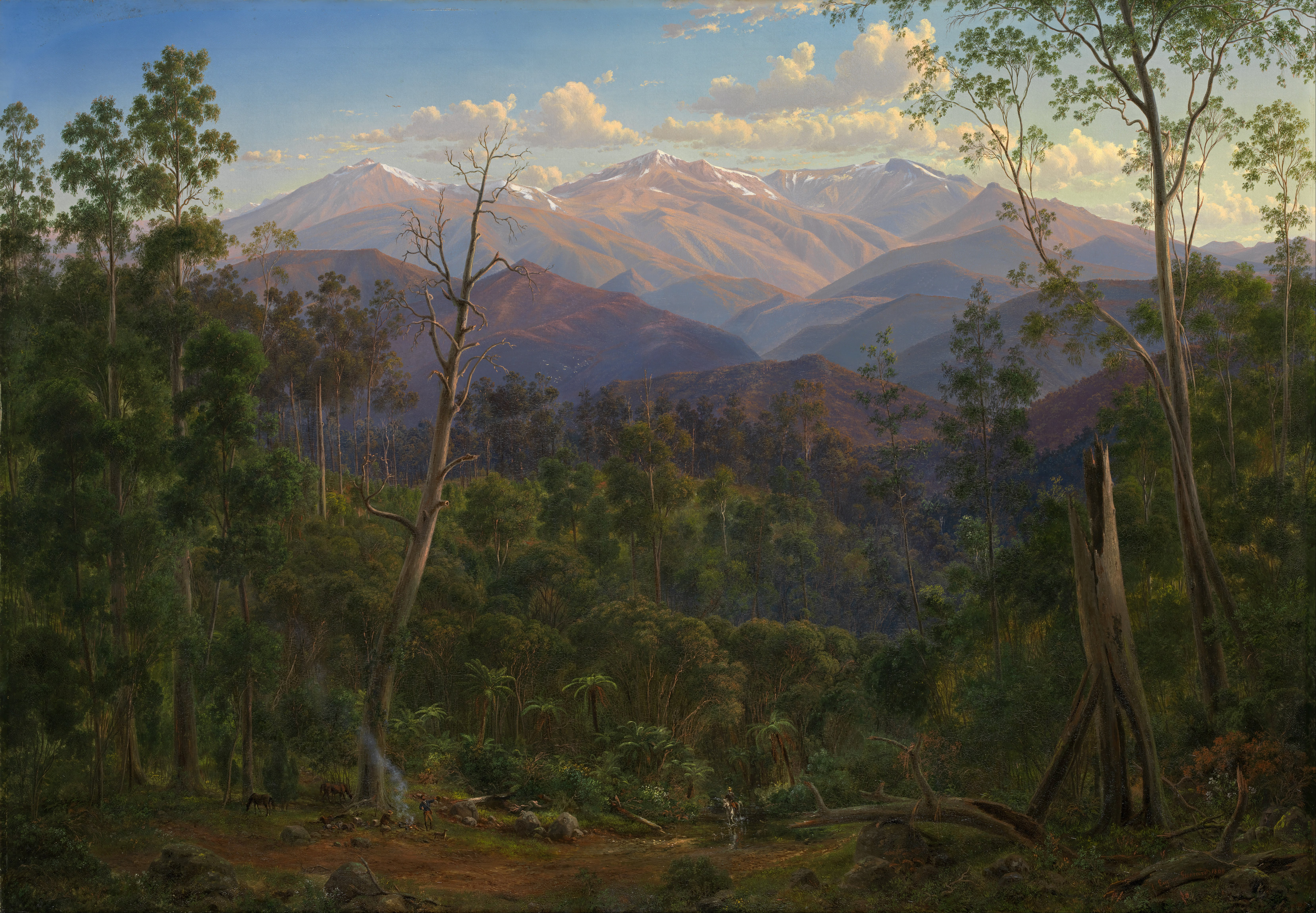
Mount Kosciusko, seen from the Victorian border (Mount Hope Ranges)—the mountain range as depicted by Eugene von Guerard, 1866

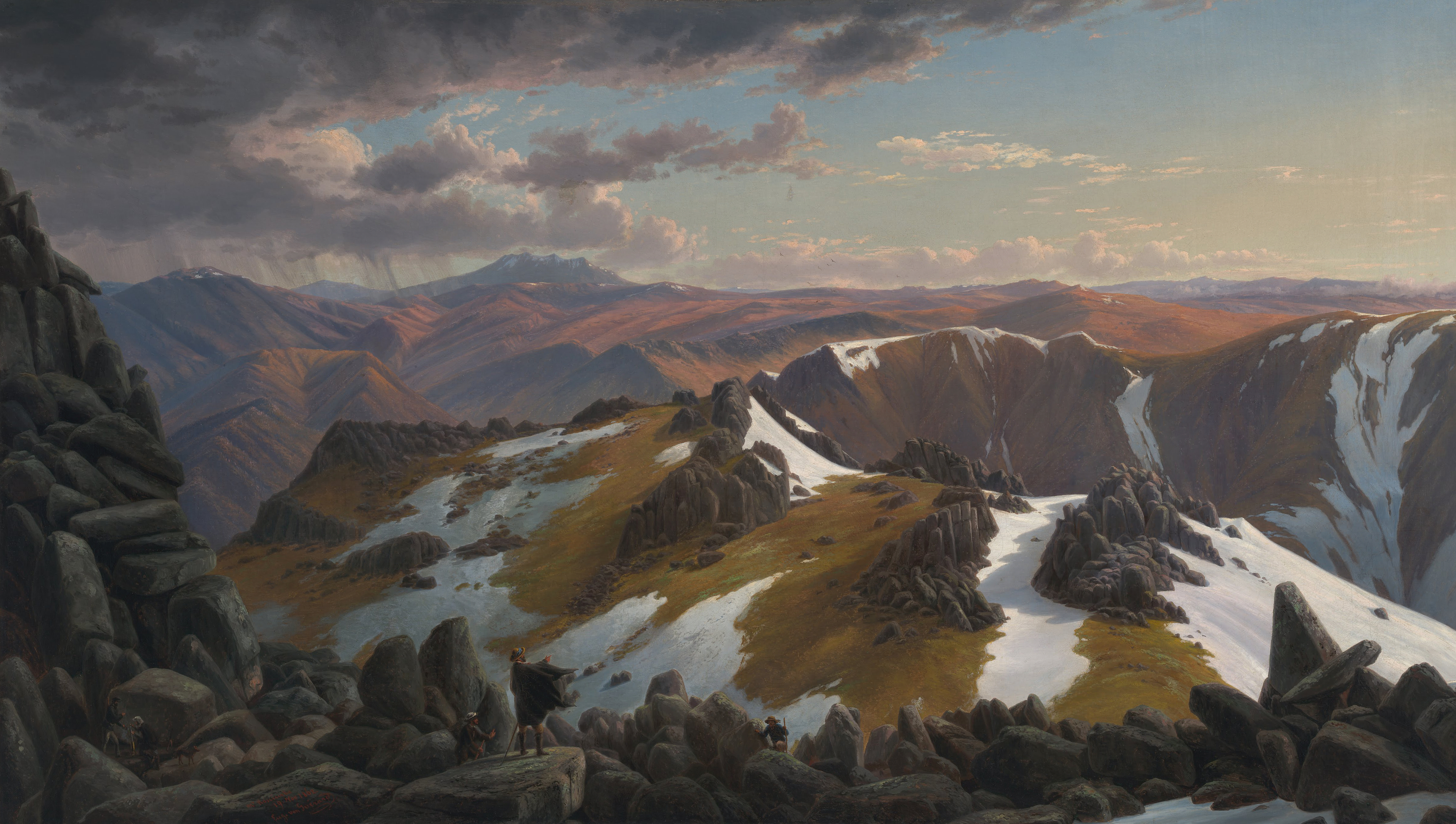
North-east view from the northern top of Mount Kosciusko—Eugene von Guerard, 1863

The approach was made from Geehi Valley. After climbing Hannel's Spur, the peak now named Mount Townsend was reached. Here Strzelecki used his instruments to make observations. Mt Townsend is Australia's second highest mountain, adjacent to and almost the same height as Mount Kosciuszko, and Strzelecki saw that the neighbouring peak was slightly higher. In the presence of Macarthur he named the higher summit Mount Kosciusko after the Polish-Lithuanian military leader who died in 1817. As it was late, Macarthur decided to return to camp and Strzelecki alone climbed the Kosciuszko summit. Based on Strzelecki's records, Australia's highest summit was mapped. A cartographical mistake made in an edition of Victorian maps transposed Mount Kosciusko to the position of the present Mount Townsend. Later editions of the map continued to show the original location. NSW maps did not make this mistake. The Victorian error created confusion. In 1885, Austrian explorer Robert von Lendenfeld, guided by James M. Spencer, a local pastoralist, aided by a map containing the transposition error, reached Mount Townsend believing it was Mount Kosciusko. According to Spencer, the local Aboriginals called Mount Kosciusko Tar-gan-gil. Like Strzelecki, Lendenfeld also observed that the neighbouring peak was higher. He named it Mount Townsend to honour the surveyor who in 1846 traversed the peak. Lendenfeld claimed he had identified and reached the highest peak of the continent. The NSW Department of Mines discovered Lendenfeld's mistake and assigned the name Mount Townsend to the second-highest mountain of the range. Lendenfeld's announcement created further confusion. When Lendenfeld's mistake was corrected, a popular legend was created that the established names of the two mountains were swapped rather than re-educate the populace of the name of the highest mountain. The confusion was straightened out in 1940 by B. T. Dowd, a cartographer and historian of the NSW Lands Department. His study reaffirmed that the mountain named by Strzelecki as Mount Kosciuszko was indeed, as the NSW maps had always shown, Australia's highest summit. When Macarthur's field book of the historical journey was published in 1941 by C. Daley, it further confirmed Dowd's clarification. This means that Targangil, mentioned in Spencer's 1885 article, was the indigenous name of Mount Townsend, not of Mount Kosciusko. According to A. E. J. Andrews, Mount Kosciuszko had no indigenous name. Detailed analysis of the mountain history can be found in books by H. P. G. Clews and in the cited A. E. J. Andrews' book Kosciusko: The Mountain in History. The name of the mountain was previously spelled "Mount Kosciusko", an Anglicisation, but the spelling "Mount Kosciuszko" was officially adopted in 1997 by the Geographical Names Board of New South Wales. The traditional English pronunciation of Kosciuszko is /ˌkɒziˈʌskoʊ/ KOZ-ee-US-koh, but the pronunciation /kɒˈʃʊʃkoʊ/ kosh-UUSH-koh is now sometimes used, which is substantially closer to the Polish pronunciation [kɔɕˈt͡ɕuʂkɔ] kosh-CHYUUSH-koh.

=== Aboriginal names ===
There are several native Aboriginal (Ngarigo) names associated with Mount Townsend, where J. Macarthur recorded in 1840 some campings of the natives. There is some confusion as to the exact sounds. These are Jagungal, Jar-gan-gil, Tar-gan-gil, Tackingal; however, all of them mean bogong moth, which aestivate on the mountain. In 2019, "Kunama Namadgi" was submitted to the Geographical Names Board of New South Wales as a proposed dual name for Mount Kosciuszko. The proposal was submitted by the Toomaroombah Kunama Namadgi Indigenous Corporation, which states that the proposed name means "snow" and "mountain". According to Uncle John Casey, the mountain's Ngarigo name has "been Kunama Namadgi for 4,000 years, since we've been on country, until the white man came in the early 1800s and that's when they changed it". However, Iris White, the chairperson of the Southern Kosciuszko Executive Advisory Committee, disputed that account, stating "that name is not from our language. It's offensive because in some of our languages 'Kunama' actually means faeces". White said that a new name should not be given "just for the sake of it sounding Aboriginal or sounding good".

== Geography ==
The mountain was formed by geologic uplift. It was not formed by any recent volcanic activity. Eroded granite intrusions remain at the summit as large boulders above the more heavily eroded sedimentary rocks. Plant species found in the mountain include:

- Kosciuszko buttercup (Ranunculus anemoneus)
- Vickery's grass (Rytidosperma vickeryae)
- Phebalium (Nematalolepis ovatifolia)
- Billy buttons (Craspedia spp.)
- Snow gum

== Reaching the summit ==
Mount Kosciuszko is the highest summit in mainland Australia. Until 1977 it was possible to drive from Charlotte Pass to within a few metres of the summit, but in 1977 the road was closed to public motor vehicle access due to environmental concerns. The road is open from Charlotte Pass for walkers and cyclists for 7.6 kilometres (5 mi) to Rawson Pass, at an elevation of 2,100 metres (6,900 ft) above sea level. From there a 1.4-kilometre (1 mi) walking path leads to the summit. The peak may also be approached from Thredbo, taking 3 to 3.5 hours for a round trip. This walk starts from the top of the Thredbo Kosciuszko Express chairlift, which operates all year-round. The walking path is popular in summer, and is a mesh walkway to protect the native vegetation and prevent erosion. It is 5 kilometres (3.1 mi) to Rawson Pass, where it meets the track from Charlotte Pass, and from where it is a further 1.4 kilometres (0.87 mi) to the summit. The walk to the summit is the easiest of all the Seven Summits. Australia's highest public toilet was built at Rawson pass in 2007, to cope with the more than 100,000 people visiting the mountain each summer. A third route up Mount Kosciuszko is up the Hannel's Spur Track (15.5 km or 9.6 mi), which approaches from the NW and is the only route to pass through the Western Fall Wilderness Zone – passing through four different bio-diversity bands along the ascent. The Hannel's Spur Track is officially Australia's biggest vertical ascent of 1,800 m (5,900 ft). This is the same route that explorer Paul Strzelecki climbed and discovered Kosciuszko in 1840 and also the same annual route that stockmen once brought cattle up and down from the valley almost 2 km (1.2 mi) below to graze in the alpine meadows throughout the summer. The various Aboriginal tribes from the Murray valley also used this same route annually for millennia to access Kosciuszko to harvest bogong moths that were abundant throughout the summer months and to socialise with other tribes from the coast and northern plains. The Hannel's Spur Track trailhead (sign) is about a 1.4-kilometre (0.87 mi) hike SSE of the Geehi Rest Area on the Alpine Way road between the towns of Thredbo and Khancoban. The peak and the surrounding areas are snow-covered in winter and spring (usually beginning in June and continuing until October or later). The road from Charlotte Pass is marked by snow poles and provides a guide for cross-country skiers, and the track from Thredbo is easily followed until covered by snow in winter.

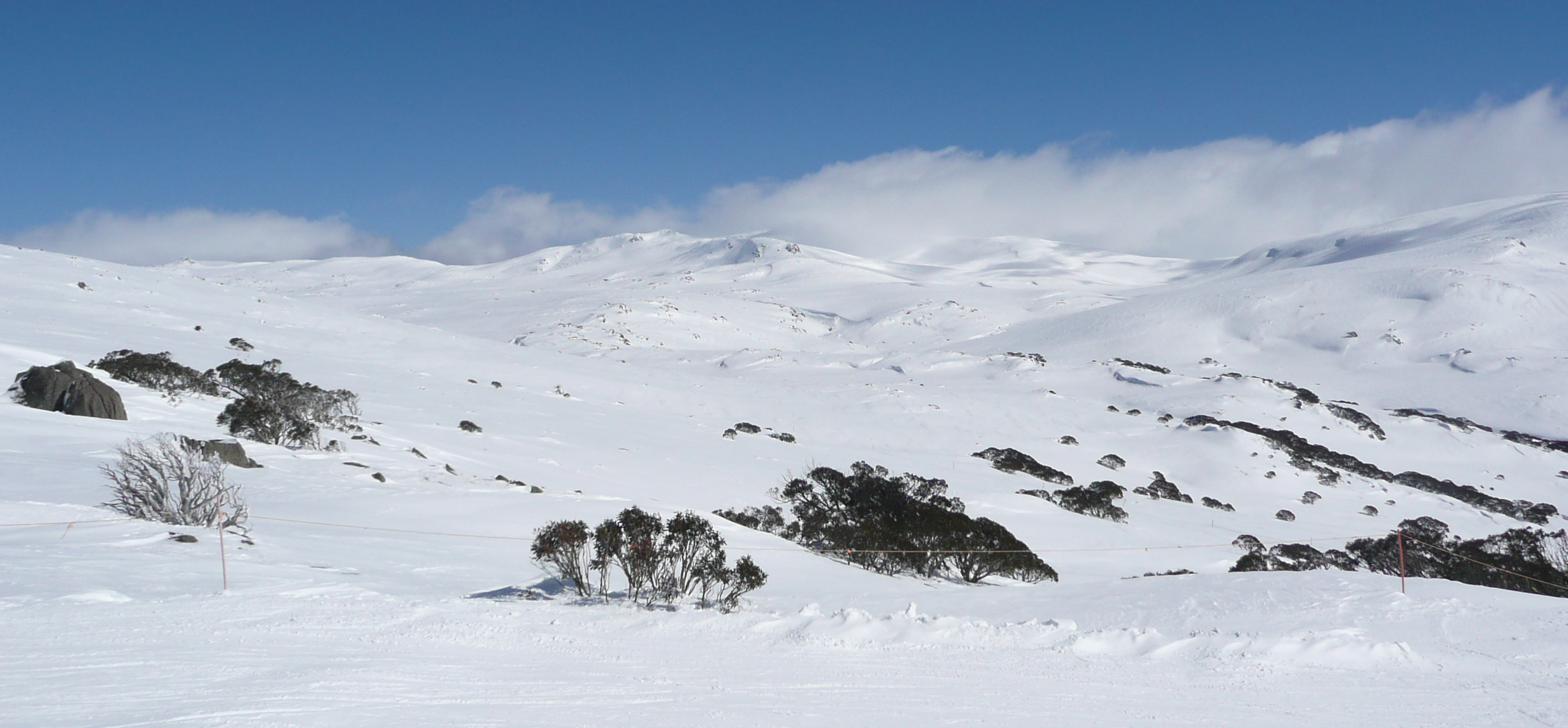

| 1 | North Ramshead |
| 2 | Kosciuszko summit, obscured by clouds |
| 3 | Etheridge Range |

| 4 | Mount Clarke (Mount Townsend is behind it) |
| 5 | Kangaroo Ridge |
| 6 | Snowy River headwaters |

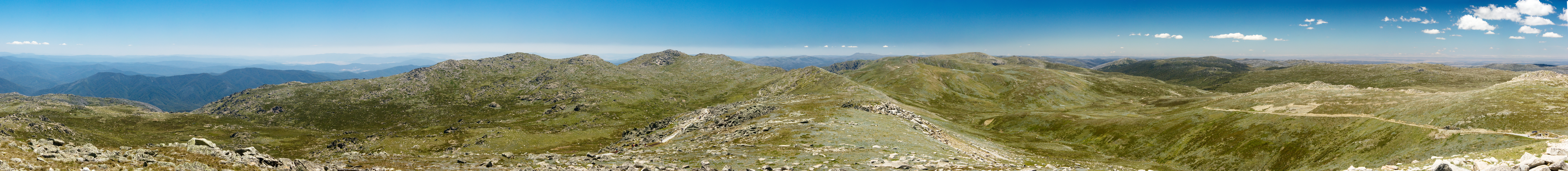
Looking north from the summit towards Mount Townsend

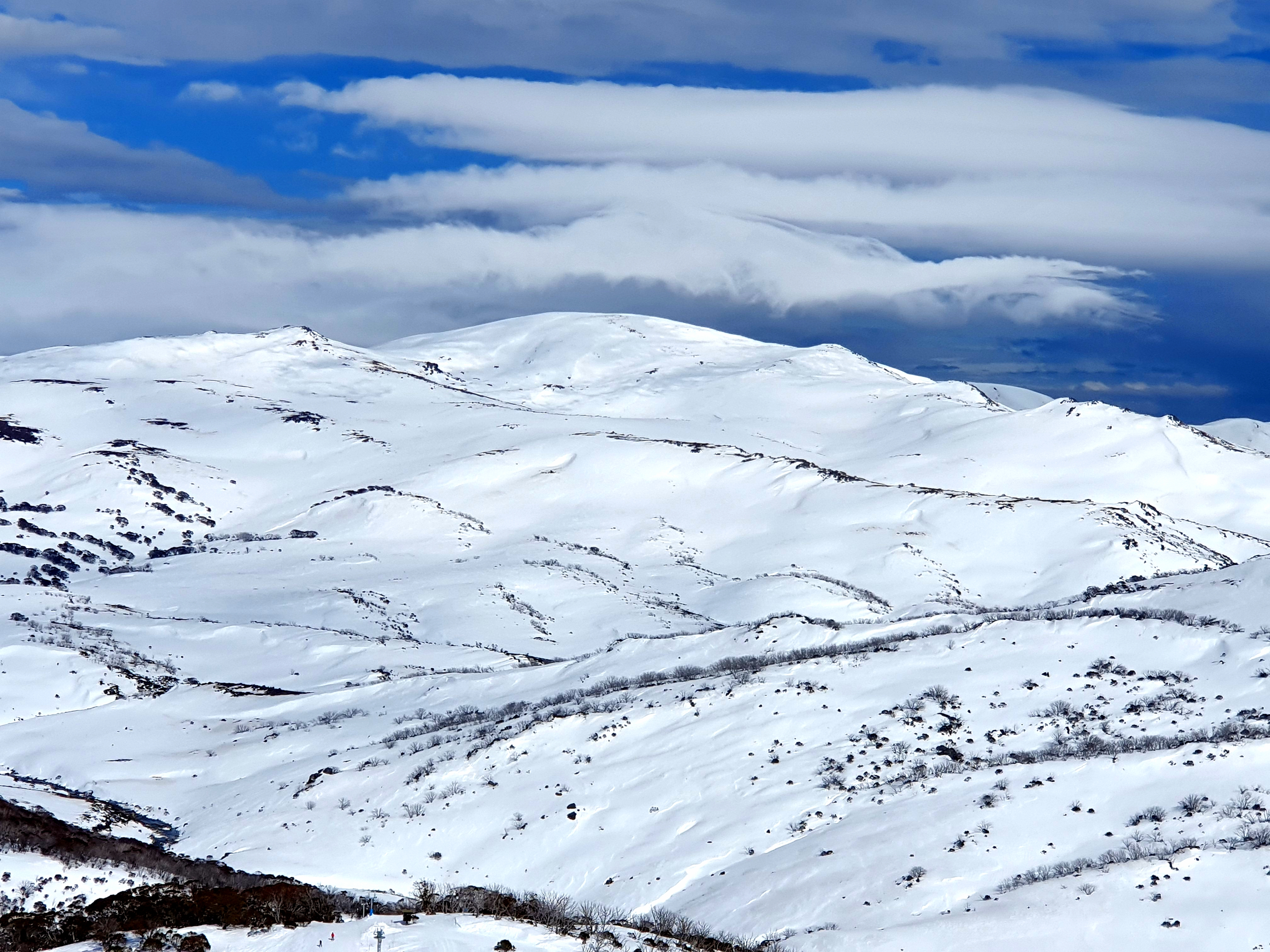
Mount Kosciuszko with snow, viewed from Guthega Peak

=== Recreation ===
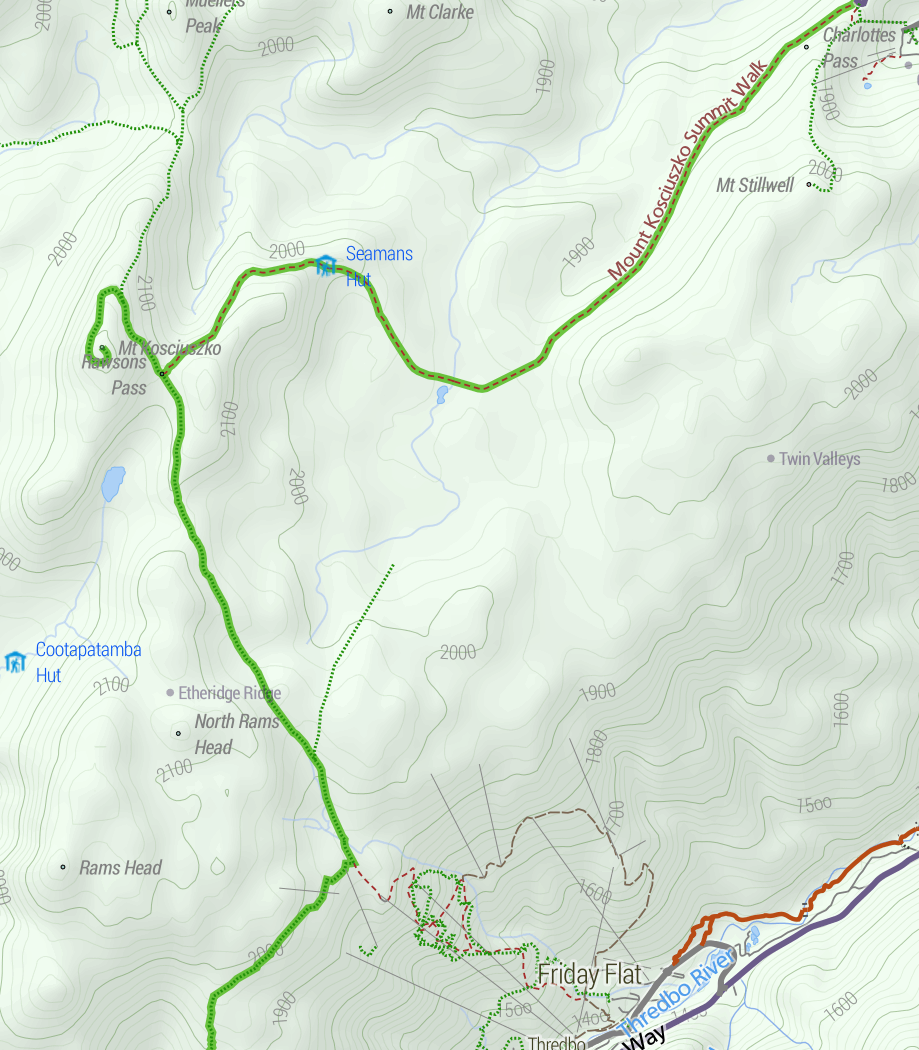
Topographic map of Mount Kosciuszko including the approaches from Charlotte Pass and Thredbo.

Kosciuszko National Park is also the location of the downhill ski slopes closest to Canberra and Sydney, containing the Thredbo, Charlotte Pass, and Perisher ski resorts. Mount Kosciuszko may have been ascended by Indigenous Australians long before the first recorded ascent by Europeans. Each year in December, an ultramarathon running race called the Coast to Kosciuszko ascends to the top of Mount Kosciuszko after starting at the coast 240 kilometres (150 mi) away.

== Higher Australian mountains ==
Higher peaks exist within territory administered or claimed by Australia: outside the continent are Mawson Peak (2,745 m or 9,006 ft) on Heard Island as well as Dome Argus (4,030 m or 13,220 ft), Mount McClintock (3,490 m or 11,450 ft) and Mount Menzies (3,355 m or 11,007 ft) in the Australian Antarctic Territory. Historically, part of the island of New Guinea was administered by Australia from 1914 until 1975, including Mount Wilhelm (4,509 m or 14,793 ft), now the highest mountain in Papua New Guinea. On the Indonesian side of the border, Puncak Jaya, which stands at 4,884 m or 16,024 ft, is the highest mountain in the Australian continent as well as Oceania. Because of this, and due to the easy ascent of Kosciuszko, Jaya is normally the goal for climbers attempting the Seven Summits challenge.

== In popular culture ==
The 1863 picture by Eugene von Guerard hanging in the National Gallery of Australia titled Northeast view from the northern top of Mount Kosciusko is actually from Mount Townsend. In the poem by Banjo Paterson, The Man From Snowy River is said to hail from "up by Kosciusko's side". Australian rock band Midnight Oil recorded a song called "Kosciusko" on its 1984 album Red Sails in the Sunset, referring to the mountain. The spelling was updated to "Kosciuszko" for the group's 1997 compilation album, 20,000 Watt R.S.L. A species of lizard, Eulamprus kosciuskoi, is named after Mount Kosciuszko. The mountain top was the finish line on the fifth season of The Amazing Race Australia.

== Gallery ==
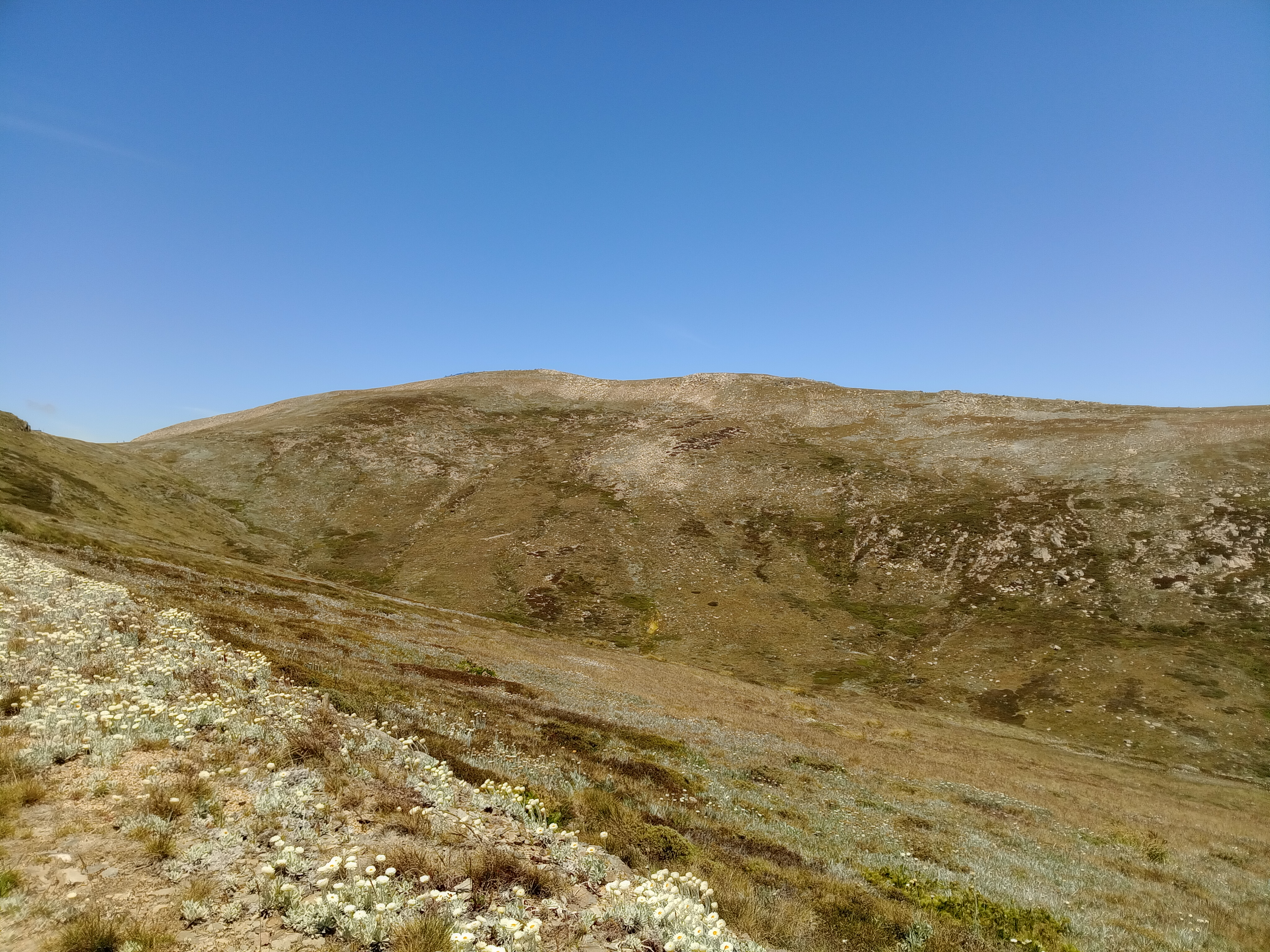
Mount Kosciuszko pictured in summer, without snow

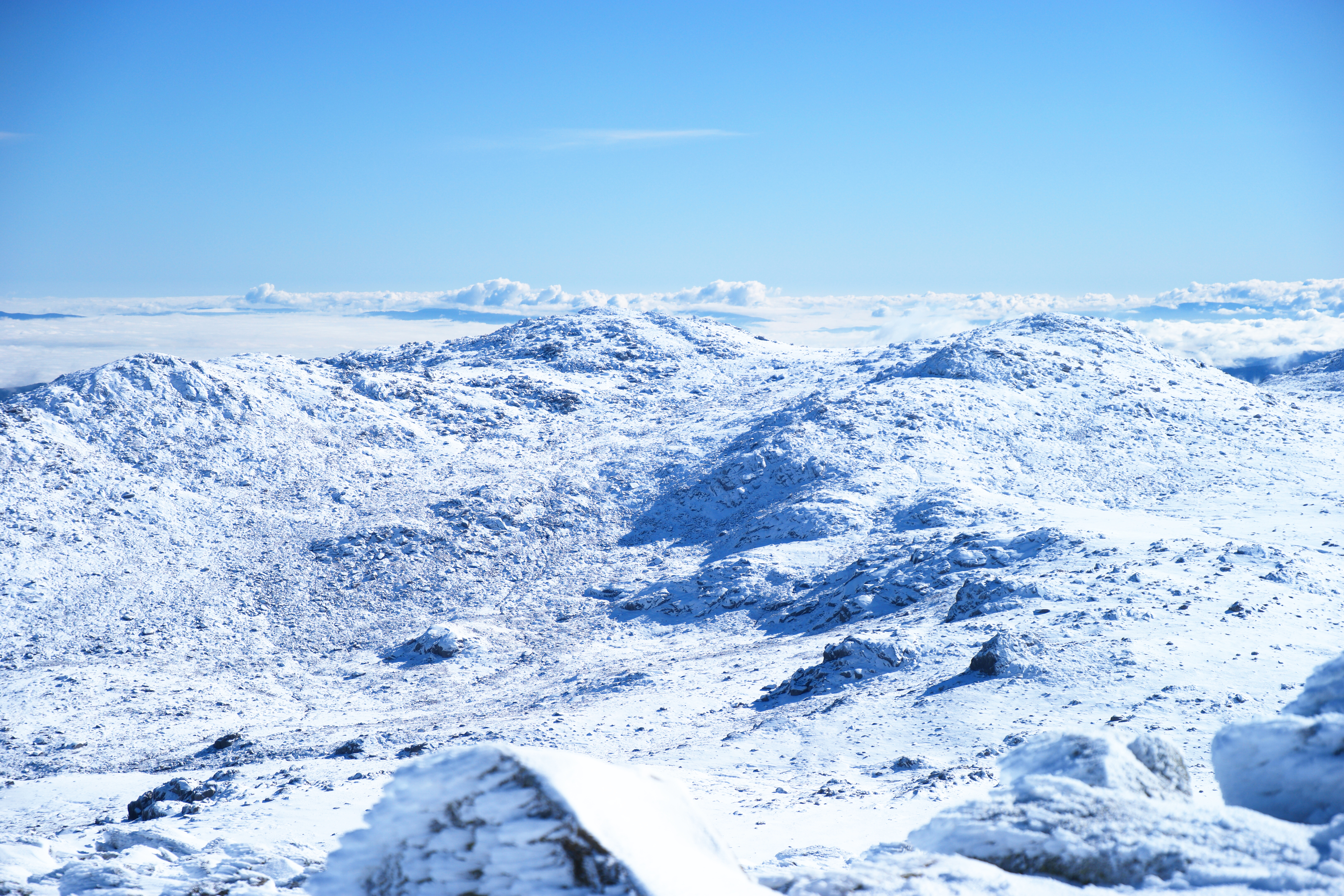
Kosciuszko National Park as viewed from the summit

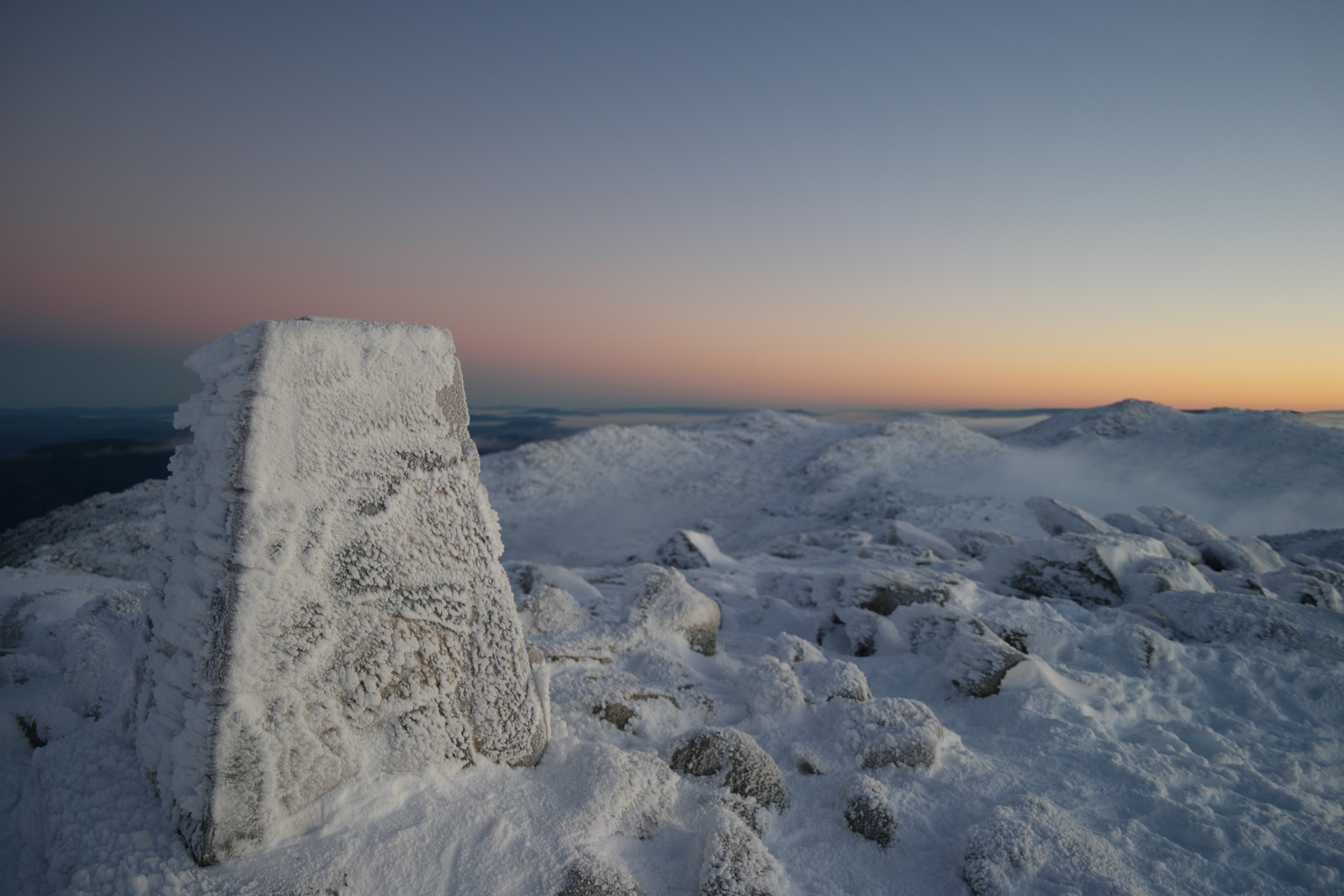
The base of a survey trig marker at the summit

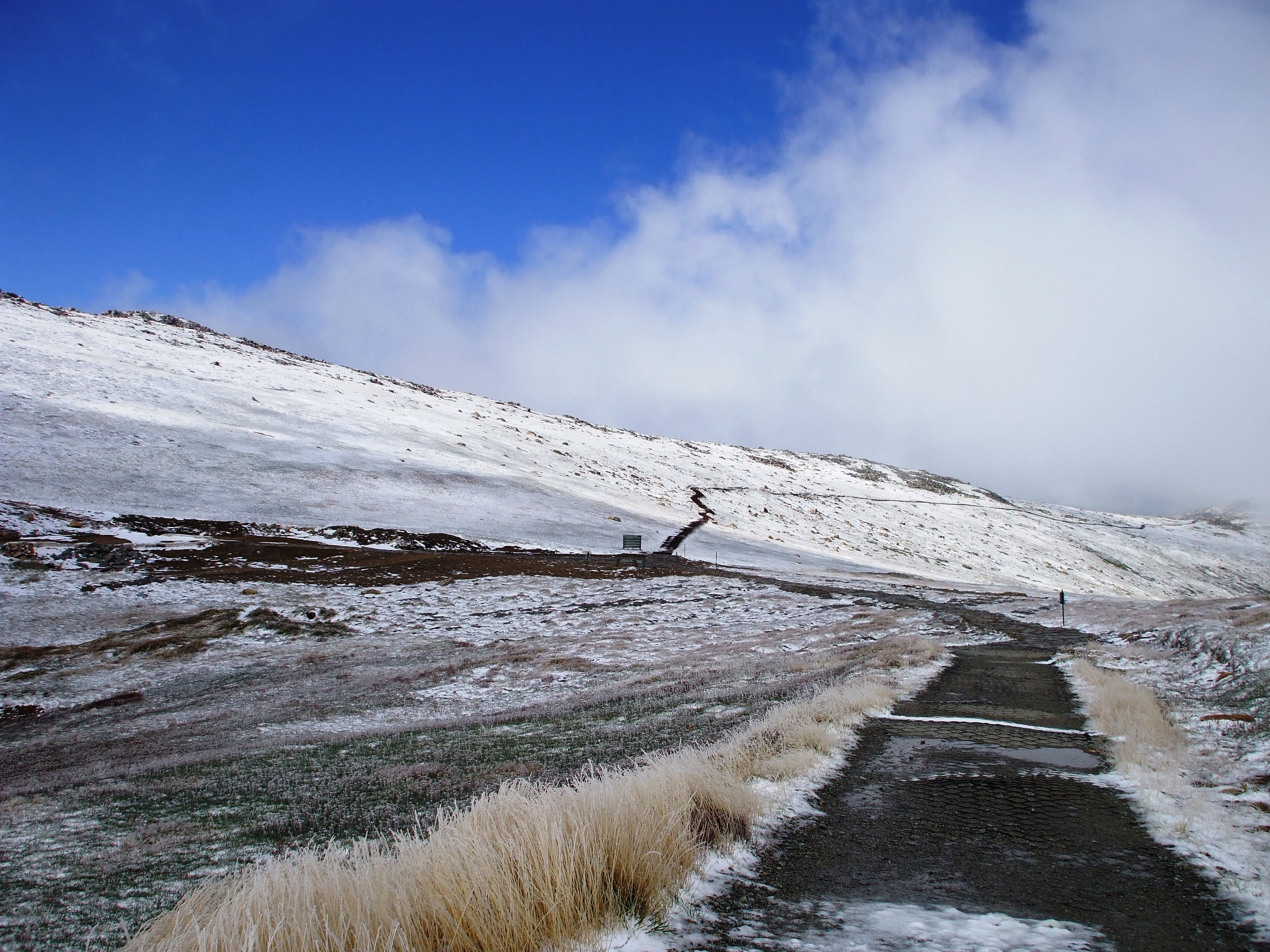
East side of the mountain

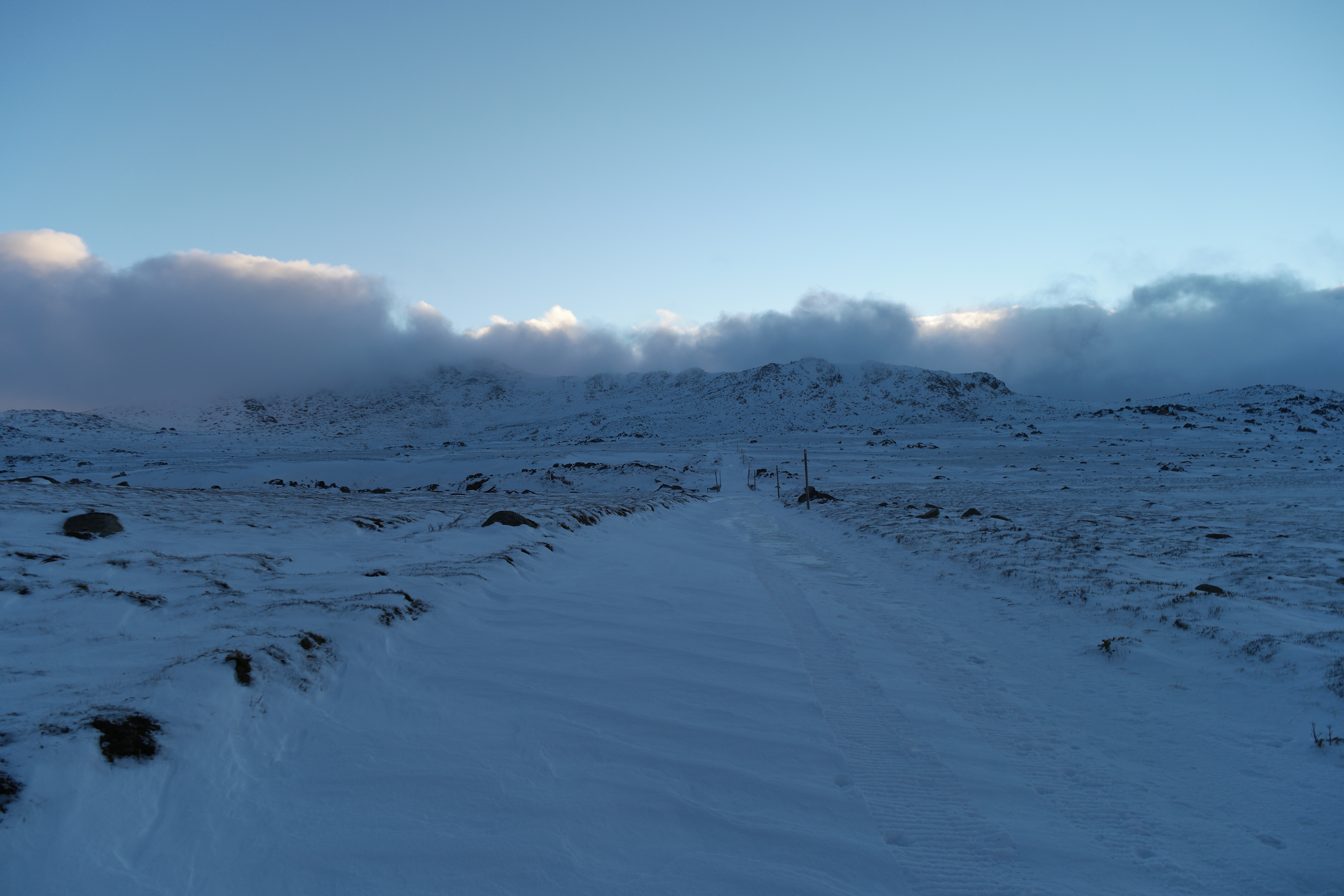
Mount Kosciuszko Summit walk

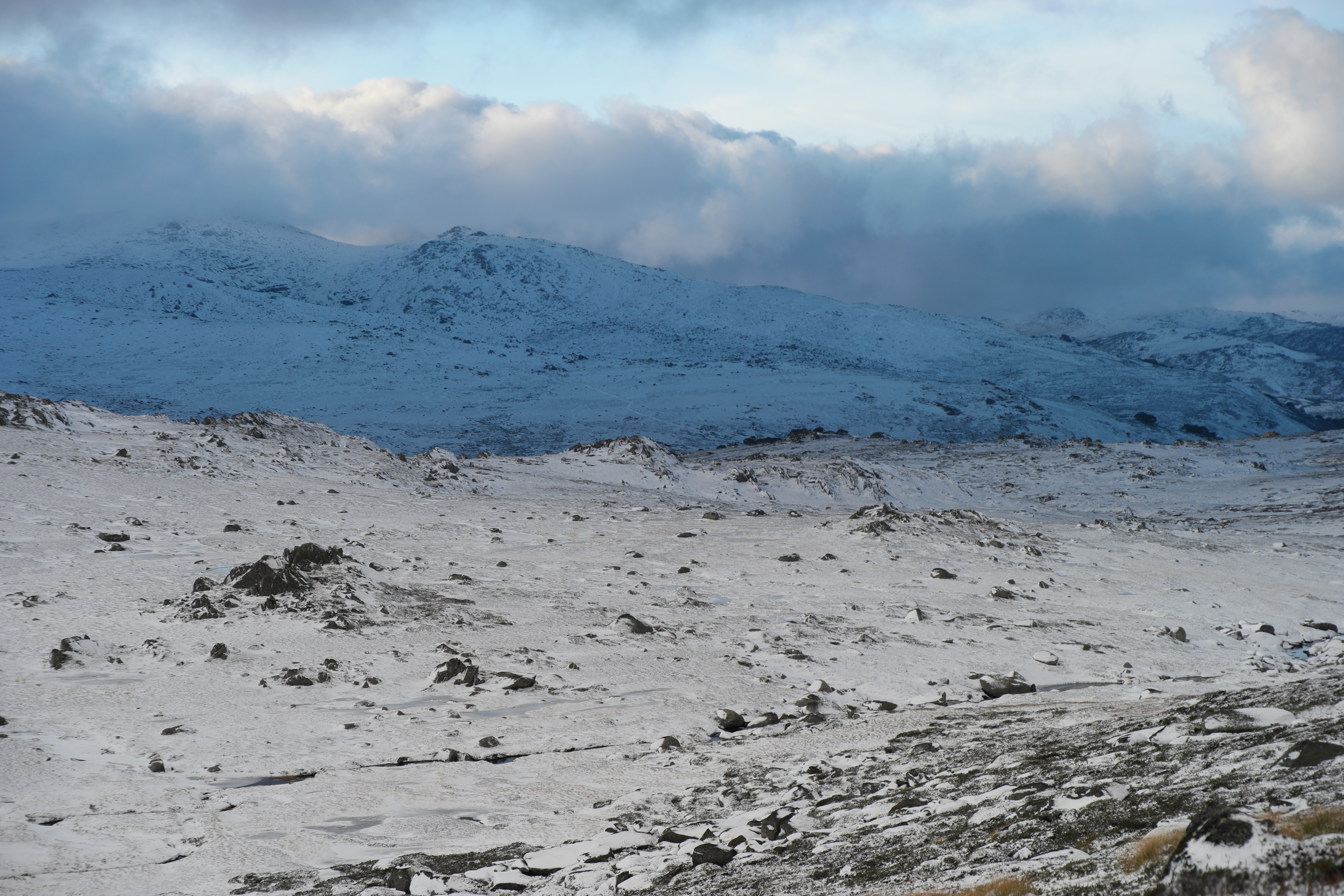
The summit from Charlotte Pass, New South Wales

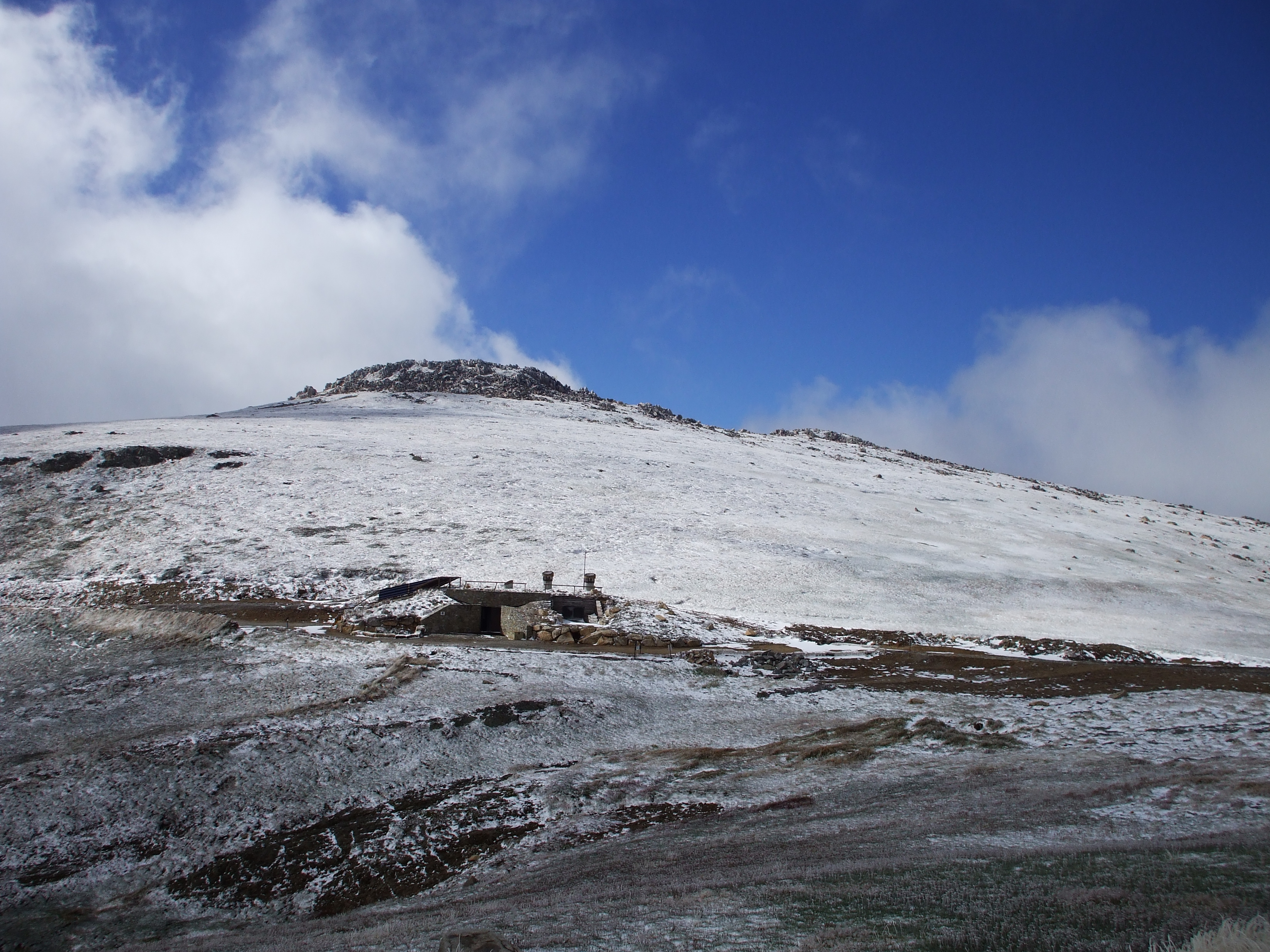
Mount Etheridge from south side showing high elevation toilet at Rawson Pass

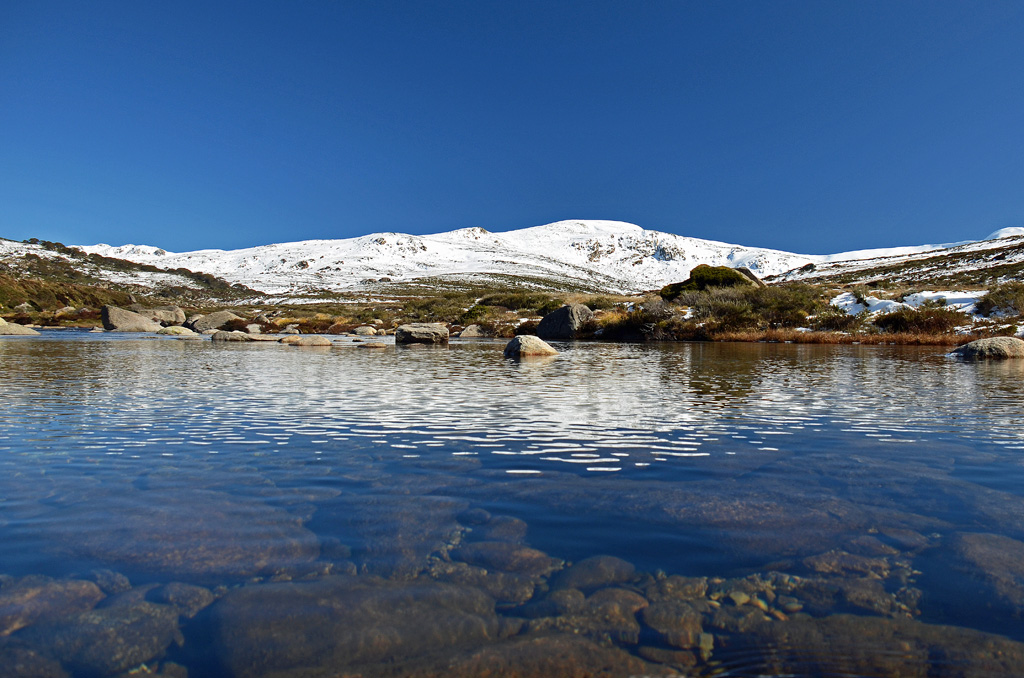
View of Mount Kosciuszko and the Etheridge Range from the headwaters of the Snowy River

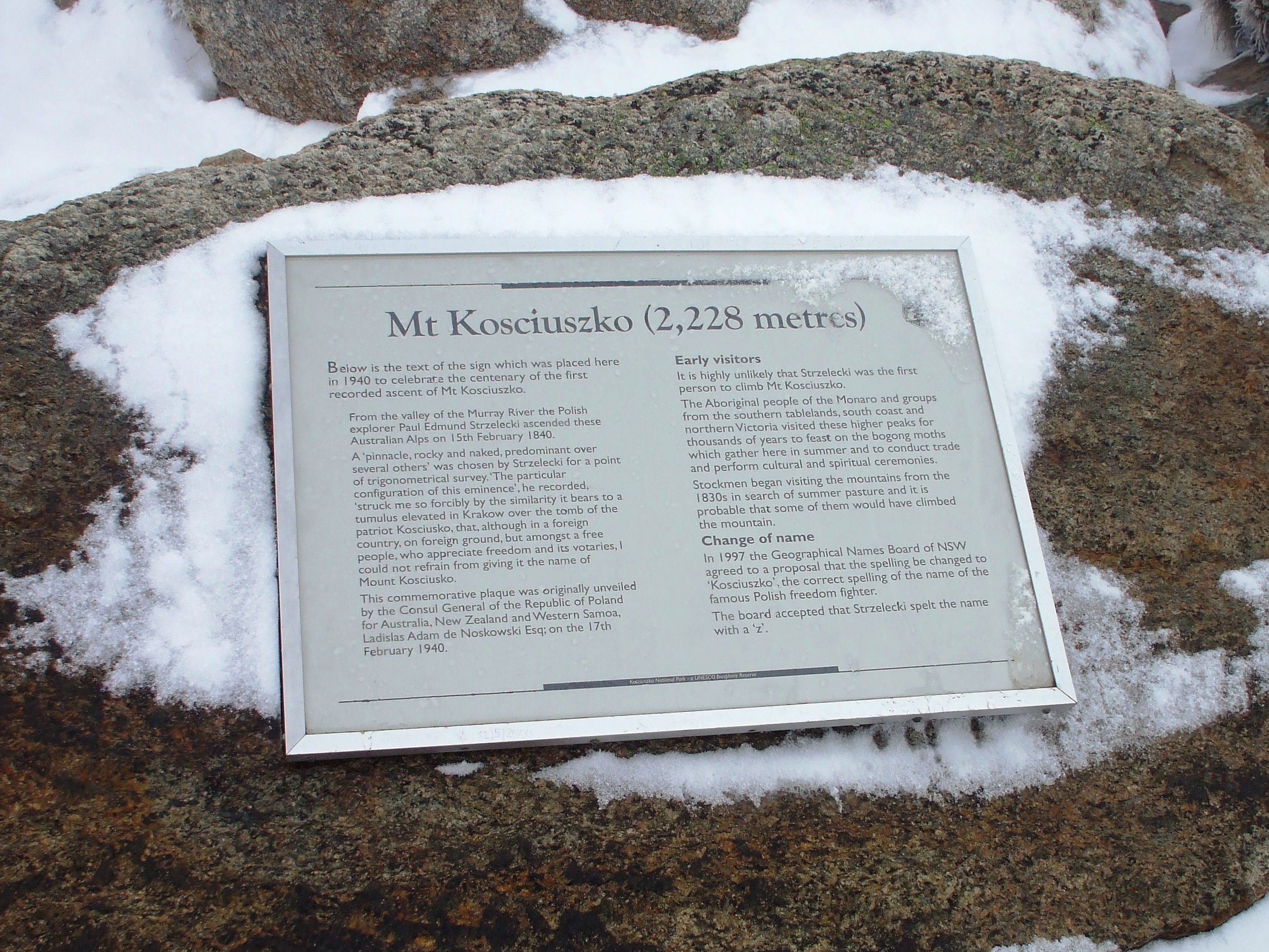
The plate at the top

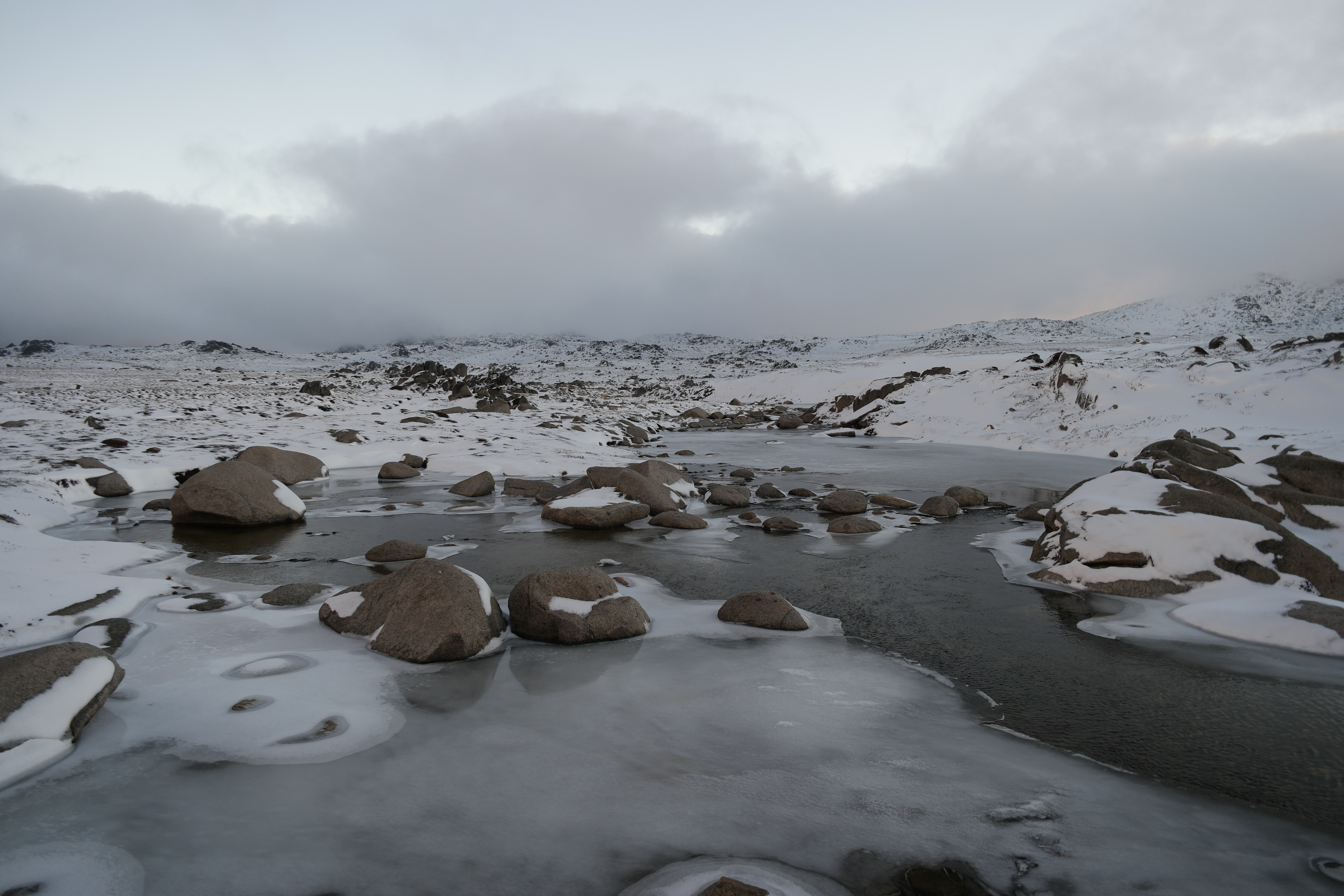
The Snowy River flowing down from the summit.

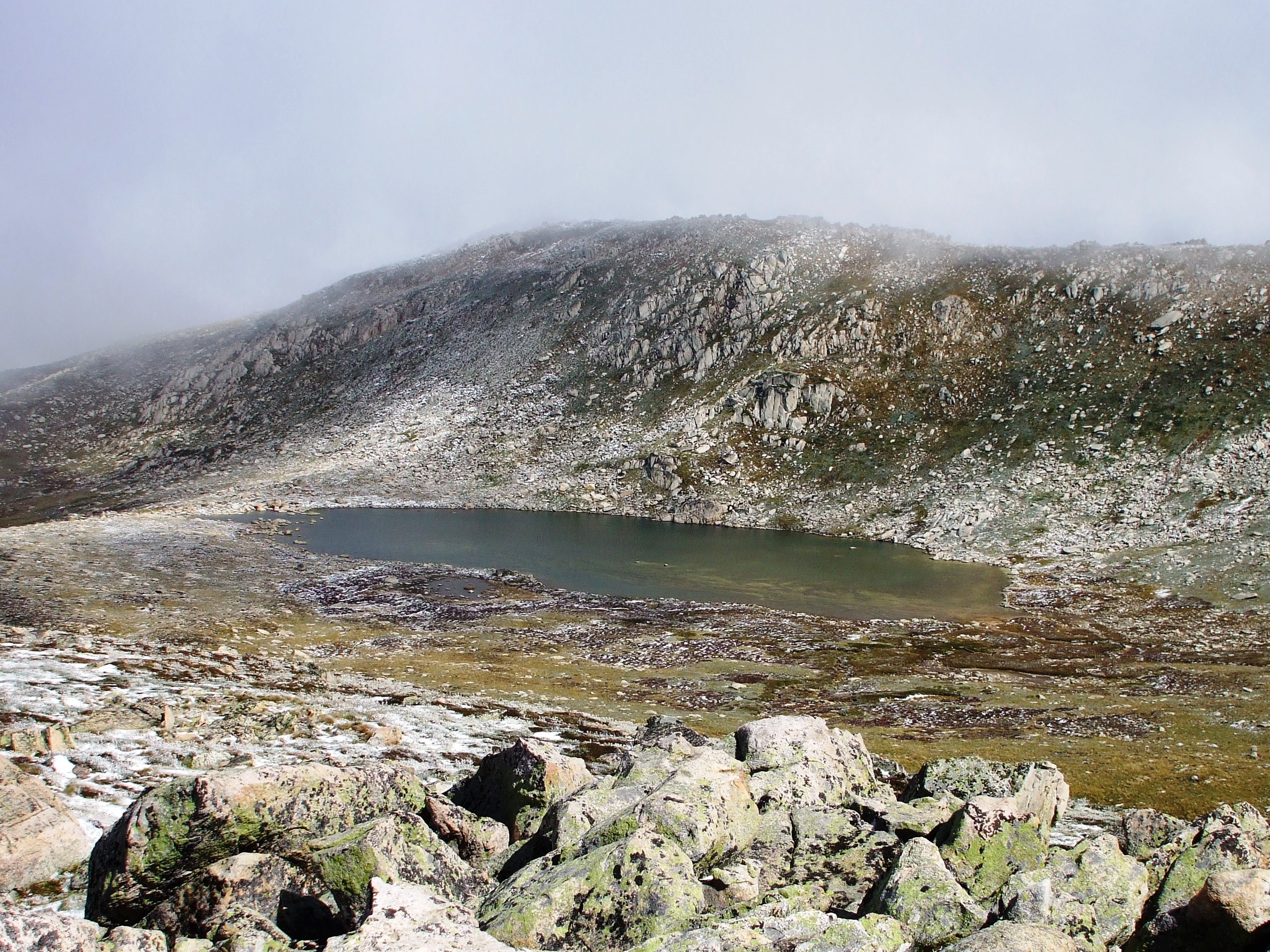
Lake Cootapatamba, the lake on the highest place in the Australian mainland

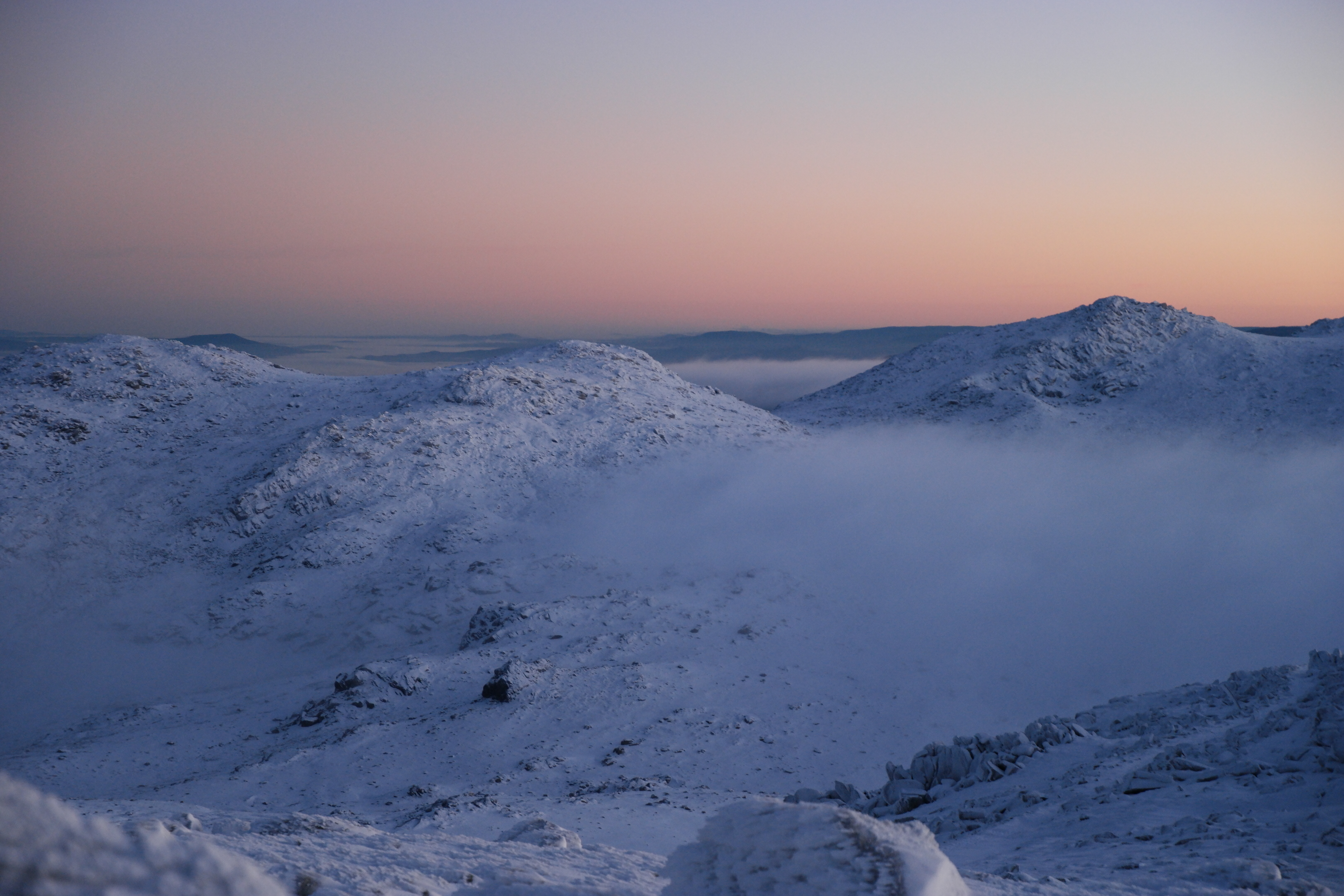
Adjacent mountain ranges

== See also ==
- Australian Alps
- Australian Alps National Parks and Reserves
- List of mountains of Australia

== Sources ==
- Brennan-Mills, Maddison (21 November 2026). "Geography Facts That'll Completely Ruin Every Map You've Ever Trusted". News.com.au. "Mount Kosciuszko, at 2,228 m [7,310 ft], is the highest mountain [...] on the mainland [..., while] Mawson Peak [...] stands 2,745 m [9,006 ft] tall on top of an active volcano called Big Ben on Heard Island, an Australian territory about 4,100 km [2,500 mi] southwest of Perth."
