= Main Range (Snowy Mountains) =

The Main Range of the Snowy Mountains
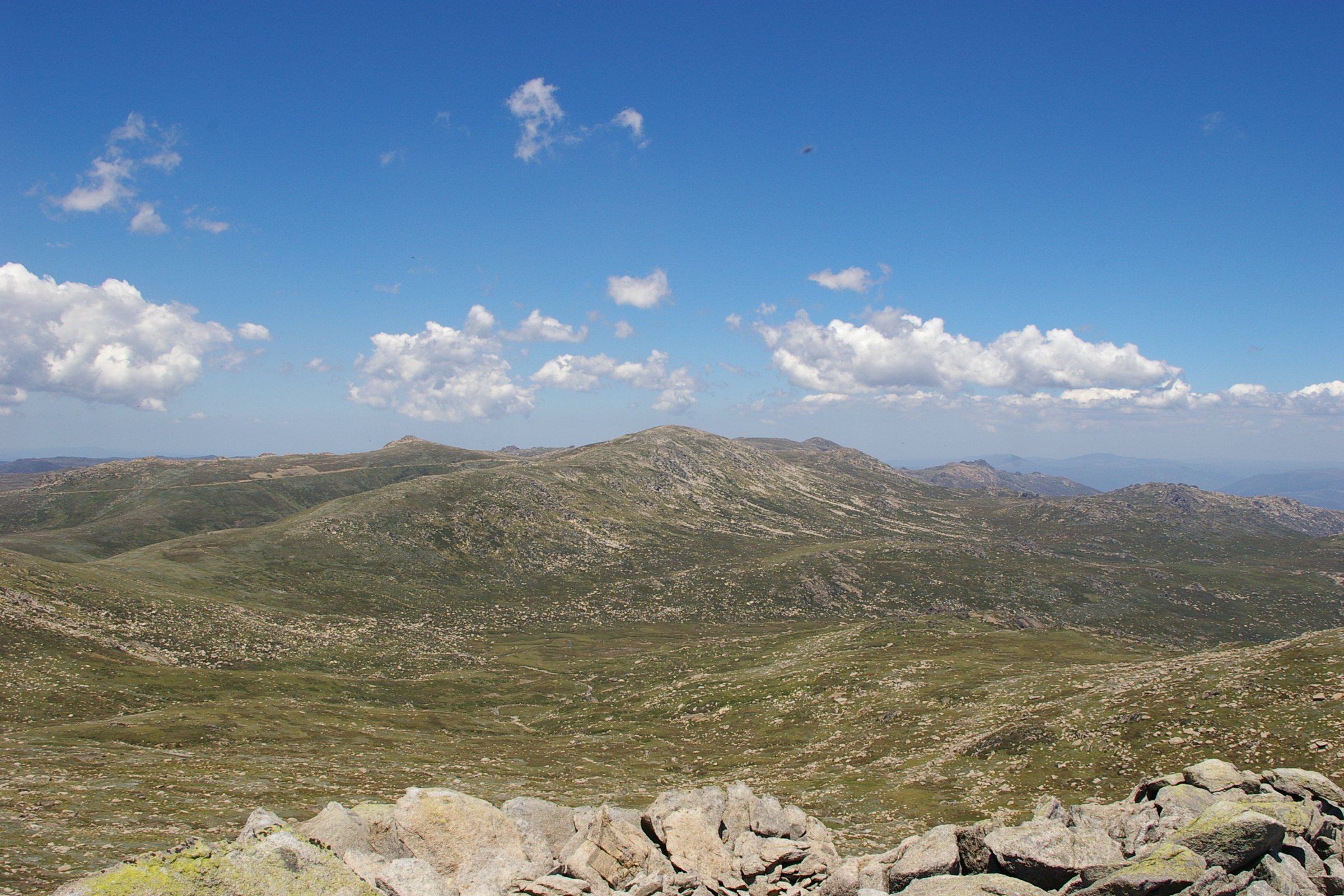
- The southern part of the Main Range, looking towards Mount Kosciuszko with the Ramshead Range in the background.

Highest point
- Peak: Mount Kosciuszko
- Elevation: 2,228 m (7,310 ft)
- Coordinates: 36°27′S 148°16′E

Geography
- Country: Australia
- Region: New South Wales

The section of the Great Dividing Range between the Ramshead Range and Dicky Cooper Bogong in the Snowy Mountains is known as the Main Range. It can also be used more generally for the peaks (not necessarily on the Great Dividing Range) on or on short spurs off the range. It contains many of the highest peaks in mainland Australia. Some peaks on the Main Range include (from the south):

- The Ramsheads
- Mount Kosciuszko
- Muellers Peak
- Mount Townsend, Mount Alice Rawson and Abbotts Peak (on Abbotts Ridge)
- Mount Northcote, Mount Clark and Mount Lee
- Carruthers Peak
- Mount Twynam and Little Twynam
- Mount Anton and Mount Anderson
- Mount Tate
- Dicky Cooper Bogong

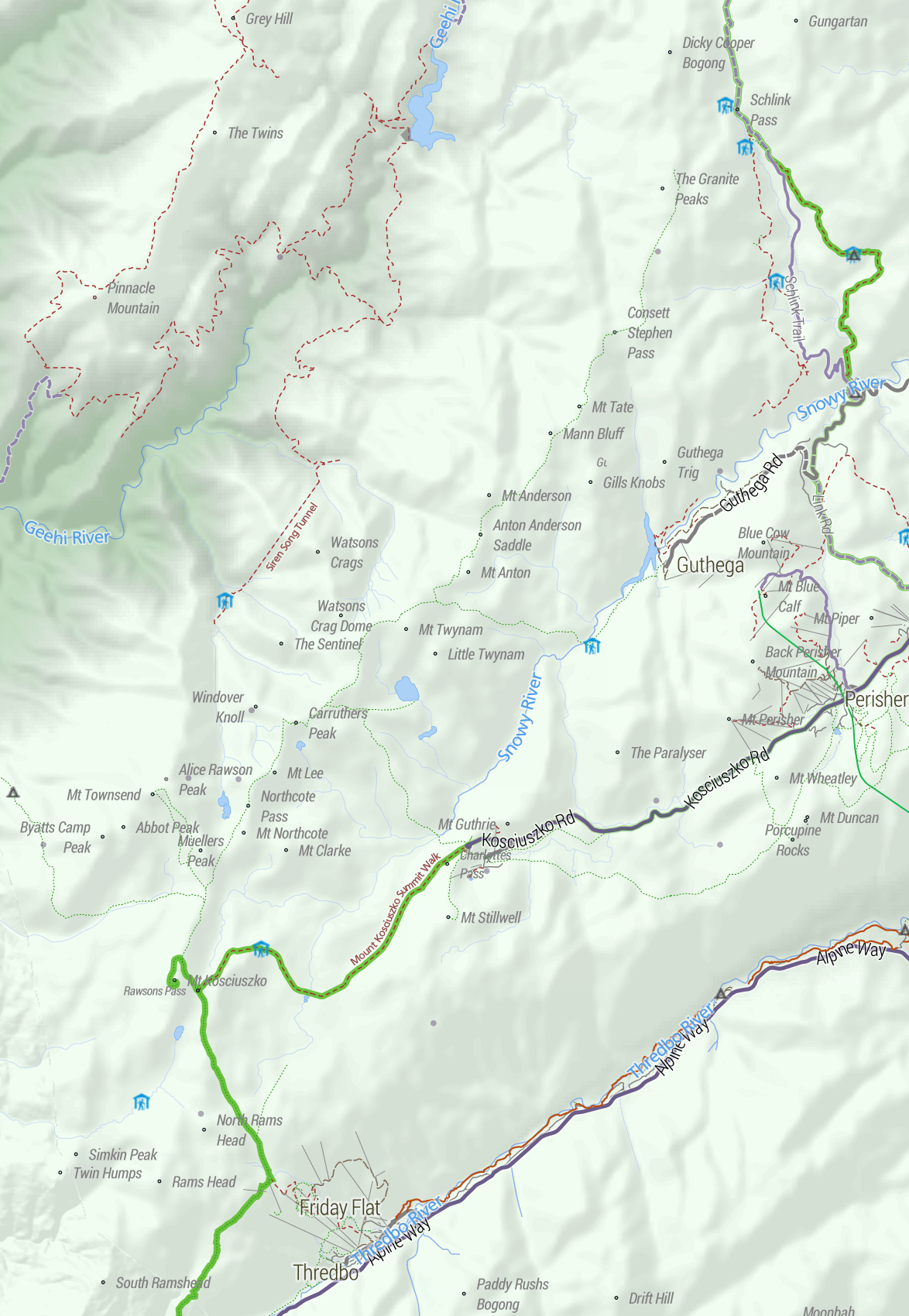
Topographic map of the Main Range.

== See also ==
- Australian Alps
