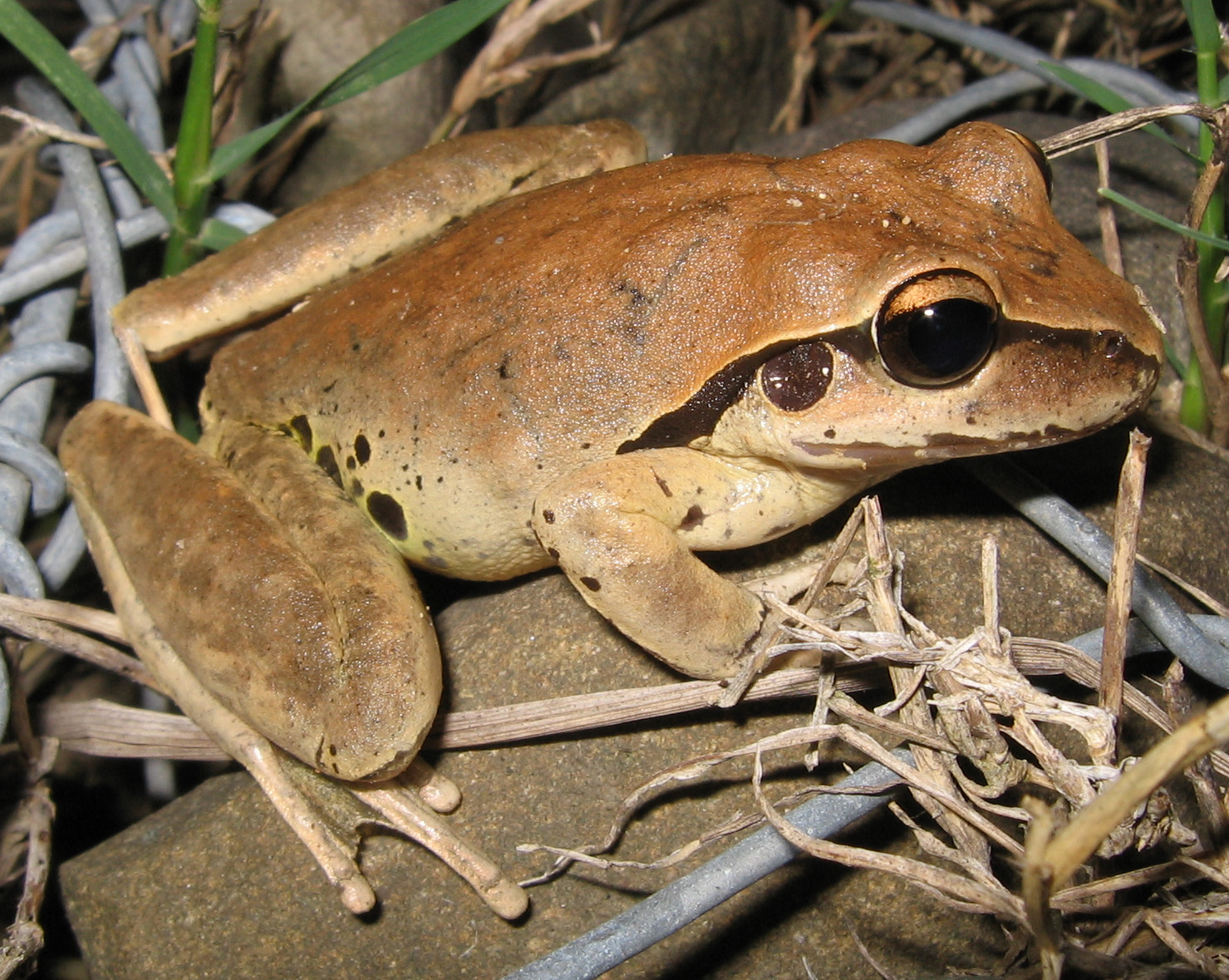
- Rhyaconastes wilcoxii (female)

Conservation status
- Least Concern (IUCN 3.1)

Scientific classification
- Kingdom: Animalia
- Phylum: Chordata
- Class: Amphibia
- Order: Anura
- Family: Pelodryadidae
- Genus: Rhyaconastes
- Species: R. wilcoxii

Binomial name
- Rhyaconastes wilcoxii Günther, 1864
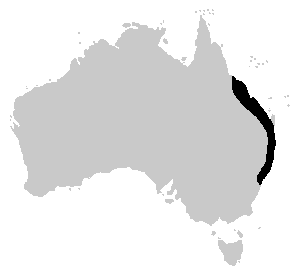
- Distribution of Rhyaconastes wilcoxii

Synonyms
- Litoria wilcoxii Günther, 1864; Hyla kinghorni Loveridge, 1950; Hyla vinosa Lamb, 1911; Ranoidea wilcoxii (Günther, 1864)

= Rhyaconastes wilcoxii =

Stony-creek frog

Species of amphibian

Rhyaconastes wilcoxii, also known as the stony-creek frog, eastern stony creek frog, and Wilcox's frog, is a species of frog in the subfamily Pelodryadinae. It is endemic to Australia, being found solely on the eastern coast between Ingham, QLD, and Sydney, NSW, and as far west as Atherton, QLD. Its natural habitats are subtropical or tropical dry forests, subtropical or tropical moist lowland forests, rivers, intermittent rivers, and pastureland.

== Taxonomy ==
This species is almost identical physiologically to Lesueur's frog, and is identical physiologically to R. jungguy. It can be distinguished from Lesueur's frog by the presence of blue spots on the thigh, which are missing in R. wilcoxii. Geographical distribution and genetic testing are the only methods of differentiating R. wilcoxii from R. jungguy.

== Description ==
Rhyaconastes wilcoxii shows extreme sexual dimorphism, meaning the males and females have different appearances. Females can reach a length of up to 70 mm (2.8 inches) and males 45 mm (1.8 inches). Individuals are a smooth brown in colour with speckling and blotching in the groin. A thick black stripe extends from the nostril to the base of the forearm, encompassing the eye and tympanum The lower underside and groin can be from a light yellow to olive green, tending more often towards a beige brown. The thighs will reflect this colouration, though more brightly. Females fit this description year-round, but males turn a bright yellow to yellow-orange during mating season. As with most members of its genus, they have climbing discs on their fingers and toes.

The stony creek frog's snout is very useful in the wild. It enables it to stay low underwater so it can stay away from predators. The snout acts as a ventilation system. When swimming underwater, the snout will stick slightly above the water so it can breathe.

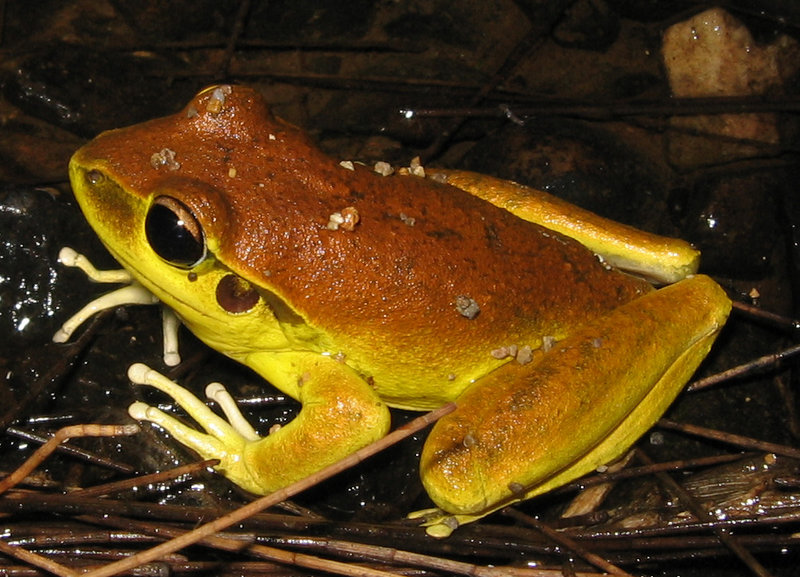
Male L. wilcoxii

== Reproduction ==
Males call with a very soft purring from debris such as rocks, vegetation or the ground immediately next to the water body.

Once the female has located the male, the pair will enter amplexus. Eggs will be laid in a single submerged cluster attached to a sediment.

== Threats ==
It is threatened by habitat loss, destruction of its native environment, in particular spawning locations, is leading to a decline in the number of this species. As with a great variety of Australian frog species, chytridiomycosis poses great threats to the future of this species, with some locales experiencing 28% infection rate.

== Images ==
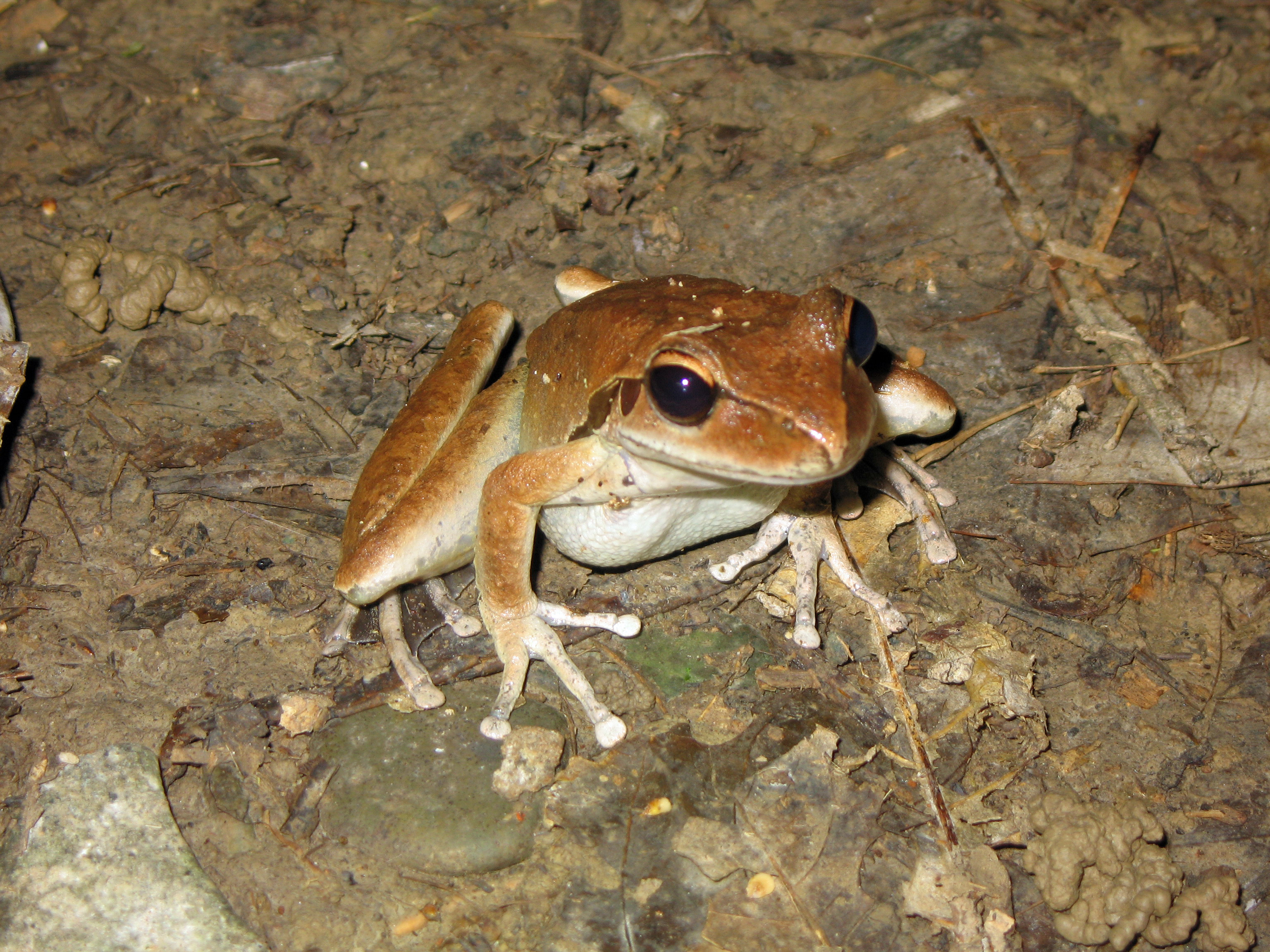

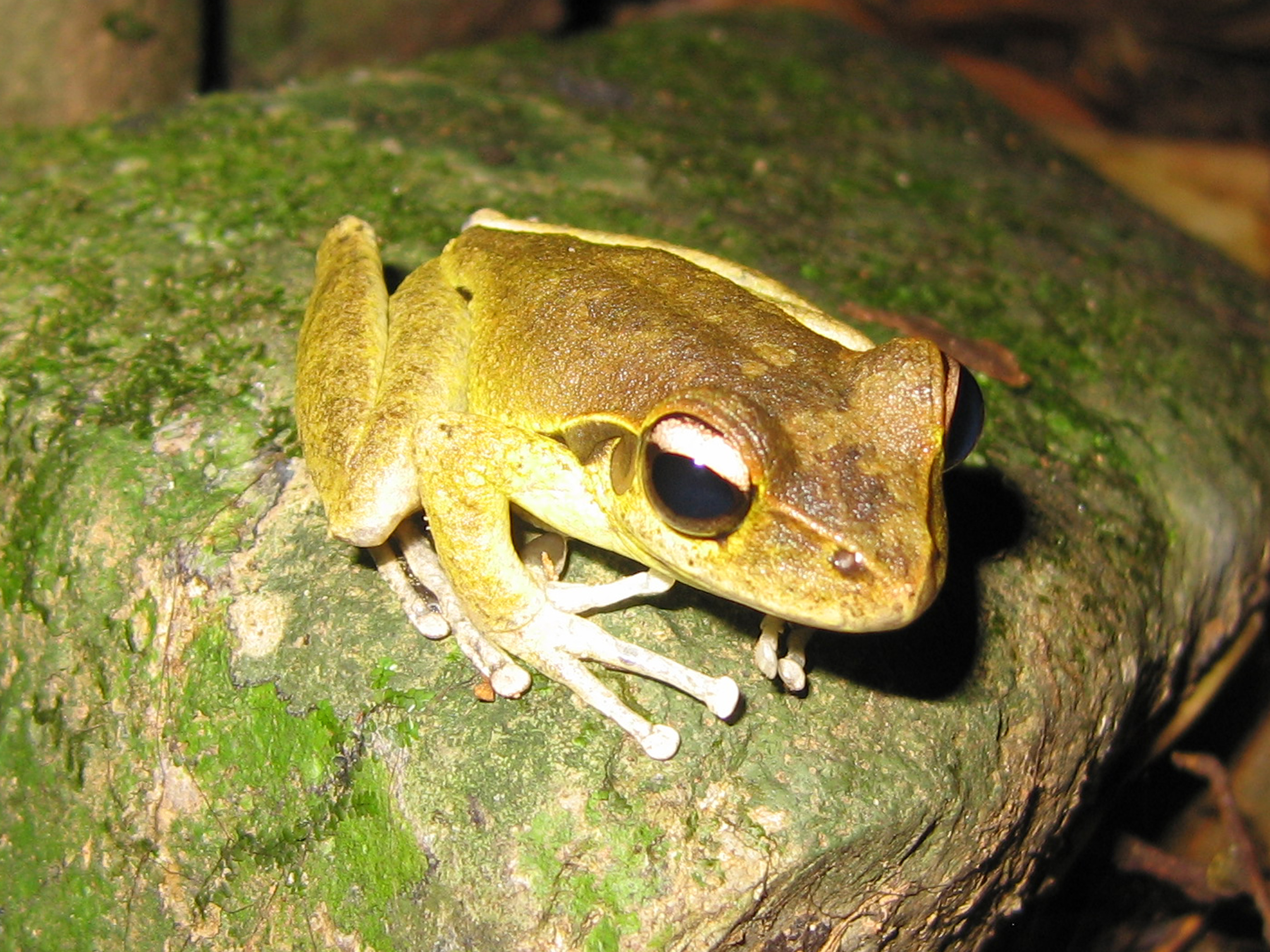

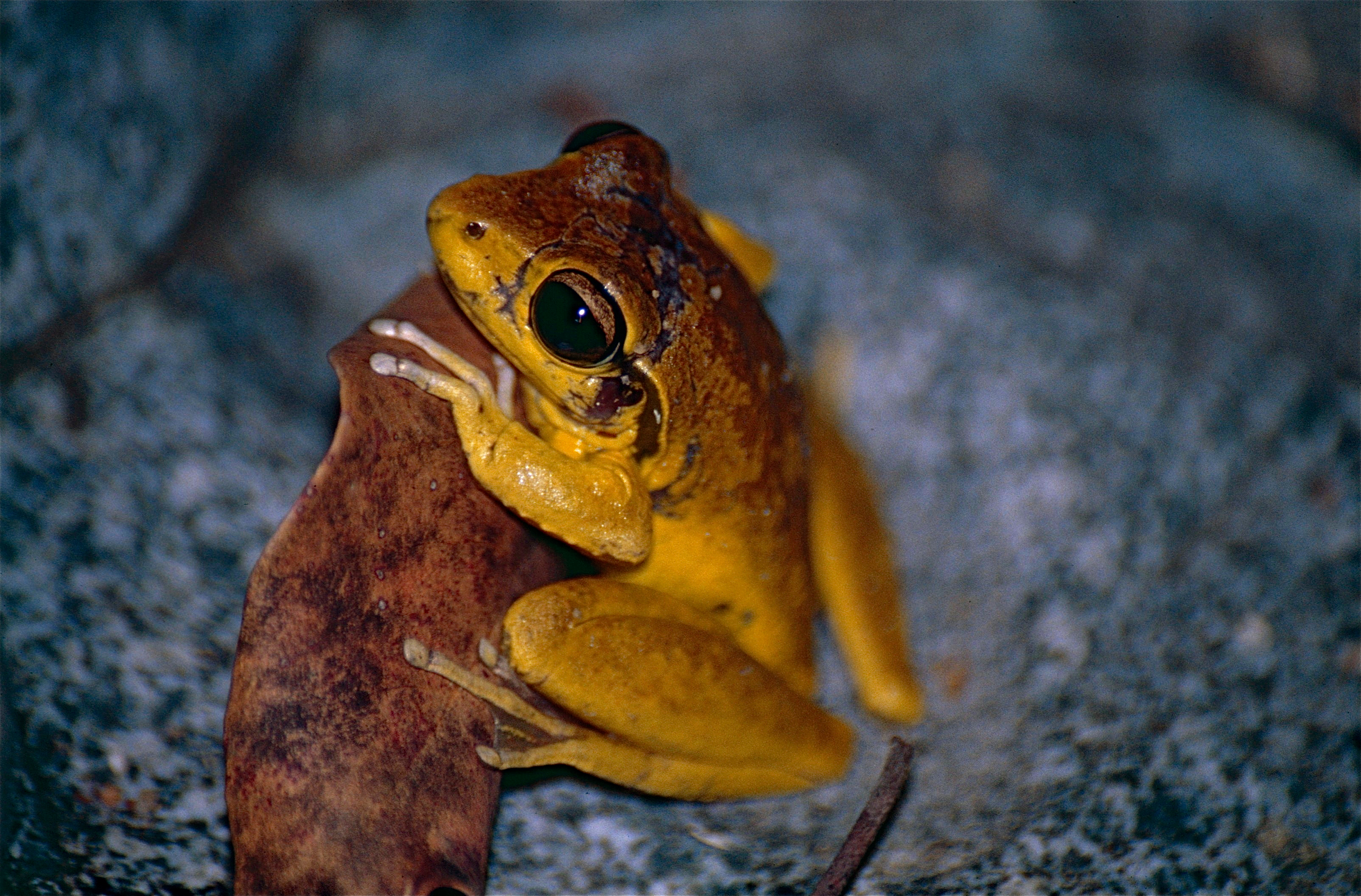

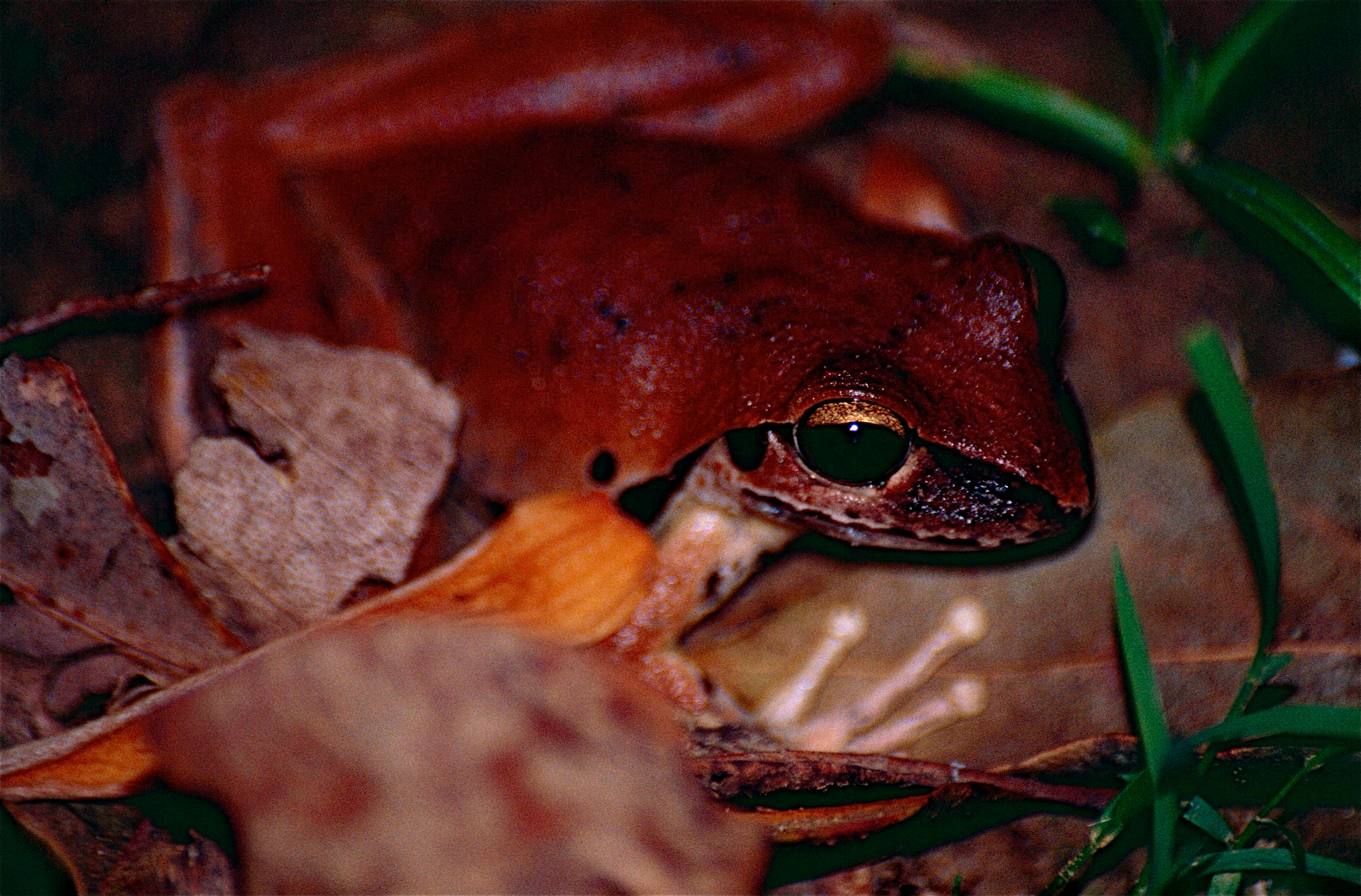

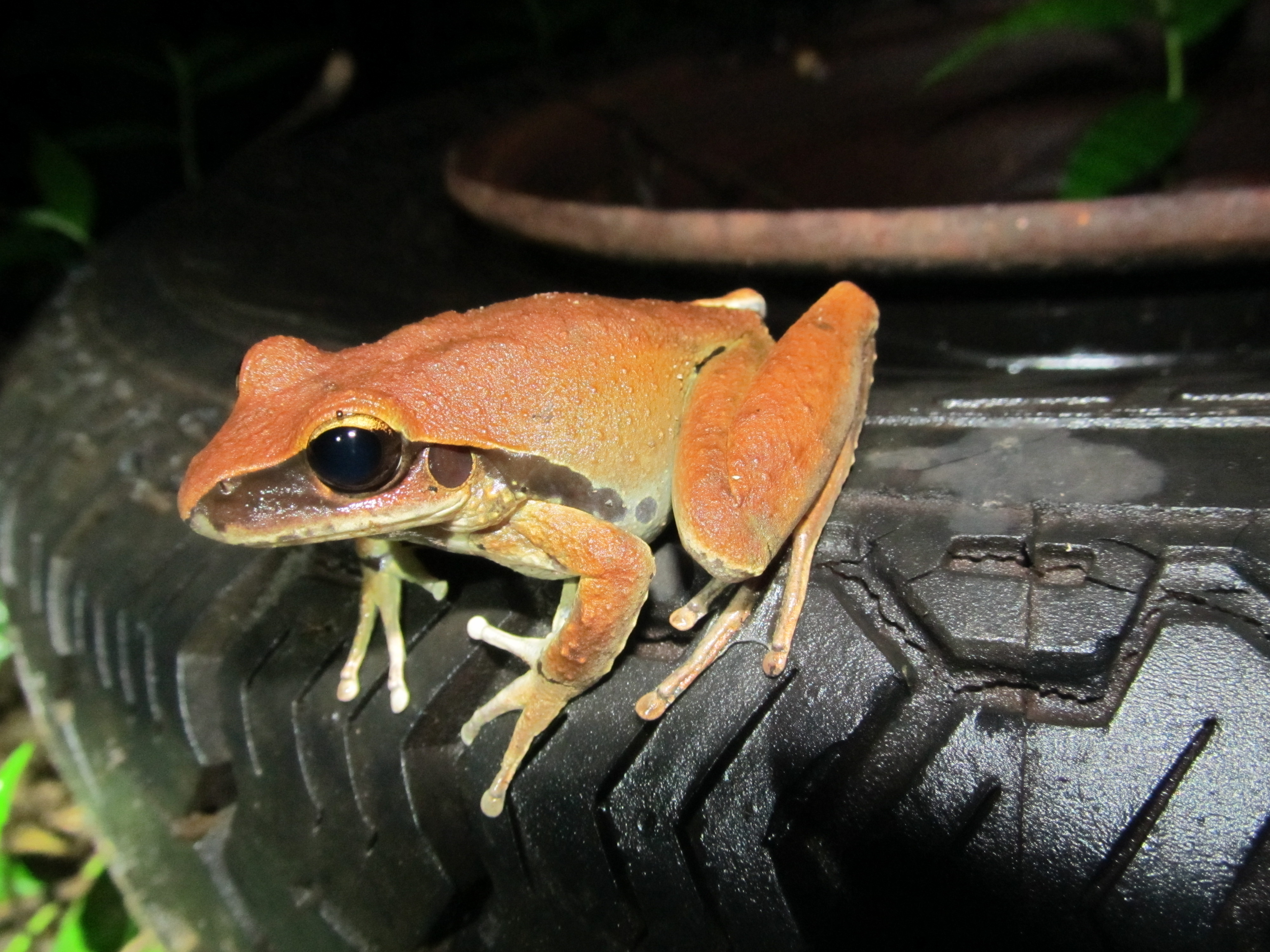
