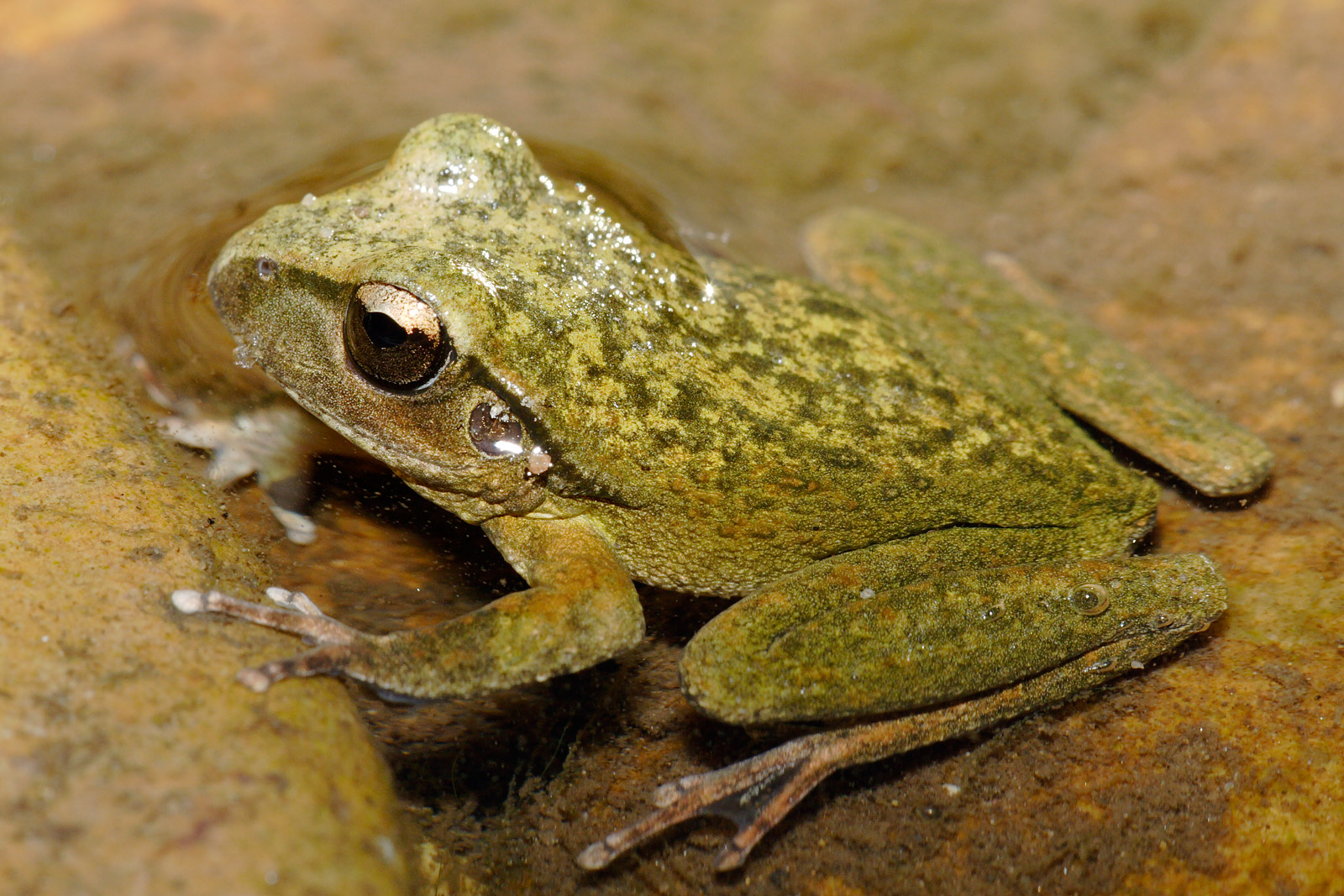

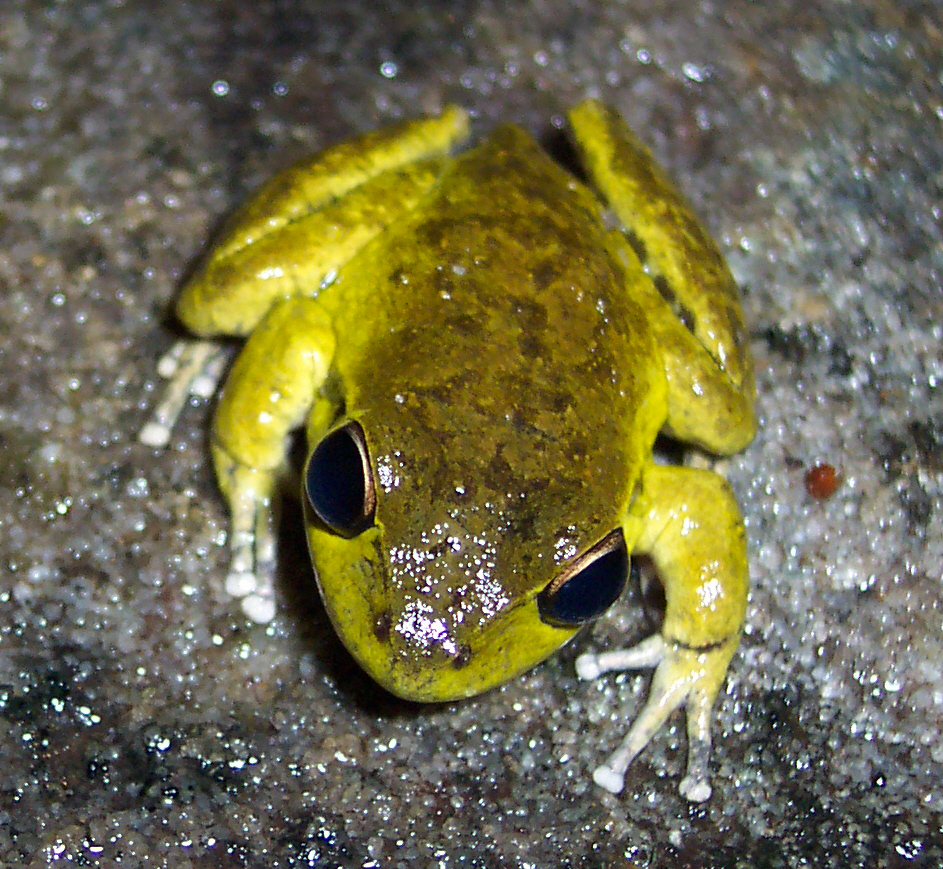

Conservation status
- Least Concern (IUCN 3.1)

Scientific classification
- Kingdom: Animalia
- Phylum: Chordata
- Class: Amphibia
- Order: Anura
- Family: Pelodryadidae
- Genus: Rhyaconastes
- Species: R. lesueuri

Binomial name
- Rhyaconastes lesueuri (Duméril & Bibron, 1841)
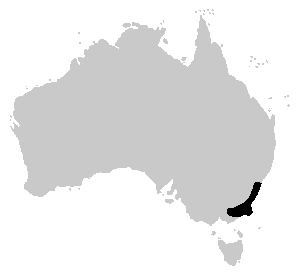
- Distribution of the Lesueur's Frog

= Lesueur's frog =

Species of amphibian

Lesueur's frog (Rhyaconastes lesueuri) is a species of ground-dwelling tree frog native to south-eastern Australia, from Sydney, to eastern Victoria.

== Etymology ==
The specific name, lesueuri, is in honor of French naturalist Charles Alexandre Lesueur.

== Description ==
Lesueur's frog is a moderately large frog; females of this species reach 7 cm (2.8 in), while males reach about 4.5 cm (1.8 in). It ranges from pale to dark brown above, but males in the breeding season become bright yellow. Often, darker patches occur on the back. A dark stripe runs from the snout to the shoulder. The backs of the legs are blue with black spots, which helps distinguish this species from the very similar stony creek frog. The top half of the iris is pale and the bottom half dark. The toe discs are small and the belly is white.

== Ecology and behaviour ==
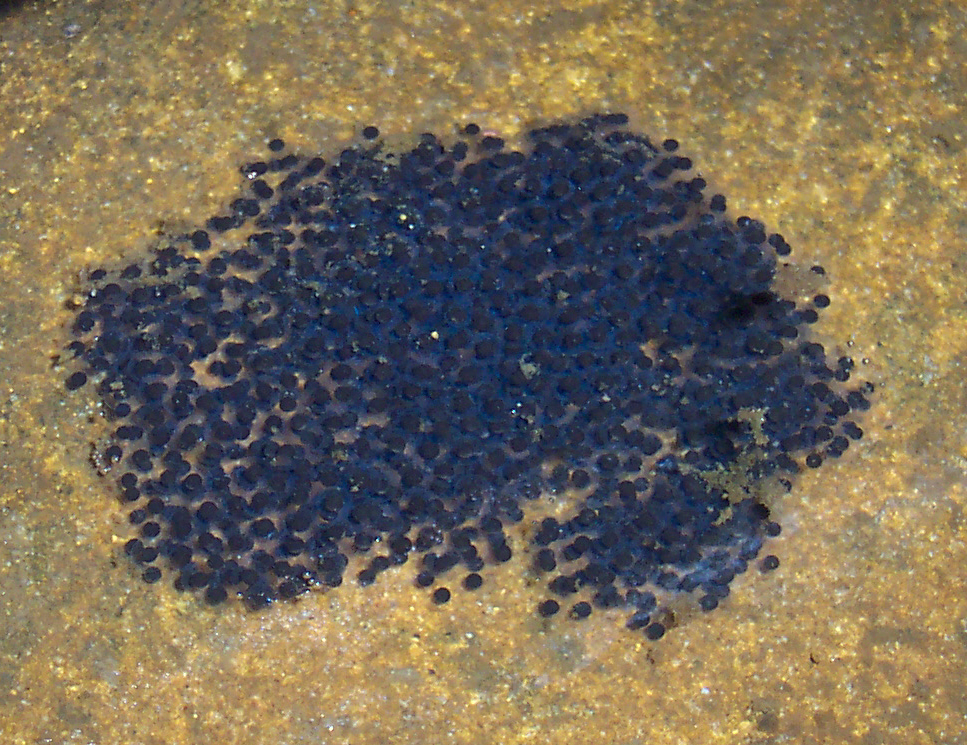
Lesueur's frog spawn

Lesueur's frog is associated with rocky streams and creeks in coastal heath forests, montane areas, and rainforests. Males make a soft, purring call from beside creeks or from pools on the edges of streams during spring, summer, and autumn. Breeding occurs mostly after rain.

An average of about 1630 eggs are laid in single clump loosely attached to bedrock in streams. The eggs are normally laid in still pools of streams. Hatching occurs up to a week after laying. Tadpoles reach about 4.5 cm (1.8 in), and are golden brown. Metamorphosis occurs during summer and autumn, about 50–60 days after laying. Metamorph frogs are small, about 1.4 cm (0.6 in) and resemble the adult, but the dark stripe on the head is not very prominent.

In 2004, this species was divided into three separate species, with the stony creek frog north of Sydney and Rhyaconastes jungguy in northern Queensland.
