= Flower anemone =

Flower anemone may refer:

- Anemone, a type of flower
- Phymanthus crucifer, a type of sea anemone
