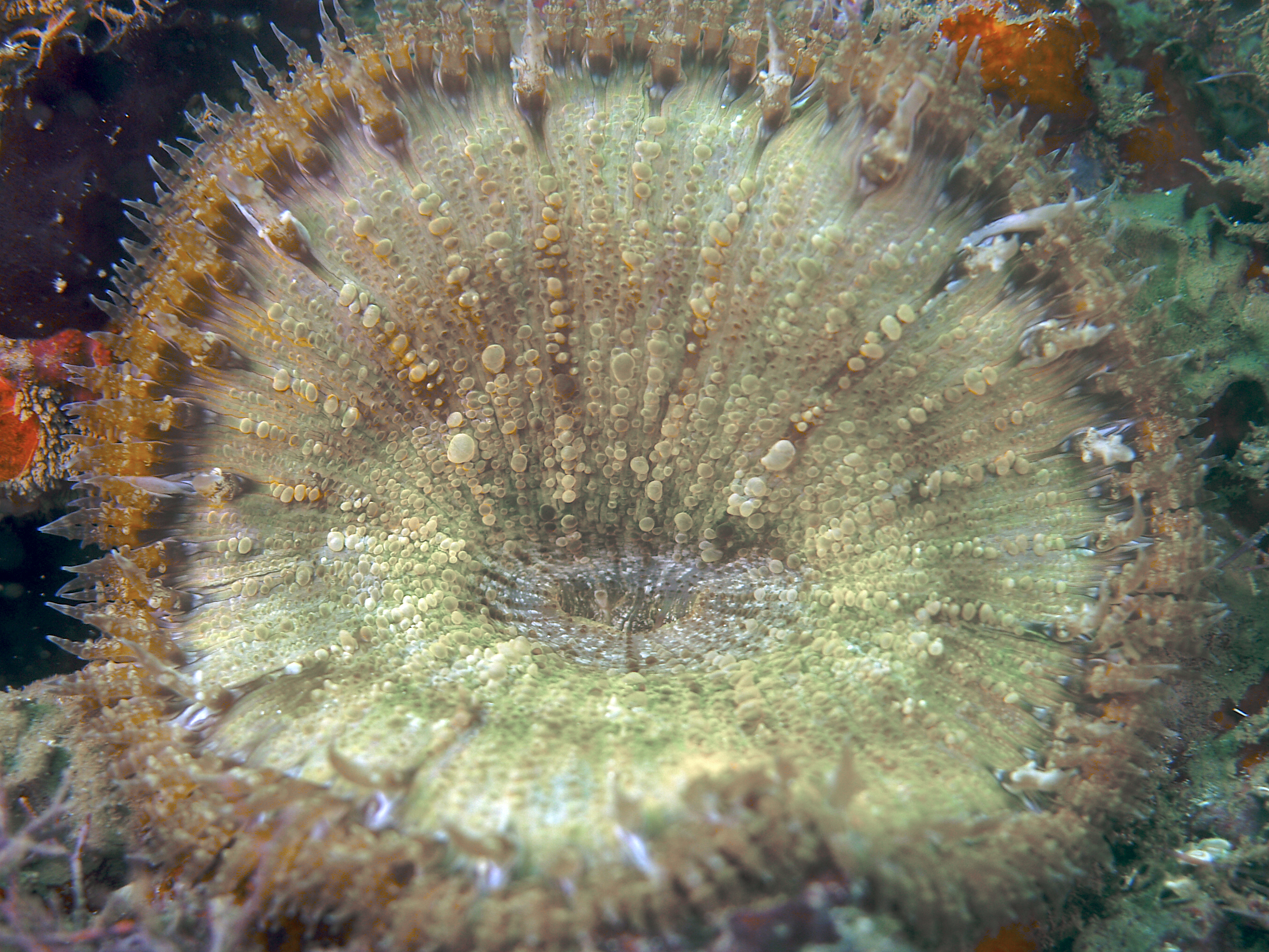

Conservation status
- Vulnerable (NatureServe)

Scientific classification
- Kingdom: Animalia
- Phylum: Cnidaria
- Subphylum: Anthozoa
- Class: Hexacorallia
- Order: Actiniaria
- Family: Phymanthidae
- Genus: Phymanthus
- Species: P. crucifer

Binomial name
- Phymanthus crucifer (Le Sueur, 1817)

Synonyms
- List: Actinia crucifera Le Sueur, 1817; Cereus crucifer (Le Sueur, 1817); Epicystis crucifer (Le Sueur, 1817); Epicystis crucifera (Le Sueur, 1817); Epicystis osculifera (Le Sueur, 1817); Phimanthus crucifer; Phymantes crucifer; Phymanthus cruciferus; Ragactis cruciata Andres, 1883

= Phymanthus crucifer =

Species of sea anemone

Phymanthus crucifer, commonly known as rock flower anemone, flower anemone, red beaded anemone or the beaded anemone, is a species of sea anemone in the family Phymanthidae. It has been described as "closely similar" to Heteractis aurora in several ways, commonly exhibiting "tentacles with swollen cross-bars" bearing large clusters of stinging nematocysts. However, P. crucifer may also be found with smooth tentacles, sometimes in the immediate vicinity of a swollen-crossbarred specimen.

The disk, flat and edged with about 200 short tentacles, may grow to 15 centimetres (5.9 in) across. The column, fully extended, may reach 15 to 20 centimetres (5.9 to 7.9 in) in length with a diameter of 51 to 76 millimetres (2.0 to 3.0 in) in large individuals; however, most individuals have only half this length and diameter. P. crucifer exhibits a high degree of colour variability, ranging from sandy or buff to dull green or even red. The base of the column is generally cream-coloured with streaks of red, greying towards the top. Rows of light and dark stripes and bumps radiate outward from the mouth, varying in colour from bright green in the centre to brown, lavender, yellow, or white going outwards. It has bright red suckers on its column, to which debris can attach for camouflage.

P. crucifer inhabits the sandy bottoms of the Caribbean Sea and can be found across the West Indies. The main part (column) of the anemone is usually buried in the sand, anchored to a rock below the surface, so that when disturbed the anemone can pull back into the substrate. Documented as a species often associated with coral reefs and rocky ledges, P. crucifer is able to withdraw into crevices and holes if agitated.

The reproductive cycle in this species has been observed to be prolonged (longer than annual or biannual), suggesting differences between the reproductive cycles of tropical sea anemones and those of cooler water anemones. P. crucifer can reproduce sexually, with the eggs developing into larvae inside the parent. P. crucifer is a dioecious species, having distinctly male and female individuals and large eggs.
