= Yarrangobilly Caves =

Karst in New South Wales, Australia

Coordinates: 35.7251°S 148.4914°E

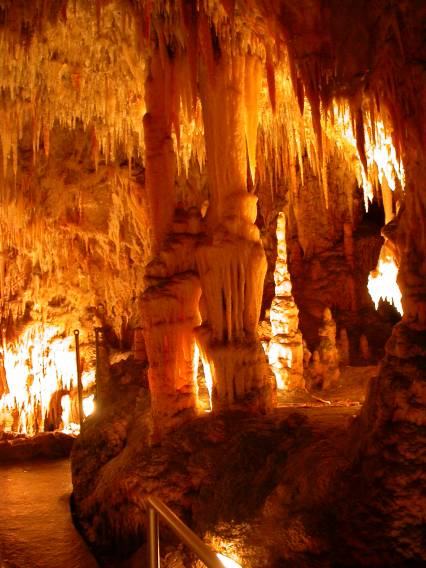
Yarrangobilly Caves

The Yarrangobilly Caves are located in a 12-kilometre-long (7.5 mi) karst region along the Yarrangobilly River valley in the north of Kosciuszko National Park, New South Wales, Australia. Discovered to British colonists by a cattleman, the Yarrangobilly Caves system includes several independent limestone caves formed over different time periods, from several million to a few hundred thousand years old. The older examples are in higher strata and have more speleothem decoration.

The caves are administered by the National Parks and Wildlife Service. Three lit show caves are regularly open to visitors, two for guided tours and the third for a self-guided tour. The caves complex also includes a 20-metre-long (66 ft) and up to 2.5-metre-deep (8 ft) 27 °C (81 °F) thermal pool, fed by natural warm-water springs, and a number of walking tracks.

== History ==
The cave was formed in 440-million-year-old limestone, and was first discovered by Europeans in 1834 when a stockman John Bowman came across the complex.

Leo James Hoad was associated with the caves from 1904–1950, serving as the official caretaker of the caves from 1919 to 1946. He discovered the Jillabenan Cave in 1910.

The largest building on the site is Caves House, built in 1901 when the caves were the most popular resort in New South Wales. It can be booked as accommodation for groups of visitors.

== Show caves ==
South Glory Cave is a self-guided cave, with a path length of 470 metres (1,540 ft), including 206 steps plus ramps.

Jersey Cave is noted for its rare displays of black and grey flowstone, coloured by ash from ancient bushfires. The path length is 185 metres (607 ft) and includes 217 steps.

Jillabenan Cave features soda straw stalactites, flowstone shawls, cave coral and helictites. The path length is 73 metres (240 ft) and includes 15 stairs. It is suitable for wheelchair access (though the Parks wheelchair must be used, as the rails over steps inside the cave are fixed-width).

The North Glory Cave has a common entrance with the South Glory through Glory Arch and features chambers such as the Queens Chamber, Helictite Chamber and Devils Kitchen. The path length is 358 metres (1,175 ft) and includes 191 stairs.

Several other unlit caves in the Yarrangobilly complex can be visited with tours run by the NPWS: North Glory Cave and Smugglers Passage, Harrie Wood Cave and Castle Cave. These tours run daily during Christmas and Easter, or by prior arrangement, and require a minimum of eight people to run. For the unlit caves, helmets and lights are provided.
