= Natural History Museum of Le Havre =

Museum in Le Havre, France

Coordinates: 49.48777030204418°N 0.10908572533143274°E

Natural History Museum
- Museum d’histoire naturelle
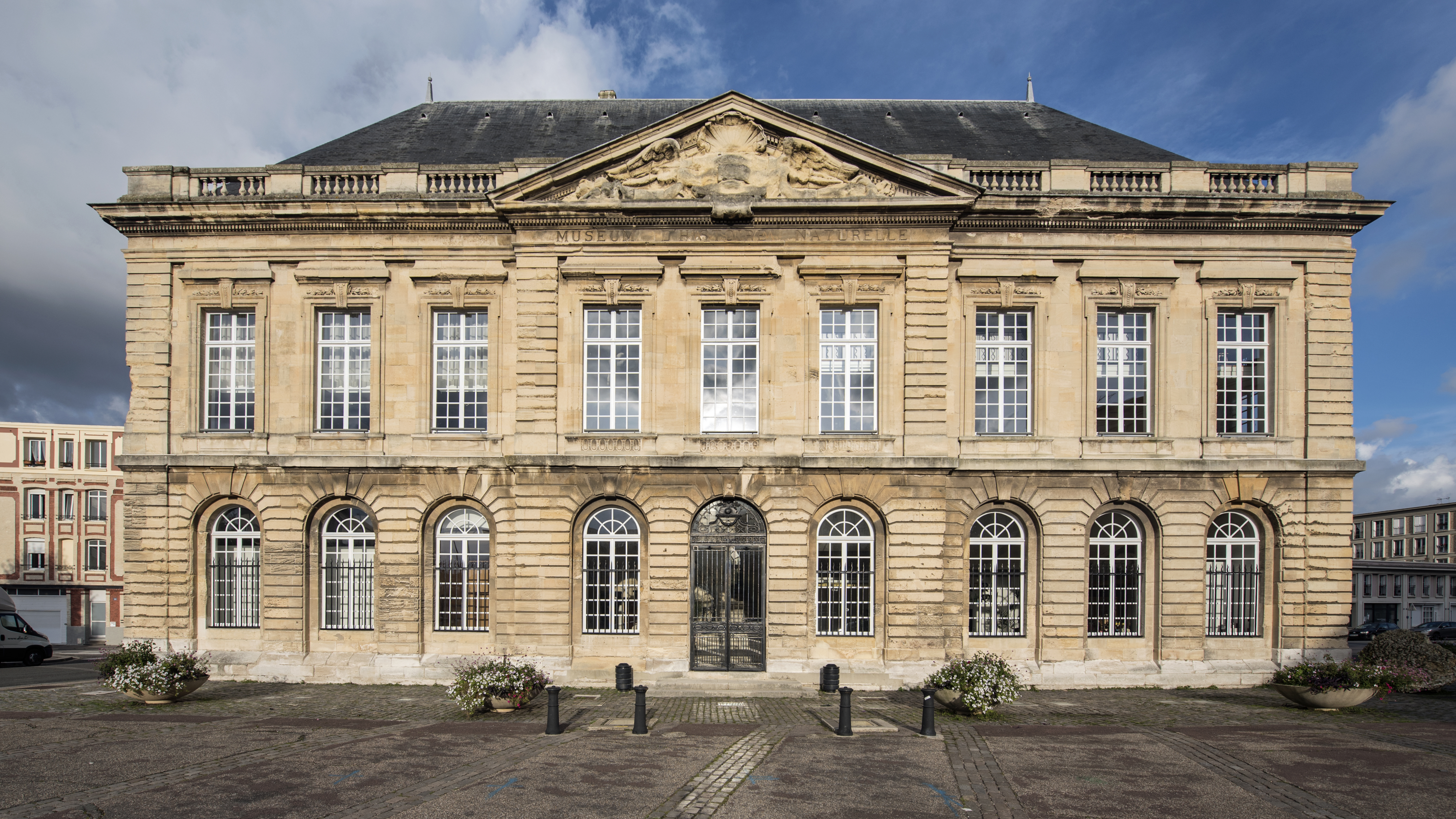

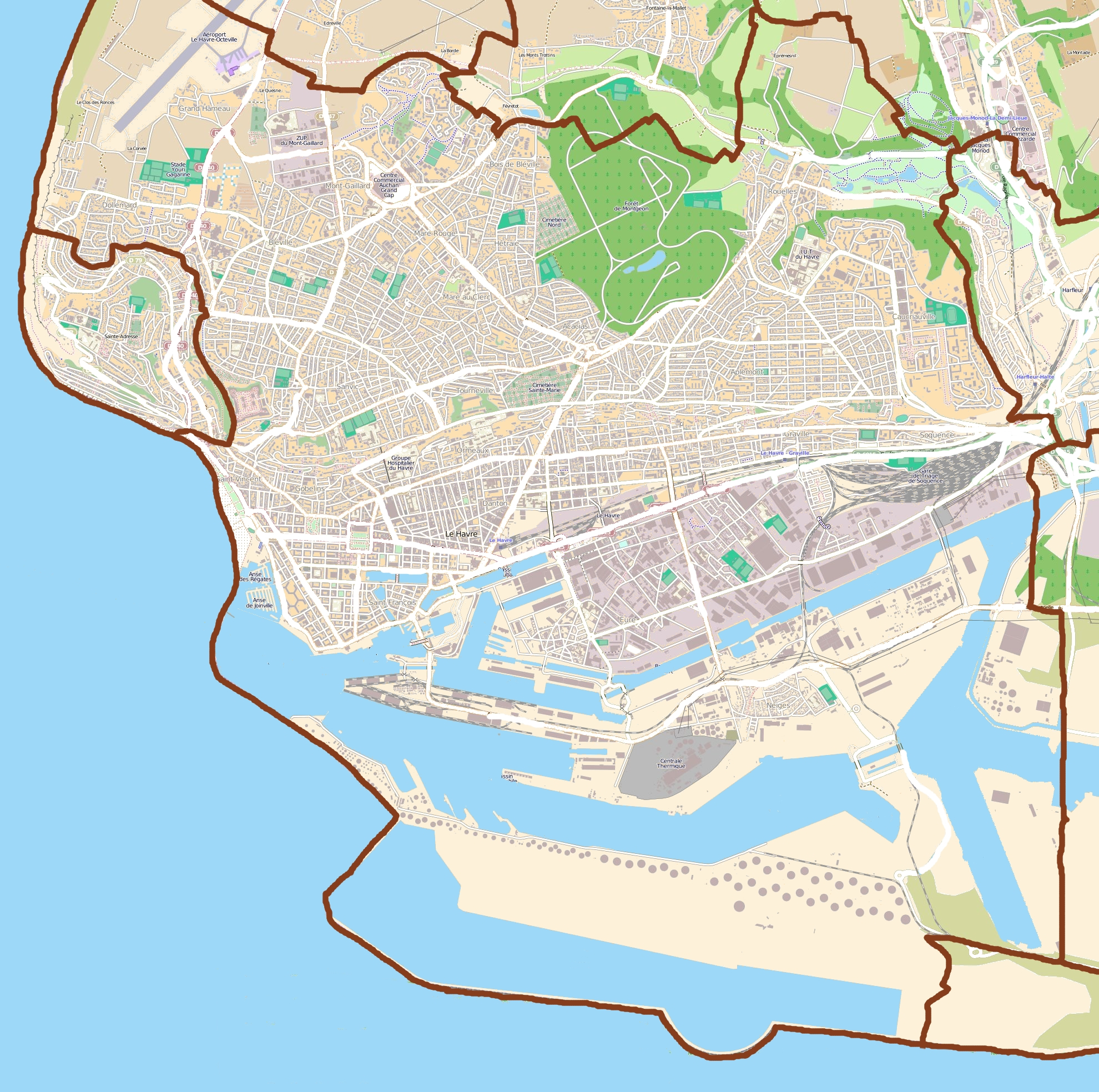
- Location in Le Havre
- Established: 1855
- Location: Le Havre, France
- Type: Natural history museum
- Website: www.musees-mah-lehavre.fr

Natural History Museum (Muséum d'histoire naturelle) is a museum that specializes in zoology, prehistory, and paleontology and is located in the city of Le Havre in the Normandy region of France.

== History ==
The Natural History Museum of Le Havre was founded in 1837–1838 by Charles Alexandre Lesueur, an explorer and naturalist who donated his extensive collections to the City of Le Havre. These collections served as a foundation for the museum, which was initially housed in the building of the Museum-Bibliotheque. It was opened to the public in 1855. Later in 1877, the French Association of Advancement in Sciences (AFAS), together with the Geological Society, held an exhibition at the former Palais de Justice, which drew attention to the growing importance of the museum. By 1879, the collections of the museum had significantly expanded due to the donations of drawings by Peron and C.A. Leseuer made by Le Havre citizens (Ms. Lockart and Mr. Pellot). Due to space constraints, the museum was relocated to the former Palais de Justice in 1881. The opening ceremony was held the same year on April 24 by Gustav Lennier, who played a key role in the establishment and development of the museum.

During the Second World War, both the building where the museum was located and its collections were severely damaged. The majority of the collections could not be restored. However, collections of graphic arts and some paleontological and ethnological objects were evacuated from the museum and, thus, saved from the bombardments. The roof and the floors of the building, as well as its south wing, were destroyed. During the period of reconstruction of Le Havre, Auguste Perret contributed to the restoration of the museum. The surviving facade and staircase were added to the supplementary list of historical monuments, which guaranteed their preservation. Due to the bad condition of the remaining parts, it was decided to build an identical structure instead, and in 1965, the museum was opened to the public again in 1973. In 2006–2007 and 2016–2017, the museum saw multiple construction works that improved the facilities and renovated the exhibition space. In 2023, another phase of construction aimed to install permanent collections in the exposition halls (expected to terminate in 2025).

== The Architecture of the museum ==
The building where the Natural History Museum is currently located used to be the former Palais de Justice of Le Havre. The structure itself dates back to 1758–1760 and is attributed to an engineer named Dubois. Prior to the construction of the Palais de Justice, the space was occupied by the building that housed the police tribunal and ordinary assemblies. However, the old building was reported to be in bad condition, so a new building was erected. The building represents the dominant architectural style of the 18th century, known as Neoclassicism. The building has only one floor on top of the ground floor.

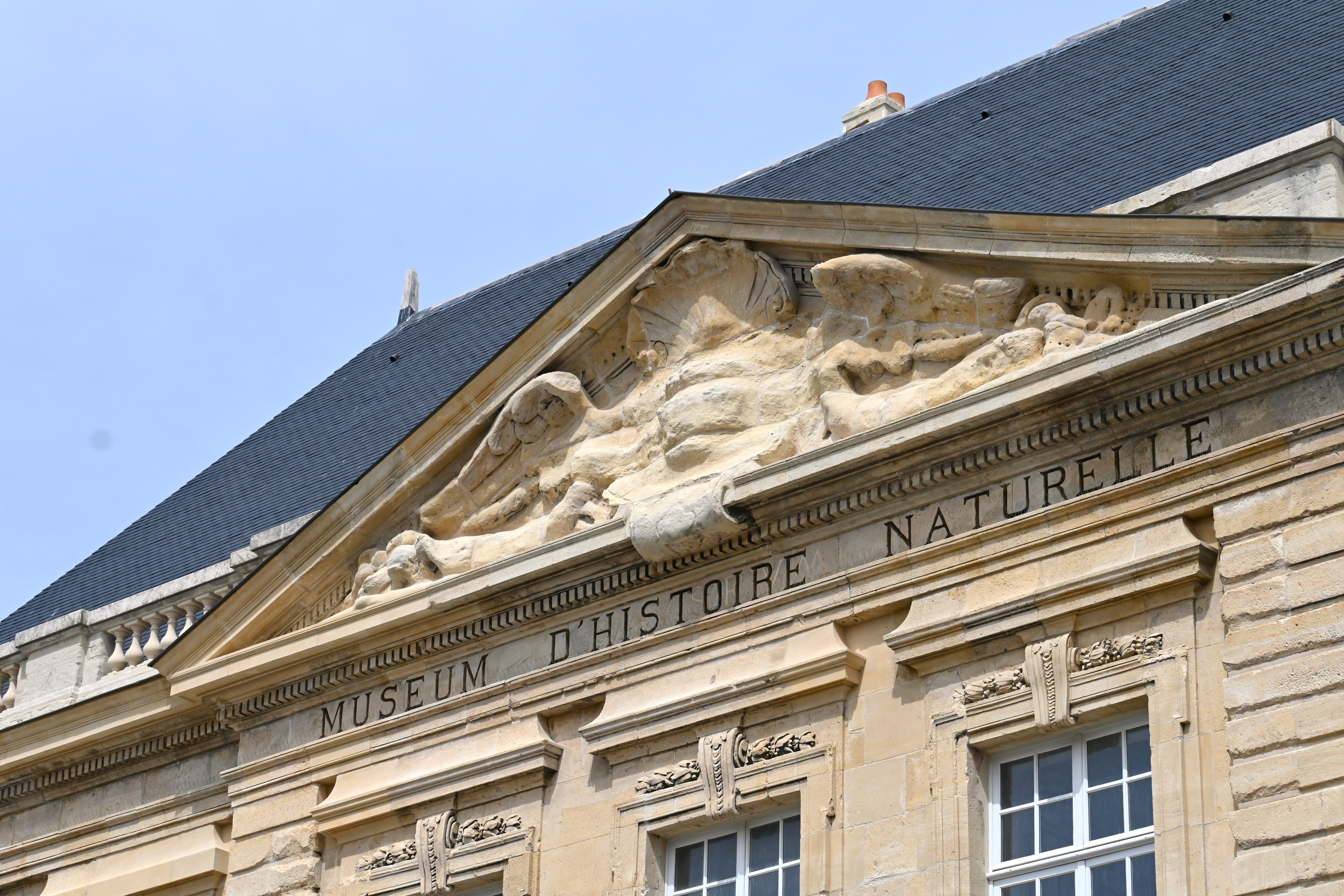
Close-up of the pediment

The facade is decorated with a stoop, a forecourt, and a pediment decorated with a coat of arms featuring a crown and seashell motif and framed with cornucopias on either side. The top of the first floor is finished with a balustrade, and the roof is topped by an ornate square lantern with an obelisk bearing a fleur-de-lis.

The staircase is in the middle and leads to large apartments used by various jurisdictions before the Palais de Justice was converted into the Natural History Museum.

== Collection ==
The collections of the Natural History Museum are divided into six sections corresponding to Lesueur’s collection: paleontology, ethnology, stones and minerals, archeology, and zoology. The collections are composed of private donations, purchases, and objects obtained through partnerships.

=== Lesueur collection ===
Charles-Alexandre Lesueur (1778–1846) was an explorer and a naturalist. The collection of his travel drawings and manuscripts exhibited at the museum amounts to 8,000. His works are dedicated to his journeys from France to the US and Australia. The drawings include landscapes, portraits, and depictions of minerals and fossils. Lesueur used different techniques and materials but watercolors and pencil prevailed in his drawings.

At the age of 24, Lesueur was admitted as a painter to one of the expeditions to the Australian lands organized by Napoleon Bonaparte in 1800–1804 and supervised by Nicolas Baudin (1754–1803). During the journey, he created multiple zoology drawings together with François Peron (1775–1801). Upon his return to France, he dedicated his time to publishing works on the results of the expedition as well as fundamental research on jellyfish.

In 1815, he left for the United States as a geology painter, where he lived for 20 years in Philadelphia and later moved to New Harmony, Indiana. The drawings that he created during that time show everyday life, landscapes, and local people

He returned to Le Havre in 1837, where he focused on studying the fossils found on the Cape de la Heve. Eight years later, he founded the Natural History Museum.

=== Paleontology ===
The paleontological collection of the museum consists of 64,413 specimens, demonstrating the development of fauna starting with the first types of multicellular organisms. The majority of the specimens exhibited at the museum are of Norman origin (including 155 million-year-old fossils of dinosaurs and marine reptiles found at the Cape de la Heve). Thus, due to the rarity of the displayed fossils, this collection is very valuable for research in the field of paleontology.

=== Ethnology ===
The ethnological collection of the museum is represented by almost a million objects gathered in Africa and Oceania. They were brought to Le Havre by citizens who were involved in trade with Africa and Oceania. Back in the 18th and 19th centuries, objects of aboriginal cultures were attributed to natural history rather than the arts; therefore, they were donated to the museum of natural history. During the Second World War, a part of the collection was destroyed.

The objects from Africa exhibited at the museum reflect the commercial, maritime, military, and colonial history of France and Le Havre in particular. The collection comprises 500 copper objects such as masks, statuettes, weaponry, symbols of power, religious and cult objects, and musical instruments originating from Somalia, Nigeria, Zimbabwe, and Nigeria. All of them play a significant role in understanding history and symbolism inherent in African cultures.

About 200 objects exhibited at the museum come from Oceania, where they were claimed by the colonial administration in the 19th century. They include some rarities that can be found only in the archipelago of New Zealand and on Easter Island and are not often presented in European collections.

In addition, the collection includes a variety of coins of African and Pacific origin. The former was collected by the general Louis Archinand during the French colonial wars in Senegal and Sudan, while the latter were brought by Louis Le Mescam, a trader in New Caledonia, and explorer Eugène Delesser.

=== Petrology and mineralogy ===
The petrological and mineralogical collections (7,463 specimens) are represented by the stones and minerals collected in Normandy and outside of the region. They include very rare and valuable types such as lazurite from Morocco, pink rhodochrosite from Argentina, black tourmaline from Madagascar, and green autunite from Haute Vienne.

=== Archeology ===
The archaeological collection (12 240 samples) of the museum comprises various objects that were found in Normandy and supposedly date back to the Neolithic age between 6000 and 2000 BC. The artifacts consist mostly of lithic, but also include ceramic and copper objects.

=== Zoology ===
The zoological collection (14,273 specimens) of the museum mostly consists of specimens of birds (i.e., passerines, birds of prey, corvids, etc.) but also includes mammals (i.e., polar bears, giraffes, lions, tigers, rhinoceros, etc.), reptiles, and insects from all over the world. There are also some extinct animals displayed.

The majority of the early collections of the museum were destroyed during the Second World War in 1944. Thus, in order to restore the collections, the Natural History Museum of Le Havre established partnerships with such organizations as CERZA, BIOTROPICA, and BIOPARK Oceanopolis. The modern collections are further expanded by more recent donations to the museum.

The collection is complemented by a number of osteological objects (373 specimens), including the skeletons of elephants, hippopotamus, and gorillas, as well as a number of butterflies and their pupae (2,860 samples).
