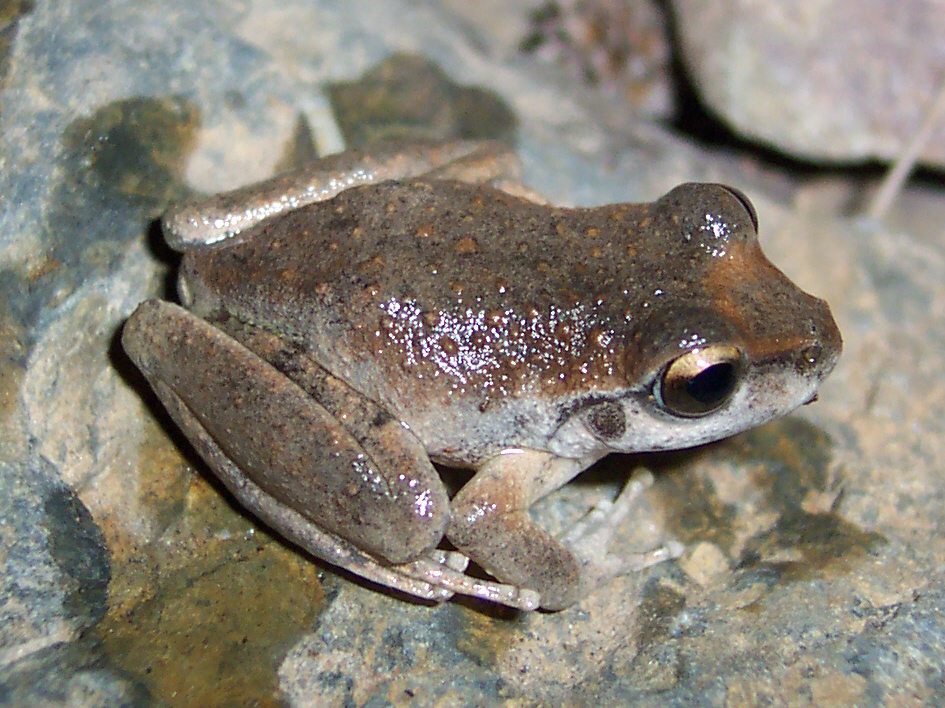

Conservation status
- Endangered (IUCN 3.1)

Scientific classification
- Kingdom: Animalia
- Phylum: Chordata
- Class: Amphibia
- Order: Anura
- Family: Pelodryadidae
- Genus: Rhyaconastes
- Species: R. booroolongensis

Binomial name
- Rhyaconastes booroolongensis (Moore, 1961)
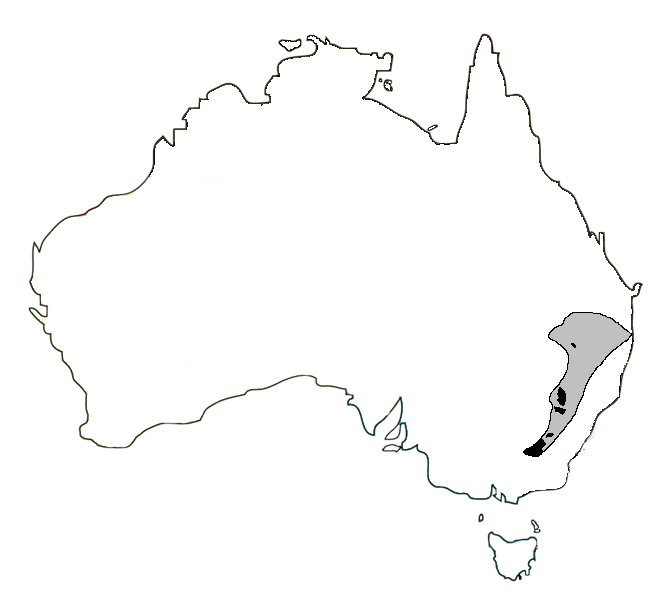
- Current distribution of the Booroolong frog (in black) compared to the historic distribution (in grey).

Synonyms
- Hyla booroolongensis (Moore, 1961); Litoria booroolongensis (Moore, 1961); Rawlinsonia booroolongensis (Moore, 1961); Dryopsophus booroolongensis (Moore, 1961); Ranoidea booroolongensis (Moore, 1961)

= Booroolong frog =

Species of frog

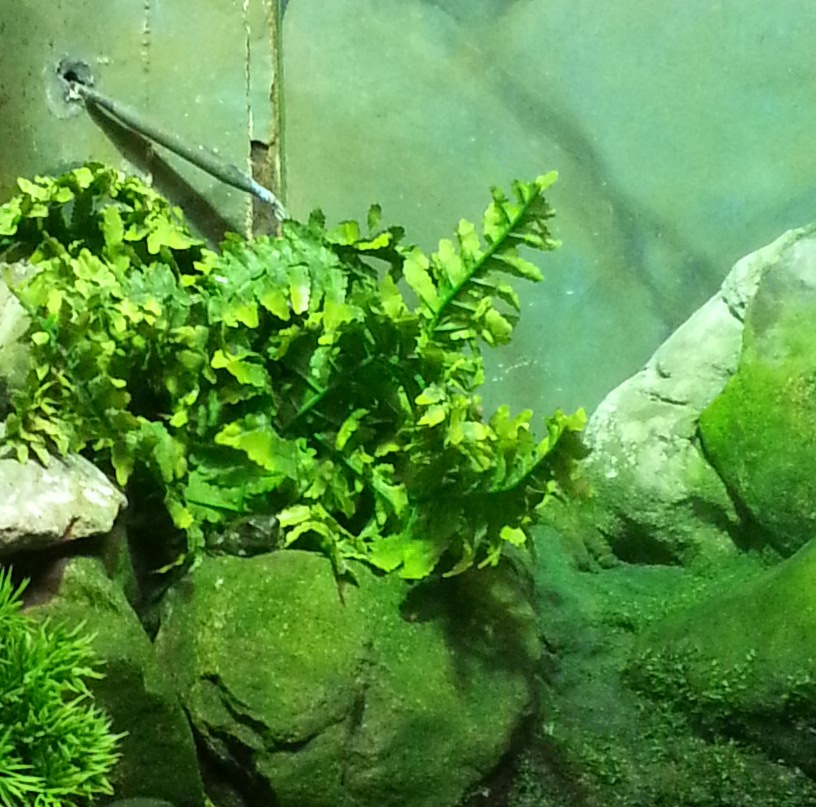
An image of a Booroolong frog taken at its enclosure in the Taronga Zoo in Sydney, Australia

The Booroolong frog (Rhyaconastes booroolongensis) is a species of stream-dwelling frog native to the Great Dividing Range in New South Wales, Australia. It is a member of the Pelodryadidae, or the "Australo-Papuan tree frog" family. The Booroolong frog is classified by the IUCN as an Endangered Species.

== Description ==
=== Physical ===
==== Adults ====
This frog is a medium-sized frog, with the females reaching about 55 mm (2.2 inches) of snout-to-vent length (SVL) and the males reaching about 40mm (1.6 inches) SVL. It has a rounded snout and a marginally wider head. Its smoothly textured dorsal side is normally of grey, olive, or reddish-brown colour with dark reticulations and lighter-coloured speckles, while its ventral surface is light or cream-coloured with a higher level of granularity. Male frogs exhibit dark specks on the throat. The frog is typically slightly warty in appearance, with grey-coloured flanks. The posterior of the thighs are dark-brown and patterned with yellow and black reticulations. A faint dark stripe runs from the nostril, through the eye, and encircles the darkly coloured tympanum before ending at the shoulder; this stripe is pale and thin in contrast to the closely related stony creek frog and Lesueur's frog, and can be used to distinguish between the species. The armpit is also pale yellow. It has brightly golden-coloured eyes with a dual-shaded iris. The finger and toe discs are relatively well developed and of moderate size, with the length of the second finger exceeding the length of the first. The toes are nearly fully webbed while the fingers lack any form of webbing.

==== Tadpoles ====
The tadpoles develop into a streamlined, or elongated, shape and reach a length of 50mm (2 inches) preceding their complete metamorphosis, which occurs over an average period of 75 days in the summer. Similar to the metamorphosed adults they have a rounded head with golden eyes, although the sides of the iris are more shaded. The mouth is located on the ventral surface with reasonably spaced nostril cavities. The tadpoles' dorsal side is of a dark rusty-brown colour and is patterned with shaded mottling that advances along the tail. There is a dark-brown coloured band across the lower dorsal surface, and the sides present as the same rusty-brown colour but with a metallic copper sheen. In opposition, the ventral surface presents with a golden sheen albeit some darker splotches. The tail itself is of thick muscle that narrows as it approaches the rounded tip, and the tadpoles have a non-arched ventral fin.

=== Species ===
Due to genetic differences found within the Northern Tableland populations and the Central/Southern Tableland populations, some studies have indicated that the lineages should be considered separate evolutionary significant units (ESUs). While current data on genetic and morphological features of the two populations suggests that they fall under the description of a singular species, more research is being conducted so as to evaluate the degree of divergence and whether or not this warrants a classification of two separate subspecies.

== Behaviour ==
=== General ===
==== Adults ====
Generally the Booroolong frogs are stagnant creatures, preferring not to leave the streams into the adjoining landscape. Within a breeding season, individual frogs typically move less than 50m. Booroolong frogs are at their most active during the night, although they can occasionally be found positioned on rocks and basking in the sun beside the stream during the daytime, especially during the summer months. Individuals also enjoy sheltering within cave crevices, grass, or logs. This sheltering occurs with both juvenile and adult frogs within the winter months.

==== Tadpoles ====
Through adaptations to withstand riverine environments, tadpoles are capable of withstanding strong and fast river flows. Additionally, they are able to survive in a variety of water qualities and have been found in streams offsite of agriculturally developed land. Generally, they feed on organic detritus such as algae.

=== Reproductive ===
Males make a quiet "quirk...quirk...quirk" purring call, which occurs for two to three seconds, from beside streams or on bedrock within streams beginning in August, or late winter, through to summer. The species has a high fecundity and a lengthy breeding period. To attract a mate, individuals leave their daytime sheltering sites to call in more exposed areas alongside the stream, but then often retire back to their original sheltering site. An average of about 1,300 eggs are laid in a single adherent clump, attached to or under rocks, within rock pools, or in still sections of streams. Hatching occurs from four to seven days after laying. Tadpoles from northern areas that have completed metamorphosis, or metamorphs, average about 15 mm (0.59 inches), while those in the south measure about 22 mm (0.87 inches). When in captivity, metamorphosis occurs after 75 days, and metamorph frogs closely resemble the adult.

== Habitat ==
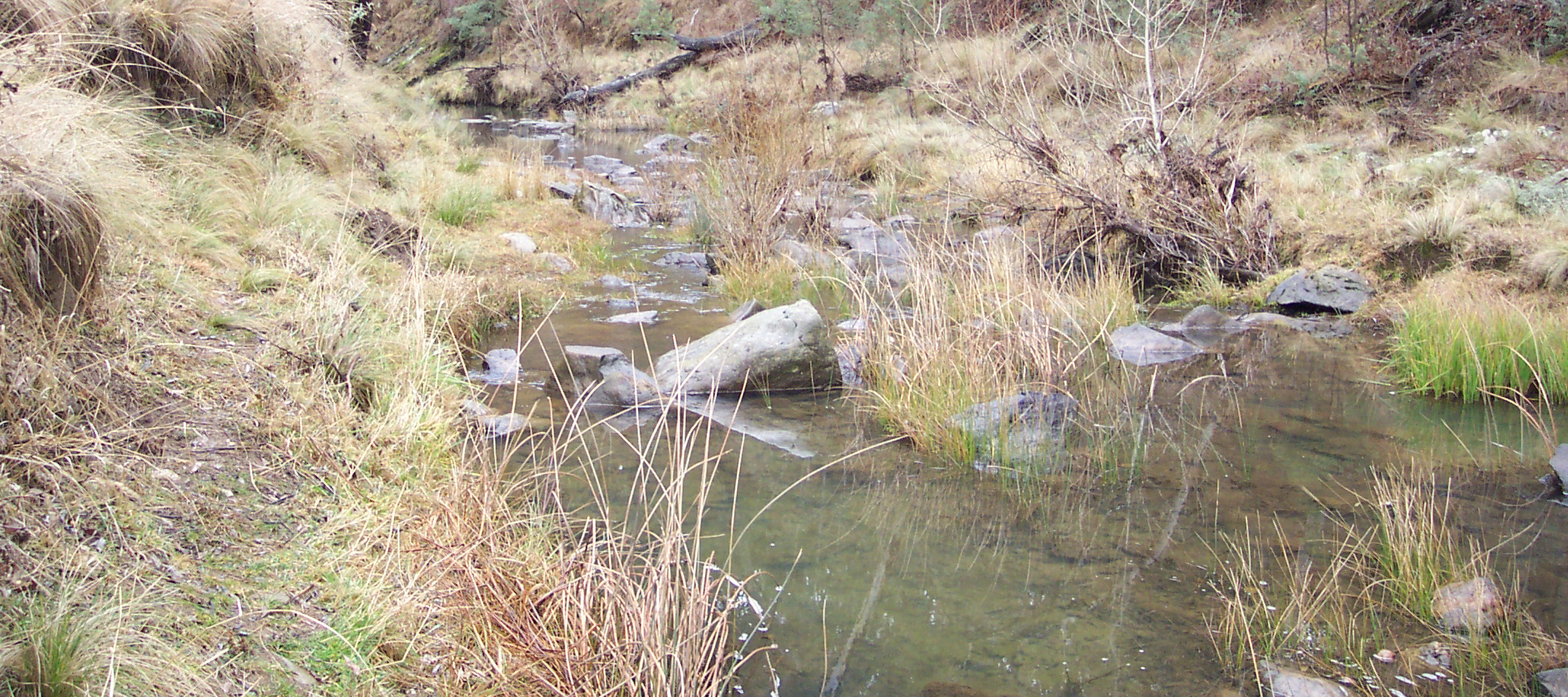
Rocky, westerly flowing streams, like this one near Oberon, are prime habitat of the Booroolong frog.

This species is a stream-dwelling frog, occurring in rocky westerly flowing rivers and streams in highland areas on the Great Dividing Range. These streams are characterised by their borders of grassy vegetation and slow-flowing water. Their habitat is normally associated with open woodlands, but they can also be found in grassland and temperate forest streams, including waterfalls. The permanent flow of water is a necessity for the survival of the species, and ephemeral streams are uninhabitable. Generally, Booroolong frogs greatly prefer headwater streams with a variety of rock sizes, aquatic rock crevices and islands, pools, and rock/gravel rapids. They also prefer areas with a greater level of exposure to sunlight.

== Distribution ==
The Booroolong frog was distributed along eastern Australia, ranging from the Queensland border to the Victorian Border. This species was once abundant in streams above about 200 m (660 ft), until drastic declines began to occur in the mid-1980s in the Northern Tablelands in northern New South Wales. A dramatic population reduction in the mid-1980s and 1990s made it so only a limited amount of the prior distribution range was occupied. Now, at the majority of the remaining sites, there is only a low population of the species present. Although some declines have occurred in the Central Tablelands and Southern Tablelands of New South Wales, they have not been so severe. As of 2021 in the Northern Tablelands, the Booroolong frog has disappeared almost entirely from high elevation streams and is only found in two streams near Tamworth, as well as near Glen Innes in a private dam, with this total area covering only 10 km^{2} (3.9 sq mi). In the Central Tablelands, it is found along the Abercrombie River and Turon River catchment areas. In the southern tablelands, this species is still found along the Tumut River, Yarrangobilly River, and the upper Murray River catchment areas. It was still present at one stream in Victoria in 2021. Each subpopulation, of which there are 28 spanning three regions (Northern, Central, and Southern Tablelands), is forced into isolation from other subpopulations by great areas of unsuitable habitat.

As of February 2023, the species was reported to exist only in the Southern and Central Tablelands of NSW. However, recent floods (2022) had boosted the population.

== Ecology ==
The Booroolong frog plays an important part in the ecosystem by being predators of pest species, and serving as food for native bird and reptiles.

== Conservation ==
The Booroolong frog, as of its 2024 IUCN Red List global assessment, has a conservation status listed as Endangered. Its status was justified due to a continuous decline in habitat, both in quality and extent, as well as a critically fragmented distribution range and a low number of mature individuals.

Declines in population have been the most prevalent within the Northern Tableland region, with the majority of the subpopulations being extirpated entirely. This has caused the Northern population to approach complete regional extinction. Multiple surveys have also indicated that the Central Tableland population has also faced a dramatic decline. The Southern Tableland region now holds the majority of the subpopulations, most of which face the threat of local extinction, where they reside in 27 different streams. The introduction of fish, such as trout, and the chytrid fungus are believed to be the main causes for decline. Additionally, the Booroolong frog has a short generation length as well as a significantly high annual adult mortality rate of over 90 percent.

The Booroolong frog was assessed to meet the criteria for endangerment under the EPBC Act in five locations:

1. Glenn Innes, NSW
2. Naomi catchment, Hunter catchment, and Manning catchment
3. Central West catchment
4. Murrumbidgee catchment
5. Murray catchment

Over the 40 years prior to 2023, it was estimated that numbers had been dropping until there were only around 5,000 frogs left in the wild.

=== Threats ===
The declining numbers of the species are due to a variety of threats, most of which are either direct or indirect consequences of human intervention. Direct consequences stem from agricultural practices such as wood/pulp plantations and livestock farming, as well as human manipulation of the natural environment such as mining/quarrying practices, dams, and other water management techniques. Although many of these techniques are now out of practice, they have resulted in consequences that are still ongoing today, such as changes to the stream's flow, as well as the introduction of new fish species which exert predatory pressure on the Booroolong tadpoles. Indirect consequences also often stem from these human interventions, including forest and water pollution as well as climate change-created droughts. Since the Booroolong frog is reliant on flowing-water to breed, their populations are exceptionally liable to droughts. In addition to human-created threats, the Booroolong frog is facing environmental threats such as invasive diseases. Introduced species of tree such as the willow have also destroyed habitat.

Specifically, the species is suffering the most widespread decline as a result of Batrachochytrium dendrobatidis, or Bd, a parasitic chytrid fungus which causes a fungal infection of the skin, known as chytridiomycosis, inhibiting the frog from maintaining osmotic balance. Frogs exposed to Bd do not develop immunity, and can suffer from repeat infections. A 2010 study ran by M. McFadden indicated a large record of chytridiomycosis within the released population of captive-bred frogs. Within the study, 610 two- to four-month-old captive-bred Booroolong frogs were released in a 1.5km section of a creek and then monitored intermittently over the course of two years. Following observation, 105 frogs were re-captured with only 29 surviving to reach sexual maturity and participate in breeding behaviours. Another naturally occurring threat that diminishes the Booroolong frog population is the increased frequency of bushfires. These bushfires create increased water temperatures as well as sedimentary runoff which fills in rock crevices and reduces areas of refuge in areas even 80km downstream. While these threats have all been individually rated as a 3 (low impact) on the IUCN impact scale, their combined destruction is responsible for the large reduction in population.

=== Efforts ===
The range of the Booroolong frog covers multiple protected areas, and while there has been some development of a management plan, further research, existing population protection, and habitat rehabilitation is necessary to prevent a further decline and eventual extinction.

The NSW state government developed the national recovery plan for the Booroolong frog in 2012, and it was then adopted under Australia's EPBC Act. The plan expired in 2022. It sets forth a multitude of conservation actions to prevent habitat loss and disturbance, respond to bushfires, and to prioritise the management of invasive species and disease.

The plans to prevent habitat disturbance involve using habitat modeling to identify essential population areas and ensure their protection while increasing breeding opportunities by maintaining the persistence of stream-flow. Many of the plans place a focus on reforming and setting limitations on human habitat intervention, such as by minimising inappropriate usage of heavy machinery, ensuring quality road construction, and designating protection zones which encircle breeding sites. Prevention of access to waterways by livestock is also an important conservation measure. In an effort to develop a better response to bushfires, plans include ensuring the protection of unburnt areas adjacent to areas impacted by the fire, as well as conducting surveys to establish a baseline of population response. To manage the impacts of invasive species, there are set-movements towards trout-stocking restriction/eradication as well as using fencing around the Booroolong frogs' habitats or other preventative measures. In efforts to minimise the spread of Bd, the recovery plan encourages a further investigation into the frogs' Bd resistance. The identified resistance mechanics would then have the potential to be utilised in selective breeding efforts, creating and releasing Bd-resistant frogs. Additionally, protocols to prevent against the spread of Bd such as improved disease identification and adoption of enhanced hygiene practices would be set into place.

Generally, the plan involves close monitoring of the Booroolong frogs, identification of threats, and adoption of captive breeding methods where possible. Following the expiry of the plan, however, there is no recommendation from the Committee to develop a new plan, as it was deemed to have no critical conservation advantage.
