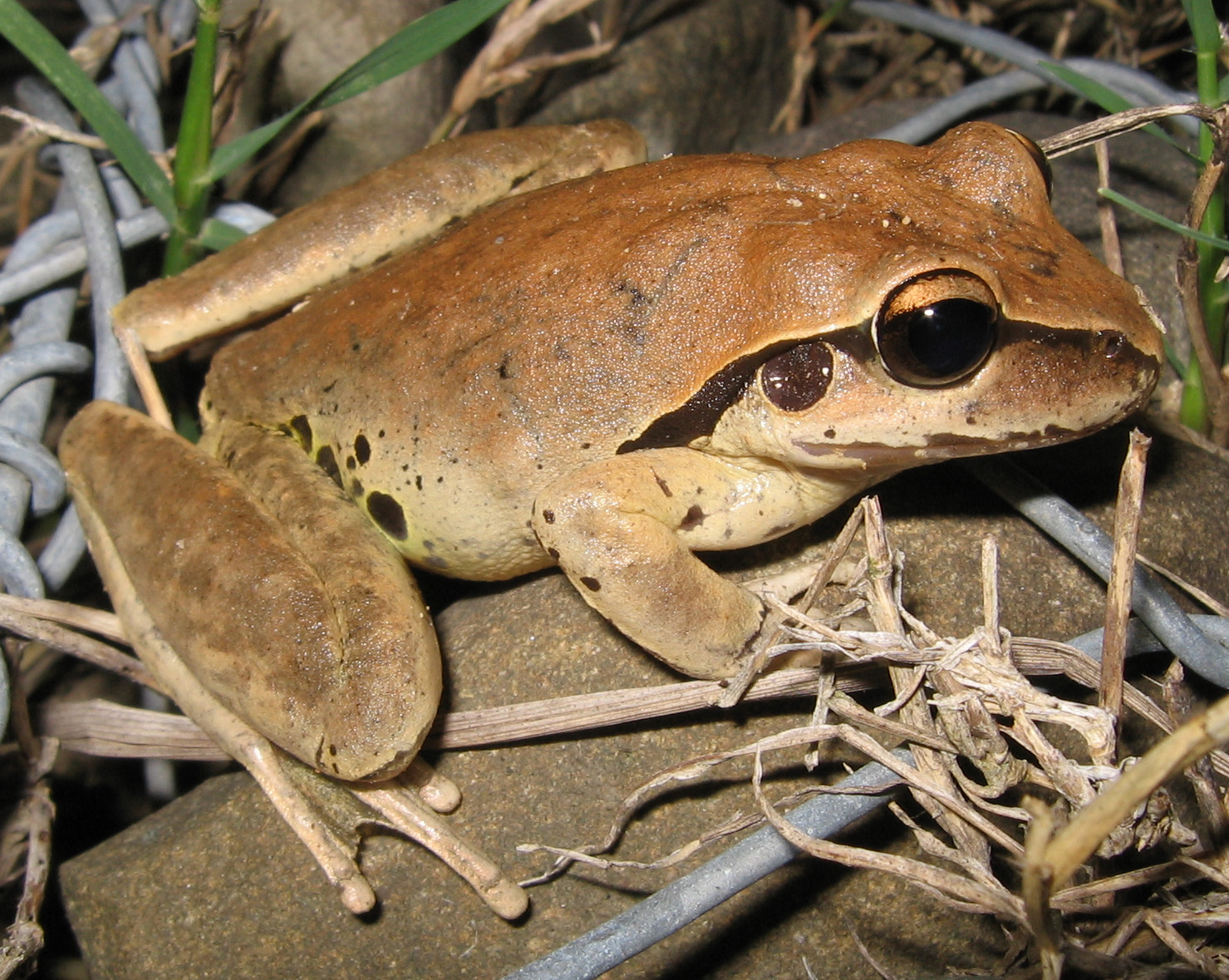
- Female Rhyaconastes wilcoxii in the Stratford, New South Wales, Australia

Scientific classification
- Kingdom: Animalia
- Phylum: Chordata
- Class: Amphibia
- Order: Anura
- Family: Pelodryadidae
- Genus: Rhyaconastes; Mahony, Donnellan & Richards, 2025

Species
- Rhyaconastes booroolongensis (Moore, 1961); Rhyaconastes jungguy (Donnellan and Mahony, 2004); Rhyaconastes lesueurii (Duméril and Bibron, 1841); Rhyaconastes wilcoxii (Günther, 1864)

= Rhyaconastes =

Genus of amphibians

Rhyaconastes is a genus of frogs in the family Pelodryadidae. These frogs are native to streams and rivers in eastern Australia. Species in the genus were previously included within the wastebasket genus Litoria, but were separated into a new genus in 2025. They are medium to large frogs (females are often significantly larger than males) characterised by a dull brown colour, though breeding males of all species excluding the Booroolong frog are bright yellow during breeding season nights .

The genus is named from the Greek rhyakos, meaning "stream or torrent", and nastes meaning "inhabitant".
