= Yarrangobilly River =

Yarrangobilly Heads of Yarrangobilly River
- Location of the Yarrangobilly River mouth in New South Wales

Location
- Country: Australia
- State: New South Wales
- Region: Australian Alps (IBRA), Snowy Mountains
- LGA: Snowy Valleys Council

Physical characteristics
- Source: Fiery Range
  - location: near Kennedy Ridge
  - coordinates: 35°39′S 148°30′E
  - elevation: 1,490 m (4,890 ft)
- Mouth: Talbingo Reservoir
  - location: Tobo Hole
  - coordinates: 35°46′S 148°21′E
- Length: 50 km (31 mi)

Basin features
- River system: Murrumbidgee catchment, Murray–Darling basin
- National park: Kosciuszko NP

The Yarrangobilly River is a perennial river of the Murrumbidgee River catchment within the Murray–Darling basin, located in the Snowy Mountains region of New South Wales, Australia.

== Course and features ==
The Yarrangobilly River rises on the Fiery Range near the Kennedy Ridge, approximately 4 kilometres (2.5 mi) west southwest of Peppercorn Hill, within the Kosciuszko National Park. The river flows generally southwest, before spilling into Talbingo Reservoir at Tobo Hall, formed by the impounding of the Tumut River via Talbingo Dam. The river descends 935 metres (3,068 ft) over its 50-kilometre (31 mi) course.

The Snowy Mountains Highway crosses the river at the locality of Yarrangobilly.

=== Recreation ===
One of the main visitor access points to the river is the Yarrangobilly Caves area. At the side of the river is a thermal pool which is 20 metres (66 ft) long and up to 2.5 metres (8 ft 2 in) deep. The pool is fed by a warm-water spring which maintains the temperature at 27 °C (81 °F). Walking tracks along the river include River Walk and Castle Walk which leads to the Yarrangobilly Caves; as well as the Glory Farm track which leads to the remnants of Henry Harris' Glory Hole Farm. Other recreational activities include fishing, canoeing and rafting.

=== Fauna ===
The endangered Booroolong Frog was historically recorded in the Yarrangobilly River, but it is believed that the population may have disappeared due to the infectious disease Chytridiomycosis. The introduced rainbow trout is found in the river, a result of the stocking of local water bodies from the Gaden Trout Hatchery at Jindabyne by the Monaro Acclimatisation Society.

== See also ==
- List of rivers of New South Wales (L–Z)
- List of rivers of Australia
- Rivers of New South Wales
