= Charles Alexandre Lesueur =

French naturalist, artist, and explorer (1778–1846)

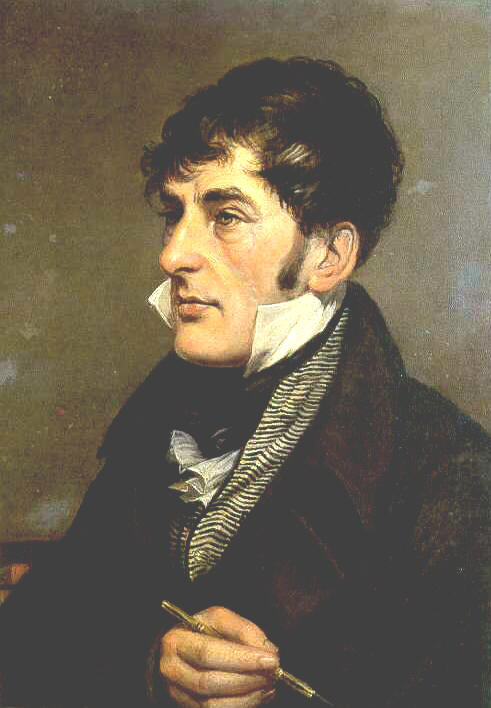
- Lesueur in 1818, painted by Charles Willson Peale
- Born: 1 January 1778; Le Havre, France
- Died: 12 December 1846 (aged 67); Le Havre, France
- Scientific career
- Fields: Naturalist

Charles Alexandre Lesueur (French pronunciation: [ʃaʁl alɛksɑ̃dʁ ləsɥœʁ]; 1 January 1778 in Le Havre – 12 December 1846 in Le Havre) was a French naturalist, artist, and explorer. He was a prolific natural-history collector, gathering many type specimens in Australia, Southeast Asia, and North America, and was also responsible for describing numerous species, including the spiny softshell turtle (Apalone spinifera), smooth softshell turtle (A. mutica), and common map turtle (Graptemys geographica). Both Mount Lesueur and Lesueur National Park in Western Australia are named in his honor.

== Early life ==
Charles Alexandre Lesueur was born on 1 January 1778, to Jean-Baptiste Denis Lesueur and Charlotte Thieullent. Charlotte died when Charles was sixteen years old, and Charles' maternal grandmother took care of him and his siblings. Charles attended the Collège du Havre and possibly the Ecole publique des mathématiques et d'hydrographie. He was in military service in a cadet battalion at age fifteen and was in the National Guard of Le Havre from 1797 to 1799. He joined the French Marines or Navy but was discharged for medical reasons. He then joined Nicolas Baudin's expedition, nominally as a gunner on the ship Géographe.

== Career ==
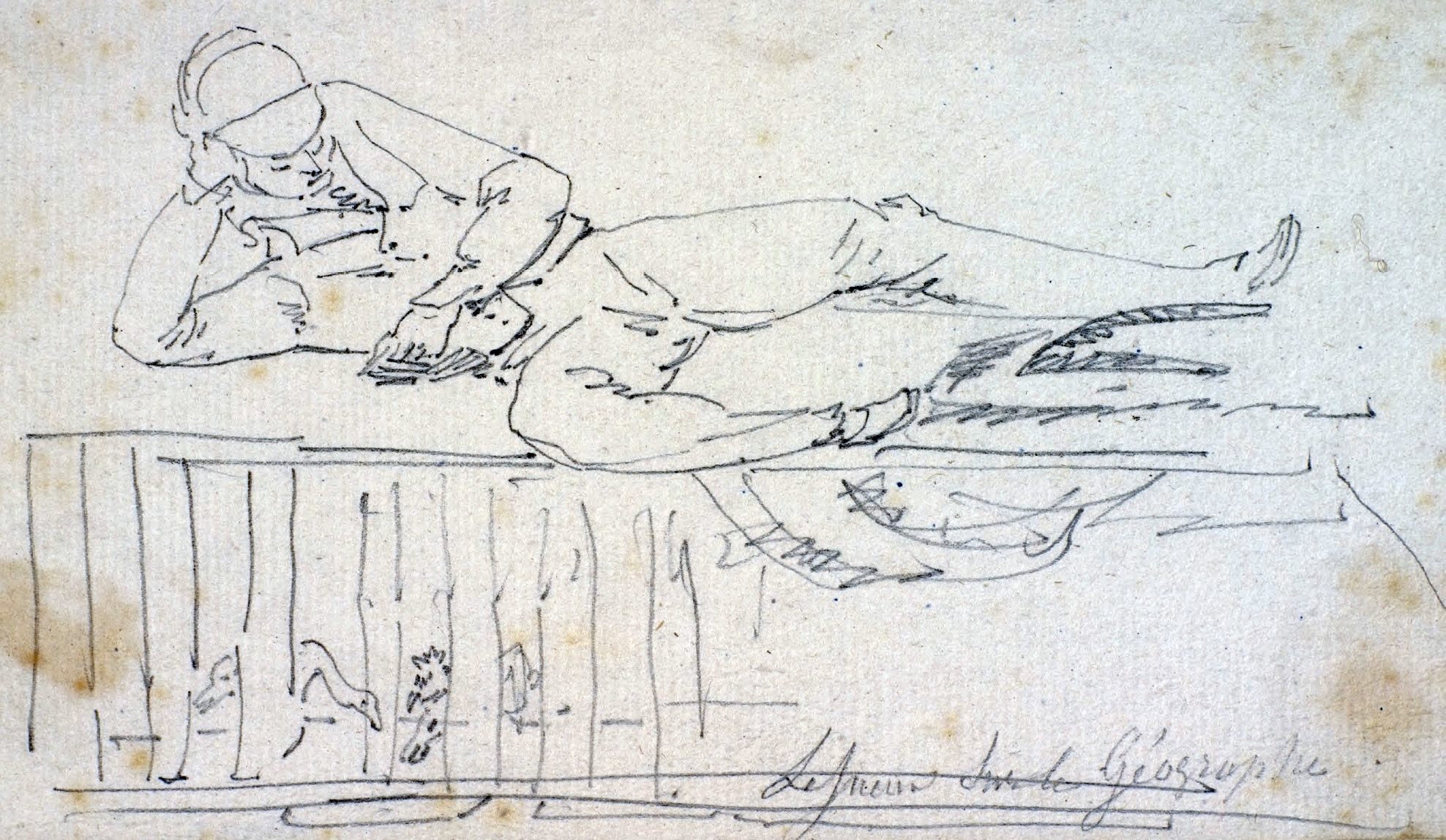
Self portrait from le Géographe

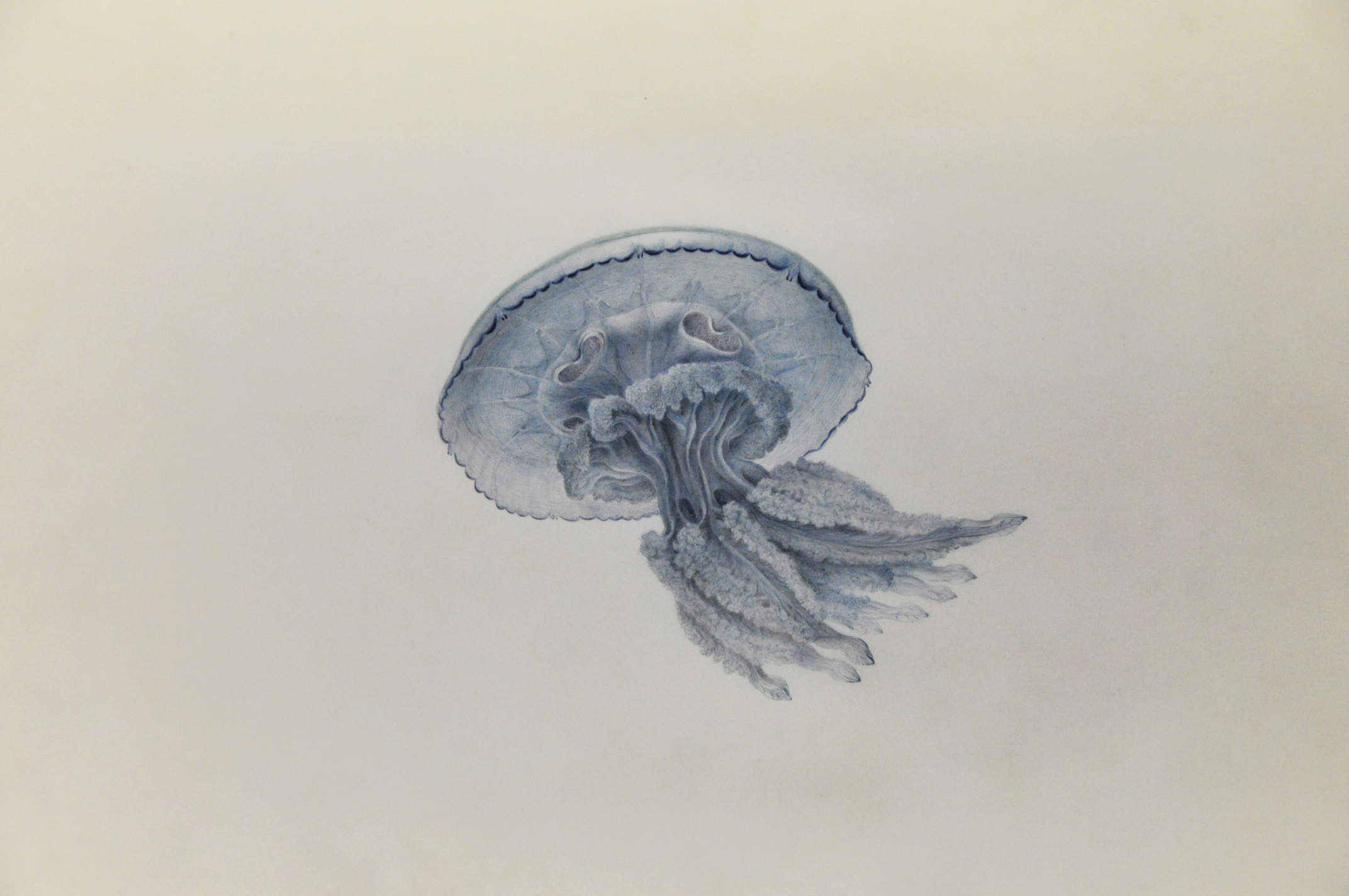
Drawing of jellyfish by Lesueur

In 1801, Lesueur traveled to Australia on the expedition of Nicolas Baudin, assuming the duties of expedition artist alongside Nicolas-Martin Petit when the erstwhile appointed artists disembarked in France. With François Péron, he took over the duties as naturalist after the death of the expedition's zoologist René Maugé. Together, they collected over 100,000 zoological specimens. In 1802, he made the only known sketches of the King Island emu in its natural habitat (the bird became extinct in 1822).

Between May 1816 and early 1837, he lived and traveled widely in the United States, particularly in Tennessee, Kentucky, and Missouri. He was elected a member of the American Philosophical Society in 1817. In 1833, he visited Vincennes, Indiana, where he sketched the first known drawing of Grouseland, the mansion of William Henry Harrison. The mansion is today a National Historic Landmark.

From 1826 to 1837, Lesueur was based in New Harmony, Indiana, where he filled sketchbooks full of the finds discovered during the utopian adventure funded by his friend and former employer, American geologist William Maclure. He arrived in the boat Philanthropist (which he also sketched) with other intellectuals who came to live in the small town of New Harmony, on the Wabash River. He took research trips (including series of six flat-boat trips to New Orleans) and sketched people, small towns, and scenes continuously. He was in New Harmony when Prince Maximilian, Prince of Wied-Neuweid, Germany, and artist Karl Bodmer came to spend five months there in 1832–1833. Prince Maximilian said of Lesueur, "He had explored the country in many directions, was acquainted with everything remarkable, collected and prepared all interesting objects, and had already sent considerable collections to France." Indeed, Lesueur sent specimens of unique fish, animals, and fossils, as well as artifacts he had dug from the Indian Mounds in New Harmony, back to France, where they remain.

Lesueur returned to France in 1837, only after his friends Thomas Say and Joseph Barabino had died and William MacClure had returned to Philadelphia, accompanied by many of his fine books. He had spent 21 years in the United States, but continued his scholarly studies and activities in France, where he resumed his occupation of artist-naturalist and began to catalogue his extensive research and artwork. At last, he was awarded the honor of Chevalier de l’Ordre Royal de la Légion d'honneur for his long years of work in the sciences.

In March 1846, Lesueur was appointed curator of the Musée d'Histoire Naturelle du Havre. Nine months later, he died suddenly (12 December 1846) and was buried at Le Havre. In the 1900s, his work was finally published by the museum, totaling over 60 books, including reports of his zoological, geological, historical, and archaeological research, as well as studies of his life. Pictured here is the oil portrait by Charles Willson Peale of Lesueur. The original hangs in the reading room of the Ewell Sale Stewart Library in the Academy of Natural Sciences of Philadelphia.

== Gallery ==
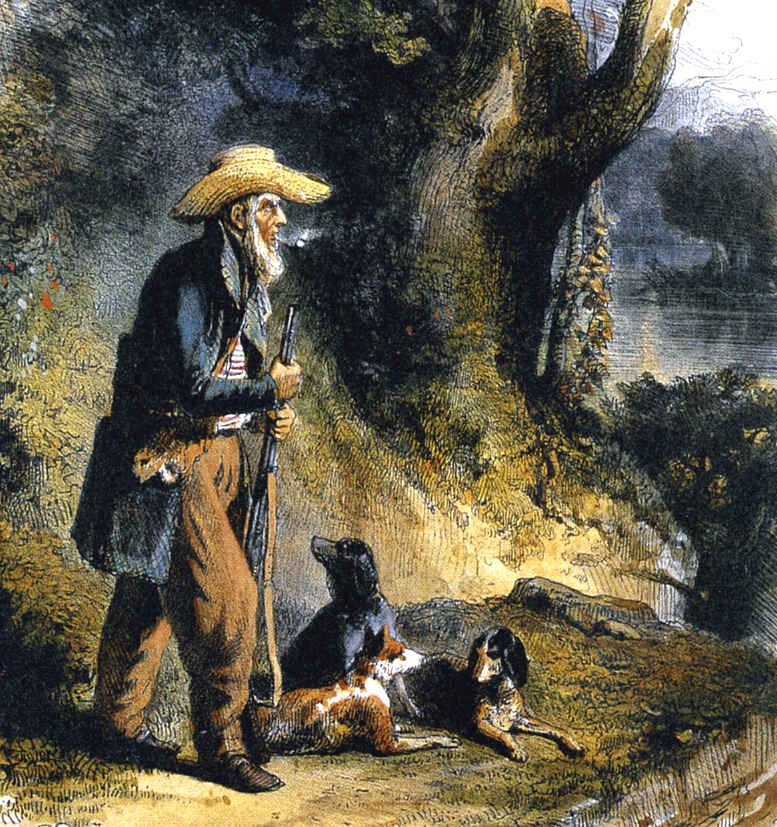
The Great Traveller Charles Alexandre Lesueur in the Forest Lithograph after the watercolor: Lesueur, the Naturalist at New Harmony by Karl Bodmer, c. 1832–1834

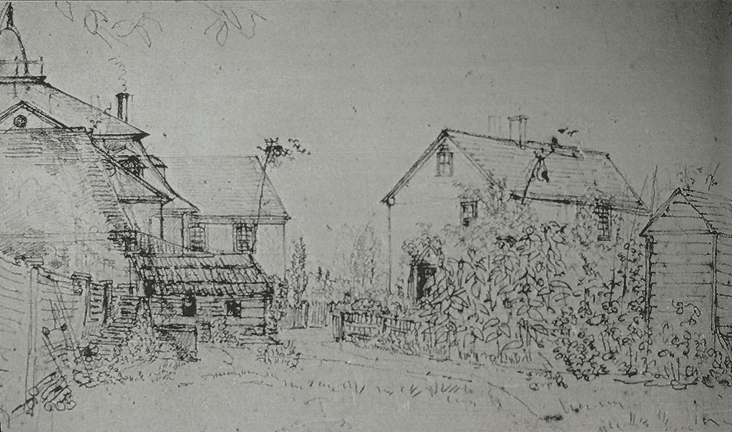
New Harmony, Indiana, in 1831, sketch from Charles Alexandre Lesueur

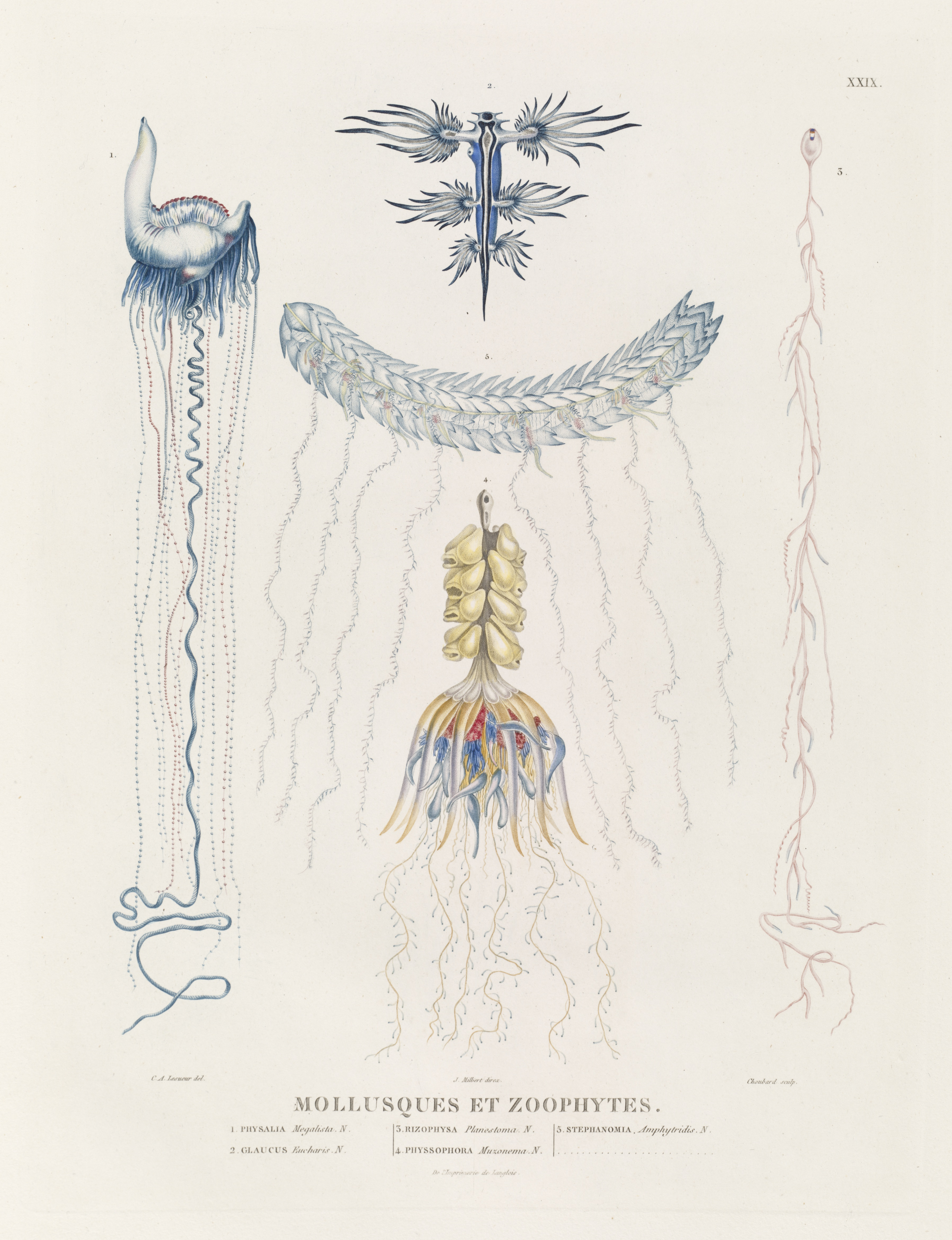
Molluscs and Zoophytes, Charles Alexandre Lesueur, from Voyage of Discovery to the Southern Lands, 1807

== Eponyms ==
One species of frog, two species of lizards, and a species of jellyfish were named in honour of Lesueur (the last also honoring François Péron, also of the Baudin expedition):

- Litoria lesueurii (A.M.C. Duméril & Bibron, 1841) – Lesueur's frog (Hylidae)
- Amalosia lesueurii (A.M.C. Duméril & Bibron, 1836) – Lesueur's velvet gecko (Diplodactylidae)
- Intellagama lesueurii (Gray, 1831) – eastern water dragon (Agamidae)
- Phyllorhiza peronlesuerui Goy 1990 – a jellyfish (Mastigiidae)

== Published works ==
- Le Sueur, C. A. 1817. Descriptions of six new Species of the genus Firola, observed by Messrs. Le Sueur and Péron in the Mediterranean Sea, in the months of March and April, 1809. Journal of the Academy of Natural Sciences of Philadelphia 1, 3–8.
- Le Sueur, C. A. 1817. Characters of a new genus, and descriptions of three new species upon which it is formed; discovered in the Atlantic Ocean, in the months of March and April, 1816. Journal of the Academy of Natural Sciences of Philadelphia 1(3), 37–41. (Read 15 April 1817) (BHL link)
- Le Sueur, C. A. 1817. Descriptions of three new species of the genus Raja. Journal of the Academy of Natural Sciences of Philadelphia 1(3), 41–43. (Read 1 July 1817) (BHL link)
- Le Sueur, C. A. 1817. Descriptions of two new species of the genus Gadus. Journal of the Academy of Natural Sciences of Philadelphia 1(5), 83–85. (Read 26 August 1817) (BHL link)
- Le Sueur, C. A. 1817. Descriptions of a new species of the genus Cyprinus. Journal of the Academy of Natural Sciences of Philadelphia 1(5), 85–86. (Read 19 August 1817) (BHL link)
- Le Sueur, C. A. 1817. An account of an American species of Tortoise, not noticed in the systems. Journal of the Academy of Natural Sciences of Philadelphia 1(5), 86–88. (Read 23 September 1817) (BHL link)
- Le Sueur, C. A. 1817. A new genus of Fishes, of the order Abdominales, proposed, under the name of Catostomus; and the characters of this genus, with those of its species, indicated. Part 1. Journal of the Academy of Natural Sciences of Philadelphia 1(5), 88–96. (Read 16 September 1817) (BHL link)
- Le Sueur, C. A. 1817. A new genus of Fishes, of the order Abdominales, proposed, under the name of Catostomus; and the characters of this genus, with those of its species, indicated. Part 2. Journal of the Academy of Natural Sciences of Philadelphia 1(6), 102–111. (Read 16 September 1817) (BHL link)
- Le Sueur, C. A. 1817. Descriptions of four new species, and two varieties, of the genus Hydrargira. Journal of the Academy of Natural Sciences of Philadelphia 1(6), 125–134. (Read 21 October 1817) (BHL link)
- Le Sueur, C. A. 1817. Observations on several species of the genus Actinia; illustrated by figures. Part 1. Journal of the Academy of Natural Sciences of Philadelphia 1(6), 149–154. (Read 21 October 1817) (BHL link)
- Le Sueur, C. A. 1817. Observations on several species of the genus Actinia; illustrated by figures. Part 2. Journal of the Academy of Natural Sciences of Philadelphia 1(6), 169–189. (Read 21 October 1817) (BHL link)
- Le Sueur, C. A. 1818. Descriptions of several new species of North American fishes. Part 1. Journal of the Academy of Natural Sciences of Philadelphia 1, 222–235. (Read 3 March 1818) (BHL link)
- Le Sueur, C. A. 1818. Observations on a new genus of fossil shells. Journal of the Academy of Natural Sciences of Philadelphia 1, 310–313. (Read 30 June 1818) (BHL link)
- Le Sueur, C. A. 1818. Descriptions of several new species of North American fishes. Part 2. Journal of the Academy of Natural Sciences of Philadelphia 1, 359–365. (Read 3 March 1818) (BHL link)
- Le Sueur, C. A. 1818. Description of several new species of the genus Esox, of North America. Journal of the Academy of Natural Sciences of Philadelphia 1, 413–417. (Read 3 March 1818) (BHL link)
- Le Sueur, C. A. 1823. Descriptions of several new species of Ascidia. Journal of the Academy of Natural Sciences of Philadelphia 3, 2–8. (Read 25 March 1822)

== See also ==
- Category:Taxa named by Charles Alexandre Lesueur
- European and American voyages of scientific exploration
- Natural History Museum of Le Havre
