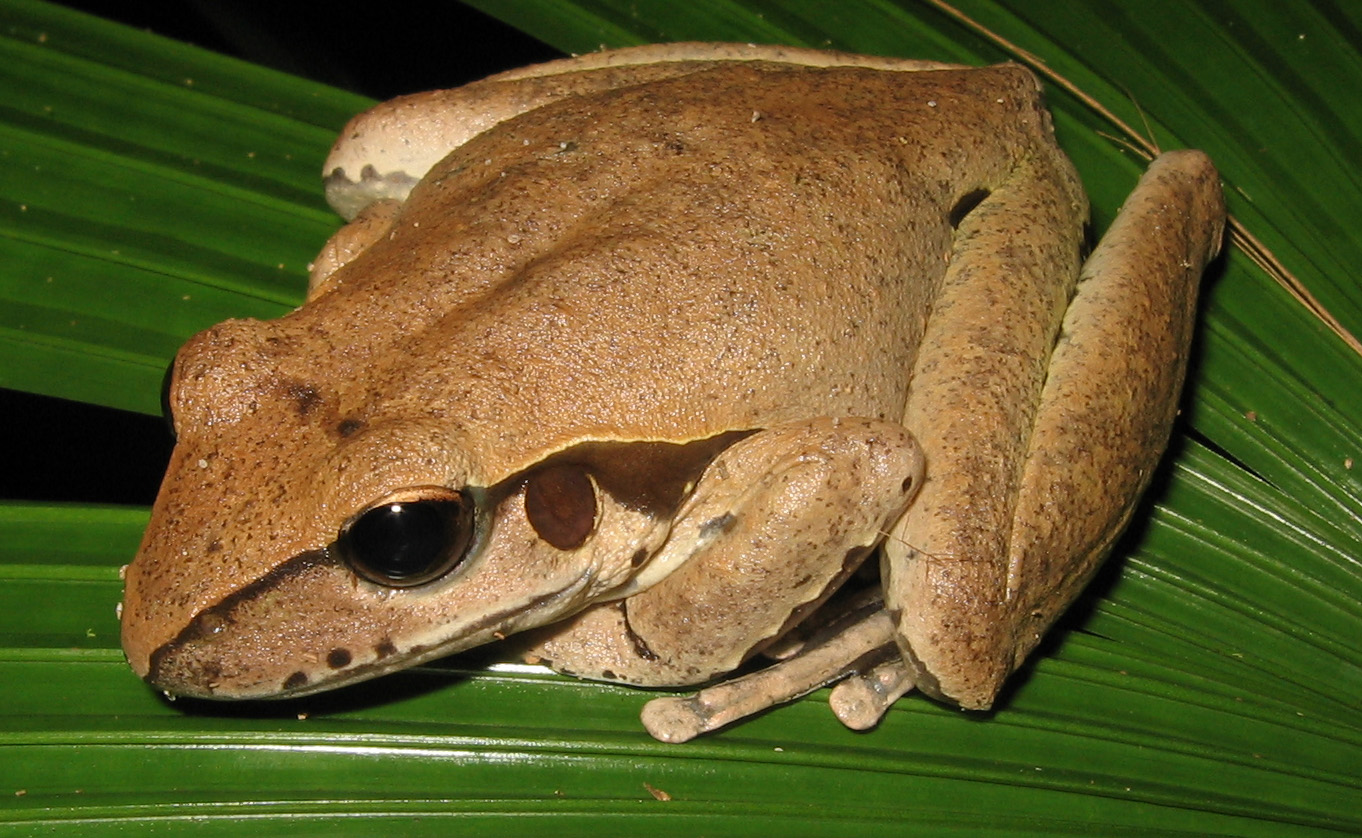

Conservation status
- Least Concern (IUCN 3.1)

Scientific classification
- Kingdom: Animalia
- Phylum: Chordata
- Class: Amphibia
- Order: Anura
- Family: Pelodryadidae
- Genus: Rhyaconastes
- Species: R. jungguy

Binomial name
- Rhyaconastes jungguy (Donnellan & Mahony, 2004)

Synonyms
- Litoria jungguy (Donnellan & Mahony, 2004); Ranoidea jungguy

= Rhyaconastes jungguy =

Species of frog

Rhyaconastes jungguy is a species of frog in the family Pelodryadidae, endemic to north-eastern Australia. Its natural habitats are subtropical or tropical moist lowland forests and rivers, and it is threatened by habitat loss.
