= Perisher =

Perisher may refer to:

- Perisher Ski Resort, formerly known as Perisher Blue, a ski resort in the Australian Snowy Mountains, New South Wales
- Perisher Valley, New South Wales, a village within the Perisher ski resort
- Submarine Command Course, a training course run by the Royal Navy and Royal Netherlands Navy, nicknamed "Perisher" for the high failure rate

== See also ==
- The Perishers
