= Smiggin Holes =

- Town
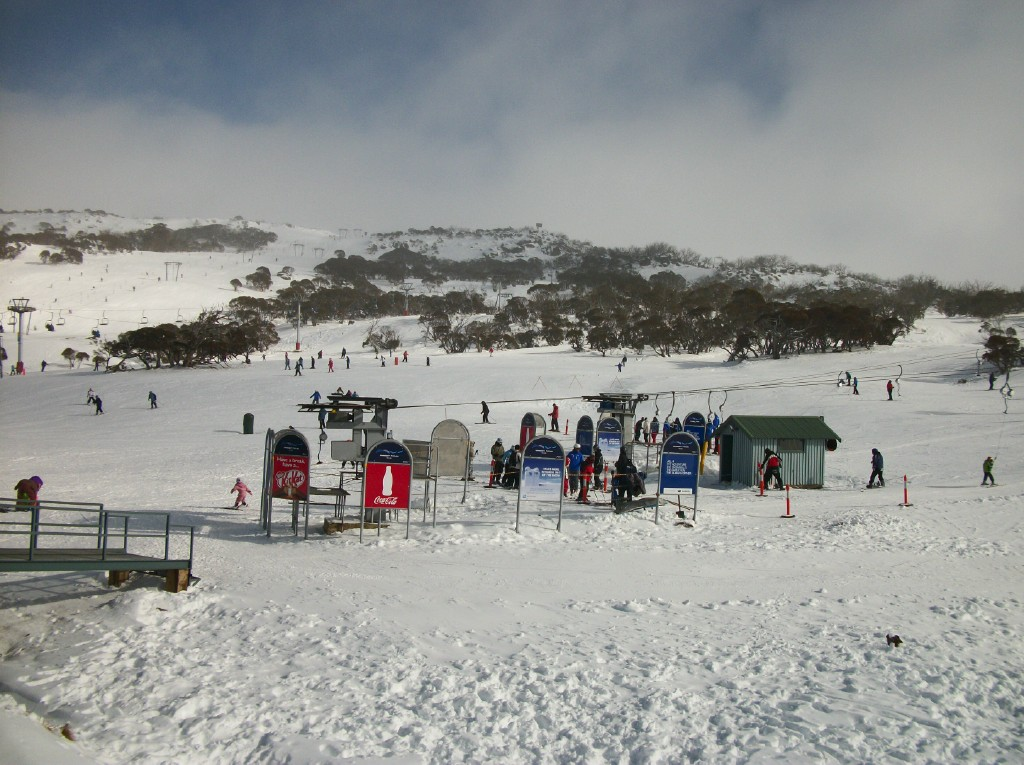
- Smiggin Holes Ski Resort, 2010

- Coordinates: 36°23′40″S 148°25′45″E
- Country: Australia
- State: New South Wales
- LGA: Snowy Monaro Regional Council
- Location: 490 km (300 mi) SW of Sydney; 209 km (130 mi) SSW of Canberra; 92 km (57 mi) WSW of Cooma; 32 km (20 mi) W of Jindabyne; 270 km (170 mi) NNE of Bairnsdale
- Established: 1939

Government
  - State electorate: Monaro
  - Federal division: Eden-Monaro
- Elevation: 1,680 m (5,510 ft)
- Postcode: 2624

Smiggin Holes is a village in the ski resort area of Snowy Mountains of New South Wales, Australia, in the Snowy Monaro Regional Council. It is primarily a winter-only resort village. It is within the Kosciuszko National Park, and is administered by New South Wales Department of Environment and Climate Change. Access to the village is via road. There is an access fee payable to the national park, and motor vehicles are not permitted to stay overnight in the winter months.

Smiggin Holes is one of four villages making up the Perisher Ski Resort. It is situated 1,680 metres (5,510 ft) above sea level.

The name Smiggin Holes is of Scottish origin. The trampling of hundreds of cattle consuming rock salt that graziers had placed there, caused depressions that filled with water. These depressions were called "the smiggin holes". The year 1939 signified the start of Smiggin Holes as a destination for skiers. Smiggin Holes is widely regarded as one of the best beginners' ski resorts on the Australian snowfields. The snow bowl is relatively sheltered, which protect it from harsh weather, avoiding the harsher weather experienced across the wider Snowy Mountains. A cafe was established to service skiers en route to Charlotte Pass and Mount Kosciuszko.

== Skiing ==
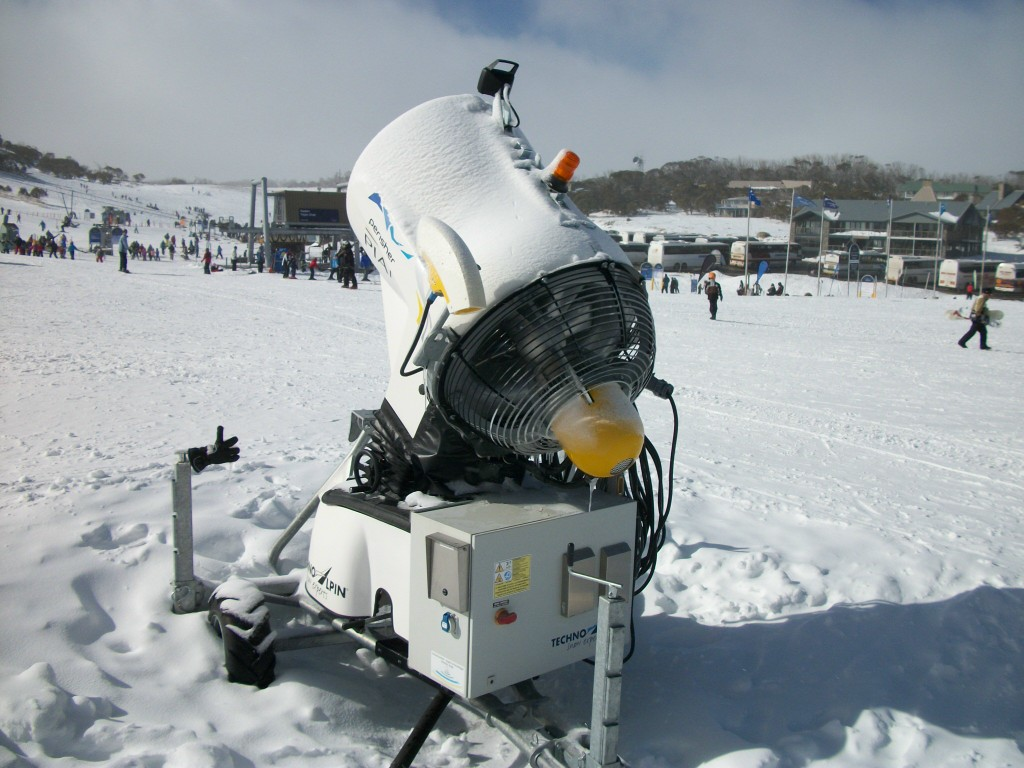
A snow making machine at Smiggin Holes.

The Hotel Kosciuszko was opened by the New South Wales Government in 1909 at what is now Sponars Chalet, near Smiggin Holes. The first Kosciuszko Chalet was built at Charlotte Pass in 1930, giving relatively comfortable access to Australia's highest terrain. The growing number of ski enthusiasts heading to Charlotte Pass led to the establishment of a cafe at Smiggin Holes around 1939, where horse-drawn sleighs would deliver skiers to be begin the arduous ski to the Kosciusko Chalet. It was the construction of the vast Snowy Mountains Hydro-Electric Scheme from 1949 that really opened up the Snowy Mountains for large scale development of a ski industry and led to the establishment of Thredbo and Perisher as leading Australian resorts. The Construction of Guthega Dam brought skiers to the isolated Guthega district and a rope tow was installed there in 1957.

The last establishment of a major skifield in New South Wales came with the development of Mount Blue Cow in the 1980s. In 1987 the Skitube opened to deliver skiers from Bullocks Flat, on the Alpine Way, to Perisher Valley and to Blue Cow, which also opened in 1987. The operators of Blue Cow purchased Guthega in 1991, and the new combined resort later merged with Perisher-Smiggins to become the largest ski resort in the Southern Hemisphere. In 2009 Perisher had 48 lifts covering 1,245 hectares (3,080 acres) and four village base areas: Perisher Valley, Blue Cow, Smiggin Holes and Guthega.

== Media ==
During the 2002 Winter Olympics Roy & HG ran a mock campaign for Smiggin Holes to host the next available Winter Olympics on The Ice Dream television program.

== See also ==
- Skiing in Australia
