= Blue Cow Mountain =

Ski resort in New South Wales, Australia

Blue Cow
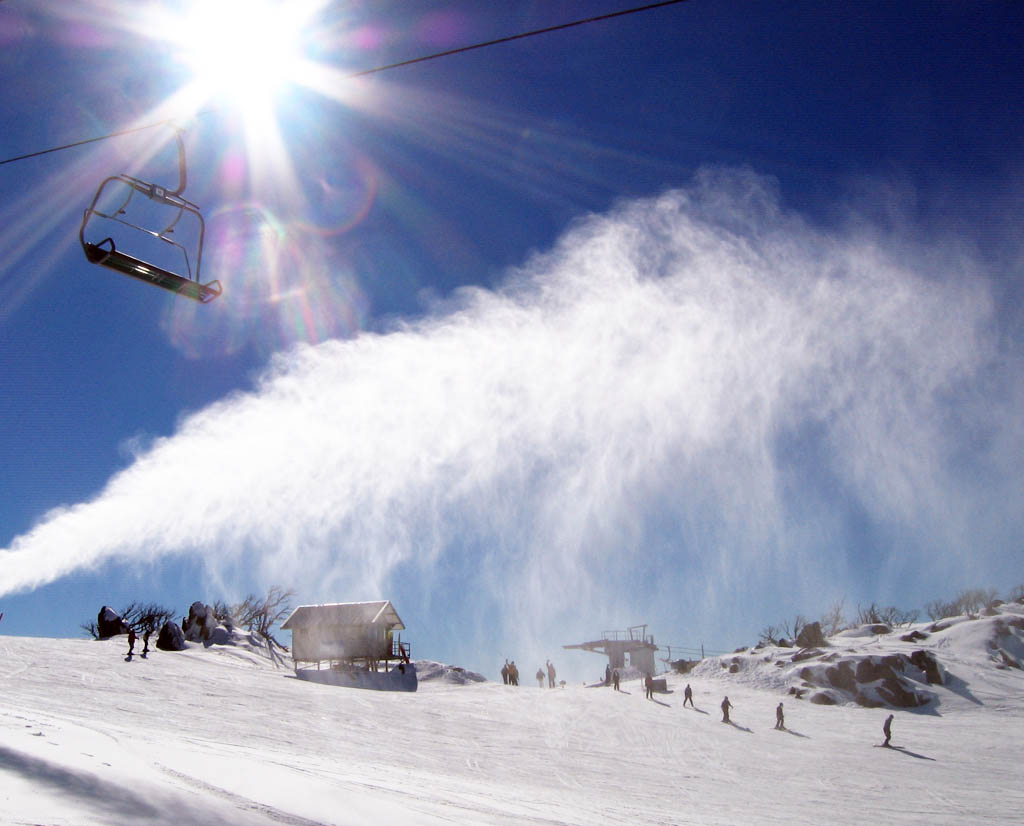
- Mount Blue Cow is one of the four village bases of Perisher Ski Resort
- Interactive map of Blue Cow
- Location: Snowy Mountains, New South Wales, Australia
- Nearest city: Canberra
- Coordinates: 36°22′S 148°24′E
- Vertical: 355 m (1,165 ft)
- Top elevation: 1,890 m (6,200 ft)
- Base elevation: 1,605 m (5,266 ft)
- Skiable area: 1,245 ha (3,080 acres)
- Longest run: 3 km (1.9 mi)
- Total length: over 100 km (62 mi)
- Lift system: 48 lifts
- Lift capacity: passengers/hr
- Terrain parks: Kosciuszko National Park
- Website: www.erisher.com.au

Blue Cow Mountain
- The Blue Cow; Mount Blue Cow
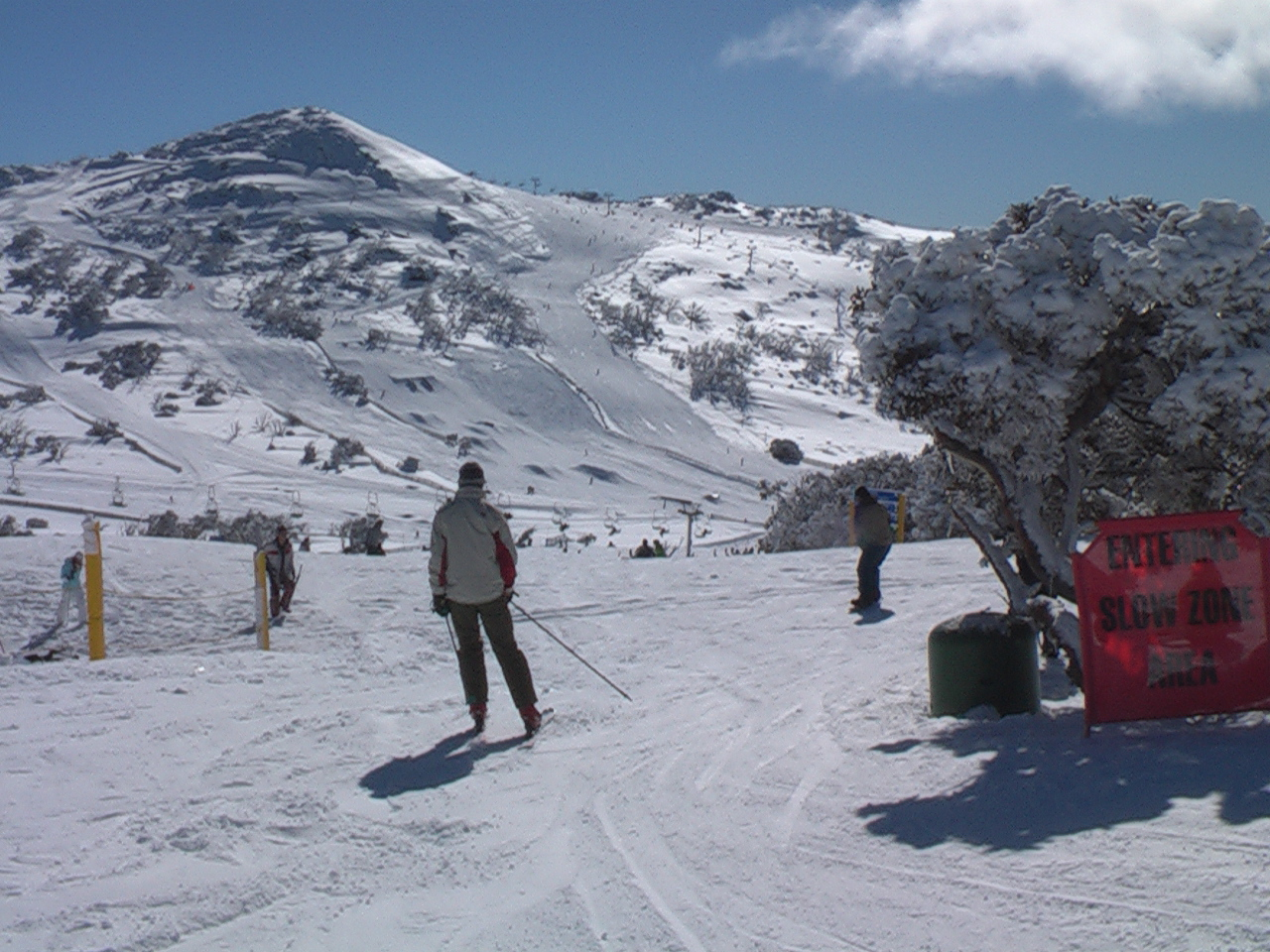
- Looking towards the summit from outside Blue Cow Terminal

Highest point
- Elevation: 1,901 m (6,237 ft); AHD
- Parent peak: Mount Kosciuszko
- Listing: Mountains of New South Wales
- Coordinates: 36°22′S 148°23′E

Geography
- Location within New South Wales
- Country: Australia
- State: New South Wales
- Parent range: Snowy Mountains
- Topo map: Geehi Dam

Blue Cow is a ski resort that is part of Perisher located in the Snowy Mountains of New South Wales, Australia, within the Snowy Monaro Regional Council. The resort is situated within the Kosciuszko National Park and is administered by the NSW National Parks & Wildlife Service. During winter months, the only access to the village is via the Skitube underground railway. In summer, access is via off-road only. Blue Cow is one of the four resort bases within Perisher, Australia's largest ski resort.

Also known as the Blue Cow Mountain, Mount Blue Cow or The Blue Cow, the mountain lies within the Main Range of Snowy Mountains, part of the Great Dividing Range. Blue Cow Mountain has an elevation of 1,901 metres (6,237 ft) above sea level.

== History ==
Blue Cow was developed by Fritz Feiersinger and Transfield, each owning 50%. Construction commenced in December 1985 with it officially opened by Premier of New South Wales Nick Greiner 29 August 1988.

== Skiing ==
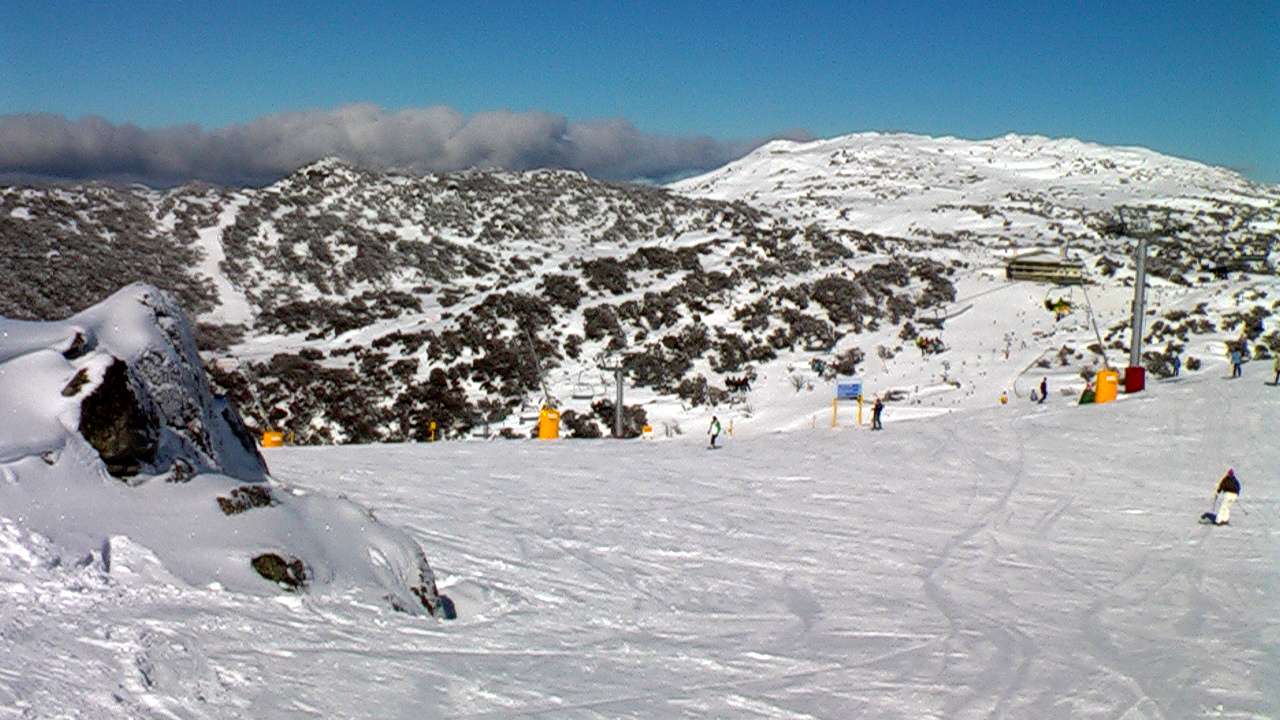
Looking back from summit of Ridge Quad Chair towards Blue Cow Terminal

The last establishment of a major skifield in New South Wales came with the development of Mount Blue Cow in the 1980s. In 1987 the Skitube alpine railway opened to deliver skiers from Bullocks Flat, on the Alpine Way, to Perisher Valley and to Blue Cow, which also opened in 1987. The operators of Blue Cow purchased Guthega in 1991, and the new combined resort later merged with Perisher-Smiggins to become the largest ski resort in the Southern Hemisphere. In 2022 Perisher had 48 lifts covering 1,245 hectares (3,080 acres) and four village base areas: Perisher Valley, Blue Cow, Smiggin Holes and Guthega.

Blue Cow has eight ski lifts:

- Ridge Quad Chair
- Summit Quad Chair
- Early Starter Double Chair
- Terminal Quad Chair
- Brumby T-Bar
- Pony Ride Carpet
- Snowsports School Rope Tow (Snowsports School only)
- Pleasant Valley Quad Chair
