= Perisher Valley =

Human settlement in New South Wales, Australia

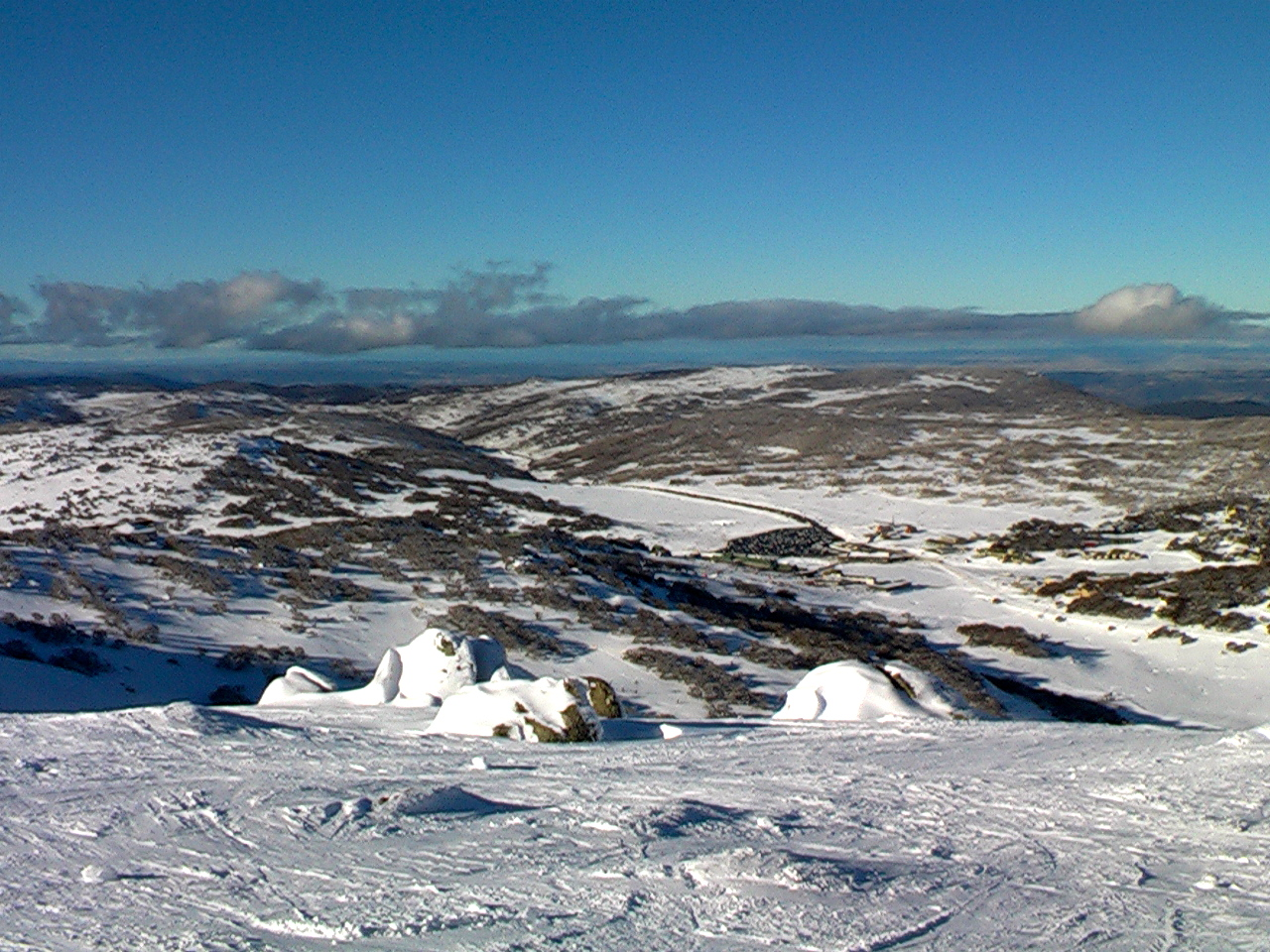
- Perisher Valley from Mount Perisher.

- Location within New South Wales
- Floor elevation: 1,720 m (5,640 ft)

Geography
- Location: Snowy Mountains, New South Wales, Australia
- Coordinates: 36°24′S 148°25′E
- Interactive map of Perisher Valley

Perisher Valley, commonly called Perisher, is a valley formed below Mount Perisher, a mountain that is located in the Snowy Mountains of New South Wales, Australia.

Located in the Snowy Monaro Regional Council, the valley is the site of one of four resort bases of the Perisher Ski Resort, which also comprises Guthega, Blue Cow and Smiggin Holes. It is located within the Kosciuszko National Park between Jindabyne and Charlotte Pass on the Kosciuszko Road. Access to the valley is via the Skitube Alpine Railway or by road. Although it is primarily a winter only resort village, year round accommodations are available, including tours, and bush walks.

At the 2021 census, Perisher Valley had a population of 99 people. In winter, the population is approximately 2,500 due to guests.

== Climate ==
Perisher has either a subarctic climate (Köppen climate classification: Dfc) or a subpolar oceanic climate (Köppen climate classification: Cfc), depending on whether the 0 °C (32 °F) or −3 °C (27 °F) isotherm is used, with cool summers and cold winters, although the higher peaks have a tundra climate (ET).

As expected of a ski resort there is a snowpack lasting for several months of the year, sometimes into early summer, however not as long-lasting as equivalent elevations over the western side of the range due to its sheltered location. Snow can be expected to fall on 60.2 days of the year on average.

Climate data for Perisher Valley Ski Centre (1991–2010, extremes 1976–2010); 1,735 m (5,692 ft) AMSL; 36.40° S, 148.41° E
| Month | Jan | Feb | Mar | Apr | May | Jun | Jul | Aug | Sep | Oct | Nov | Dec | Year |
|---|---|---|---|---|---|---|---|---|---|---|---|---|---|
| Record high °C (°F) | 28.2 (82.8) | 29.8 (85.6) | 25.4 (77.7) | 22.0 (71.6) | 18.0 (64.4) | 14.0 (57.2) | 10.5 (50.9) | 13.5 (56.3) | 16.0 (60.8) | 21.0 (69.8) | 25.5 (77.9) | 25.2 (77.4) | 29.8 (85.6) |
| Mean daily maximum °C (°F) | 19.7 (67.5) | 18.7 (65.7) | 16.1 (61.0) | 12.1 (53.8) | 8.3 (46.9) | 4.2 (39.6) | 2.8 (37.0) | 3.6 (38.5) | 6.1 (43.0) | 10.0 (50.0) | 14.3 (57.7) | 16.1 (61.0) | 11.0 (51.8) |
| Daily mean °C (°F) | 12.8 (55.0) | 12.0 (53.6) | 9.5 (49.1) | 5.9 (42.6) | 3.2 (37.8) | 0.5 (32.9) | −1.0 (30.2) | −0.4 (31.3) | 2.1 (35.8) | 5.1 (41.2) | 8.0 (46.4) | 9.8 (49.6) | 5.6 (42.1) |
| Mean daily minimum °C (°F) | 5.9 (42.6) | 5.2 (41.4) | 2.8 (37.0) | −0.4 (31.3) | −1.9 (28.6) | −3.3 (26.1) | −4.7 (23.5) | −4.4 (24.1) | −1.9 (28.6) | 0.1 (32.2) | 1.6 (34.9) | 3.4 (38.1) | 0.2 (32.4) |
| Record low °C (°F) | −5.0 (23.0) | −7.0 (19.4) | −7.0 (19.4) | −10.8 (12.6) | −9.8 (14.4) | −18.0 (−0.4) | −17.0 (1.4) | −15.0 (5.0) | −12.5 (9.5) | −11.6 (11.1) | −8.5 (16.7) | −5.9 (21.4) | −18.0 (−0.4) |
| Average precipitation mm (inches) | 113.9 (4.48) | 88.0 (3.46) | 92.0 (3.62) | 71.0 (2.80) | 104.4 (4.11) | 174.1 (6.85) | 155.6 (6.13) | 243.6 (9.59) | 244.2 (9.61) | 161.2 (6.35) | 152.8 (6.02) | 87.5 (3.44) | 1,689.5 (66.52) |
| Average precipitation days (≥ 0.2 mm) | 8.0 | 8.3 | 8.8 | 8.8 | 10.1 | 12.4 | 12.2 | 12.7 | 13.7 | 12.8 | 11.2 | 6.4 | 125.4 |
| Average afternoon relative humidity (%) | 61 | 65 | 62 | 65 | 73 | 85 | 88 | 84 | 79 | 68 | 61 | 56 | 71 |
Source: Bureau of Meteorology

=== Snow depth ===
Snow depth measurements are taken by Snowy Hydro at Spencers Creek, approximately 2 kilometres (1 mi) west of Perisher Valley.

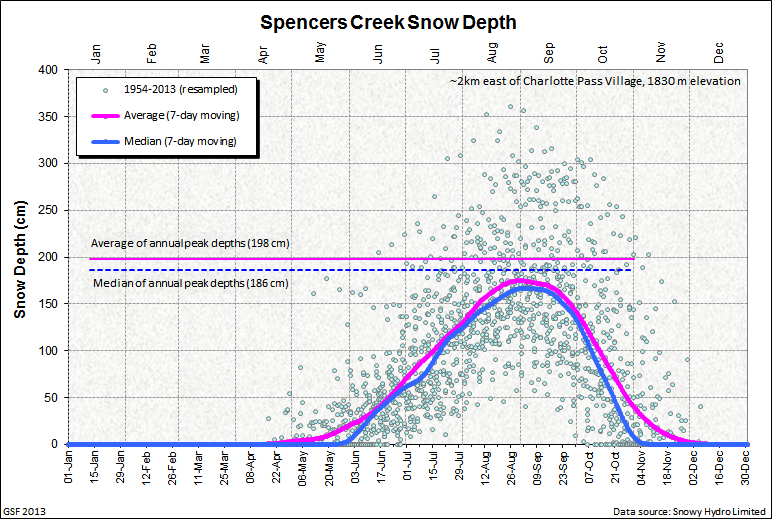
Average depth curve

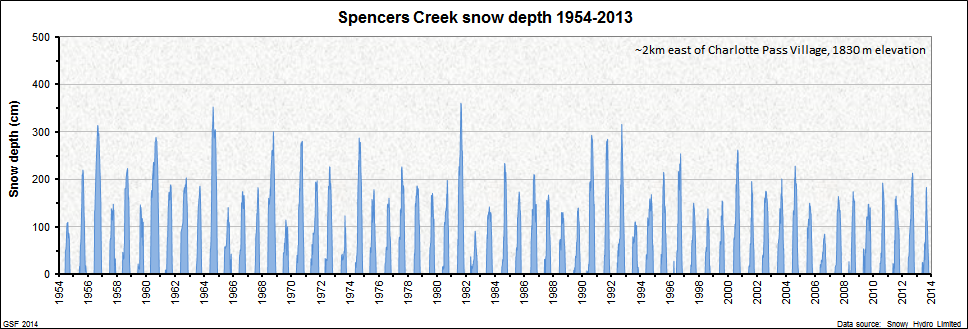
Full record

== History ==
The Snowy Mountains region is thought to have had Aboriginal occupation for some twenty thousand years. Large scale intertribal gatherings were held in the High Country during summer for collective feasting on the bogong moth.

This practice continued until around 1865. European explorers entered the district from 1835, and in 1840, Edmund Strzelecki ascended Mount Kosciuszko and named it after a Polish patriot. High country stockmen followed who used the Snowy Mountains for grazing during the summer months. Banjo Paterson's famous poem The Man From Snowy River recalls this era. The cattle graziers have left a legacy of mountain huts scattered across the area. A story, which may be apocryphal, credits James Spencer, who settled in the area in the 1840s with saying 'What a perisher' when caught in a storm, giving origin to the Perisher area.

The Kosciuszko National Park in which Perisher is situated came into existence as the National Chase Snowy Mountains on 5 December 1906. In 1944 this became the Kosciuszko State Park, and then the Kosciuszko National Park in 1967.

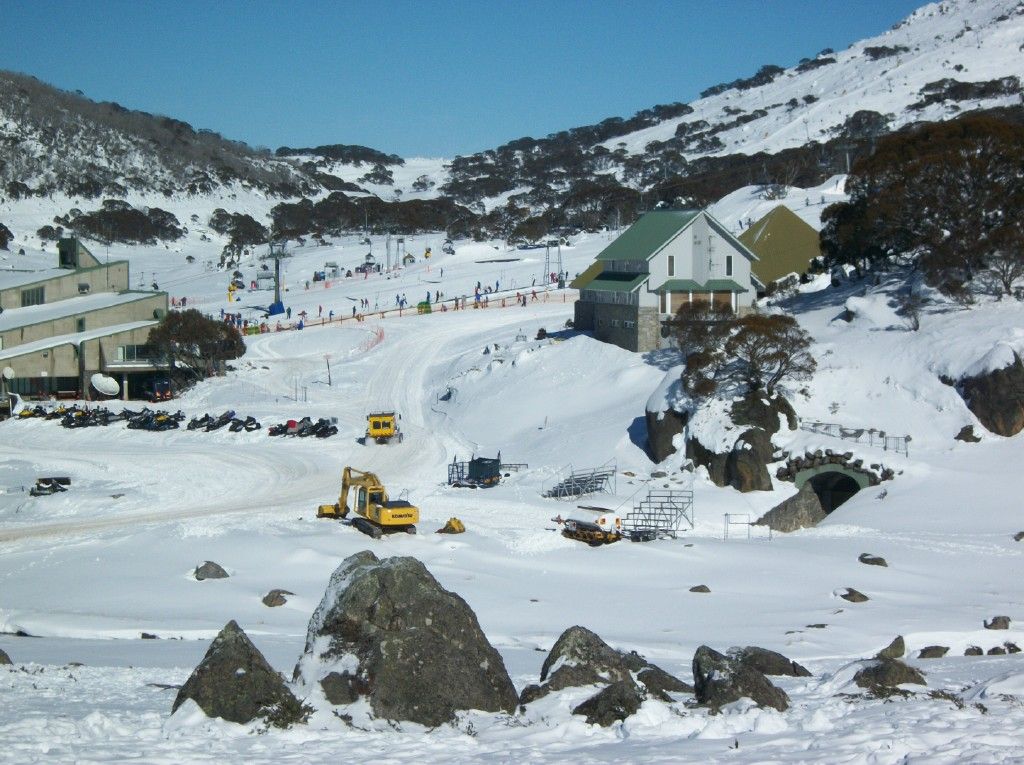
Perisher snow fields

The development of Skiing in Australia began at Kiandra in the Northern Snowy Mountains around 1861, but in the 20th century, the focus of Skiing in New South Wales shifted towards the Mount Kosciuszko region. The first Kosciuszko Chalet was built at Charlotte Pass in 1930, giving relatively comfortable access to Australia's highest terrain. The growing number of ski enthusiasts heading to Charlotte Pass led to the establishment of a cafe at Smiggin Holes, near Perisher Valley, around 1939, where horse-drawn sleighs would deliver skiers to be begin the arduous ski to the Kosciusko Chalet. It was the construction of the vast Snowy Mountains Hydro-Electric Scheme from 1949 that really opened up the Snowy Mountains for large scale development of a ski industry and led to the establishment of Thredbo and Perisher as leading Australian resorts. The Construction of Guthega Dam brought skiers to the isolated Guthega district and a rope tow was installed there in 1957.

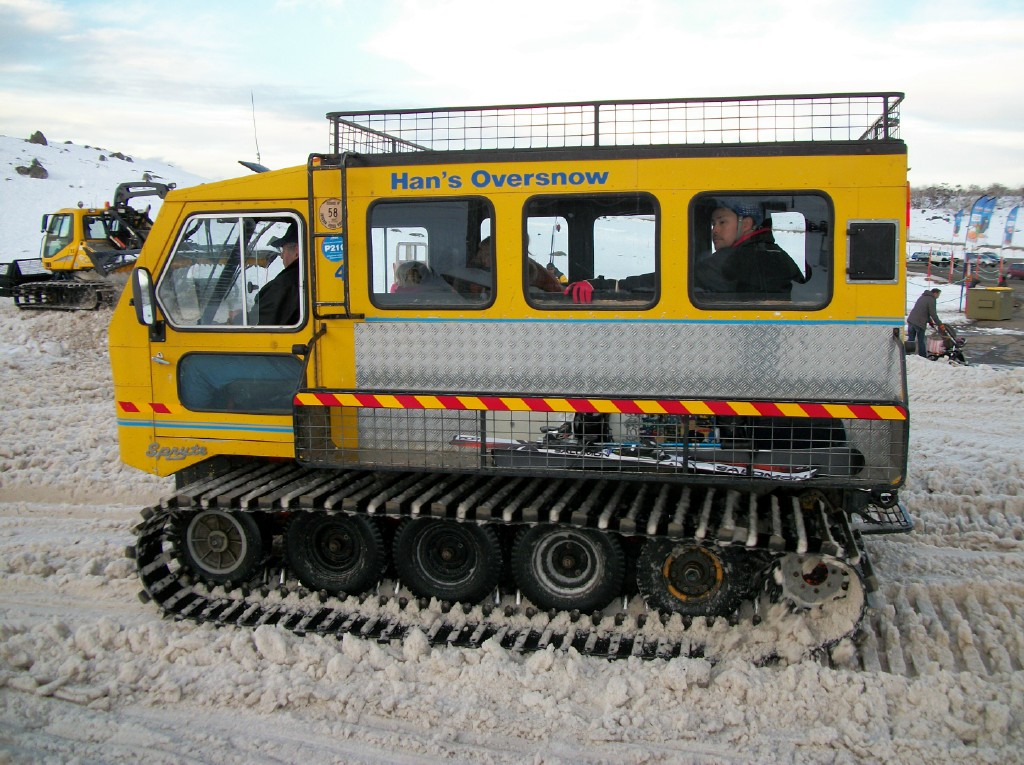
Oversnow transport in Perisher village

As the number of skiers increased, services, facilities and means of access were improved, and Perisher's first lodges were constructed. Telemark and the Snow Revellers Club being completed in 1952. In the winter of 1953 the first oversnow transport operated to Perisher Valley. It was greeted by the inhabitants with cheers and celebrations. In 1958, Svere Kaaten, another pioneer of the mountains, built a sophisticated rope tow at North Perisher. Ken Murray, an old friend of Svere's built another rope tow and Perisher's first T-bar. Development continued and Mount Perisher Double Chair was opened in 1962. After the opening of the first chairlift, T-bar expansion and rope tows, the Perisher area thrived. Murray Publishers Pty Limited was taken over by Australian Consolidated Press in 1972 and Kosciuszko Alpine Resorts was formed. Murray Publishers then traded under the name of Perisher Ski Resort which incorporated the resorts of Perisher and Smiggins. In 1995, Murray Publishers Pty Limited and the Alpine Australia Group Pty Limited merged to form Perisher Blue Pty Limited.

The last establishment of a major skifield in NSW came with the development of Mount Blue Cow in the 1980s. In 1987 the Swiss designed Skitube Alpine Railway opened to deliver skiers from Bullocks Flat, on the Alpine Way, to Perisher Valley and to Blue Cow, which also opened in 1987. The operators of Blue Cow purchased Guthega in 1991, and the new combined resort later merged with Perisher-Smiggins to become the largest ski resort in the Southern Hemisphere. In 2009 Perisher had 48 lifts covering 1,245 hectares and four village base areas: Perisher Valley, Blue Cow, Smiggin Holes and Guthega.

== Snowy Mountains of Music ==
Since 2009, Perisher Valley has been the host of the Snowy Mountains of Music Festival, a folk festival created by the same people behind the Illawarra Folk Festival. The festival runs every year on the Queen's Birthday Weekend, which is also the official start of the Ski Season for the Snowy Mountains. It acts as both a promotional festival for the Australian Snow Season, specifically, Perisher Valley, but also as an outlet for all sorts of Australian and International talent across a diverse range of genres.

== Resort statistics ==
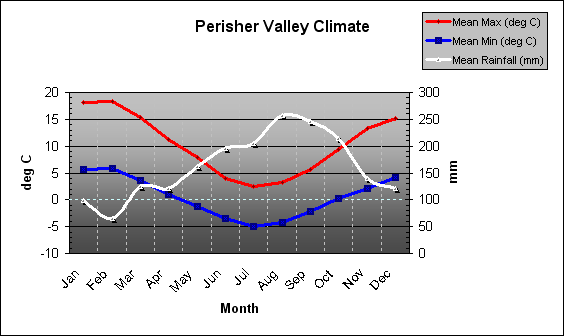
Perisher Valley Climate

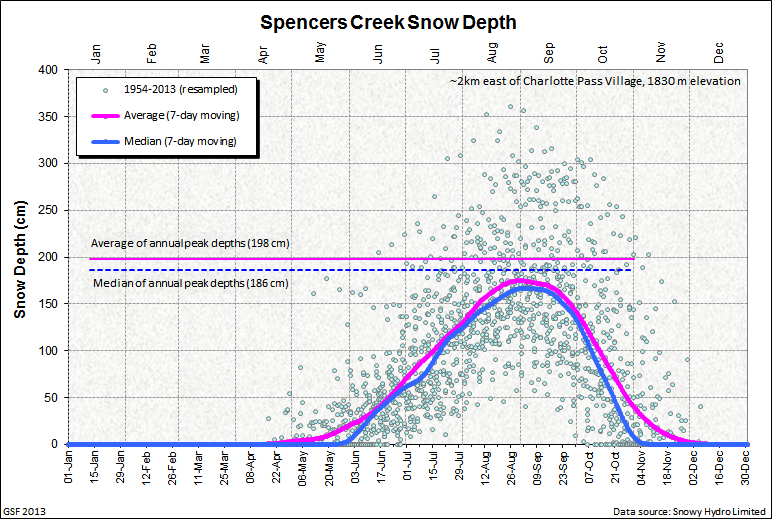
Average snow depth chart from Spencers Creek, near Perisher. Compiled by Snowy Hydro.

Perisher Valley is situated at 1,720 metres (5,640 ft) above sea level. The summit of Mount Perisher above the village reaches 2,054 metres (6,739 ft) of altitude. The highest lifted point is the Mt Perisher Six chairlift at 2,042m. According to statistics posted on the Perisher website in 2012, the recognised natural snow line in the region is at 1,650 metres (5,410 ft) and over the previous 15 years, the average maximum snow depth throughout the Resort had been about 1.9 metres (6.2 ft). Average minimum temperature during winter was stated as −3.7 °C (25.3 °F).

As of 2025, the four resort bases of the Perisher Ski Resort contain a skiable area of 1,245 hectares (3,076 acres) and are serviced by 45 lifts, making Perisher the largest Australian ski resort.

== Gallery ==
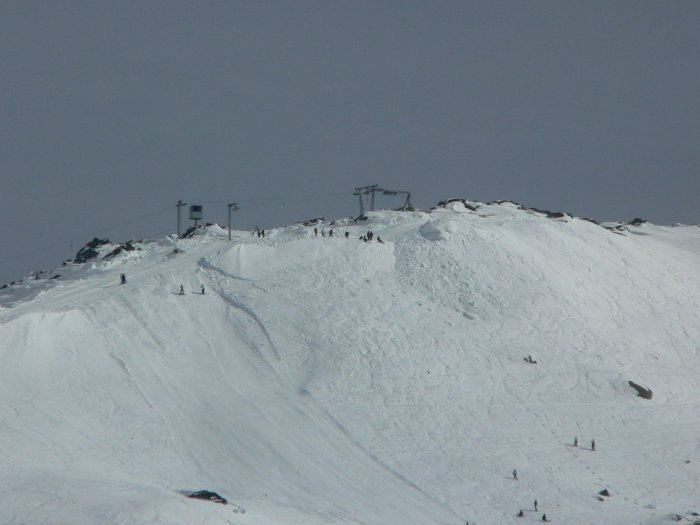
Olympic Ski Trail, leading to Perisher Valley from Back Perisher Mountain

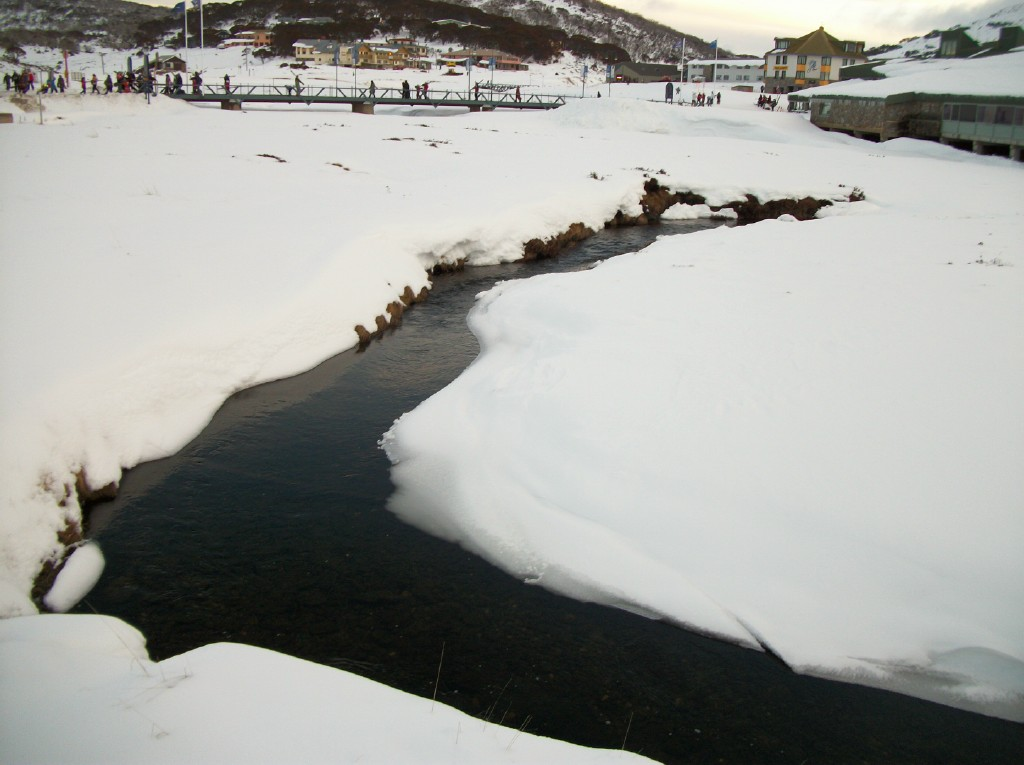
A creek in Perisher

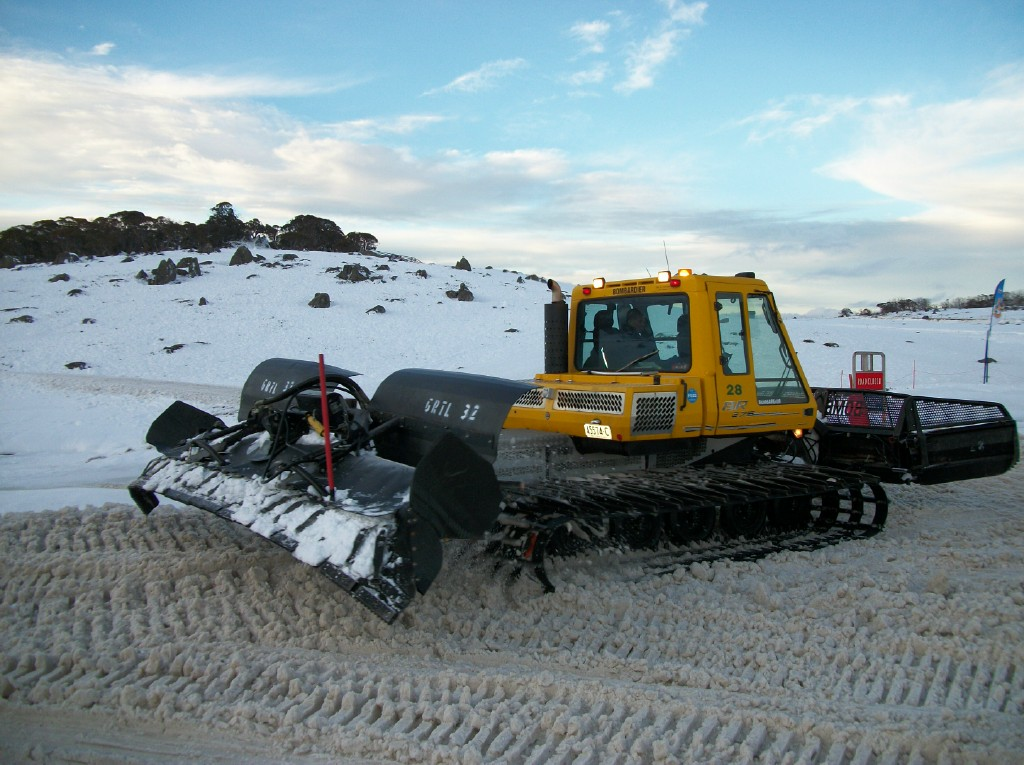
A snow grooming machine in Perisher

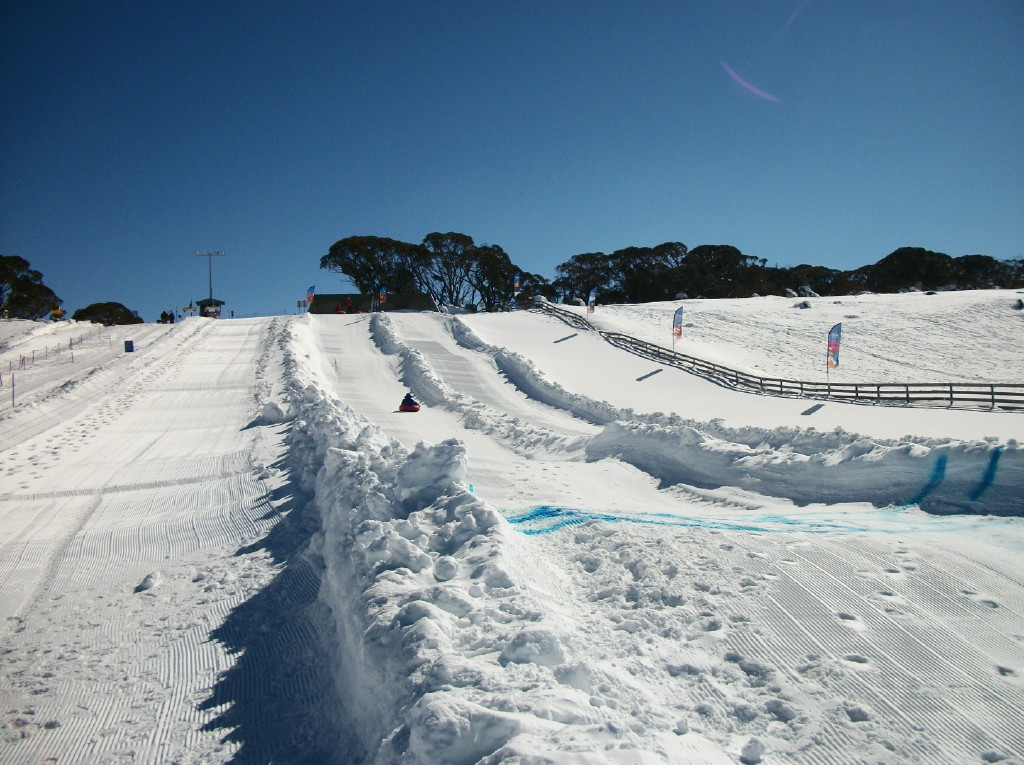
Toboggan field at Perisher

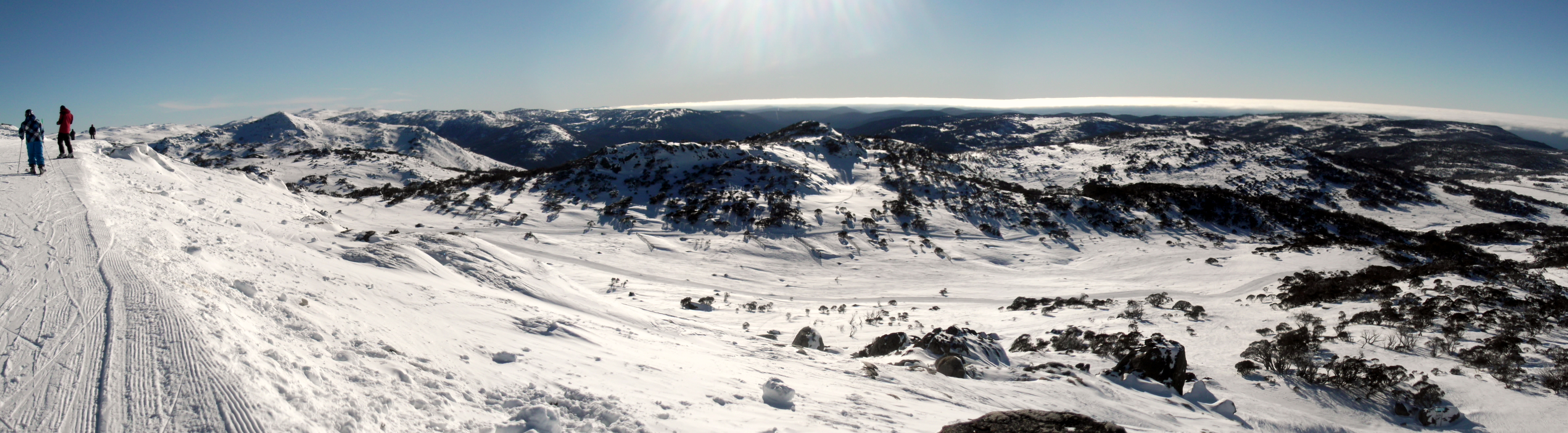
Looking towards Blue Cow from Perisher

== See also ==
- List of mountains of Australia § New South Wales
- Skiing in Australia
- List of extreme temperatures in Australia
