= Perisher Ski Resort =

Ski resort in New South Wales, Australia

Perisher
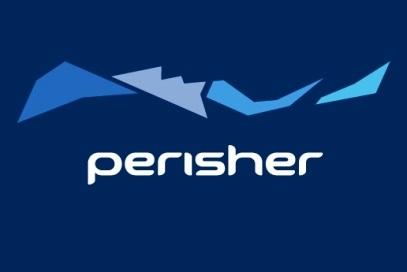

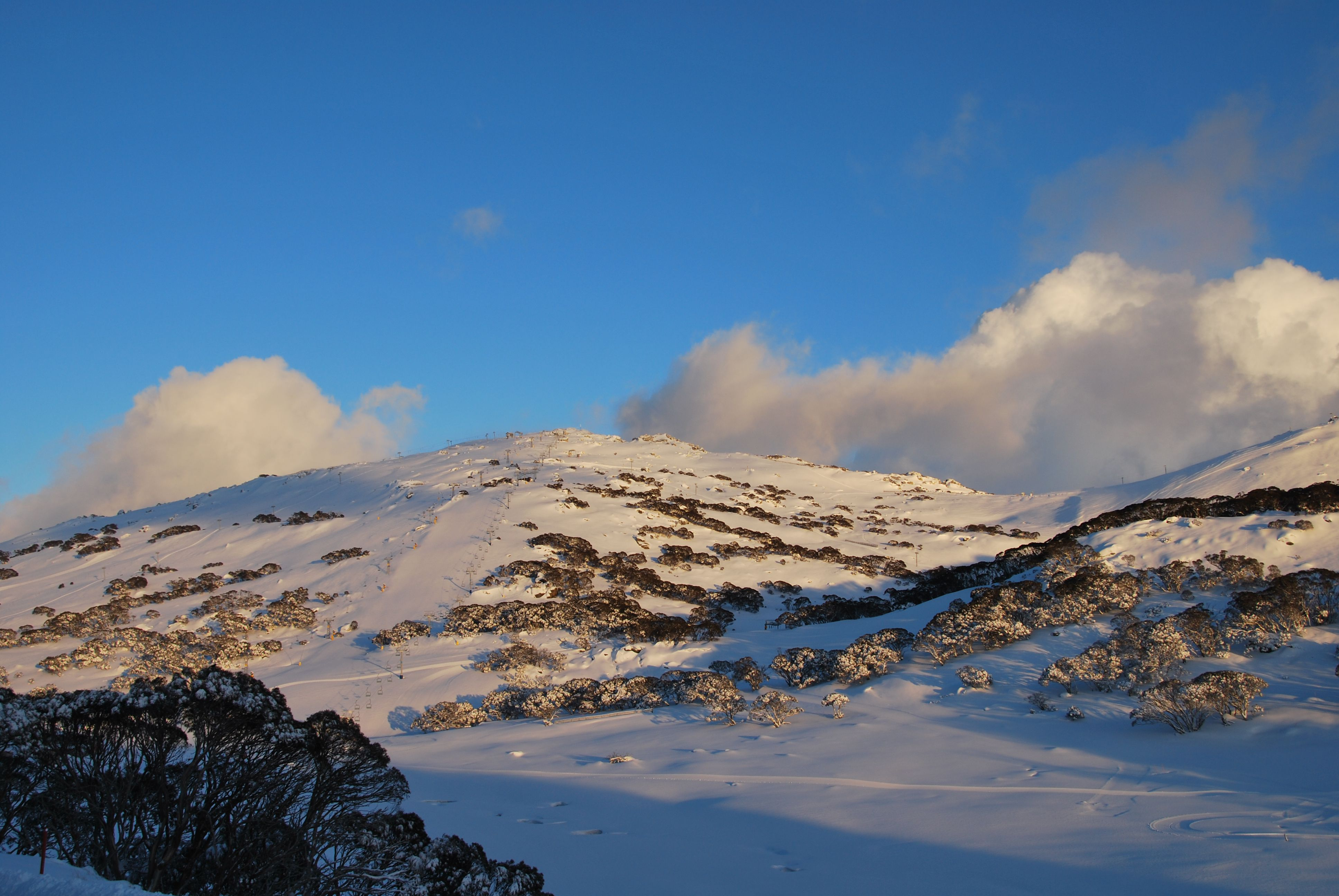
- Mount Perisher at 2,054 m (6,739 ft)
- Interactive map of Perisher
- Location: Perisher Valley
- Nearest city: Canberra
- Coordinates: 36.4°S 148.41°E
- Top elevation: 2,054 metres (6,739 ft)
- Base elevation: 1,720 metres (5,640 ft)
- Skiable area: 1,245 hectares (3,080 acres)
- Trails: 22% Beginner; 60% Intermediate; 18% Advanced
- Longest run: ~4 kilometres (2.5 mi) (Top of Perisher Quad Express to Bottom of Blue Calf T-Bar)
- Lift system: 45 lifts
- Snowfall: 190 centimetres (75 in) (median)
- Website: Perisher

Perisher Ski Resort (known as Perisher Blue until 2009) is the largest ski resort in the Southern Hemisphere. Located in the Australian Snowy Mountains, the resort is an amalgamation of four villages (Perisher Valley, Smiggin Holes, Guthega, and Blue Cow) and their associated ski fields, covering approximately 12 square kilometres (5 sq mi), with the base elevation at 1,720 metres (5,640 ft) AHD, and the summit elevation of 2,054 metres (6,739 ft) at the top of Mount Perisher. 4.4 square kilometres (1.7 sq mi) of this area is covered by 240 snow guns, which are used to artificially supplement the natural snowfall. Perisher was acquired by Vail Resorts, United States on 30 March 2015 for a sum of approximately AU$177 million.

The resort is accessible by road from Jindabyne and the Skitube, Australia's only underground rack railway from Bullocks Flat or Blue Cow. The main skiing period is in July and August, with the official season running from the second weekend in June to the first weekend of October. Perisher consists of 45 lifts: The Village Eight Express, an eight-seater chairlift (built in 2003), one high-speed six-seater chairlift, two high-speed quad detachable chairlifts, five fixed-grip quad chairlifts, two double chairlifts, one triple chairlifts, eighteen T-Bars, two J-bars, seven ski carpets, and two rope tows. The run difficulty distribution is 22% beginner, 60% intermediate and 18% advanced.

== History ==
The Snowy Mountains region is thought to have had Aboriginal occupation for some twenty thousand years. Large gatherings were held in the High Country during summer for collective feasting on the bogong moth. The area was first explored by Europeans in 1835, and in 1840, Edmund Strzelecki ascended Mount Kosciuszko and named it after a Polish patriot. High country stockmen followed who used the Snowy Mountains for grazing during the summer months. Banjo Paterson's famous poem The Man From Snowy River recalls this era. The cattle graziers have left a legacy of mountain huts scattered across the area. The Kosciuszko National Park in which Perisher ski resort is situated, came into existence as the National Chase Snowy Mountains on 5 December 1906. In 1944 this became the Kosciuszko State Park, and then the Kosciuszko National Park in 1967.

The four resort bases of Perisher had their origins as separate ski resorts, which developed between 1939 and 1987. Smiggins had its origins as a service point for the journey to Charlotte Pass, while the development of Perisher and Guthega were spurred by construction of the Snowy Mountains Scheme and Blue Cow was the last resort development in the Snowy Mountains.

In 1995, Perisher, Smiggins and Alpine Australia Group (Blue Cow/Guthega) merged to form Perisher Blue, which merged all four resorts as they are today, now known as Perisher. In 2009 Perisher had 47 lifts covering 1,245 hectares and four village base areas: Perisher Valley, Blue Cow, Smiggin Holes and Guthega.

=== Perisher Valley ===
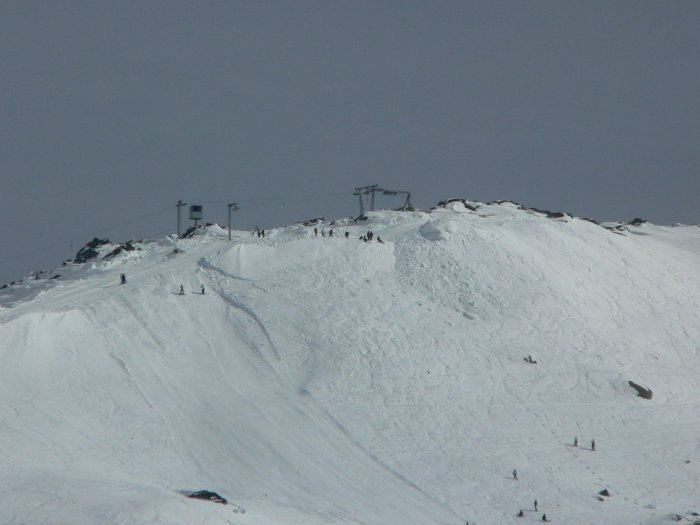
Olympic Ski Trail, leading to Perisher Valley from Perisher Mountain.

A story, which may be apocryphal, credits James Spencer, who settled in the area in the 1840s with saying 'What a perisher' when caught in a storm. The area was used by mountain graziers during the summer months for many years.

It was the construction of the vast Snowy Mountains Hydro-Electric Scheme from 1949 that really opened up the Snowy Mountains for large scale development of a ski industry and led to the establishment of Perisher as a leading Australian resort. The first ski lodges opened in 1951 and by 1957, a number of ski clubs operating.

As the number of skiers increased, services, facilities and means of access were improved, and Perisher's first lodges were constructed. Telemark and the Snow Revellers Club being completed in 1952. In the winter of 1953 the first oversnow transport operated to Perisher Valley. It was greeted by the inhabitants with cheers and celebrations.

In 1958, Svere Kaaten, another pioneer of the mountains, built a sophisticated rope tow at North Perisher. Ken Murray, an old friend of Svere's built another rope tow and Perisher's first T-bar. Development continued and Mount Perisher Double Chair was opened in 1961. After the opening of the first chairlift, T-bar expansion and rope tows, the Perisher area thrived. Murray Publishers Pty Limited was taken over by Australian Consolidated Press in 1972 and Kosciuszko Alpine Resorts was formed.

Murray Publishers then traded under the name of Perisher Ski Resort which incorporated the resorts of Perisher and Smiggins. In 1995, Murray Publishers Pty Limited and the Alpine Australia Group Pty Limited merged to form Perisher Blue Pty Limited.

By 2008, Perisher Valley had 30 interconnecting ski lifts, over 100 ski instructors, extensive snow making facilities, and a large ski-resort village providing winter accommodation.

Perisher Valley is the main village of the Perisher Ski resort and features the majority of on-snow accommodation. The largest hotels in Perisher are The Marritz Hotel, The Perisher Manor, The Man from Snowy River, The Perisher Manor and The Eiger Chalet.

Perisher Valley ski lifts	Lift type
Eyre	T-Bar
International	T-Bar
Mt. Perisher Six	Chairlift
Sun Valley	T-Bar
Olympic	T-Bar
Happy Valley	T-Bar
Leichhardt	Chairlift
Home Rope Tow	Rope tow
Lawson	T-Bar
Blaxland	T-Bar
Wentworth	T-Bar
Quad Express	Chairlift
Pretty Valley Double	Chairlift
Telemark	T-Bar
North Perisher	T-Bar
Interceptor Quad	Chairlift
Sturt	T-Bar
Village 8 Express	Chairlift
Mitchell	T-Bar
Tom Thumb	Magic carpet
Ski Carpet 2	Magic carpet
Ski Carpet 3	Magic carpet
Ski Carpet 4	Magic carpet
Ski Carpet 5	Magic carpet

=== Smiggin Holes ===
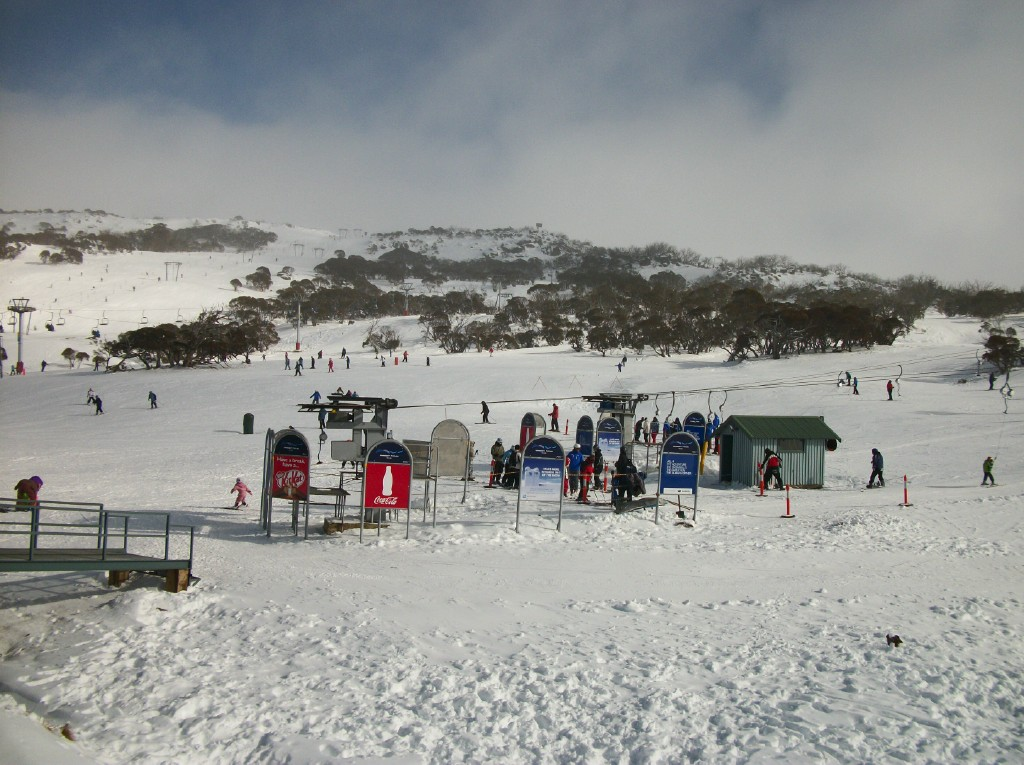
Smiggin Holes

The high Snowy Mountains were long used by graziers for summer pasturelands. The name "Smiggin Holes" is said to be of Scottish origin and a reference to the effects of trampling cattle causing depressions that filled with water.

The first Kosciuszko Chalet was built at Charlotte Pass in 1930, giving relatively comfortable access to Australia's highest terrain. The growing number of ski enthusiasts heading to Charlotte Pass led to the establishment of a cafe at Smiggin Holes around 1939, where horse-drawn sleighs would deliver skiers to be begin the arduous ski to the Kosciusko Chalet.

The Kosciuszko National Park came into existence as the National Chase Snowy Mountains on 5 December 1906. In 1944 this became the Kosciuszko State Park, and then the Kosciuszko National Park in 1967. The name was misspelt as Kosciusko until 1997. The existence of the Park ensured the decline of the summer grazing industry, but the Snowy Mountains Hydro-Electric Scheme development of 1949-1974 ensured the opening up and development of Skiing in New South Wales, including the steeper and higher terrain around Mount Perisher, near Smiggins.

Today, Smiggins operates within the greater Perisher Ski Resort and provides accommodation and ideal terrain for beginner skiers.

Smiggin Holes ski lifts	Lift type
Piper	T-Bar
Link	T-Bar
Burke	T-Bar
Wills	T-Bar
Kaaten Triple	Chairlift
Hume	T-Bar
Captain Cook	J-Bar
Scott	J-Bar
Zoe's	Magic carpet
Harry & Herman's	Magic carpet

=== Blue Cow ===
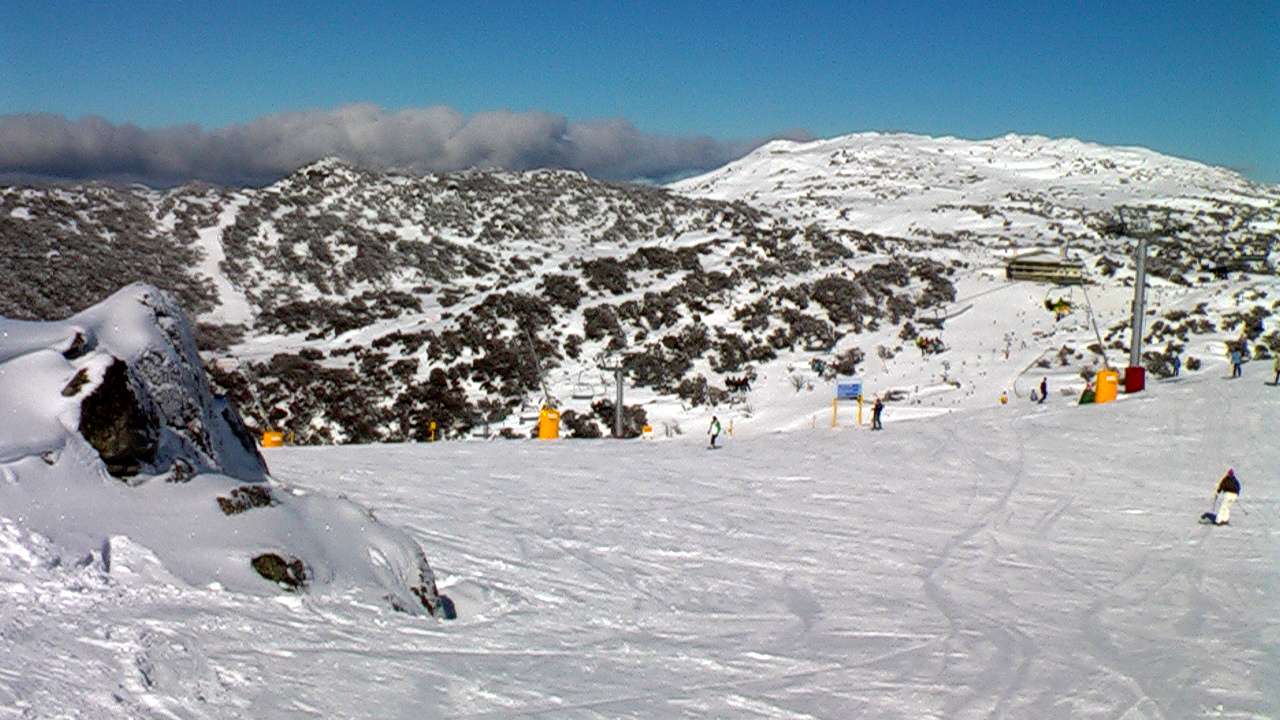
Blue Cow Mountain opened in 1987 as the last great development in the New South Wales skifields.

Some time after 1840 James Spencer, a grazier, obtained the lease for all the high country on the main range, including Kosciuszko and Blue Cow peaks. His homestead was situated at West Point (now known as Waste Point) near the entrance to Kosciuszko National Park. Apparently Spencer crossed some imported black English Shorthorn cattle with white Shorthorns, obtaining offspring with blue roan coats. Blue Cow Mountain was named after one of these cross-bred cows, which would disappear after the thaw each year and would invariably be found on the mountain before the next winter.

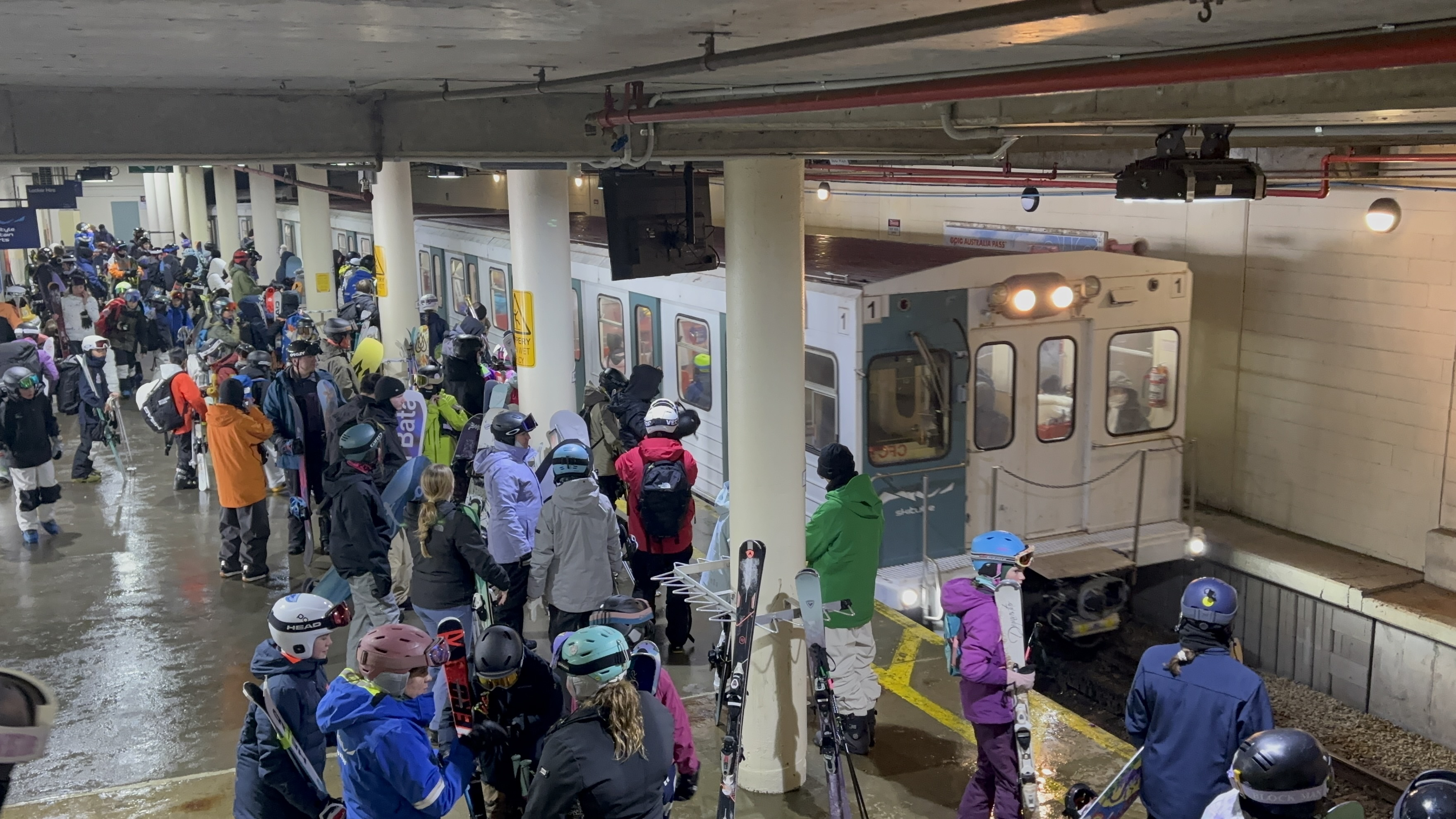
Skitube arriving at Blue Cow

In the 1970s, the NSW National Parks & Wildlife Service carried out studies for the development of skiing at Mount Blue Cow, in response to the identified need for the expansion of suitable areas and facilities to enable the continued growth of alpine skiing within the Park. In November 1984 the bid by Mount Blue Cow Ski Bowl Pty Ltd was selected, Fritz Feiersinger and Transfield, each owning 50%. Construction commenced in December 1985 with it officially opened by Premier of New South Wales Nick Greiner 29 August 1988.

The last establishment of a major skifield in New South Wales came with the development of Blue Cow Mountain in the 1980s. In 1987 the Swiss designed Skitube Alpine Railway opened to deliver skiers from Bullocks Flat, on the Alpine Way, to Perisher Valley and to Blue Cow, which also opened in 1987. The operators of Blue Cow purchased Guthega in 1991, and the new combined resort later merged with Perisher-Smiggins to become the largest ski resort in the Southern Hemisphere. The resort opened in July 1987 and despite transport difficulties (caused by the delay in the completion of the Skitube alpine railway beyond Perisher) the response to the facilities and the mountain was overwhelmingly positive.

Today Blue Cow includes the facilities of Blue Cow Resort Centre at 1905m and Guthega Ski Centre at 1640m. The highest lifted point on the Blue Cow Side of Perisher is 1960m reached by the Summit Quad Chairlift. The vertical drop to the base of the Ridge at 1605m is 360m. Blue Cow's 14 ski lifts open daily during winter from 8.30am to 5.00pm weather permitting. There is also snowmaking over an area serviced by six lifts.

Blue Cow ski lifts	Lift type
Ridge Quad	Chairlift
Summit Quad	Chairlift
Early Starter Double	Chairlift
Terminal Quad	Chairlift
Brumby	T-Bar
Pleasant Valley Quad	Chairlift
Pony Ride	Magic carpet
Snowsports School Rope Tow	Rope tow

=== Guthega ===
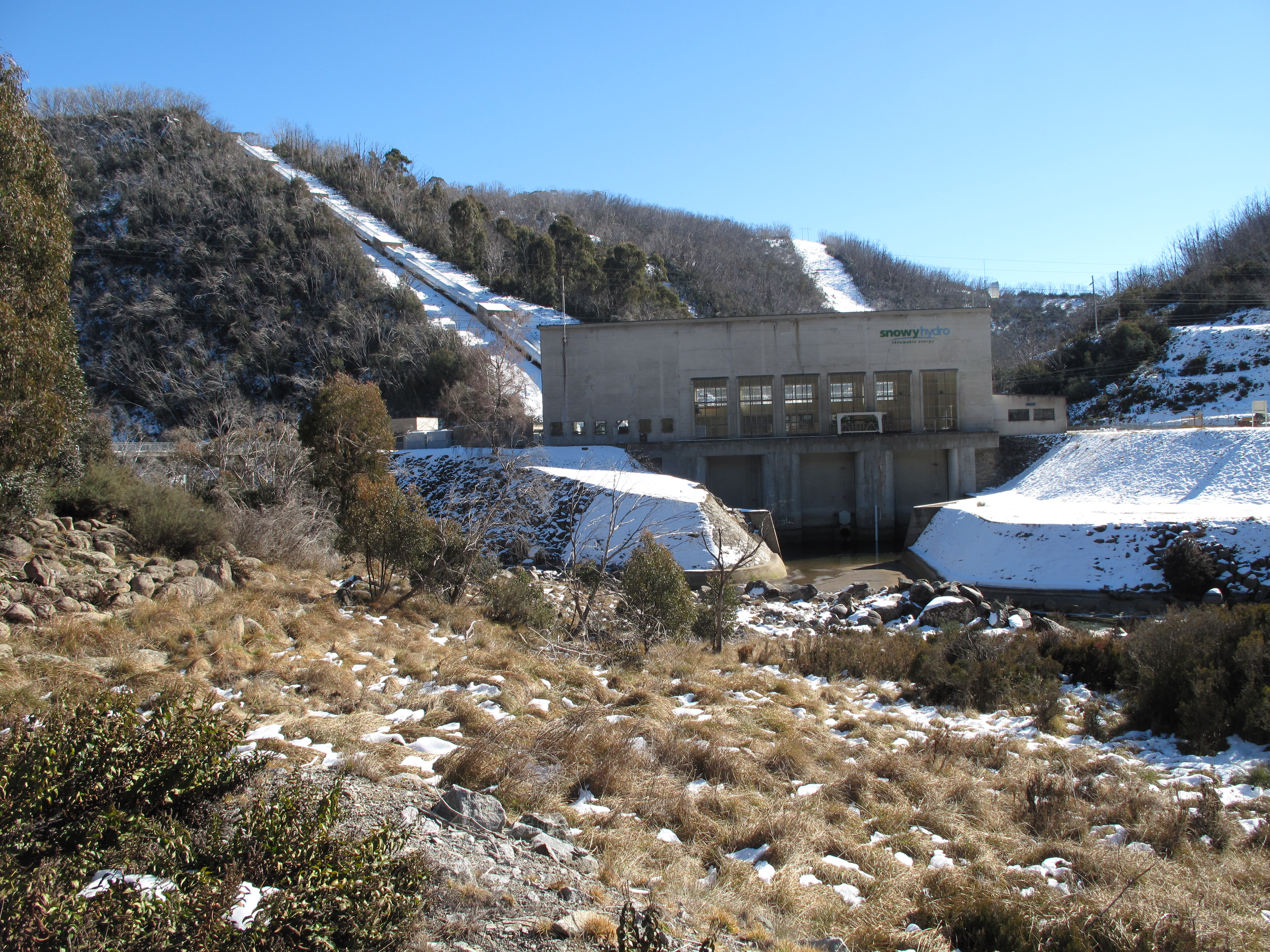
Guthega Power Station. Construction of the Snowy Mountains Hydro-Electric Scheme opened up access to the Snowy Mountains and brought an influx of European workers interested in developing Skiing in Australia.

Guthega Resort was established in the 1950s along with Perisher Valley and Smiggin Holes, when improved access to the mountains, created by the Snowy Mountains Hydro Electric Scheme, and the associated influx of European migrants with skiing experience, stimulated the growth of skiing in New South Wales. The Construction of Guthega Dam brought skiers to the isolated Guthega district and a rope tow was installed there in 1957.

Mainly because of its "out of the way" location, Guthega remained a separate small resort, operated by Guthega Development Pty Ltd, with only a handful of lodges, few lifts, and limited patronage from day skiers, who had to contend with more difficult road conditions than those to Smiggin Holes or Perisher Valley.

In 1982 the Car Park chairlift was installed, which overcame the need for visitors to walk some distance uphill to the upper end of the village to reach the bottom lift, thus making the resort more appealing to day visitors.

In 1991, Guthega was purchased by the Alpine Australia Group Pty Limited, the then operator of the Blue Cow Resort. This led to the operation of two resorts becoming integrated in 1992, thus providing day access into Guthega via the Skitube alpine railway and the Blue Cow and Link Management Unit ski slopes.

During the 2013-14 summer, the Freedom Quad Chair was constructed. It opened for the 2014 season, providing access to skiable terrain without the use of T-Bars or J-Bars. It replaced the former Cow Pastures J-Bar.

Guthega ski lifts	Lift type
Blue Cow	T-Bar
Blue Calf	T-Bar
Carpark Double	Chairlift
Freedom Quad	Chairlift

=== Skitube ===
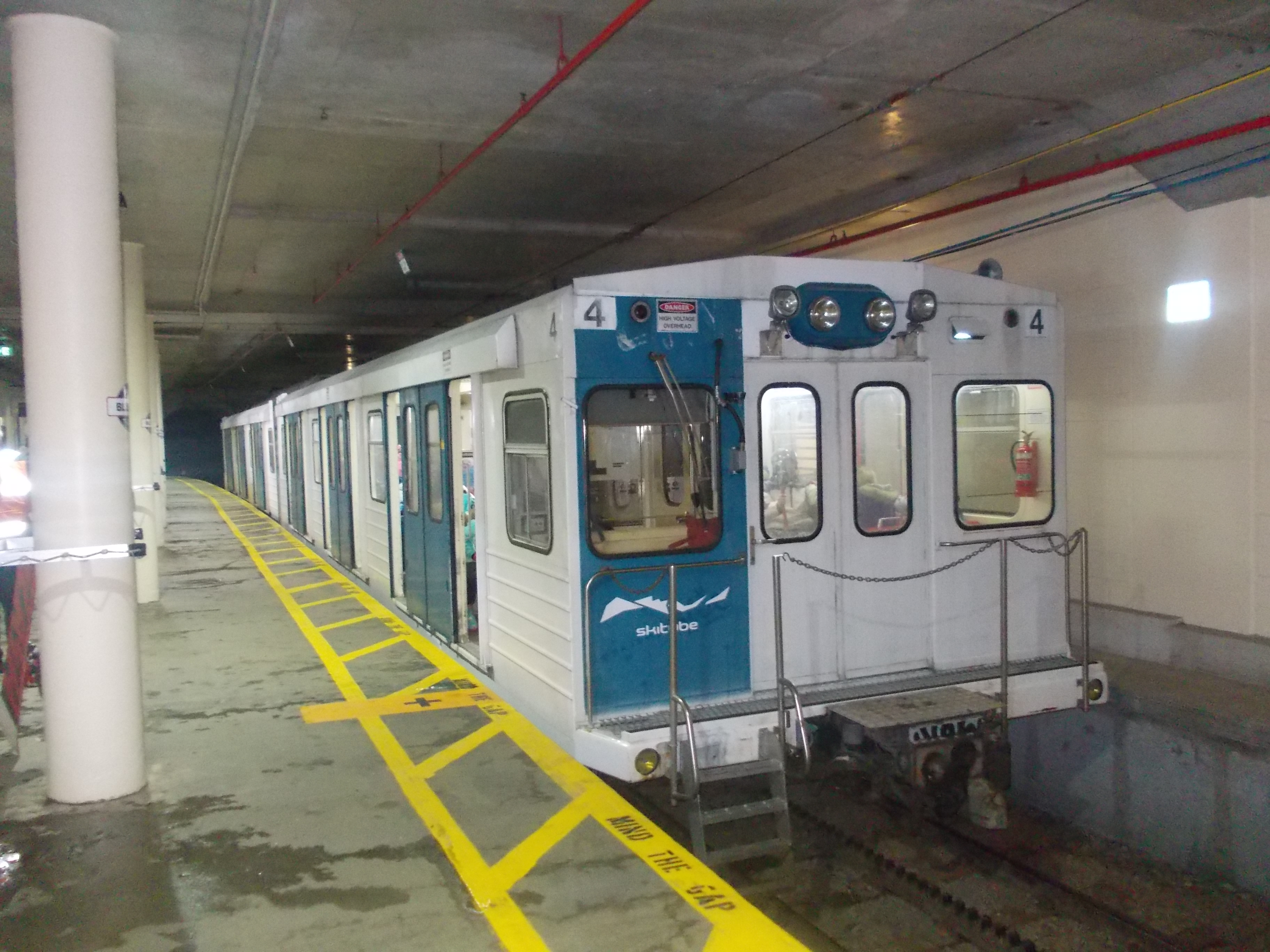
A Skitube train at Blue Cow terminus

Initially, Skitube alpine railway was designed as a winter based access system to improve entry to the Perisher Range ski fields. Until then, these areas were served by a single road of limited capacity that was and still often is, adversely affected by snow and ice during winter. The Skitube was deemed to be the most efficient and environmentally acceptable alternative available. When it was decided to go ahead with the development of Mount Blue Cow in 1984, Skitube was the most practical option for providing access to the resort, and so Skitube was extended from Perisher to Mount Blue Cow.

Skitube is a Swiss designed rack-rail train that takes passengers from Bullocks Flat on the Alpine Way through a tunnel in the Ramshead Range to the Perisher Resort, stopping in the underground station at Perisher Valley. Skitube then proceeds to Blue Cow Mountain via another tunnel through the Perisher Range. The tunnel is 6.3 kilometres (3.9 mi) long, and at its deepest point it is 550 metres (1,800 ft) below the surface.

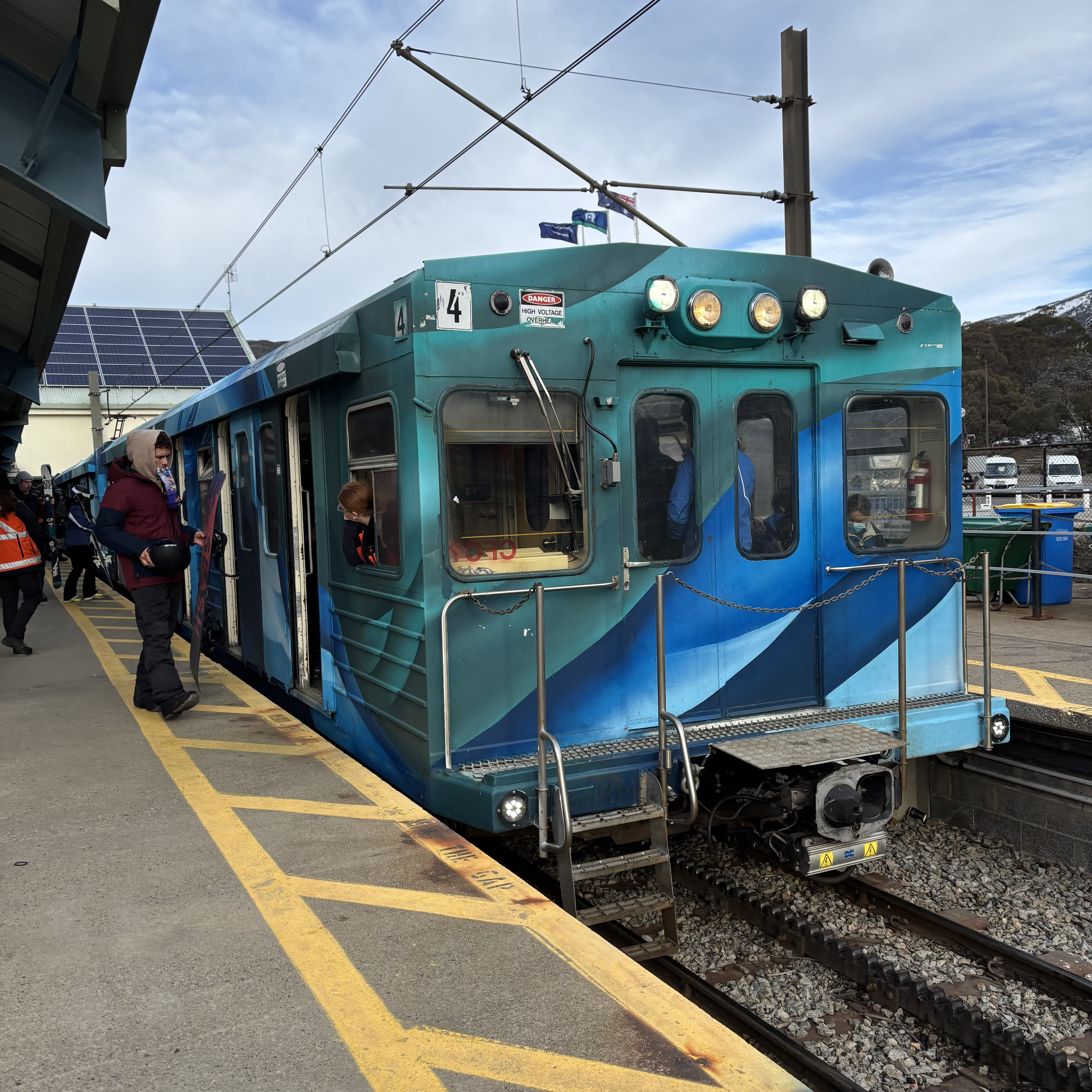
a Skitube at Bullocks Flat station

== Climate ==
Perisher has either a subarctic climate (Köppen climate classification: Dfc) or a subpolar oceanic climate (Köppen climate classification: Cfc), depending on whether the 0 °C (32 °F) or −3 °C (27 °F) isotherm is used, with cool summers and cold winters, although the higher peaks have a tundra climate (ET). As expected of a ski resort there is a snowpack lasting for several months of the year, sometimes into early summer, however not as long-lasting as equivalent elevations over the western side of the range due to its sheltered location. Snow can be expected to fall on 60.2 days of the year on average.

Climate data for Perisher Valley Ski Centre (1991–2010, extremes 1976–2010); 1,735 m (5,692 ft) AMSL; 36.40° S, 148.41° E
Month	Jan	Feb	Mar	Apr	May	Jun	Jul	Aug	Sep	Oct	Nov	Dec	Year
Record high °C (°F)	28.2 (82.8)	29.8 (85.6)	25.4 (77.7)	22.0 (71.6)	18.0 (64.4)	14.0 (57.2)	10.5 (50.9)	13.5 (56.3)	16.0 (60.8)	21.0 (69.8)	25.5 (77.9)	25.2 (77.4)	29.8 (85.6)
Mean daily maximum °C (°F)	19.7 (67.5)	18.7 (65.7)	16.1 (61.0)	12.1 (53.8)	8.3 (46.9)	4.2 (39.6)	2.8 (37.0)	3.6 (38.5)	6.1 (43.0)	10.0 (50.0)	14.3 (57.7)	16.1 (61.0)	11.0 (51.8)
Daily mean °C (°F)	12.8 (55.0)	12.0 (53.6)	9.5 (49.1)	5.9 (42.6)	3.2 (37.8)	0.5 (32.9)	−1.0 (30.2)	−0.4 (31.3)	2.1 (35.8)	5.1 (41.2)	8.0 (46.4)	9.8 (49.6)	5.6 (42.1)
Mean daily minimum °C (°F)	5.9 (42.6)	5.2 (41.4)	2.8 (37.0)	−0.4 (31.3)	−1.9 (28.6)	−3.3 (26.1)	−4.7 (23.5)	−4.4 (24.1)	−1.9 (28.6)	0.1 (32.2)	1.6 (34.9)	3.4 (38.1)	0.2 (32.4)
Record low °C (°F)	−5.0 (23.0)	−7.0 (19.4)	−7.0 (19.4)	−10.8 (12.6)	−9.8 (14.4)	−18.0 (−0.4)	−17.0 (1.4)	−15.0 (5.0)	−12.5 (9.5)	−11.6 (11.1)	−8.5 (16.7)	−5.9 (21.4)	−18.0 (−0.4)
Average precipitation mm (inches)	113.9 (4.48)	88.0 (3.46)	92.0 (3.62)	71.0 (2.80)	104.4 (4.11)	174.1 (6.85)	155.6 (6.13)	243.6 (9.59)	244.2 (9.61)	161.2 (6.35)	152.8 (6.02)	87.5 (3.44)	1,689.5 (66.52)
Average precipitation days (≥ 0.2 mm)	8.0	8.3	8.8	8.8	10.1	12.4	12.2	12.7	13.7	12.8	11.2	6.4	125.4
Average afternoon relative humidity (%)	61	65	62	65	73	85	88	84	79	68	61	56	71
Source: Bureau of Meteorology

=== Snow depth ===
Snow depth measurements are taken by Snowy Hydro at Spencers Creek, approximately 2 kilometres (1 mi) west of Perisher Valley.

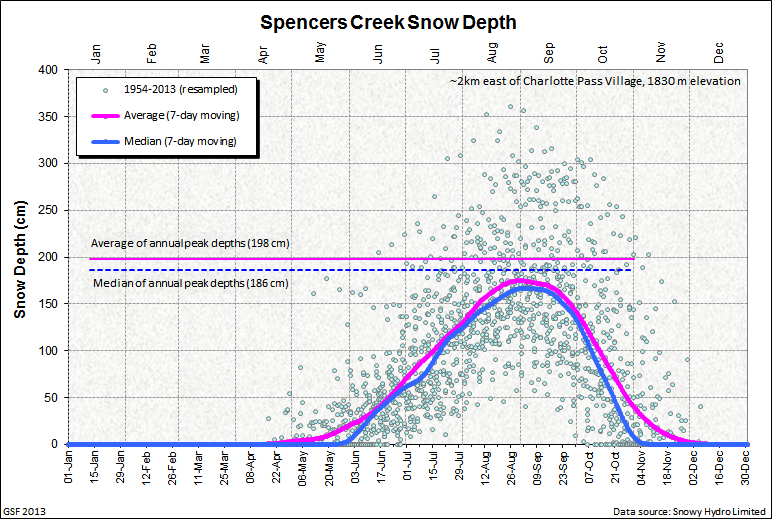
Average depth curve

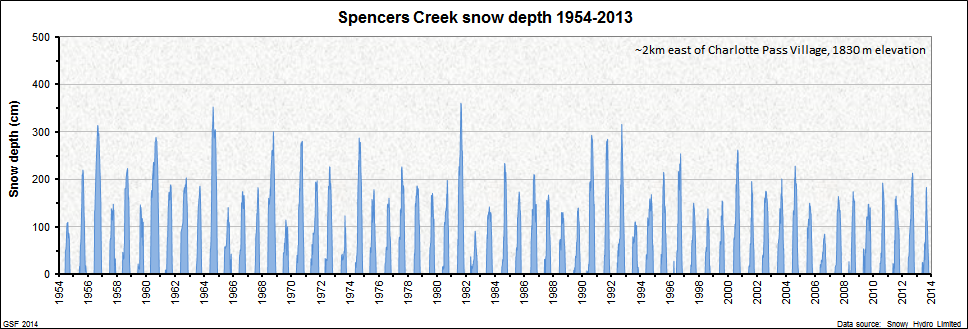
Full record

== Gallery ==
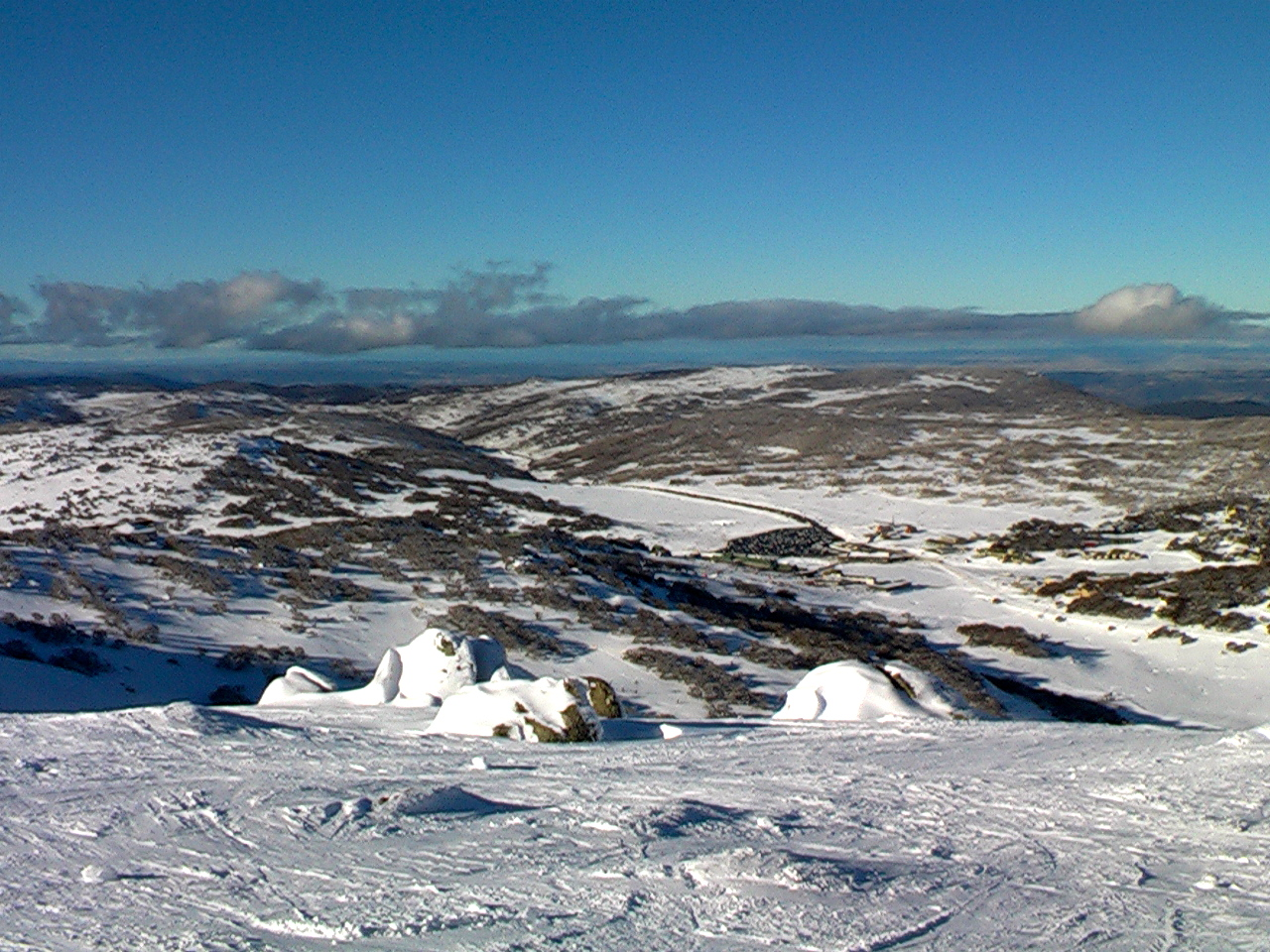
Perisher Valley from Mount Perisher

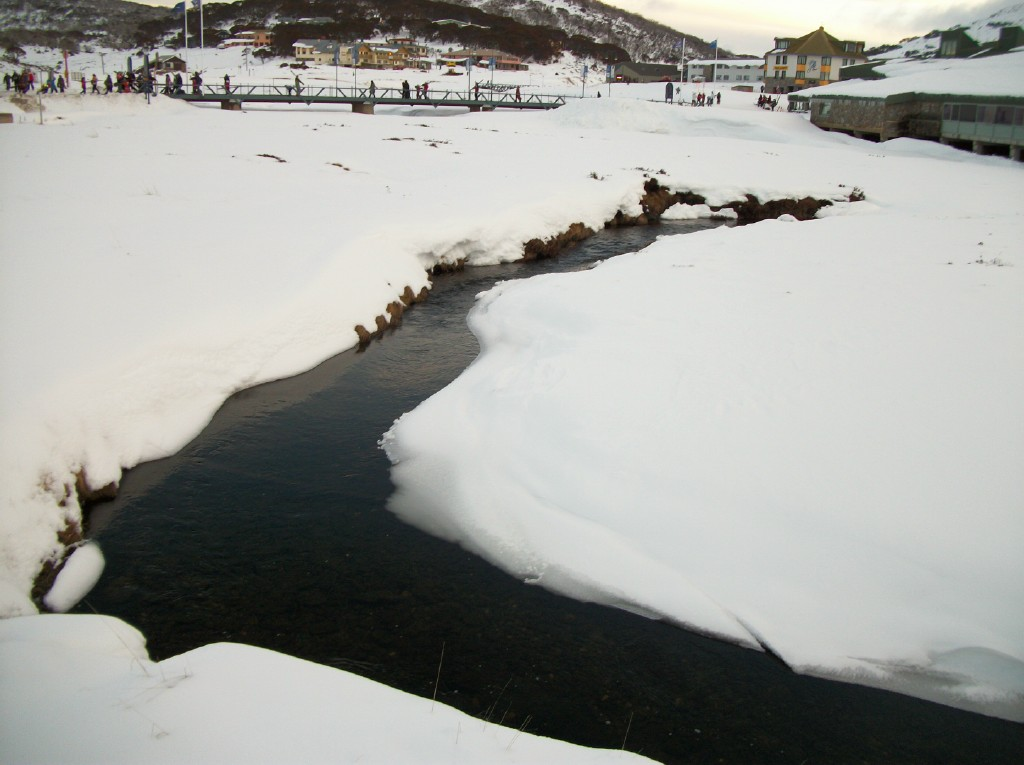
A creek in Perisher

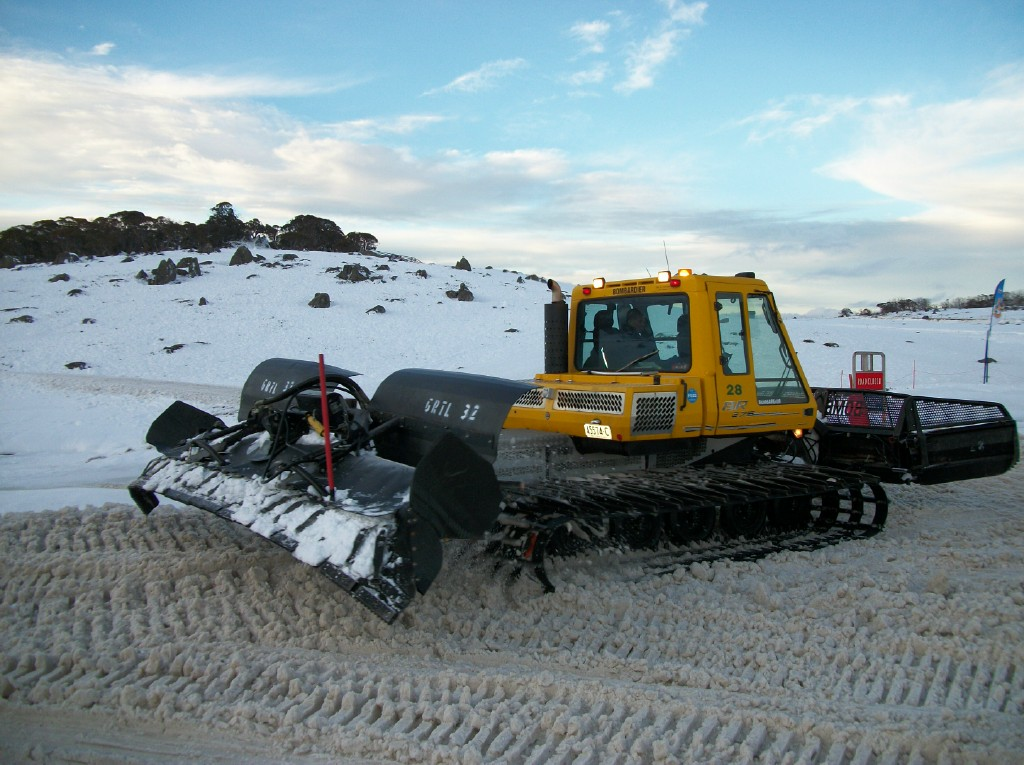
A snow grooming machine in Perisher

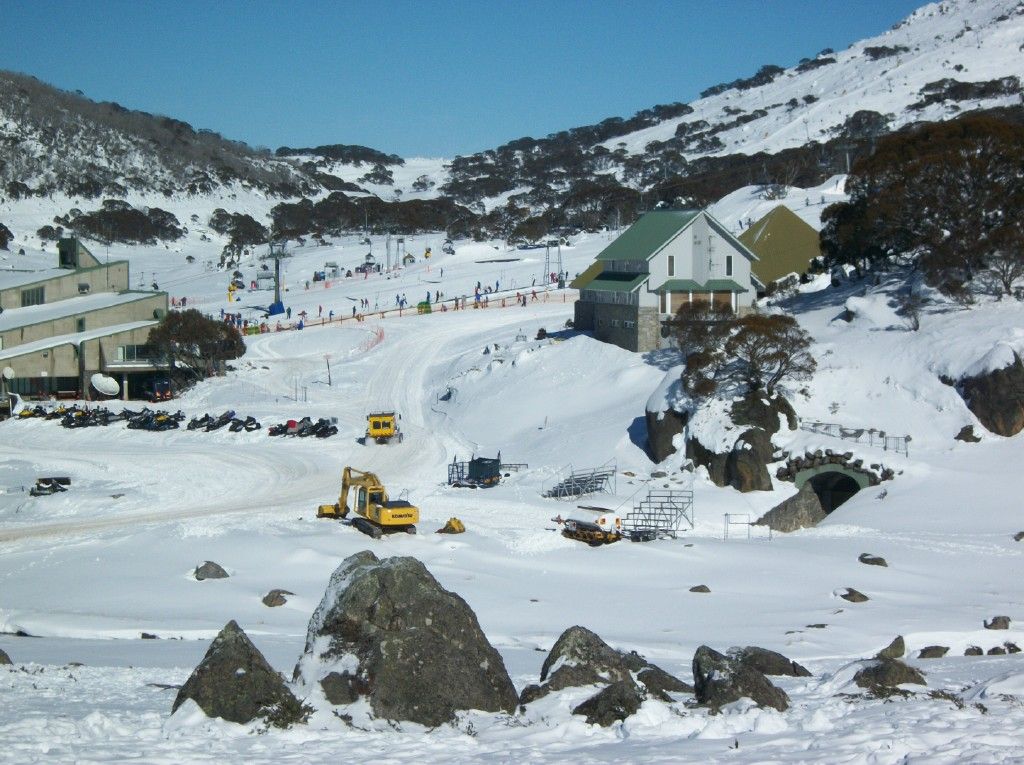
Perisher snow fields

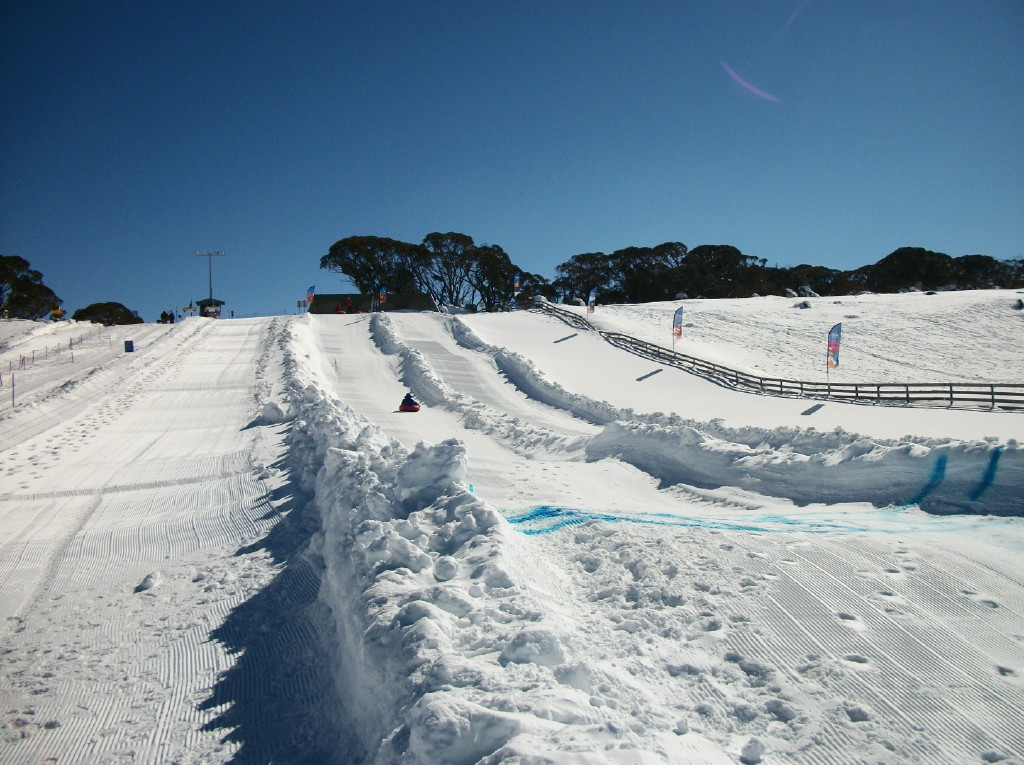
Toboggan field at Perisher

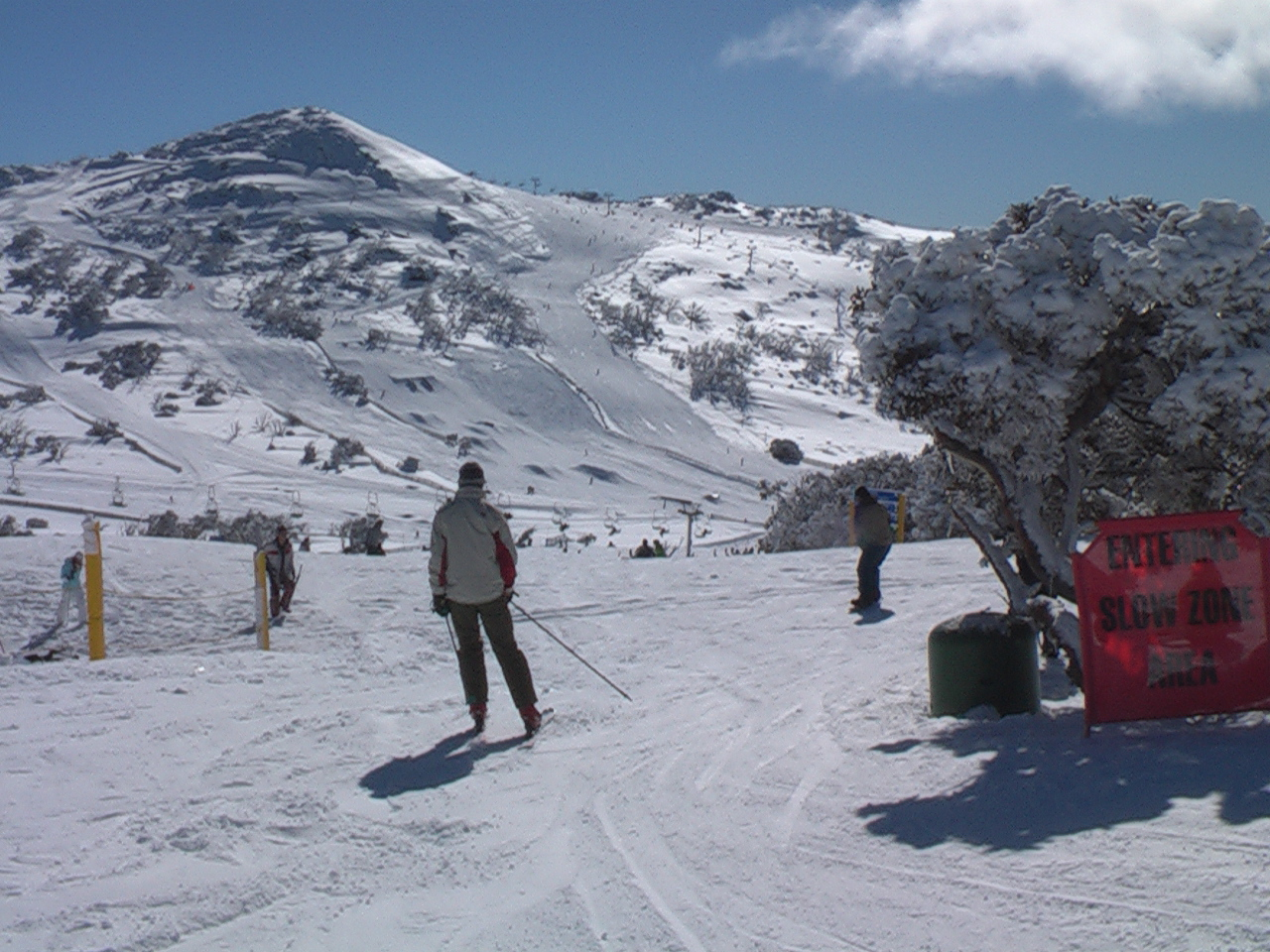
Blue Cow Mountain

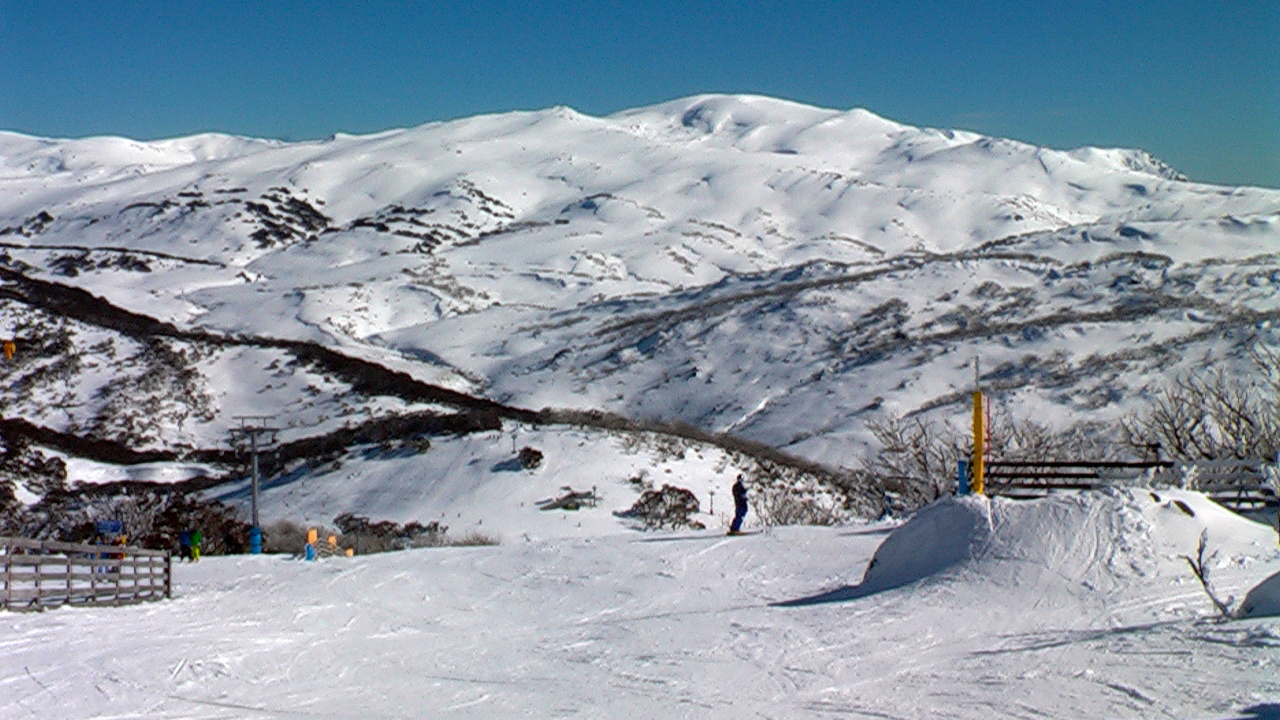
Guthega

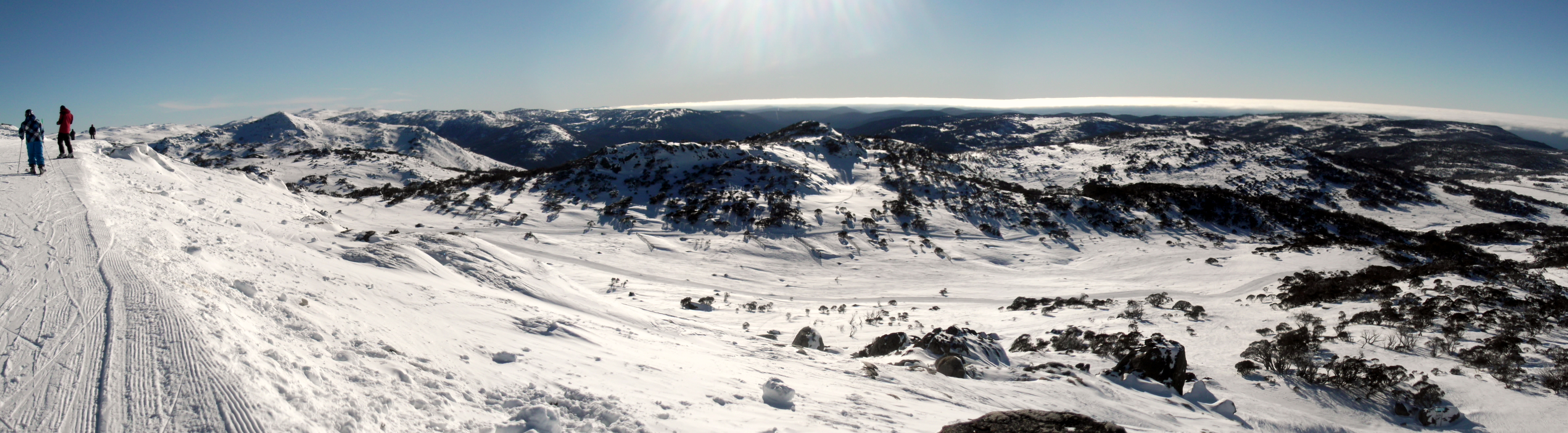
Looking towards Blue Cow from Perisher

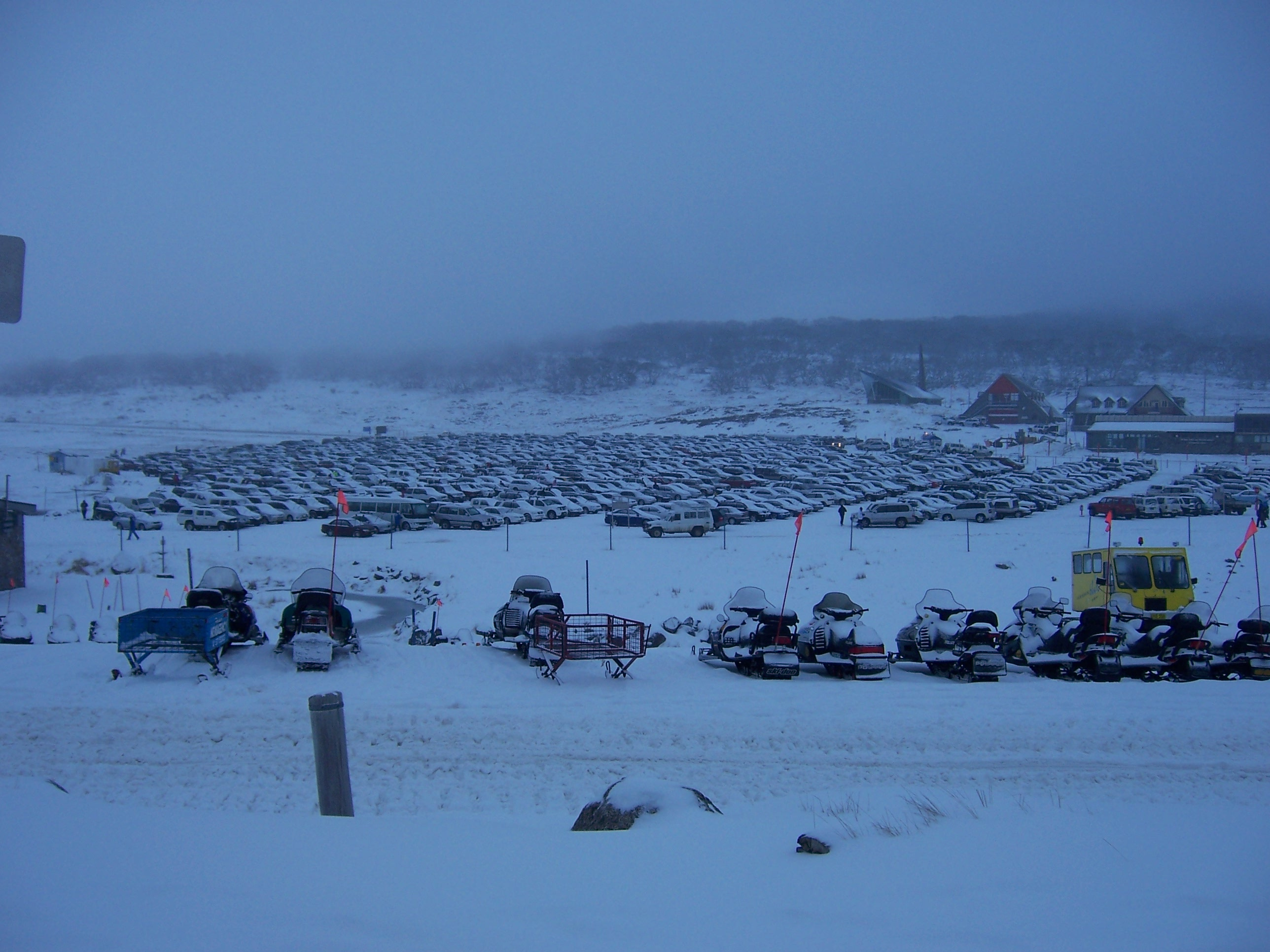
Main carpark at Perisher

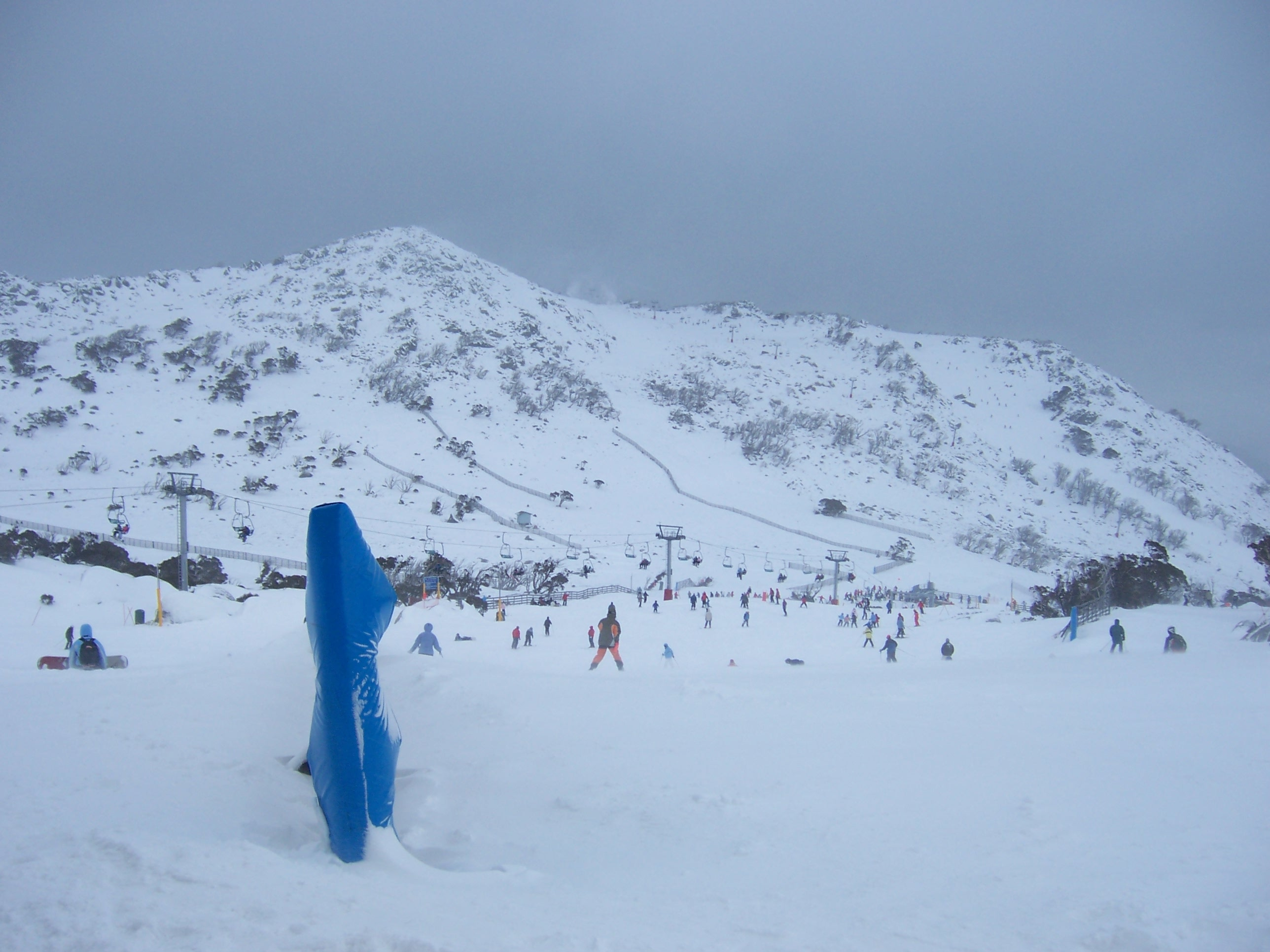
Blue Cow ski area

== See also ==
- Skiing in Australia
- Skiing in New South Wales
