= Skitube =

Electric rack railway in New South Wales, Australia

Coordinates: 36°22′S 148°24′E

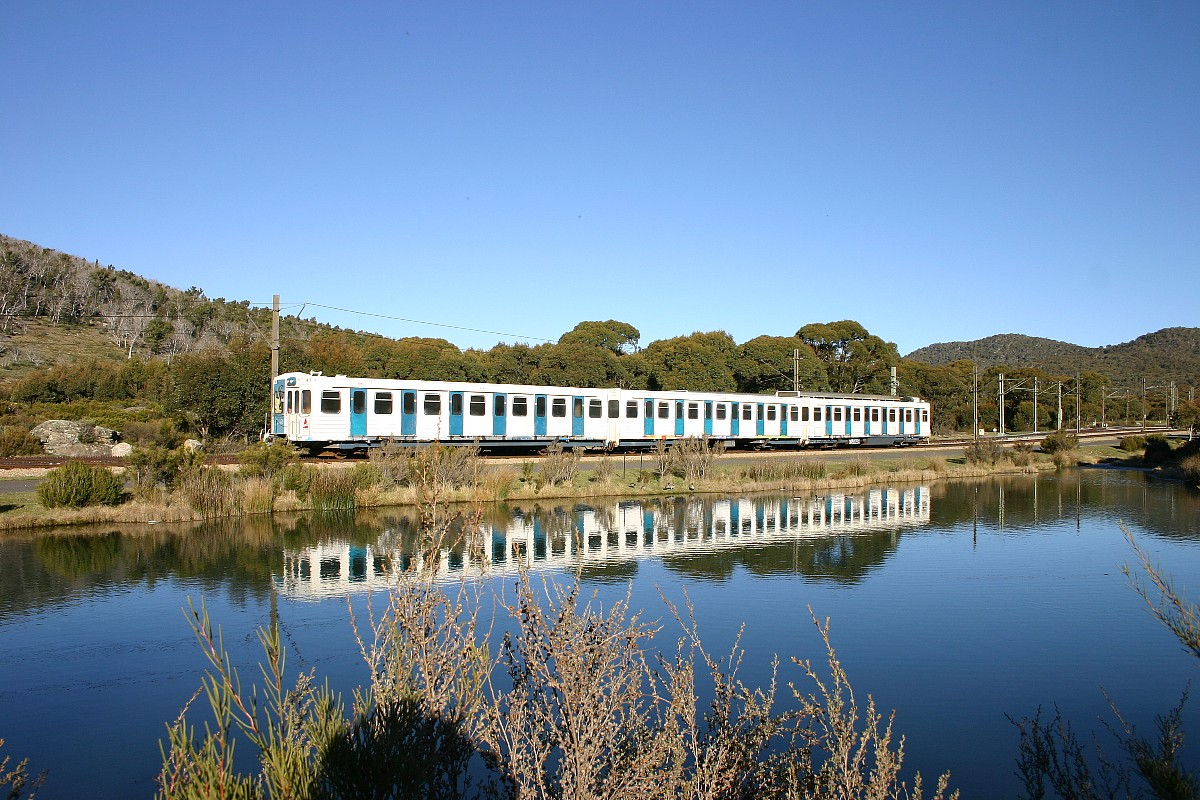
- A Skitube train commences its ascent just west of the Bullocks Flat terminus in October 2006

Overview
- Owner: Perisher Ski Resort
- Locale: Snowy Mountains
- Termini: Bullocks Flat; Blue Cow
- Stations: 3

Service
- Services: 3 per hour (peak season)
- Rolling stock: 11 × Comeng carriages

History
- Opened: 29 August 1988

Technical
- Line length: 8.5 kilometres (5.3 mi) (Map)
- Number of tracks: single track with passing loops
- Rack system: Lamella
- Track gauge: 1,435 mm (4 ft 8 1/2 in) standard gauge
- Electrification: 1,500 V DC overhead catenary
- Operating speed: Uphill: 40 km/h (25 mph); Downhill: 21 km/h (13 mph)
- Highest elevation: 1,905 m (6,250 ft) above sea level
- Maximum incline: 12.5%

Skitube is a standard gauge electric rack railway in the Kosciuszko National Park in New South Wales, Australia. It provides access to the snowfields at Blue Cow Mountain and Perisher Valley.

== History ==
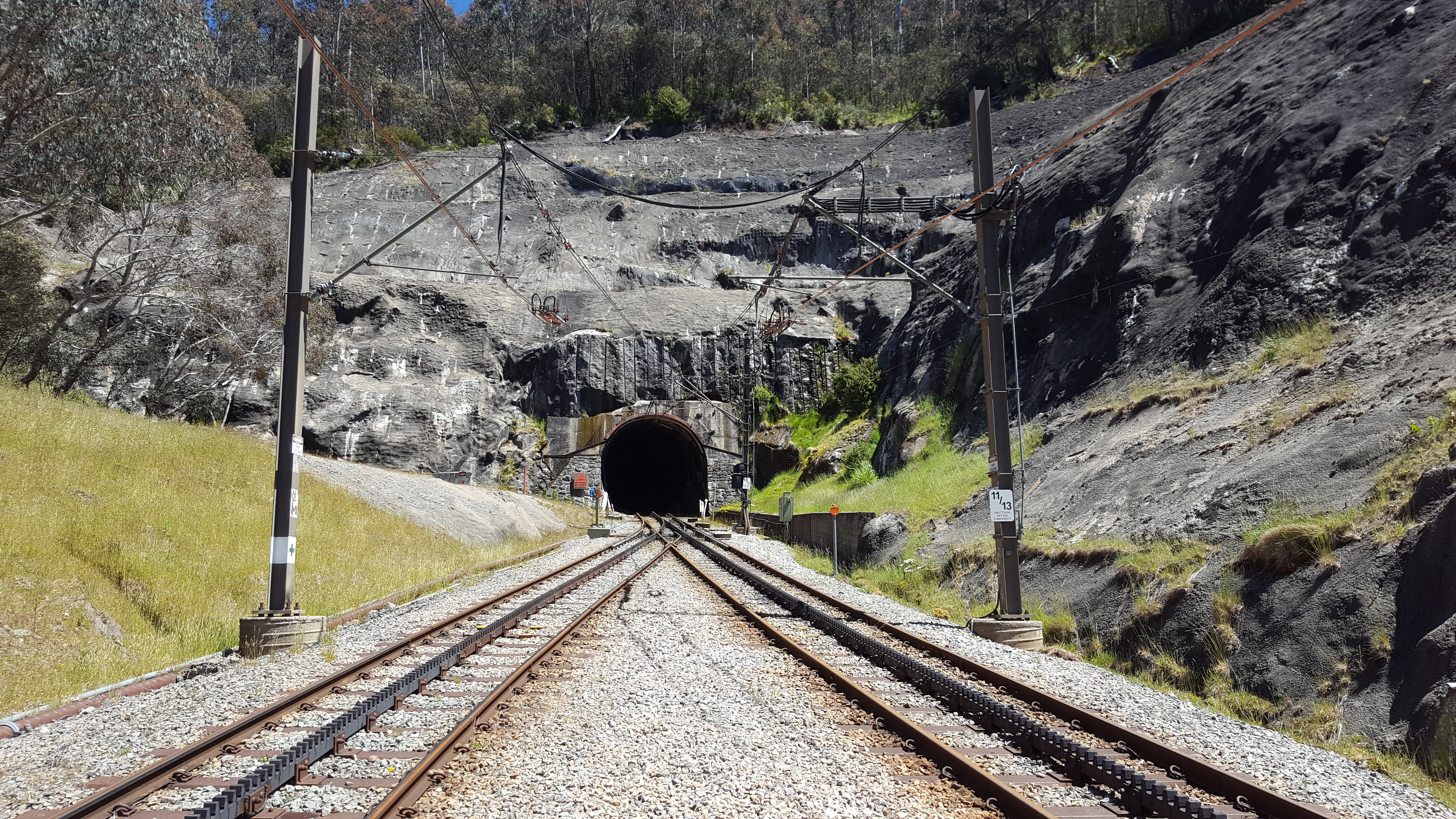
Bilston tunnel in December 2022

In the 1980s, development of the Thredbo and Perisher Valley skifields was increasing, but the mountain road providing access to them was limited. In 1980 the NSW National Parks & Wildlife Service proposed the establishment of a day visitors resort at Blue Cow Mountain, which would increase the traffic demands. A number of transport modes were examined, including a funicular railway, chairlift and an aerial gondola, but all were of limited capacity, affected by weather, and would scar the mountainsides.

A rack and pinion railway was found to be the best option, running mostly underground. The Perisher Skitube Joint Venture was established, with Transfield and Kumagai Gumi each holding a 49% share. The main proponent of the scheme, Canberra engineer Ken Bilston, held the remaining 2% share and was technical manager for the project. Feasibility studies commenced in 1982 for a double track railway on the assumption that the road would close in winter, but this was altered to a single track line with passing loops when the closure was ruled out.

Construction commenced in October 1984, with tunnelling beginning in June 1985. The 3.3 km (2.1 mi) Bilston Tunnel was constructed using a 5.5-metre (18 ft) tunnel boring machine, while the 2.6-kilometre (1.6 mi) Blue Cow tunnel was constructed using the traditional drill and blast method. A consortium of Swiss Locomotive & Machine Works, Brown, Boveri & Cie and Comeng supplied the rolling stock, overhead wiring, sub-stations, communications and signalling.

The 5.9-kilometre (3.7 mi) line opened from Bullocks Flat to Perisher on 26 July 1987. Because the tunnel to Blue Cow was completed, but the track had yet to be laid, services on the Perisher to Blue Cow section were operated by eight ex Highway Tours Leyland Tiger Cub buses for the 1987 ski season. The entire line opened through to Blue Cow opened on 29 August 1988.

In October 2016, Stadler Rail commenced an upgrade of the line. It was to be completed by April 2017.

== Operations ==
The Swiss-designed railway provides easy access between the Alpine Way at Bullocks Flat and the Perisher Blue ski resort sites of Perisher Valley and Blue Cow Mountain. The Skitube passes through two tunnels and has three stations, two of which are underground. The terminal at Bullocks Flat has parking facilities for 3,500 cars and 250 coaches, as well as passenger, administrative and control facilities.

The line begins at an elevation of 1,125 metres (3,691 ft) and runs above ground for 2.6 kilometres (1.6 mi). A 150-metre-long (490 ft) steel curved viaduct and a passing loop are located before entering the tunnel, which climbs on a 12.5% gradient to the Perisher Valley terminal. A provision for a second 300-metre-long (980 ft) passing loop has been made inside the tunnel. To Blue Cow the line first drops downgrade, then climbs 1.3 kilometres (0.8 mi) on a 3% gradient, then climbs at 12.5% to the terminus. The railway reaches a maximum elevation of 1,905 metres (6,250 ft) above sea level at Mount Blue Cow station. The workshops include two sidings for carriages to be stabled in. The stabling yard is enclosed by a tall electric fence and also houses a diesel tractor used for shunting. A small goods wagon is also used to transport rubbish and other freight from the Blue Cow terminal, as it has no road access in the winter months.

An off-peak schedule is run in early to late June and mid to late September, either side of the peak July–September ski season. Trains run between 06:00 and 22:00, allowing for après-ski activities or night skiing. The Bullocks Flat terminus has a large, three-sided station with extensive parking, a pass office, a ski and snowboard school, information desk, kiosk, souvenir shop, and ski and snowboard hire shop. This allows day trippers to get tickets and equipment and be loaded for the 10 minute journey to the Perisher Valley station, and a further seven minutes to Blue Cow. It is adjacent to the Lake Crackenback Resort.

== Technical details ==
The majority of the railway is underground, comprising the Bilston and Blue Cow tunnels, 3.3 km (2.1 mi) and 2.6 km (1.6 mi) long respectively. The depth of the tunnels varies from between 4 and 550 m (13 and 1,804 ft), and their diameter between 5 and 5.5 m (16 and 18 ft). 30 kg/m (60.5 lb/yd) second-hand rail from the State Rail Authority was used to build the line, and two electrical substations are fed with 33 kV 50 Hz AC power, and output 1,500 V DC for the overhead wiring.

== Rolling stock ==
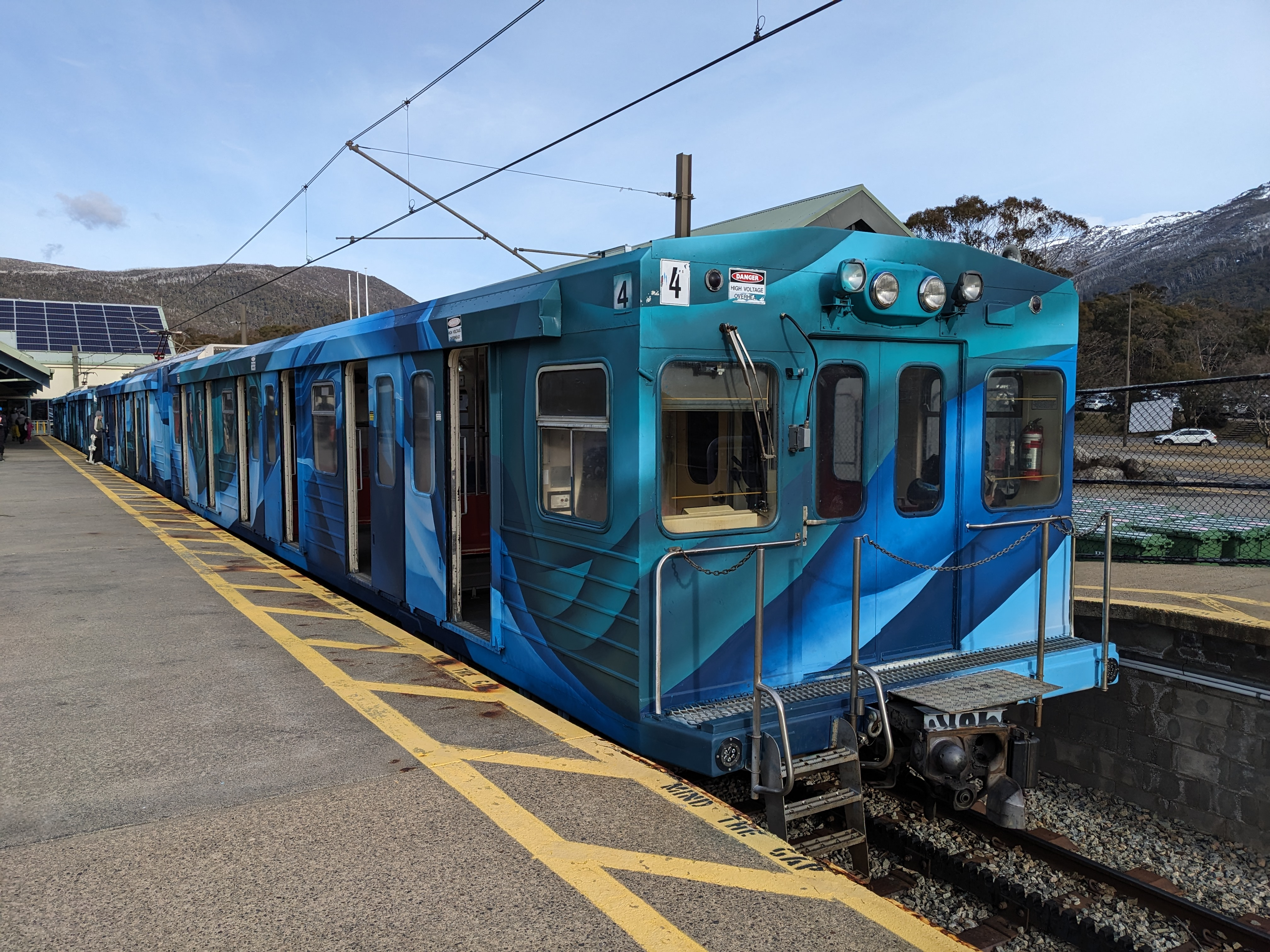
Skitube train at Bullocks Flat terminal in July 2023

To operate the service 11 carriages were built by Comeng, Granville; with power bogies supplied by Swiss Locomotive & Machine Works and traction equipment by Brown, Boveri & Cie. Each is 16.8 m (55 ft 1 3/8 in) long and 3.8 m (12 ft 5 5/8 in) wide, and can carry 225 passengers. This provides for the movement of around 4,500 people per hour. Eleven passenger cars in total were built, four motor cars, four driving trailers and three non driving trailers. The motor cars each have four 301 kW (404 hp) traction motors, making them perhaps the most powerful rack railcars in the world. The braking system is mixed regenerative and rheostatic. The train is capable of 40 km/h (25 mph), however this is limited during the downhill journey to 21 km/h (13 mph).

Two four-wheel S type open wagons were acquired from the State Rail Authority for freight traffic, and cut down to flat wagons. A 1958 Tulloch built locomotive was also purchased.

The trains of the Skitube operate on the Lamella rack system, which was developed by Von Roll Holding.
