= Bullocks Flat =

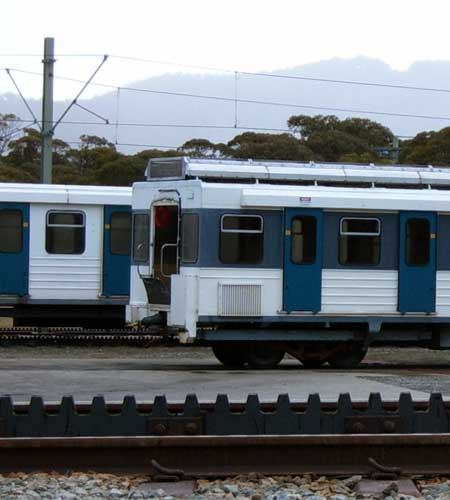
- Skitube railway cars and traction railway track

- Coordinates: 36°26′16″S 148°26′29″E
- Country: Australia
- State: New South Wales
- LGA: Snowy Monaro Regional Council
- Location: 380 km (240 mi) SW of Sydney

Government
  - State electorate: Monaro
  - Federal division: Eden-Monaro
- Elevation: 1,134 m (3,720 ft)
- Postcode: 2627

Bullocks Flat (or Bullock's Flat) is a flat portion of the Thredbo Valley adjacent to the Thredbo River, in the Snowy Mountains region of New South Wales, Australia.

== Skitube ==
The flat is the site of the lower terminus of the Skitube apline railway a traction rack railway that takes skiers from beside the Alpine Way road (leading to the adjacent state of Victoria) below Thredbo, through a steeply inclined railway tunnel, into the Kosciuszko National Park at Perisher Valley and the associated ski resort of Blue Cow Mountain. The resort complex is known commercially as Perisher Ski Resort.

== History ==
=== Indigenous history ===
The Indigenous Australian Ngarigo people first inhabited this area.

=== European history ===
In the 1830s, Europeans began summer alpine grazing of sheep and cattle. In the 1850s, gold was discovered on the Thredbo River, although finds were not extensive. Early in the 1900s, Eucalyptus delegatensis (alpine ash) trees were logged in this area, the logs brought to a steam-powered mill on the western side of the river by bullock teams.

Trout were introduced into the streams in the early 1900s for sport fishing and this remains a popular pastime and tourist activity for the area.

==== Dr Howard Bullock ====
In the 1930s, Howard Bullock, a medical doctor from Sydney, bought a small parcel of flat land in the Thredbo Valley at the confluence of the Thredbo River and the Little Thredbo River. At that time, Bullock and his family took two days to travel by car to this summer getaway where they enjoyed camping, fishing, bushwalking, and horse riding.

In 1934, Charles Conway was contracted to build the one-room cottage. It features built-in bunk beds on either side of the main room that has a central fireplace opposite the one door and two small shuttered windows. A separate kitchen building was added in 1938, and the garage and stables in 1947. The cottage area is maintained by the National Parks & Wildlife Service.

== Lake Crackenback Resort ==
An artificial lake was formed adjacent to the Skitube station around which has been built a holiday resort with chalets for accommodation in both winter and summer. The resort adjoins the Little Thredbo River but the lake is not fed by it. Located on the border of the Kosciuszko National Park, Lake Crackenback Resort is a natural playground nestled in the Thredbo Valley surrounded by the spectacular Snowy Mountains. Lake Crackenback is a perfect base to explore the region from sightseeing, local attractions, snowsports in winter and the many summer activities including walking trails, mountain bikes, canoeing or fishing.

== Gallery ==
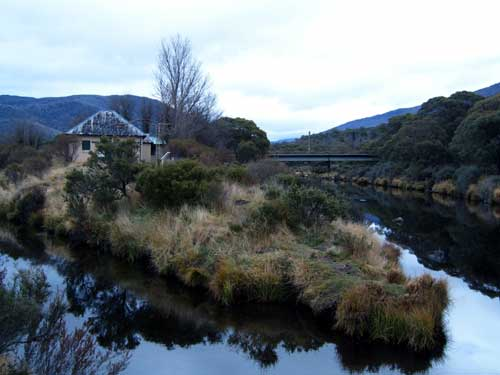
Bullock's Flat homestead and Skitube railway bridge, Thredbo River (right) and Little Thredbo (left).

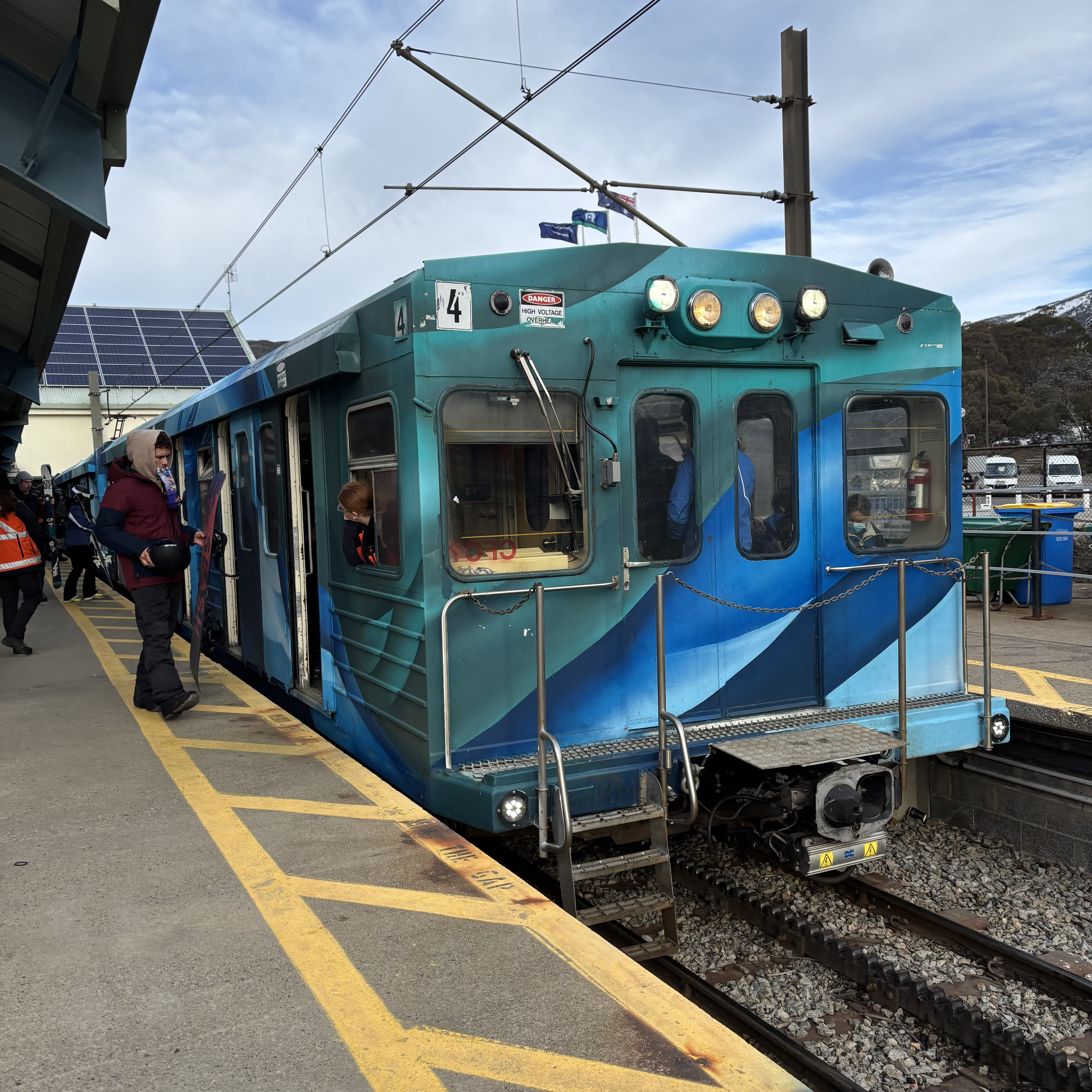
Skitube Train Set 4 at Bullocks Flat station
