= Jindabyne (disambiguation) =

Jindabyne is a town in the Snowy Mountains, Australia

Jindabyne may refer to:

- Jindabyne (film), a 2006 drama directed by Ray Lawrence
- Jindabyne Dam, on the Snowy River in New South Wales, Australia
- Lake Jindabyne, reservoir created by Jindabyne Dam
