= Eucumbene River =

Coordinates: 36°21′S 148°38′E

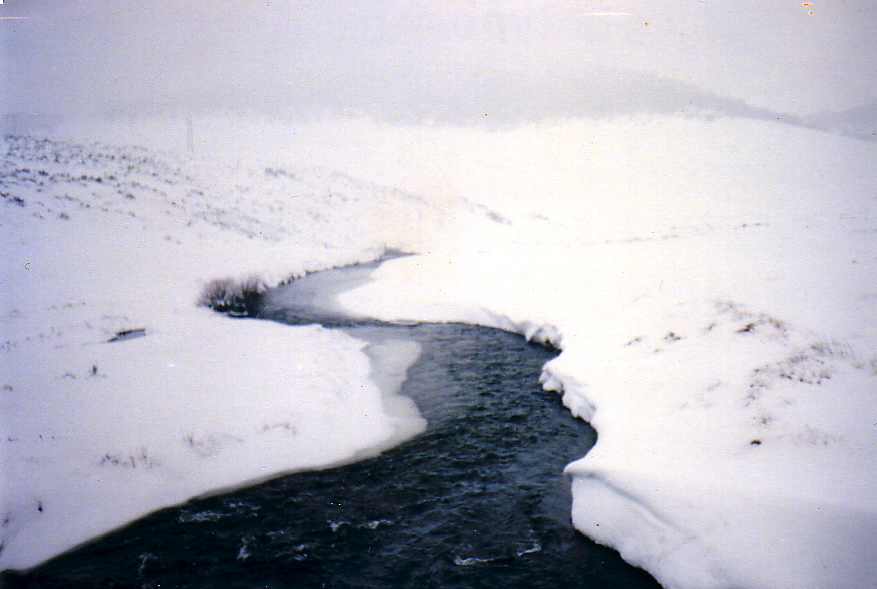
- The Eucumbene River from the Snowy Mountains Highway at Kiandra, 1990.

Location
- Country: Australia
- State: New South Wales
- Region: Australian Alps (IBRA), Snowy Mountains
- Local government area: Snowy Monaro Regional Council
- Town: Jindabyne

Physical characteristics
- Source: Snowy Mountains
  - location: below Shaw Hill
  - elevation: 1,380 m (4,530 ft)
- Mouth: confluence with the Snowy River
  - location: Lake Jindabyne
  - elevation: 900 m (3,000 ft)
- Length: 84 km (52 mi)

Basin features
- River system: Snowy River catchment
- Tributaries
  - left: Chance Creek, Alpine Creek (New South Wales), Gang Gang Creek
  - right: Tabletop Creek, Hughes Creek, Swamp Creek (New South Wales, Snowy River), Big Tolbar Creek
- National park: Kosciuszko NP

The Eucumbene River, a perennial river of the Snowy River catchment, is located in the Snowy Mountains region of New South Wales, Australia.

== Course and features ==
The Eucumbene River rises below Shaw Hill, in the northern part of the Kosciuszko National Park, approximately 10 kilometres (6.2 mi) north of the village of Kiandra. The river flows generally south and southeast before emptying into Lake Eucumbene, where its flow is impounded by Eucumbene Dam. After passing through or over the dam wall, the river flows generally south before emptying into Lake Jindabyne, impounded by Jindabyne Dam. Within Lake Jindabyne, the river reaches its confluence with the Snowy River.

The river descends 476 metres (1,562 ft) over its 84 kilometres (52 mi) course, joined by seven minor tributaries.

The flow of the river is impacted by alpine conditions, with high flows during spring as a result of snowmelt. During winter, the river is subject to snow and ice conditions.

The Snowy Mountains Highway crosses the river at several locations between Adaminaby and Kiandra.

== See also ==
- List of rivers of New South Wales (A–K)
- List of rivers of Australia
- Rivers of New South Wales
- Snowy Mountains Scheme
