= Alpine Way =

Road in New South Wales, Australia

Alpine Way New South Wales
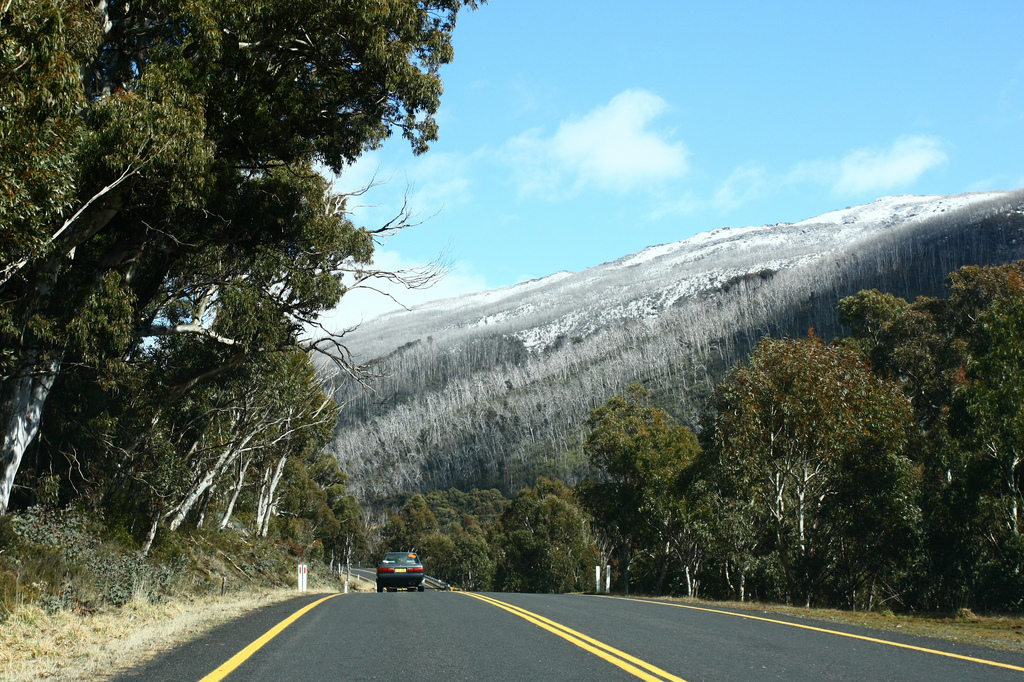
- Alpine Way, near Thredbo
- Coordinates: 36.410636°S 148.595440°E (East end); 36.169133°S 148.024935°E (West end)

General information
- Type: Rural road
- Length: 121.3 km (75 mi)
- Gazetted: January 1993

Major junctions
- East end: Kosciuszko Road; Jindabyne, New South Wales
- Swampy Plains River Road; Tooma Road
- West end: Murray Valley Highway; NSW/VIC border

Location(s)
- Major settlements: Thredbo. Khancoban

Restrictions
- General: Carrying snow chains may be required at certain times of the year

Highway system
- Highways in Australia; National Highway • Freeways in Australia; Highways in New South Wales

Alpine Way is a 121-kilometre (75 mi) rural road located in the Snowy Mountains region of New South Wales, Australia. The road connects Jindabyne in the east to the New South Wales-Victorian border in the west, crossing the Murray River near Bringenbrong and Upper Towong.

== Route ==
Alpine Way commences at the intersection with Kosciuszko Road in Jindabyne, on the eastern side of the Snowy Mountains, and heads in a south-westerly direction, adjacent to the Thredbo River and eventually past Thredbo. It then climbs and crosses the crest of the Great Dividing Range at Dead Horse Gap at an altitude of 1,580 metres (5,180 ft), then winds a descent down to and eventually crosses Snowy Creek at Murray Gorge at an altitude of 580 metres (1,900 ft), very close to the Murray River. Thereafter, it continues in a northerly direction around the western side of the range along the upper reaches of the Murray River Tributaries, crossing the Swampy Plain River at Geehi Hut and continuing northwards to Khancoban. It then heads in a northwesterly direction to eventually cross the Murray River and terminate at Murray Valley Highway on the river's southern bank, within Victoria.

The majority of the road is contained within Kosciuszko National Park and since 2004 has been maintained by Roads & Maritime Services.

=== Road restrictions ===
Road restrictions in the region require all two-wheel drive vehicles carry snow chains between Thredbo and Tom Groggin from the long weekends marking the King's Official Birthday in June and the Labour Day in October. It is also quite possible that snow chains may be needed to drive safely along other (more dangerous) parts of Alpine Way.

== History ==
The road was initially built in the 1950s as part of the access for the Snowy Mountains Scheme. However, the paving of it was only completed approximately forty years later in the 1990s.

The Roads & Traffic Authority declared Main Road 627 along the western portion of Alpine Way, from the border with Victoria along Murray River in Bringenbrong through Khancoban to the western boundary of Kosciuszko National Park to its east, on 15 January 1993. Main Road 677 was declared along the eastern portion of Alpine Way, from Jindabyne to the eastern boundary of Kosciuszko National Park at Bullocks Flat, on 31 October 1997; this was extended west along the remaining section of Alpine Way to the western boundary of Kosciuszko National Park east of Khancoban on 17 May 2004.

The passing of the Roads Act of 1993 updated road classifications and the way they could be declared within New South Wales. Under this act, Alpine Way retains its declaration as Main Roads 627 and 677.

== Major intersections ==
State	LGA	Location	km	mi	Destinations	Notes
New South Wales	Snowy Monaro	Jindabyne	0.0	0.0	Kosciuszko Road - Charlotte Pass, Berridale, Cooma	Eastern terminus of Alpine Way
New South Wales	Little Thredbo River		16.8	10.4	Bridge (no known official name)	
New South Wales	Snowy Monaro	Thredbo	32.0	19.9	Banjo Drive - Thredbo	
New South Wales	Thredbo River		36.2	22.5	Bridge (no known official name)	
New South Wales	Snowy Creek		54.8	34.1	Bridge (no known official name)	
New South Wales	Snowy Valleys	Geehi	75.7	47.0	Behrs Flat Track – Geehi Hut	
New South Wales	Swampy Plain River		75.8	47.1	Bridge (no known official name)	
New South Wales	Snowy Valleys	Khancoban	106.9	66.4	Scammel Street - Khancoban	
New South Wales	Snowy Valleys	Khancoban	113.0	70.2	Swampy Plains River Road - Cabramurra, Kiandra	
New South Wales	Snowy Valleys	Bringenbrong	119.2	74.1	Tooma Road - Tooma, Tumbarumba	
New South Wales	Snowy Valleys	Bringenbrong	121.3	75.4	Alpine Way - Tooma, Tumbarumba	Western terminus of Alpine Way
New South Wales	Murray River		121.3	75.4	Bringenbrong Bridge	
State border			121.3	75.4	New South Wales – Victoria state border	
Victoria	Towong	Towong–Upper Towong boundary	121.3	75.4	Murray Valley Highway (B400) - Corryong, Wodonga, Swan Hill	Eastern terminus of Murray Valley Highway, route B400 continues west
1.000 mi = 1.609 km; 1.000 km = 0.621 mi: Route transition

== See also ==
- List of highways in New South Wales
- 1997 Thredbo landslide
- Barry Way
