= Thredbo River =

Coordinates: 36°24′45″S 148°29′40″E

Thredbo River Crackemback River, Crackenback River
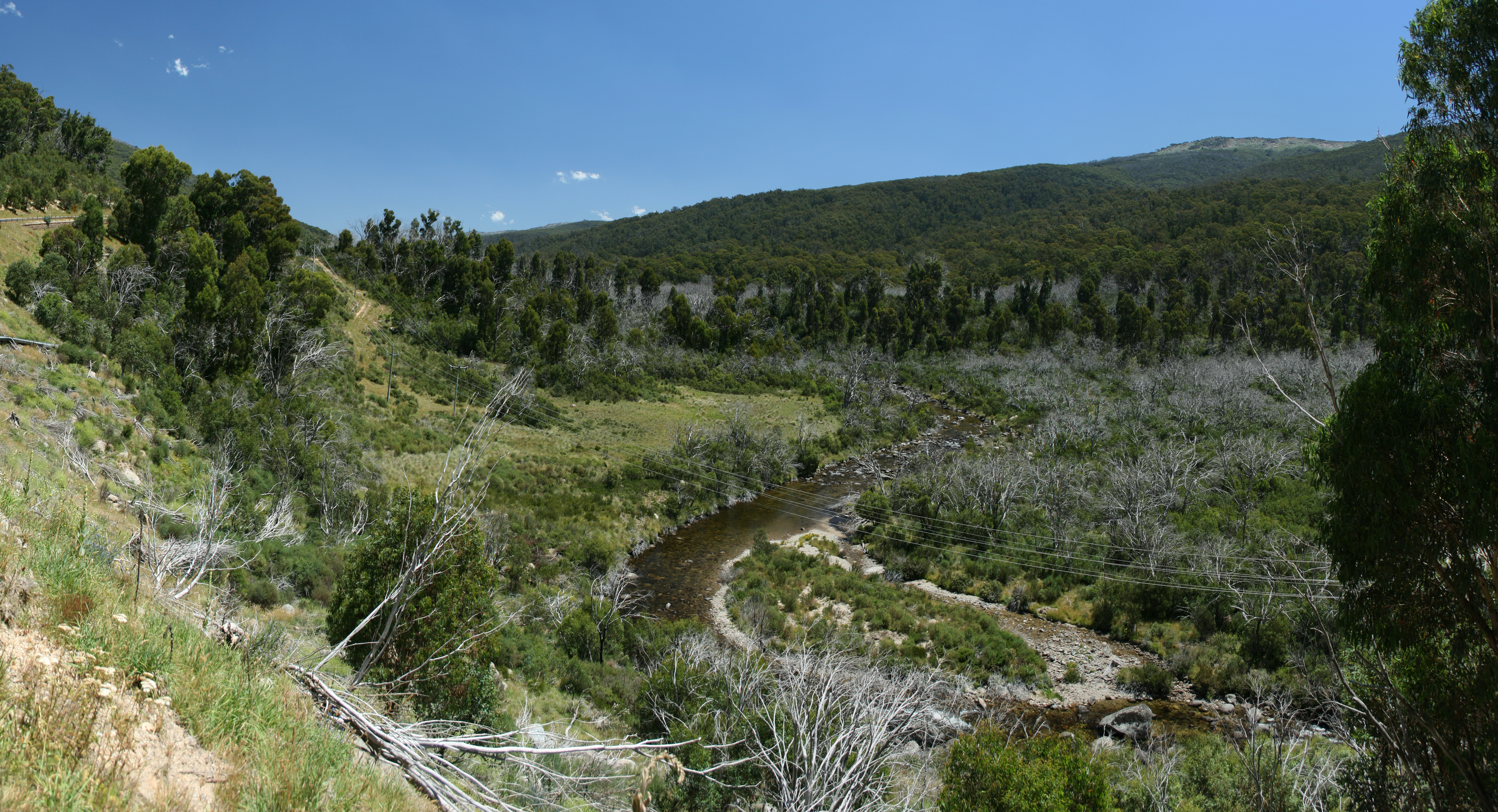
- Thredbo River from the Alpine Way in Kosciuszko National Park.

Location
- Country: Australia
- State: New South Wales
- Region: Australian Alps (IBRA), Snowy Mountains
- Local government area: Snowy Monaro Regional Council
- Town: Thredbo

Physical characteristics
- Source: Mount Leo, Snowy Mountains
  - location: below South Rams Head
  - elevation: 1,550 m (5,090 ft)
- Mouth: confluence with the Snowy River
  - location: Lake Jindabyne
  - elevation: 901 m (2,956 ft)
- Length: 40 km (25 mi)

Basin features
- River system: Snowy River catchment
- Tributaries
  - left: Sawpit Creek
  - right: Big Boggy, Bull Creek (New South Wales), Little Thredbo River
- National park: Kosciuszko NP

The Thredbo River, a perennial river of the Snowy River catchment, is located in the Snowy Mountains region of New South Wales, Australia.

== Course and features ==
The Thredbo River rises below South Rams Head, near Mount Leo within the Kosciuszko National Park. The river flows generally adjacent to the Alpine Way, west and northwest near Dead Horse Gap, then generally north, passing through the village of Thredbo, joined by four tributaries including the Little Thredbo River, before emptying into Lake Jindabyne, impounded by Jindabyne Dam. Within Lake Jindabyne, the river reaches its confluence with the Snowy River.

The river descends 649 metres (2,129 ft) over its 40 kilometres (25 mi) course.

The flow of the river is impacted by alpine conditions; with high flows during spring as a result of snow melt. Meanwhile, during winter, the river is subject to snow and ice conditions.

== Historical alternative names ==
The river was once also known by an alternative name, Crackenback River. It was officially named 'Thredbo or Crackenback River', until January 1976, when it was renamed 'Thredbo River'.

== Gallery ==
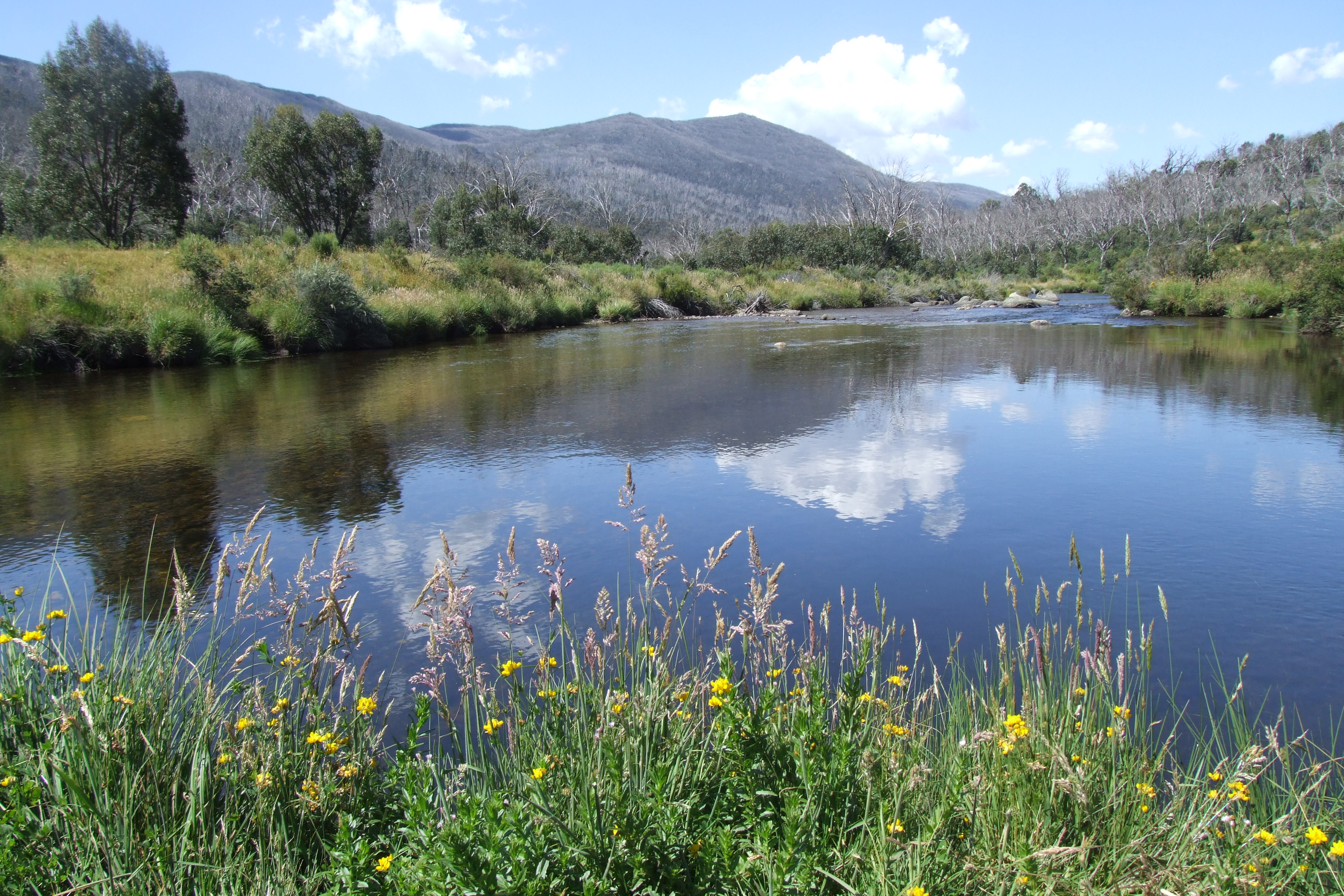
Thredbo River near the Diggings campground in Kosciuszko National Park.

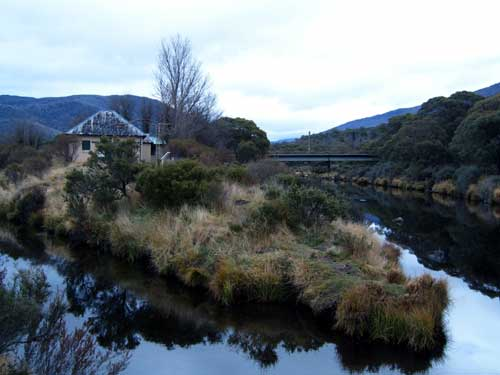
Confluence of Thredbo River (R) with the Little Thredbo River (L) at Bullocks Flat.

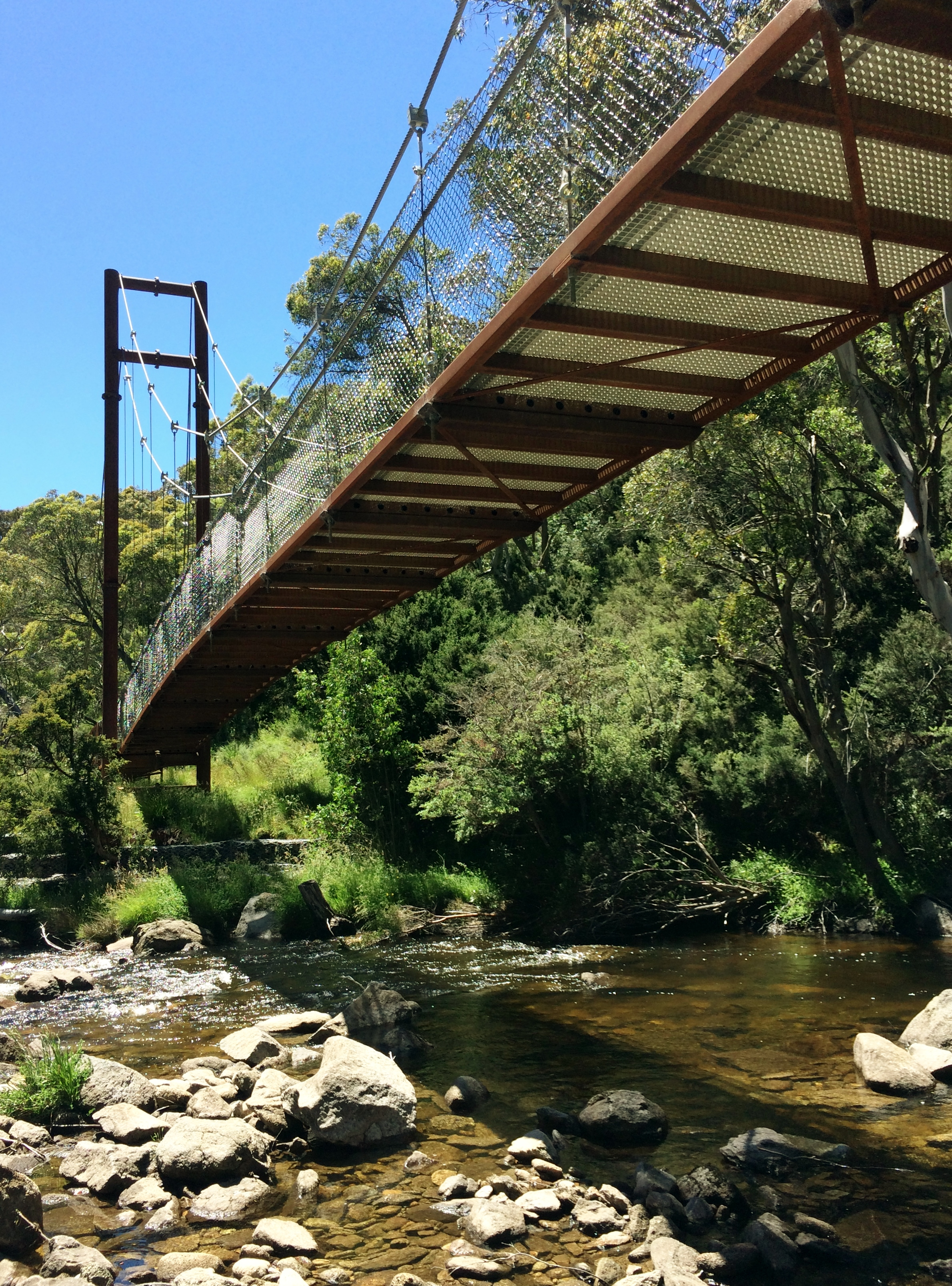
Bridge over Thredbo River for Thredbo Valley Track

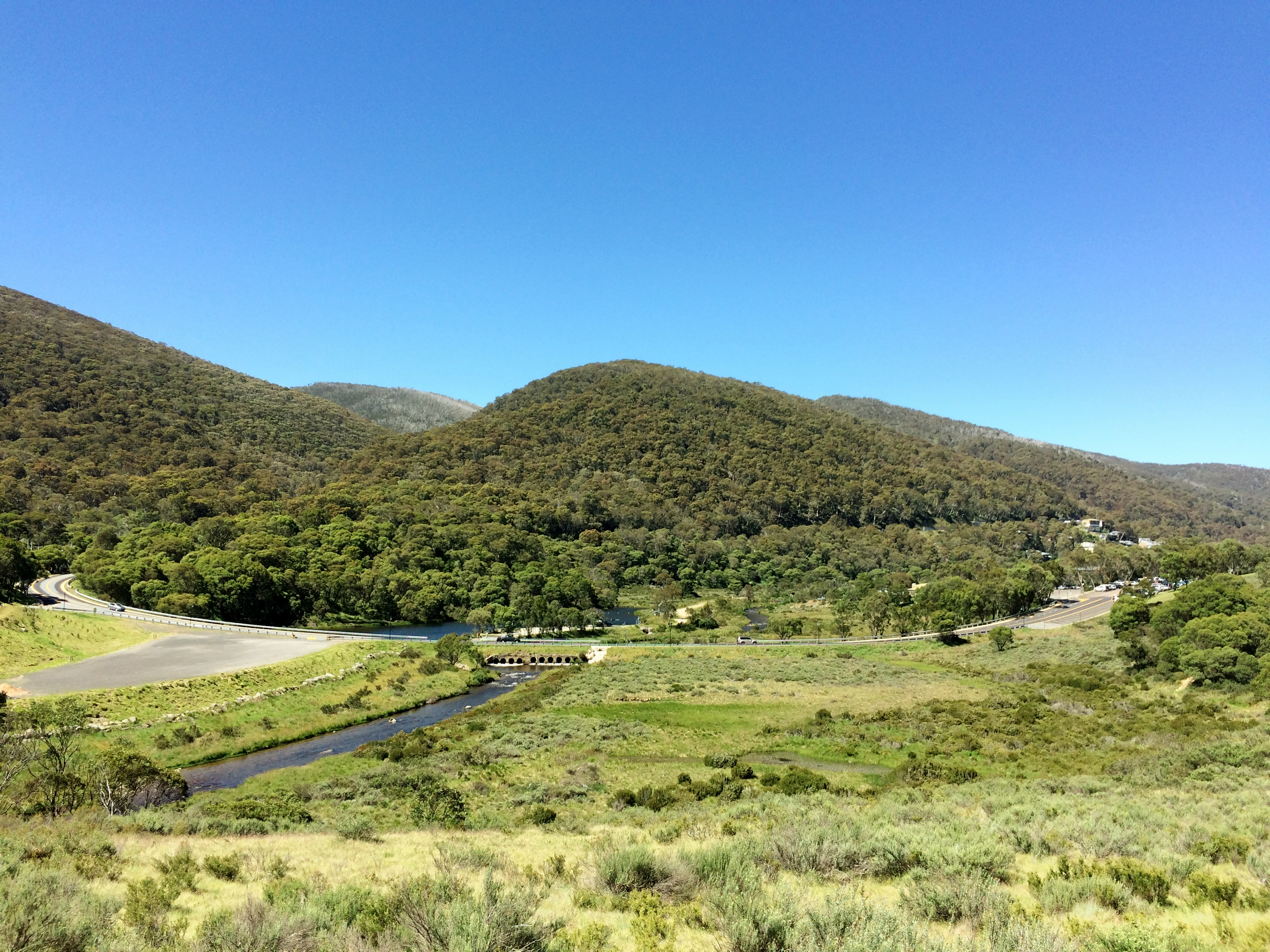
Thredbo River at eastern edge of Thredbo Village

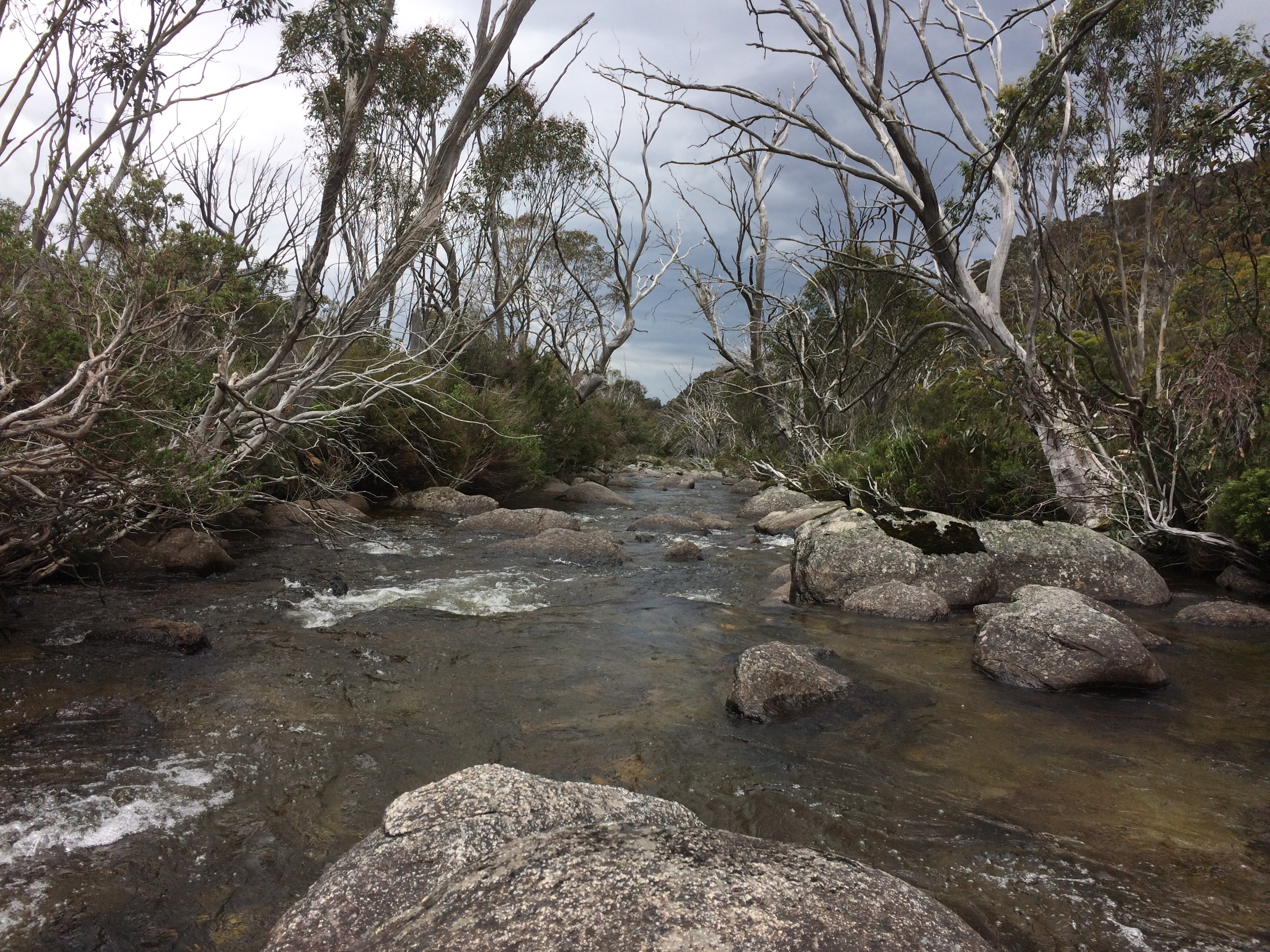
Thredbo River upstream of Thredbo Village

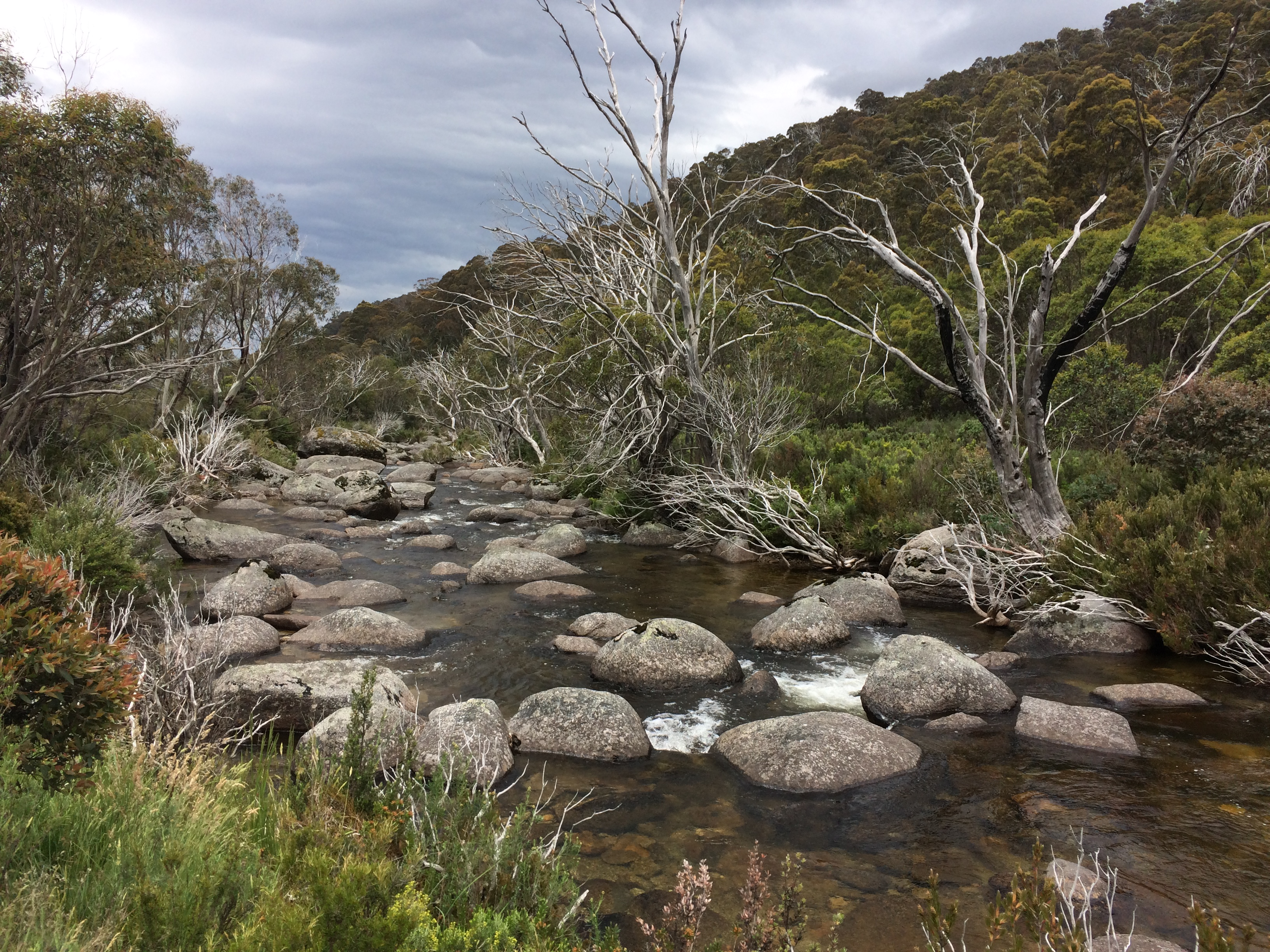
Thredbo River upstream of Thredbo Village

== See also ==
- List of rivers of New South Wales (L–Z)
- List of rivers of Australia
- Rivers of New South Wales
- Snowy Mountains Scheme
