= Thredbo =

Ski and mountain bike resort in New South Wales, Australia

Thredbo Alpine Village

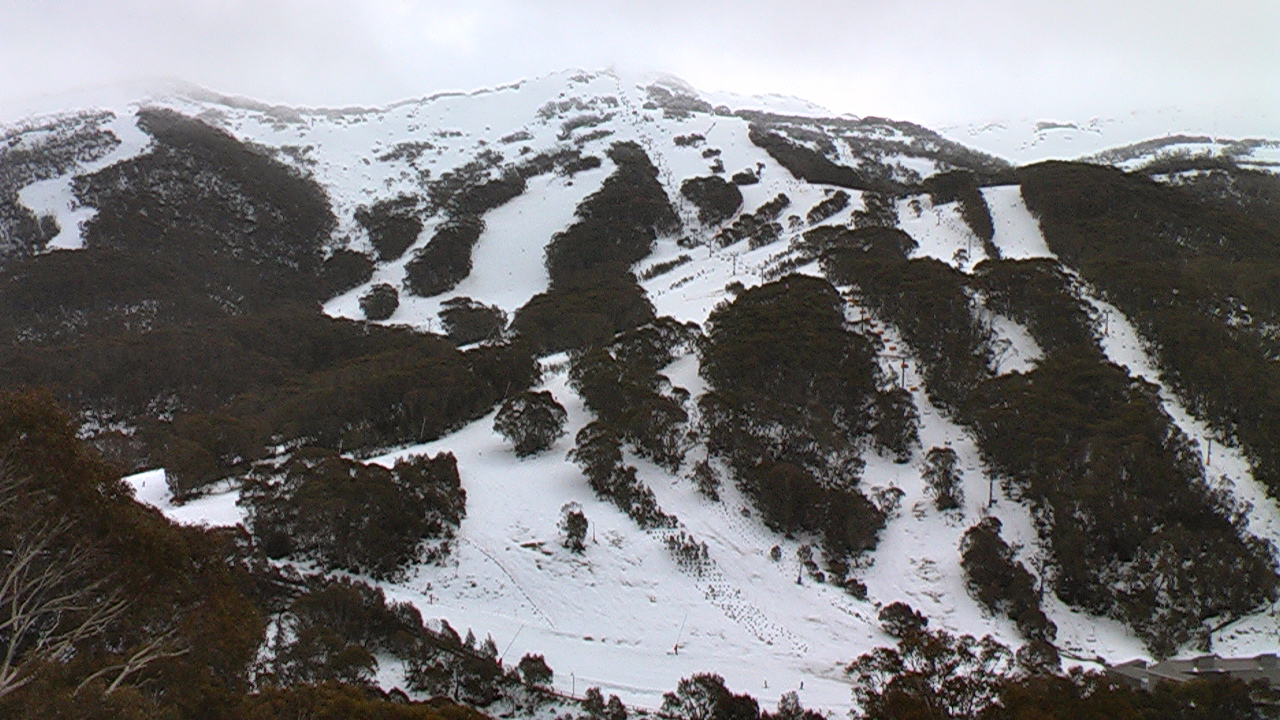
- Thredbo, July 2011

- Location within New South Wales Location within Australia
- Location: Australian Alps, New South Wales
- Nearest city: Canberra
- Coordinates: 36°30′17″S 148°18′20″E
- Top elevation: 2,037 m (6,683 ft)
- Base elevation: 1,365 m (4,478 ft)
- Skiable area: 480 ha (1,200 acres)
- Trails: >50
- Longest run: 5 km or 3.1 mi (Village Trail from Karel's T-bar down to Friday Flat)
- Lift system: 14 lifts
- Snowfall: 2,040 mm (80 in)
- Website: Official Site

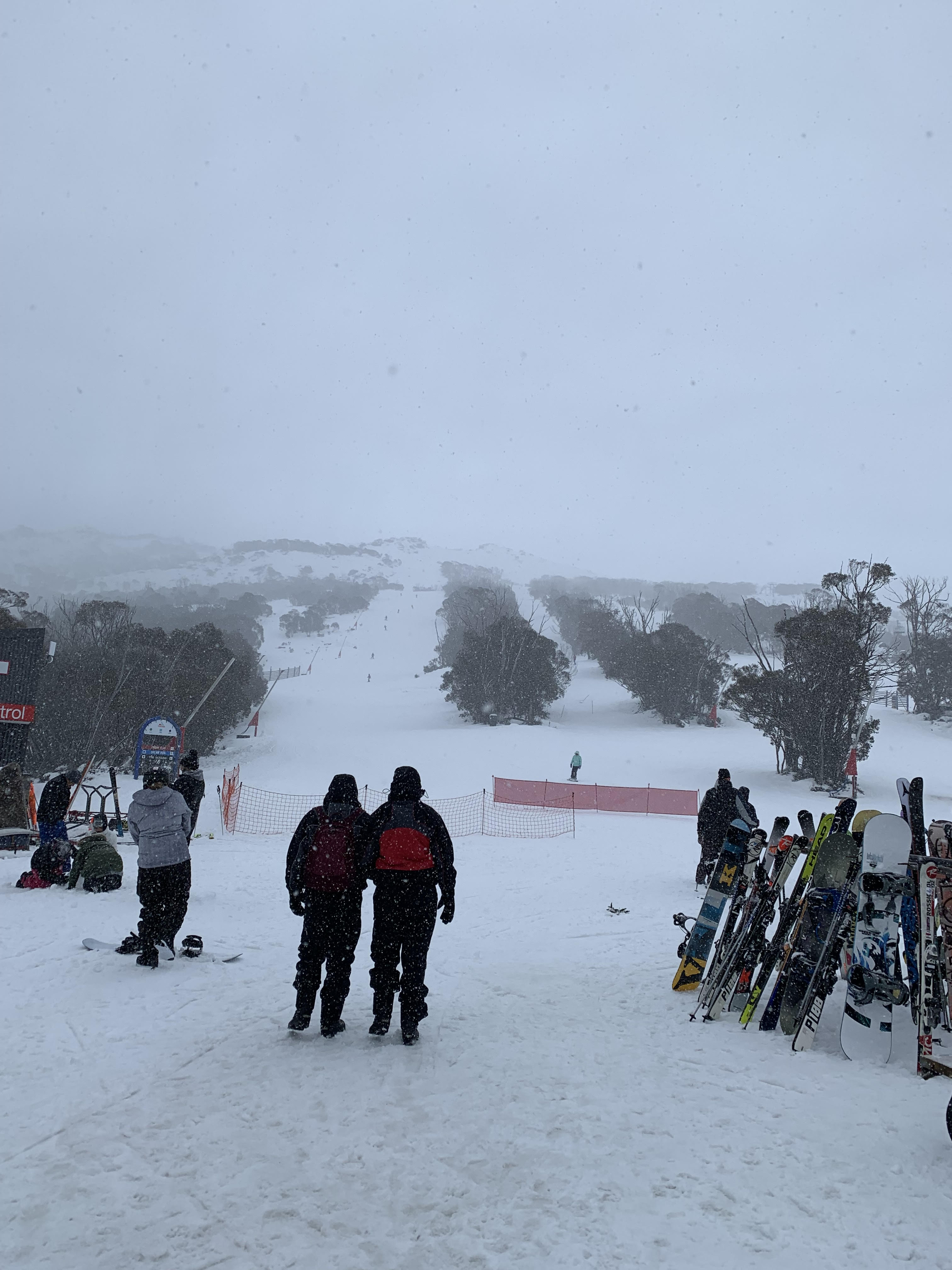
Merrits

Thredbo is a village and ski resort in the Snowy Mountains of New South Wales, Australia. It is approximately 500 kilometres (310 mi) south of Sydney, accessible by the Alpine Way via Cooma, Berridale and Jindabyne. The village is built in the valley of the Thredbo River, also known as the Crackenback River, at the foot of the Ramshead Range.

The town has approximately 4,150 beds, but a permanent population of only approximately 477 people. When the mountain is fully covered by snow, Thredbo has the longest ski runs in Australia, attracting approximately 700,000 winter visitors annually. In summer, Thredbo is a hiking and summer sport destination, offering rock climbing and abseiling, fishing, cross-country cycling and downhill MTB riding and hosts a blues music festival, with approximately 300,000 summer visitors (figures are as of 2005).

== History ==
Thredbo resort was developed by a syndicate of people who were at the time working on the Snowy Mountains Scheme. In 1957, the syndicate was granted a head-lease over the area that Thredbo now occupies. Development occurred in the following years under Lendlease. In January 1987, Amalgamated Holdings Limited (AHL) purchased the head lease from Lendlease. EVT Limited operates Thredbo village's services, real estate, and lease arrangements as a public company; however, a range of private businesses operate around the year providing activities, shopping, restaurants, accommodation, tours and nightlife.

== Ski resort ==
Skiing at Friday Flat beginners area.

Skiing at Merrits

Thredbo is an Australian ski resort set within Kosciuszko National Park in NSW and was modelled on a European skiing town, reflecting the heritage of workers on the Snowy Mountains Scheme such as Tony Sponar, who is credited with having established the location as a ski field. Contrasting with the primarily lodge-based Perisher, Thredbo is a town with lodges, shopping and nightlife. Thredbo has 14 lifts: an 8-person gondola, 3 hi-speed quads, 1 quad, 5 t-bars, 1 double chair (following the removal of Merritts Chairlift in 2020, and the Ramshead Chairlift in 2010), and 3 snow runners.

Thredbo has the steepest overall terrain of any ski resort in mainland Australia, and also the highest lifted point (2,037 m or 6,683 ft AHD). From this highest access point at Karel's T-Bar, the lease-holder Kosciuszko Thredbo and private adventure companies have access for backcountry ski tours to Mt. Kosciuszko and multiple other locations on the Main Range. Thredbo Village sits at the base of the Crackenback Valley. Due to its low elevation (1,365 m or 4,478 ft) the ski slopes do not always retain snow on the lower half of the mountain as a result of higher temperatures, although temperature inversions at night and below zero temperatures enable snow making. Because of this, Thredbo has invested almost $6 million in the largest snowmaking system in the Southern Hemisphere, covering some 65 hectares of trail and using a three-stage automated process. The system is operated mainly at night to top up the lower half of the mountain and any other high traffic areas. The automated areas include the Supertrail, Friday Flat, High Noon, The Cruiser area's Walkabout and Ballroom, Sundowner, Lovers Leap bypass, World Cup, and Lower True Blue.

Thredbo has over 50 ski runs and employs a standard 3-colour grade system; green for beginners, blue intermediate and black diamond advanced. The longest continual run is from the top of Karel's T-Bar to Friday Flat and is 5.9 km long; however, this is composed of several trails. The longest single run is the Crackenback Supertrail, which is the longest run in Australia.

During the Vietnam War, Australia was one of the destinations soldiers could pick for a week-long R & R. At Sydney Airport the USO had different activities that could be chosen if the soldier wished. One option was skiing at Thredbo at a reduced rate. The package included round trip transportation (part by air, part bus), lodging, breakfast and dinner, equipment, a group lesson, and a lift ticket. Also included were gloves, ski pants, and a warm jacket; soldiers in Vietnam didn't have any of these items, and so needed them to be furnished.

At the end of the season, mats were placed on the lower slopes, enabling one to ski to the bottom.

The village offers a free shuttle bus service during winter that links the Valley Terminal, Friday Flat, and the majority of the ski lodges throughout the village.

=== Lifts ===
Name	Year built	Lift Type	Length (m, ft)	Vertical Rise (m, ft)	Base Elevation (m, ft)	Terminal Elevation (m, ft)
Kosciuszko Express (Formally Crackenback Express, renamed in 2000)	1990	Express Quad	1,860 (6,100)	560 (1,840)	1,365 (4,478)	1,925 (6,316)
Gunbarrel Express	1988	Express Quad	1,679 (5,509)	426 (1,398)	1,365 (4,478)	1,791 (5,876)
The Cruiser	1994	Express Quad	999 (3,278)	214 (702)	1,660 (5,450)	1,874 (6,148)
Easy Does It (Not to be confused with Easy Rider, the Merritts terrain park T-Bar)	1988	Fixed-Grip Quad	275 (902)	65 (213)	1,365 (4,478)	1,430 (4,690)
Snowgums	1980	Double Chair	1,735 (5,692)	472 (1,549)	1,365 (4,478)	1,837 (6,027)
Merritts Chairlift (Decommissioned)	1968	Double Chair	1,350 (4,430)	300 (980)	1,365 (4,478)	1,665 (5,463)
Ramshead (Decommissioned)	1963	Double Chair	1,770 (5,810)	480 (1,570)	1,365 (4,478)	1,845 (6,053)
Basin	1963	T-Bar	650 (2,130)	145 (476)	1,820 (5,970)	1,965 (6,447)
Karels	1978	T-Bar	484 (1,588)	83 (272)	1,954 (6,411)	2,037 (6,683)
Antons	1977	T-Bar	800 (2,600)	230 (750)	1,732 (5,682)	1,962 (6,437)
Sponars	1978	T-Bar	942 (3,091)	260 (850)	1,720 (5,640)	1,980 (6,500)
Merritts Gondola	2020	Gondola	1,360 (4,460)	298 (978)	1,365 (4,478)	1,663 (5,456)

=== Terrain parks ===
Thredbo has several terrain parks;

- Wombat World – a terrain park for younger children, featuring bumps, fun boxes and arches. Located on Friday Flat.
- Merritts Park – A terrain park for beginners to intermediates, featuring jumps and boxes. It is located at the base of the Cruiser chairlift, and can be accessed from the Merritts Mountain House Restaurant. A T-bar runs from the base for exit from this park.
- Cruiser Park – This park features rails, boxes, big jumps and a picnic table. The layout is regularly changed. Located just below the top of "The Cruiser" chair.
- Antons Park – A terrain park for experienced freestyle skiers and boarders with large jumps, rails and a wall ride. Located on Antons.
- Ridercross – Changes location from year to year.

=== Gunbarrel Express chairlift ===
The Gunbarrel Express is a detachable quad chairlift in Thredbo. It runs from the Friday Flat beginners area to a point on The Traverse trail roughly halfway between the Central Spur and the Merritts Spur. The lift was constructed in 1988 as part of a thirty million (Australian) dollar investment in the mountain by its new owners, Amalgamated Holdings Limited. It is unique in Thredbo in that it crosses over other lifts, namely the Easy Does It fixed-grip quad and the Merritts fixed-grip double. This chairlift provides good access to a variety of runs and is convenient to the Woodridge and Friday Flat lodges, as well as major carparks.

Two runs, The Glades and Pegasus, run underneath the higher part of the Gunbarrel Express, with the former running into the latter. The lower half is significantly steeper, with many concealed obstacles, including a creek. Pegasus often suffers from only partial snow cover and is out-of-bounds for most of the season, only opening after significant snowfall.

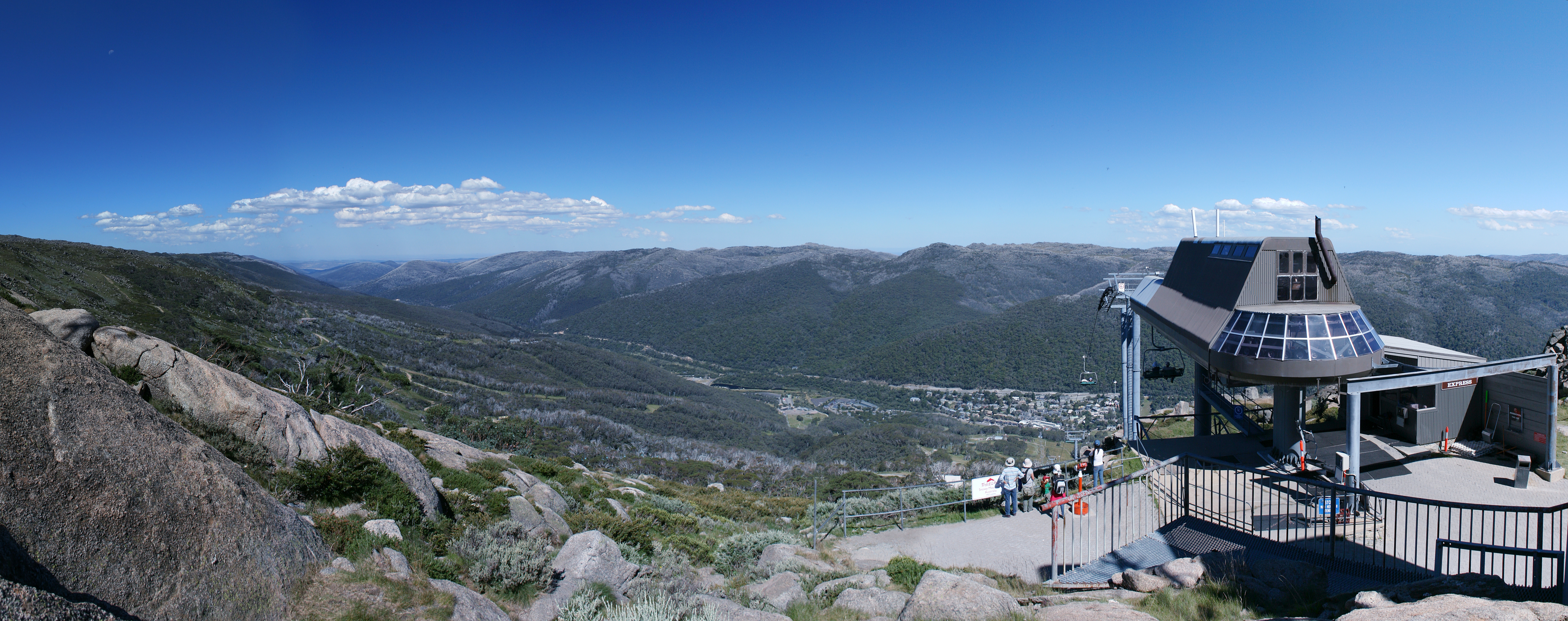
Panoramic view of Thredbo Village and the Thredbo River valley from the Kosciuszko Express Terminal

Statistics:

- Base elevation: 1,365 m (4,478 ft)
- Base location: Friday Flat
- Terminal elevation: 1,791 m (5,876 ft)
- Terminal location: The Traverse, approx. halfway between Cruiser terminal and Antons base.
- Length: 1,679 m (5,509 ft)
- Vertical Rise: 426 m (1,398 ft)
- Average gradient: 1 in 3.9

=== Merritts Gondola ===
Merritts Gondola, built by Doppelmayr, opened in 2020 and is Australia's first purpose-built Gondola. It replaced the previous Merritts Chairlift while quadrupling its capacity, lifting approximately 2,000 people per hour.

== 1997 Thredbo landslide ==
Eighteen people died when the Bimbadeen and Carinya lodges collapsed at Thredbo Alpine Village at 11:30 pm on 30 July 1997. John Cameron, a member of Brindabella Ski Club, and 17 residents of Bimbadeen Ski Lodge lost their lives when Carinya (owned by the Brindabella Ski Club) and Bimbadeen Lodges collapsed when the slope above Carinya Lodge slipped downhill, destroying Carinya. Bimbadeen Staff Lodge was then hit, and it too collapsed. Witnesses reported hearing "a whoosh of air, a crack and a sound like a freight train rushing the hill". The sole survivor, Stuart Diver, was pulled from the wreckage after lying trapped for three days. Stuart was confined to a small space between two concrete slabs where his wife, Sally, drowned beside him in a torrent of water, which Stuart was able to keep his face above.

The landslide was caused by a water leak from a ruptured water pipe that ran alongside the Alpine Road situated above the two lodges. The leaking water pipe caused the ground to become lubricated, allowing the top layer to slip away from the lower part.

Brindabella Ski Club opened its new lodge on 5 June 2004.

== Transport ==
Thredbo operates shuttle buses in the winter. These shuttle buses connect Friday Flats, Valley Terminal and the lodges in Thredbo together. Buses and coaches operated by Cooma Coaches also run services from Jindabyne and Cooma.

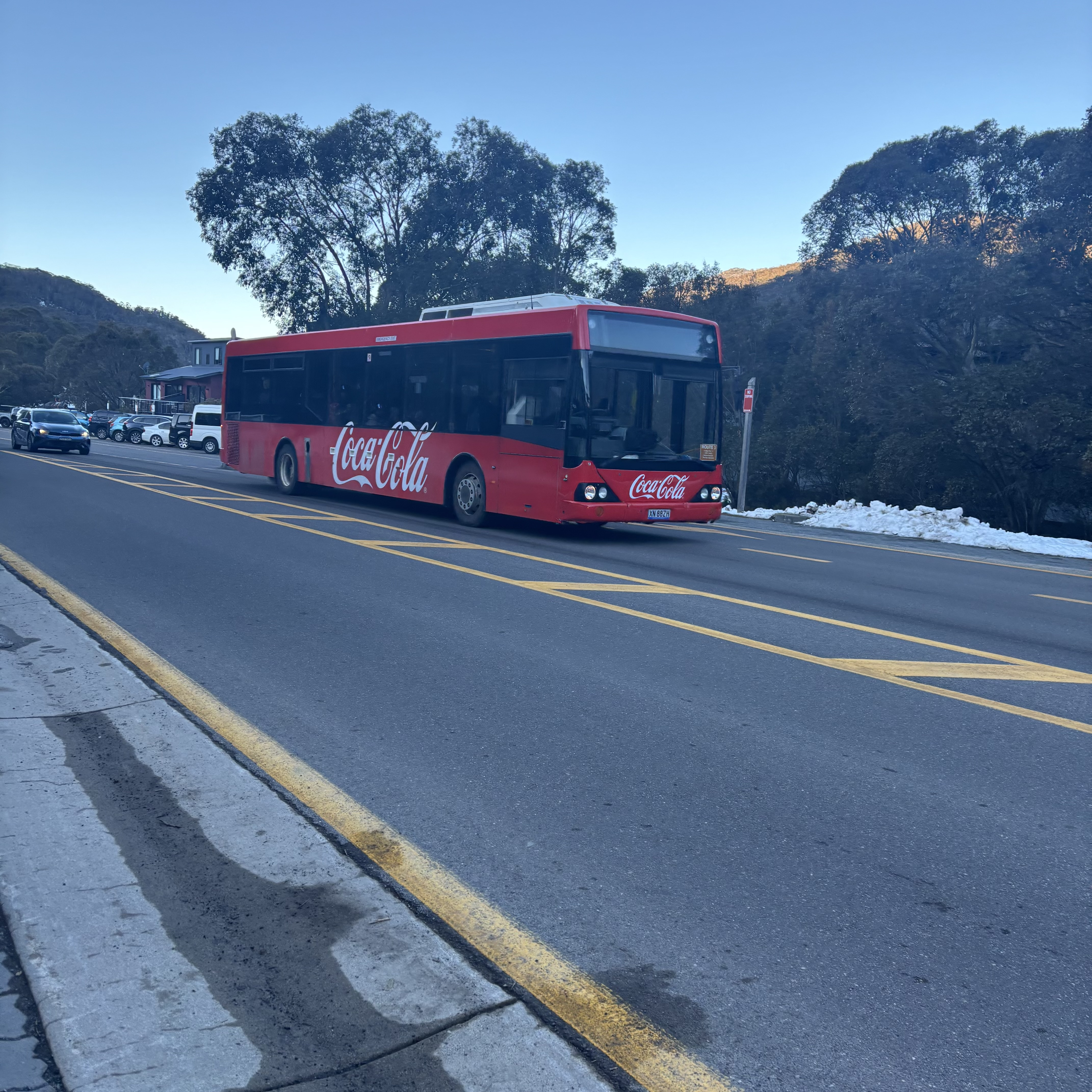
a Thredbo shuttle bus on route 3 Friday Flats and Valley Terminal

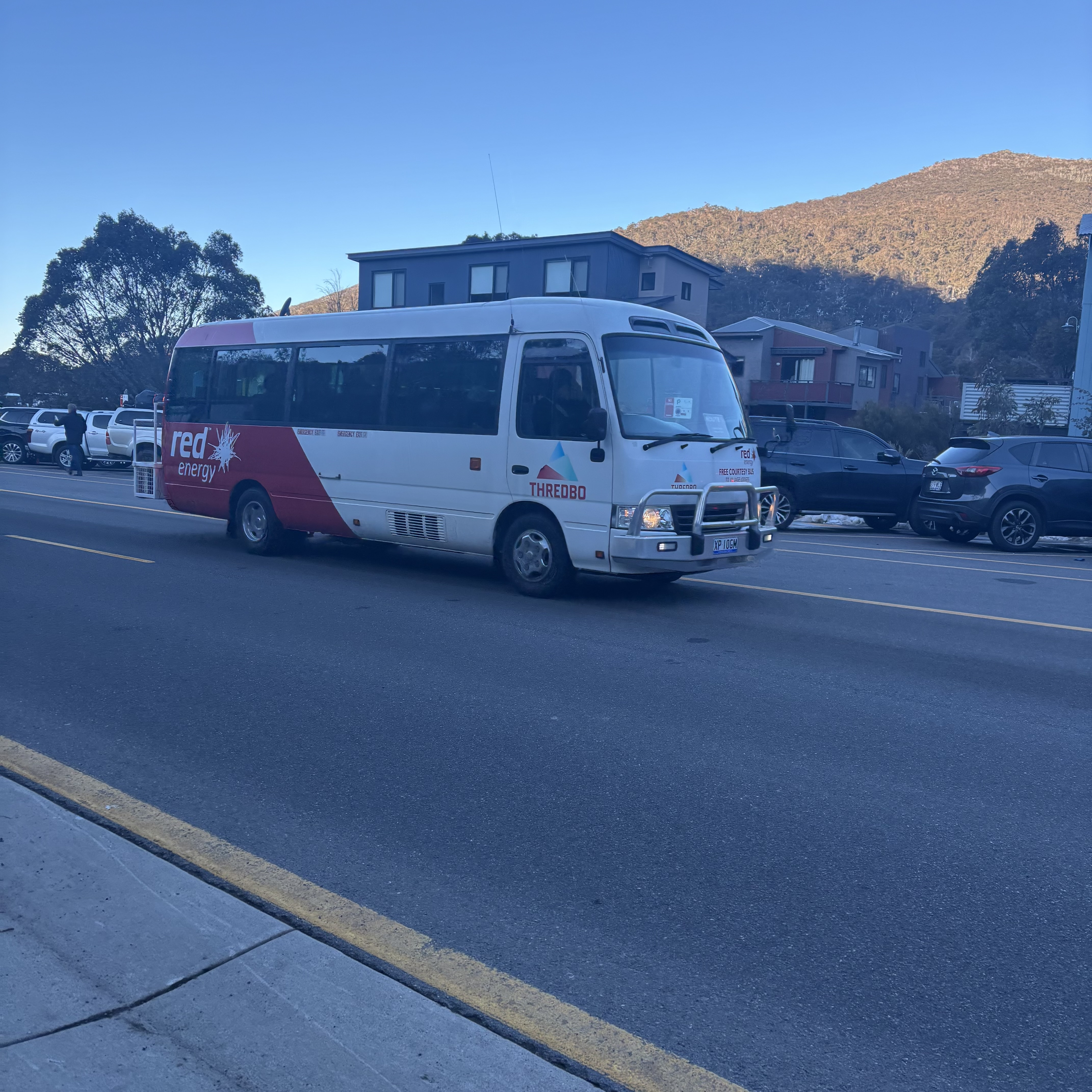
a Red Energy Thredbo Shuttle bus

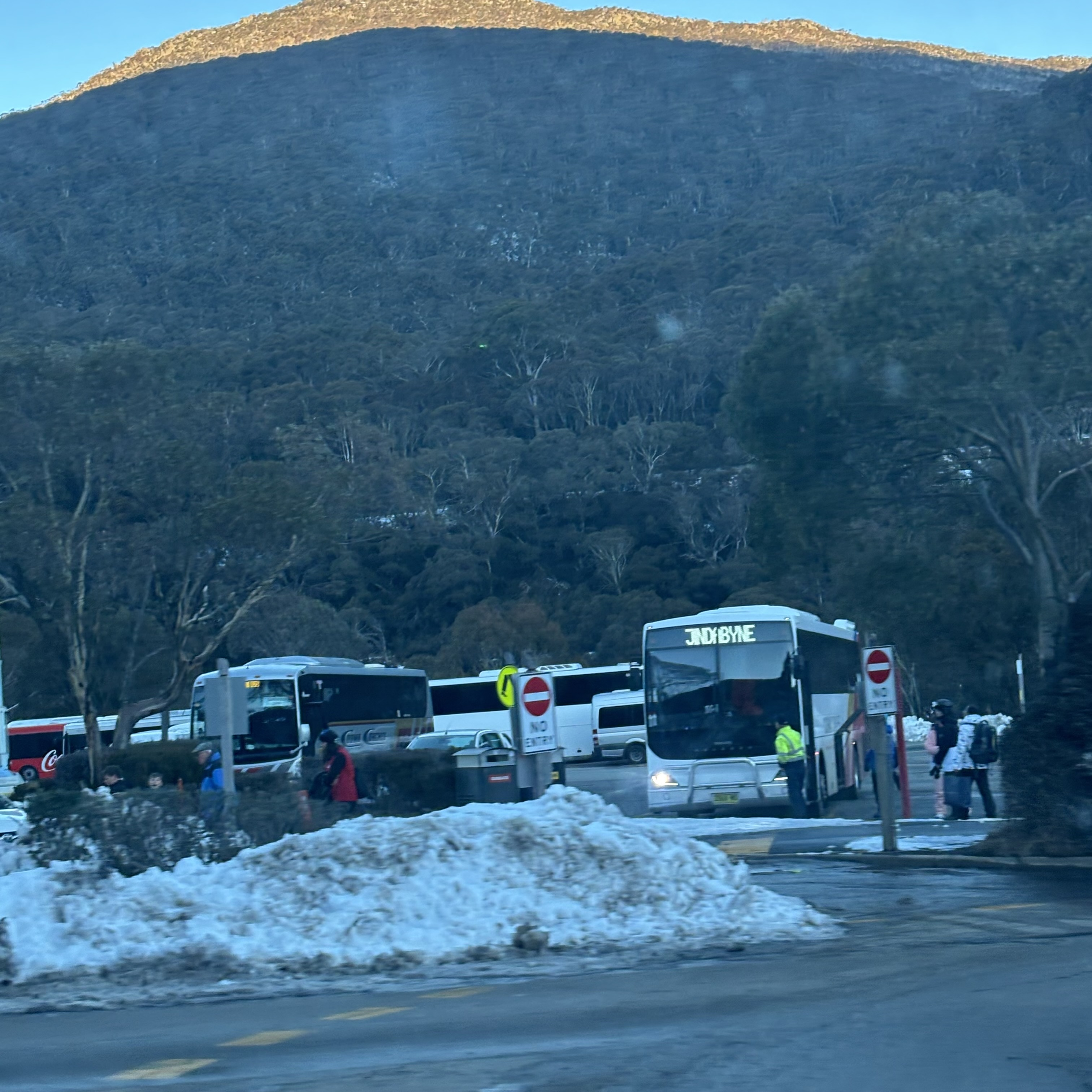
buses and coaches at Thredbo

== Climate ==
Climate data for the area are taken from a station in the village at the bottom of the ski resort and another station at the top of the mountain—some 577 metres (1,890 ft) higher.

The climate of the area is typical of the Snowy Mountains; cold, snowy winters and cool to mild summers (summer snow is not uncommon in Thredbo). Temperatures have ranged from −12.8 to 34.8 °C (9.0 to 94.6 °F). In the Köppen climate classification Thredbo Village would fit the criteria of having a cold oceanic climate (Cfb). The village receives an average of 34.9 snowy days annually.

Climate data for Thredbo Village (1991–2020, extremes 1969–2025); 1,380 m (4,530 ft) AMSL; 36.50° S, 148.30° E
Month	Jan	Feb	Mar	Apr	May	Jun	Jul	Aug	Sep	Oct	Nov	Dec	Year
Record high °C (°F)	34.8 (94.6)	33.0 (91.4)	28.9 (84.0)	24.5 (76.1)	19.6 (67.3)	15.5 (59.9)	13.0 (55.4)	16.6 (61.9)	21.5 (70.7)	24.1 (75.4)	29.5 (85.1)	32.0 (89.6)	34.8 (94.6)
Mean daily maximum °C (°F)	22.2 (72.0)	21.1 (70.0)	18.3 (64.9)	14.0 (57.2)	10.0 (50.0)	6.7 (44.1)	5.6 (42.1)	6.7 (44.1)	10.5 (50.9)	13.9 (57.0)	17.1 (62.8)	19.6 (67.3)	13.8 (56.9)
Daily mean °C (°F)	15.1 (59.2)	14.2 (57.6)	11.6 (52.9)	7.8 (46.0)	4.7 (40.5)	2.2 (36.0)	1.3 (34.3)	2.1 (35.8)	5.2 (41.4)	8.0 (46.4)	10.7 (51.3)	12.7 (54.9)	8.0 (46.4)
Mean daily minimum °C (°F)	7.9 (46.2)	7.3 (45.1)	4.9 (40.8)	1.6 (34.9)	−0.6 (30.9)	−2.3 (27.9)	−3.0 (26.6)	−2.5 (27.5)	−0.2 (31.6)	2.0 (35.6)	4.3 (39.7)	5.8 (42.4)	2.1 (35.8)
Record low °C (°F)	−4.4 (24.1)	−5.2 (22.6)	−6.1 (21.0)	−8.0 (17.6)	−9.5 (14.9)	−12.2 (10.0)	−12.8 (9.0)	−12.4 (9.7)	−9.4 (15.1)	−9.6 (14.7)	−7.1 (19.2)	−6.2 (20.8)	−12.8 (9.0)
Average precipitation mm (inches)	111.8 (4.40)	87.2 (3.43)	111.3 (4.38)	97.6 (3.84)	131.5 (5.18)	171.4 (6.75)	168.8 (6.65)	198.4 (7.81)	205.2 (8.08)	160.9 (6.33)	166.5 (6.56)	127.3 (5.01)	1,708.3 (67.26)
Average precipitation days (≥ 0.2 mm)	11.5	10.9	12.6	13.6	16.1	17.0	18.6	18.8	17.2	15.9	14.6	11.6	178.4
Average afternoon relative humidity (%)	50	54	57	61	67	73	75	69	62	55	56	52	61

=== Thredbo Top Station (AWS) ===
Climate data for Thredbo AWS (1991–2020, extremes 1966–2025); 1,957 m (6,421 ft) AMSL; 36.49° S, 148.29° E
Month	Jan	Feb	Mar	Apr	May	Jun	Jul	Aug	Sep	Oct	Nov	Dec	Year
Record high °C (°F)	27.8 (82.0)	27.0 (80.6)	25.5 (77.9)	24.8 (76.6)	16.2 (61.2)	12.5 (54.5)	9.0 (48.2)	10.5 (50.9)	15.0 (59.0)	19.3 (66.7)	24.0 (75.2)	26.3 (79.3)	27.8 (82.0)
Mean daily maximum °C (°F)	17.2 (63.0)	16.0 (60.8)	13.4 (56.1)	9.5 (49.1)	5.2 (41.4)	1.7 (35.1)	0.3 (32.5)	0.7 (33.3)	3.7 (38.7)	8.0 (46.4)	12.2 (54.0)	14.5 (58.1)	8.5 (47.4)
Daily mean °C (°F)	12.4 (54.3)	11.5 (52.7)	9.1 (48.4)	5.6 (42.1)	2.1 (35.8)	−0.9 (30.4)	−2.2 (28.0)	−2.0 (28.4)	0.7 (33.3)	4.2 (39.6)	7.7 (45.9)	9.9 (49.8)	4.8 (40.7)
Mean daily minimum °C (°F)	7.5 (45.5)	6.9 (44.4)	4.7 (40.5)	1.6 (34.9)	−1.1 (30.0)	−3.5 (25.7)	−4.7 (23.5)	−4.7 (23.5)	−2.4 (27.7)	0.3 (32.5)	3.2 (37.8)	5.2 (41.4)	1.1 (33.9)
Record low °C (°F)	−6.0 (21.2)	−5.2 (22.6)	−6.7 (19.9)	−9.8 (14.4)	−11.0 (12.2)	−12.5 (9.5)	−13.5 (7.7)	−13.3 (8.1)	−13.4 (7.9)	−10.0 (14.0)	−8.5 (16.7)	−9.0 (15.8)	−13.5 (7.7)
Average precipitation mm (inches)	96.0 (3.78)	100.5 (3.96)	118.2 (4.65)	94.7 (3.73)	107.1 (4.22)	98.0 (3.86)	73.3 (2.89)	94.2 (3.71)	114.8 (4.52)	125.8 (4.95)	141.0 (5.55)	112.5 (4.43)	1,274.8 (50.19)
Average precipitation days (≥ 0.2 mm)	10.5	11.0	11.8	11.4	12.4	14.6	14.4	15.1	15.1	13.2	12.8	10.9	153.2
Average afternoon relative humidity (%)	59	62	61	70	75	84	86	84	81	72	65	61	72
Source: Bureau of Meteorology

The Thredbo Top Station (AWS) is significantly colder than the village and includes some of the lowest temperatures recorded in Australia, including a daily maximum of −6.9 °C (19.6 °F) on 9 July 1978. Of mainland Australian sites only the Victorian peak of Mount Hotham is colder by mean maxima, which is lower in elevation but further south-west than Thredbo. On average, the Top Station receives 56.9 snowy days annually, falling in any month of the year.

According to Köppen, Thredbo Top Station would fit the criteria of having a Subpolar oceanic climate (Cfc); one with short, cool summers and long, cold winters. It is bordering on a Subarctic climate (Dfc), as the mean temperature in its coolest month approaches −3 °C (27 °F).

On 3 February 2023, Thredbo Top Station reached a maximum of just 0.1 °C (32.2 °F) — its coldest on record for the height of summer. The coldest maximum temperature for any summer month was −1.0 °C (30.2 °F) on 2 December 2019. Temperature records commenced in 1966 at Thredbo AWS.

== Other sporting activities ==
=== Thredbo Leisure Centre ===
The Thredbo Leisure Centre, opened in 1996, houses a 50 m (160 ft) and 25 m (82 ft) indoor swimming pool, wading pool with a waterslide, an inflatable obstacle course (known as the "Mission Inflatable"), two full-size basketball courts, a gymnasium, squash courts, a physiotherapist and a traverse climbing wall. It has been used by the many high-profile athletes, including the Australian Institute of Sport for high-altitude training in the lead up to the 2008 Olympic Games in Beijing.

=== Mountain biking ===
Since the early 1990s, Thredbo has been popular during the summertime for recreational and competitive mountain biking, attracting serious racers from across Australia and overseas. There are kilometres of cross country singletrack and firetrail around Thredbo Village, the Thredbo golf course, and other trails connecting Thredbo to its neighbouring villages. Two local businesses operate cross-country mountain bike tours from Thredbo and across the Snowy Mountains region.

Thredbo is host to the world-renowned downhill track, the Cannonball Run, which is accessed by taking the Kosciusko Express Quad-Chairlift up to Eagles Nest. From Eagles Nest, the course runs back to the bottom of the chairlift, 600 vertical metres (2,000 ft) below. With approximately 4.2 kilometres (2.6 mi) of fast singletrack, rock gardens, a wall-ride, tight switchbacks and many drops and jumps, the Cannonball Run is one of Australia's longest downhill courses. The Cannonball Run is host to many races through the summer months, including national rounds, state rounds, the National Interschools Mountain Biking Competition. Track engineering has made a significant difference to the sustainability of downhill mountain biking in a sensitive alpine environment.

The Thredbo Mountain Bike Park is currently the only lift-accessed gravity park in Australia. It includes approximately 40 kilometres (25 mi) of gravity-focused trails, as well as several pump tracks and skills parks located in the valley. The park is primarily divided into two parks, accessed by the main Kosciuszko chairlift and a combination of the Gunbarrel chairlift, Merritts Gondala and Cruiser chairlift leaving from the Valley Terminal and Friday Flats. These trails range from beginner flow trails to intermediate and advanced flow and technical trails, and are open from November until May due to inaccessibility during winter months and lift closures. At the far (right) end of the village is the National Parks and Wildlife Service installed Thredbo Valley Track, which follows the course of the Thredbo River from Thredbo Village through Ranger Station, Ngarigo Campgrounds and the Diggings Campgrounds to terminate at Lake Crackenback Resort.

The Thredbo Mountain-cross track, designed by Glen Jacobs, an Australian trail expert, opened in 2005. It is situated on Friday Flat and comprises a start gate, multiple doubles, rollers, berms, moguls, gaps, step-downs and step-ups. The track has hosted numerous races since its opening including national rounds, state rounds and the National Interschools Mountain Biking Competition.

=== Alpine Coaster ===
Opened in the winter of 2024, it is not that far from the village. the Alpine (Roller) Coaster is a 1.5km (0.93 mi) track through the Resort. Available year-round and reaching speeds of up to 40km (24.85 mi).

== Thredbo's Sustainability Initiatives ==
=== Certification ===
Thredbo has achieved EarthCheck Sustainable Destinations Gold certification, aligning with its commitment to environmental responsibility and climate sustainability. This achievement is part of Thredbo's broader strategy to reduce energy consumption and emissions, furthering its environmental conservation efforts.

=== Waste Reduction Efforts ===
The resort is actively working to diminish its waste generation impacts on the Snowy Mountains region. Recognising the limitations and environmental drawbacks of landfill waste, Thredbo has set targets to minimise waste-to-landfill by promoting waste avoidance, reuse, and recycling as viable alternatives.

=== Water Management ===
Thredbo's location within the Australian Alps places it within the catchment areas of significant rivers like the Snowy and Murray Rivers. The resort acknowledges the importance of these water bodies in Australia's freshwater system and is committed to responsible water usage. The Thredbo River, a crucial source for the resort's water supply for drinking, washing, and swimming, is a key focus of their water conservation efforts.

=== Measuring Impact: "Person Year" Metric ===
To effectively measure and manage its waste-to-landfill and water usage, Thredbo employs the "Person Year" metric. This metric accounts for the amount of time an individual spends in Thredbo, allowing for a consistent annual comparison that takes into account the seasonal nature of tourism in the area. This approach is designed to encourage all residents, staff, and visitors of Thredbo to contribute to waste reduction and efficient water use.

== See also ==
- Skiing in Australia
