= ABC South East NSW =

- Australia
- Broadcast area: South Coast and Monaro, New South Wales
- Frequencies: AM: 810 kHz Bega; AM: 1602 kHz Cooma

Programming
- Format: Talk

Ownership
- Owner: Australian Broadcasting Corporation

History
- First air date: 1956

Technical information
- Transmitter coordinates: 36°40′25.89″S 149°50′25.41″E
- Repeaters: FM: 88.9 MHz Thredbo; FM: 94.1 MHz Bombala; FM: 95.5 MHz Jindabyne; FM: 103.5 MHz Batemans Bay; FM: 106.3 MHz Eden

Links
- Website: Official website

ABC South East NSW is an ABC Local Radio station based in Bega. It broadcasts to the southern part of the South Coast and the Monaro regions in New South Wales. This includes the towns of Cooma, Batemans Bay, Moruya and Eden.

The station began as 2BA in 1956 and 2CP in 1966 and is heard on these main AM frequencies along with a number of FM repeaters;

- 103.5 FM Batemans Bay, Moruya
- 106.3 FM Eden
- 94.1 FM Bombala
- 95.5 FM Jindabyne
- 88.9 FM Thredbo

The Batemans Bay, Eden and Bombala translators are known as "2BA/T", whilst those in Jindabyne and Thredbo are known as "2CP/T".

== See also ==
- List of radio stations in Australia
