= Geehi Hut =

Mountain hut in the alpine region of New South Wales, Australia

- Interactive map of the Geehi Hut area

General information
- Coordinates: 36°22′39.02″S 148°10′46.71″E
- Year built: 1952

Geehi Hut, also known as the Nankervis Hut or Airstrip Hut, is an alpine hut located in south-eastern New South Wales, Australia.

== History ==
Ken Nankervis (1925-2012) and his older brother Jim built the hut for grazing and fishing in 1952. Originally at the site there were several buildings including a shed, toilet, laundry and the main house. However, the shed and laundry have been removed. Geehi Hut is often named Nankervis Hut after the brothers.

In 2004, the hut was rebuilt by the Kosciusko Huts Association, with assistance from the New South Wales National Parks and Wildlife Service, day-labourers, and the caretakers, the Land Rover Club of New South Wales and the Range Rover Club of Sydney. It was officially re-opened on Sunday 3 October 2004, with members of the Nankervis family in attendance.

== Description ==
Geehi Hut is constructed from river rocks, with the floor a mix of concrete and dirt. Around 11 m (36 ft) by 9 m (30 ft), in includes three rooms. Construction of this type is fairly unusual for Australian Alpine huts, making Geehi hut a popular destination for camping and walking groups. The ablution facilities are in the nearby campground.

The Geehi Hut area provides an excellent base to climb the historic and iconic Hannel's Spur Track up to the summit of Mount Kosciuszko. The trailhead is located about 1.4 km (0.87 mi) SSW of the Alpine Way, at the Geehi Flats Rest area. This challenging route is the overlooked third route to the summit of Australia's highest mountain.

== Access and facilities ==
Access is by car (ordinary sedan) or by foot.

Near the hut there is a large area for camping with plenty of shade next to Geehi River. Toilet and barbecue facilities are at the camp sites and disabled access walking paths are along the river. There are picnic tables. There is fishing access to the river
