= Berridale =

- Town
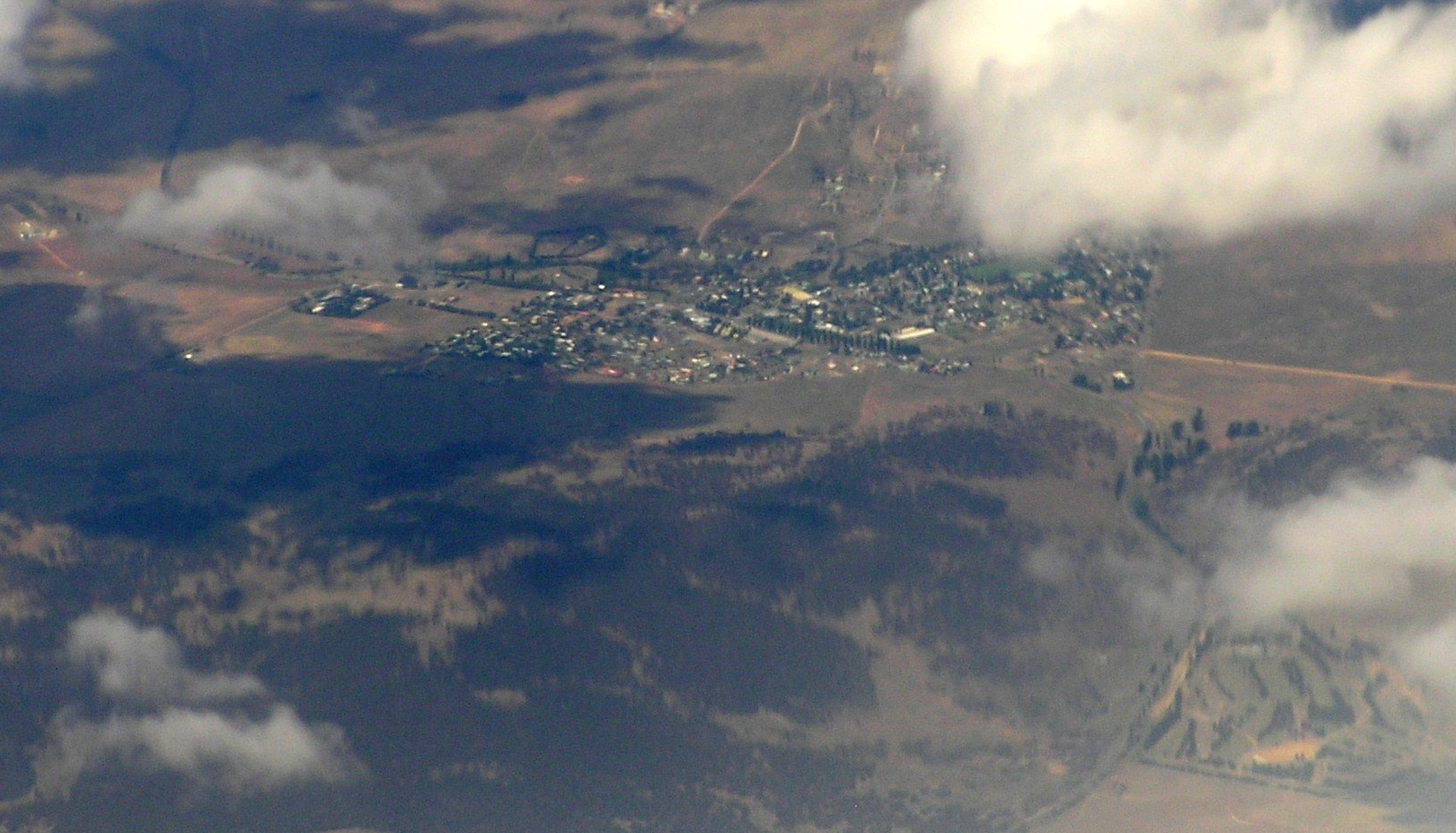
- aerial view from north west

- Coordinates: 36°21′24″S 148°49′22″E
- Country: Australia
- State: New South Wales
- LGA: Snowy Monaro Regional Council
- Location: 435 km (270 mi) from Sydney
- Established: 1863

Government
  - State electorate: Monaro
  - Federal division: Eden-Monaro
- Elevation: 860 m (2,820 ft)

Population
  - Total: 1,300 (2021 census)
- Postcode: 2628
- Mean max temp: 18.1 °C (64.6 °F)
- Mean min temp: 4.0 °C (39.2 °F)
- Annual rainfall: 539.5 mm (21.24 in)

Berridale is a small town in New South Wales. At the 2021 census it had a population of 1,300. It was the administrative centre of the Snowy River Shire until in 2016 that shire merged with two others to form the Snowy Monaro Regional Council, one of Australia's major inland tourist destinations. Berridale lies at 860 metres above sea level between the towns of Cooma and Jindabyne and 435 kilometres south of Sydney.

== History ==
Aboriginals long occupied the area but in small numbers. [need proof] The European settlement was founded in the 1860s, when Scotsman William Oliver built his house there in 1863 and opened a roadside store, naming the location as a variation on his home town in Scotland, Berriedale. The dry climate later proved the town ideal for growing fine merino wool. Oliver's store became a wayside inn in 1870, which still exists as the Berridale Inn, and a granite store was built. A post office opened in the town in 1869 with a telegraph office opening in 1870.

The town nicknamed itself the 'Crossroads of the Snowy' during the period when gold miners would pass through on their way to the Adaminaby and Kiandra goldfields. Berridale was also nicknamed the 'Town of the Poplars' in the 1990s due to the main road through it from Cooma to Jindabyne (Jindabyne Road/Kosciusko Road ) being lined by an avenue of poplars. The town grew slowly with the pastoral industry forming the mainstay of the local economy. The town hosted a work camp for the Snowy Mountains Authority although its population did not grow as much as Jindabyne or Cooma during the Snowy Mountains Scheme. Berridale is also home to one of the largest collections of heavy machinery and associated equipment salvaged from construction of the Snowy Mountains Scheme. The items include dozers, graders, scrapers, dumpers, loaders, tournapulls, trucks, snow equipment and numerous other pieces, from well known makers such as Allis-Chalmers, Caterpillar, International, Euclid, LeTourneau Technologies, Leyland, Thornycroft and others and numbers in excess of 100 pieces. A museum is planned for future construction to display the items.

In recent decades, Berridale has developed a tourism industry based on its location en route to the NSW snow fields. John Howard was staying in Berridale in September 1985 on a family ski holiday when Andrew Peacock announced that he would call a party room meeting to replace him as Deputy Leader of the Liberal Party. When Howard was re-elected as Deputy Leader on 5 September, Peacock was in an untenable position and resigned with Howard becoming Leader of the Liberal Party and the Leader of the Opposition.

== Climate and geography ==
Berridale features an oceanic climate (Cfb); climate data sourced from nearby Cooma-Snowy Mountains Airport at similar elevation and position to Berridale itself. Snowfall is common, but generally light and often melts quickly due to the westerly foehn winds. Berridale's climate is relatively dry as the town is located in a rainshadow on the Monaro, sandwiched between the Snowy Mountains and the coastal ranges.

The land surrounding the town is a combination of cleared farmland and lightly wooded bush. There are granite boulders located south through west of the town on the roads to both Jindabyne and Dalgety. This granite was crystallised as a large mass from magma 400 million years ago miles from the Earth's surface and was gradually eroded and uplifted to its current position. The hills immediately to the north of the town have less granite. There are, however, a few small areas of shale.

Climate data for Cooma Airport AWS (1991–2022); 930 m AMSL; 36.29° S, 148.97° E
Month	Jan	Feb	Mar	Apr	May	Jun	Jul	Aug	Sep	Oct	Nov	Dec	Year
Record high °C (°F)	39.1 (102.4)	38.0 (100.4)	36.0 (96.8)	30.0 (86.0)	23.8 (74.8)	21.9 (71.4)	19.7 (67.5)	25.4 (77.7)	27.7 (81.9)	29.3 (84.7)	35.9 (96.6)	37.7 (99.9)	39.1 (102.4)
Mean daily maximum °C (°F)	26.6 (79.9)	24.9 (76.8)	22.2 (72.0)	18.2 (64.8)	14.1 (57.4)	10.7 (51.3)	10.2 (50.4)	11.9 (53.4)	15.1 (59.2)	18.2 (64.8)	21.2 (70.2)	24.1 (75.4)	18.1 (64.6)
Mean daily minimum °C (°F)	10.9 (51.6)	10.2 (50.4)	7.8 (46.0)	3.9 (39.0)	0.6 (33.1)	−1.1 (30.0)	−2.0 (28.4)	−1.5 (29.3)	1.1 (34.0)	3.5 (38.3)	6.5 (43.7)	8.6 (47.5)	4.0 (39.3)
Record low °C (°F)	−2.2 (28.0)	−1.2 (29.8)	−2.7 (27.1)	−8.4 (16.9)	−9.7 (14.5)	−11.0 (12.2)	−10.8 (12.6)	−11.0 (12.2)	−9.4 (15.1)	−9.2 (15.4)	−5.6 (21.9)	−3.5 (25.7)	−11.0 (12.2)
Average precipitation mm (inches)	53.9 (2.12)	51.4 (2.02)	50.6 (1.99)	39.4 (1.55)	29.1 (1.15)	39.9 (1.57)	29.5 (1.16)	32.2 (1.27)	37.7 (1.48)	47.2 (1.86)	69.0 (2.72)	54.3 (2.14)	539.5 (21.24)
Average precipitation days (≥ 0.2 mm)	8.9	9.4	10.5	10.5	11.2	12.4	12.1	10.7	11.0	11.4	11.8	9.8	129.7
Average afternoon relative humidity (%)	39	43	43	46	54	60	57	48	46	43	43	39	47
Average dew point °C (°F)	7.0 (44.6)	8.1 (46.6)	6.3 (43.3)	4.0 (39.2)	3.1 (37.6)	1.6 (34.9)	0.2 (32.4)	−0.8 (30.6)	0.7 (33.3)	2.1 (35.8)	4.2 (39.6)	5.2 (41.4)	3.5 (38.3)
Source: Bureau of Meteorology; Cooma Airport AWS

== Population ==
In the 2021 Census, there were 1,300 people in Berridale. 82.4% were born in Australia and 89.3% only spoke English at home. The most common responses for religion were No Religion 44.0%, Catholic 17.9% and Anglican 16.6%.

== Education ==
Berridale Public School is a primary school with around 100 pupils, serving the town and the outlying areas, with pupils going on to the Snowy Mountains Grammar School or Jindabyne Central School in Jindabyne or Monaro High School in Cooma.

== Local attractions ==
Berridale Inn is a tourist hot spot when traveling through to the snow during season.

With its moonlike landscape, Berridale is a haven for photographers during each season. Many photographers utilise the granite boulders for shots whilst many will also take advantage of the Poplar trees that line the highway when they change from bright green to a luminous yellow during autumn.

During the year the Lions Club hold Easter and Spring markets which draw a large crowd to the township. The Berridale Chamber of Commerce also holds a Christmas Twilight Market which proves to be very popular.

The Heritage Walk is also popular with tourists and residents. The walk features many of the older parts of the town.

Berridale also plays host to being a checkpoint during The Snowy Ride. The Snowy Ride is a motorcycle event run annually in the Alpine Region of NSW with the aim of involving motorcycle riders from all over Australia to raise money for Childhood Cancer Research.

During winter, Berridale's population swells as skiers and seasonal workers converge on the town as they make it their base for the winter ski season.

== Sport ==
Berridale has tennis court facilities, four of which are all weather and two clay and are used weekly during the warmer months.

Berridale also competes in the Monaro and District Cricket Association fielding one side in the competition and have won several competitions in the past.

The Berridale swimming pool is open from November until March.

Golf is played at the Coolamatong Golf Club which is located around 2 km from the CBD. The course is 18 holes and features grass greens and is also used for the Diggers Golf Day held in May each year. The club house is located in the CBD.

Berridale is also used as a training base for cyclists from all over Australia who use the many roads to train on as well as taking advantage of the high altitude.

== Media ==
Radio stations that broadcast to the town are ABC South East NSW, Snow FM, 2XL and Monaro FM.

Berriadle receives five free-to-air television networks including all the digital free-to-air channels relayed from Canberra, and broadcast from Jindabyne Hill.

Networks available include ABC, SBS, Seven, WIN, and Network 10.

Snowy Mountains Television is also broadcast from nearby Jindabyne, and operates in addition to the other broadcasters under an open narrowcasting licence.

== World War II aircraft crash ==
On 28 March 1942, a USAAF P-40E fighter made an emergency landing at "Wheat Hill" station, after becoming lost in fog during a flight from Canberra. The pilot, Lt Chester Namola stayed overnight with the headmaster of the local public school.
