= Lake Jindabyne =

Man-made dammed reservoir in the Snowy Mountains, Australia

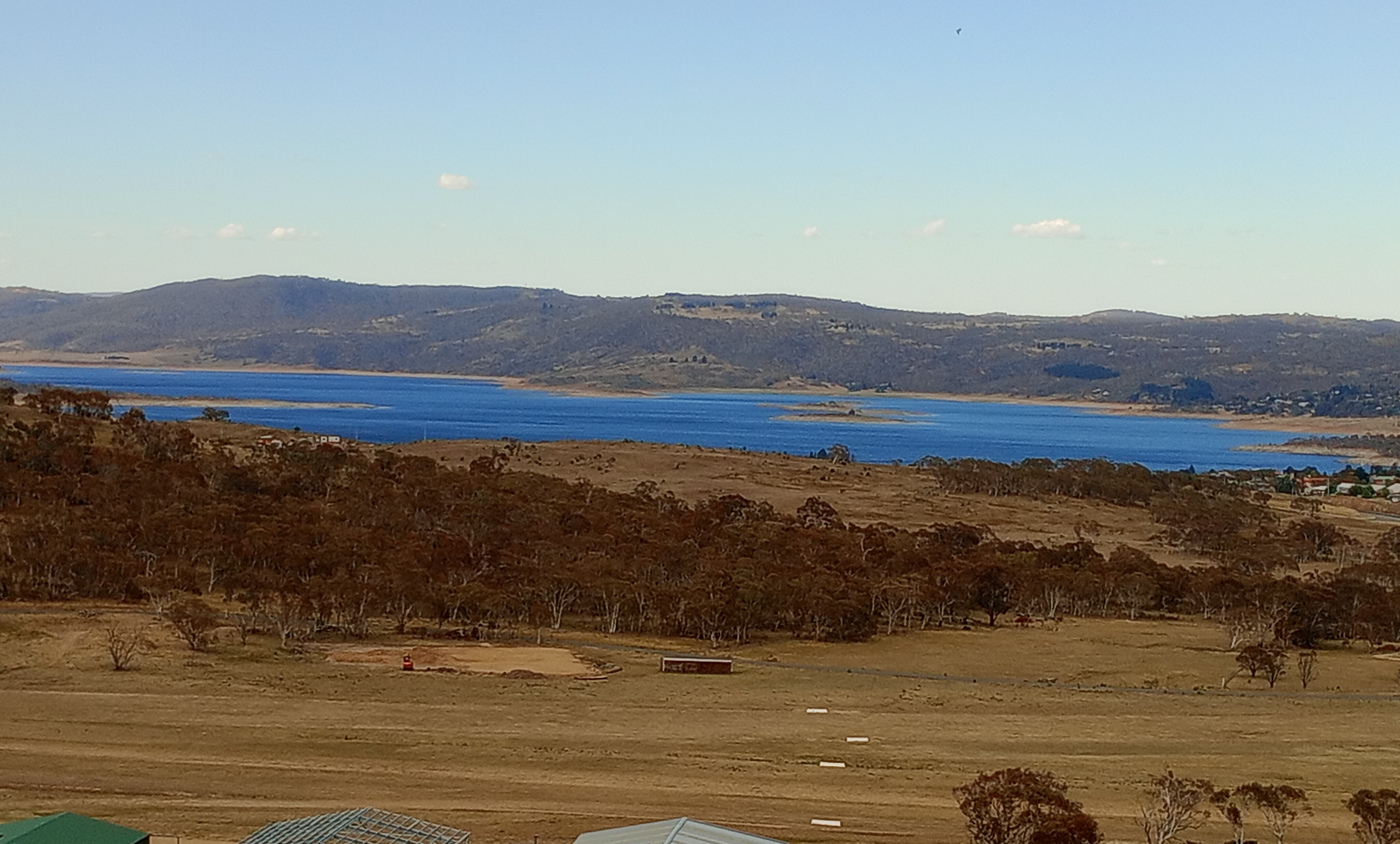
- Lake Jindabyne, December 2024

- Location within Australia Location within New South Wales
- Coordinates: 36°23′S 148°38′E
- Type: Man-made dammed reservoir
- Primary inflows: Snowy River; Eucumbene River; Thredbo River
- Primary outflows: Snowy River
- Catchment area: 1,880 km^{2} (730 sq mi)
- Basin countries: Australia
- Managing agency: Snowy Hydro
- First flooded: 1967
- Max. depth: 40 metres (130 ft)
- Surface elevation: 930 m (3,050 ft)
- Frozen: Sometimes during winter
- Settlements: Jindabyne

Lake Jindabyne is a man-made reservoir in the south-east Snowy Mountains region of New South Wales, Australia. Created by Jindabyne Dam, it serves for the Snowy Mountains Scheme, acting as a reservoir to redirect waters from the Snowy River to the Murray River, for hydro-power generation and irrigation, as well as a water supply. Jindabyne Dam is located approximately 140 kilometres (87 mi) southwest of Canberra, the nation's capital.

Lake Jindabyne receives the flow from the Snowy River as well as its tributaries, the Thredbo River and Eucumbene River. Smaller inflows include Cobbin Creek, Rushes Creek and Wollondibby Creek. The flow of water into Lake Jindabyne is particularly strong during the spring months of October and November due to snow melt.

== Pre-lake history ==
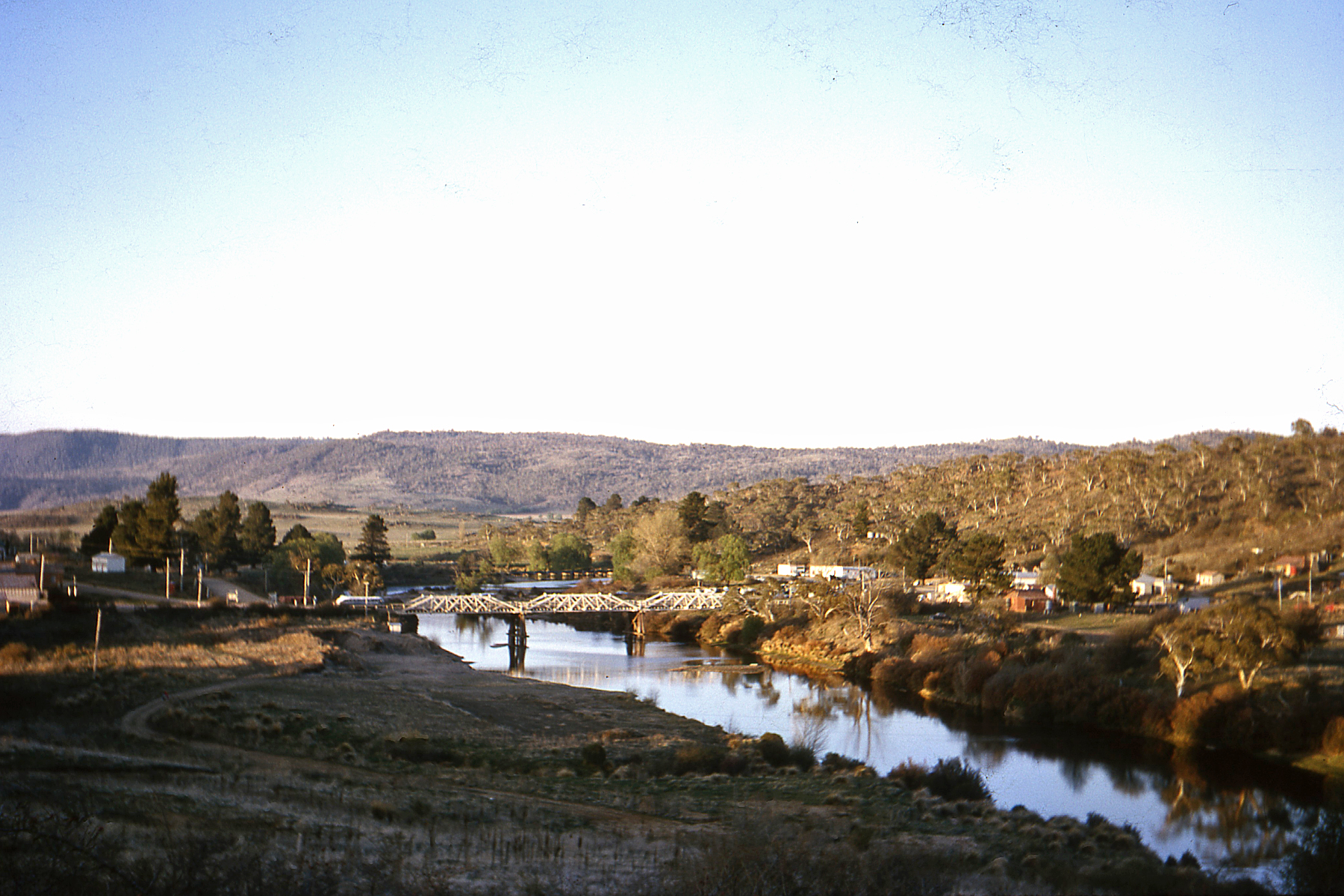
Old Jindabyne, 1965

In the years before European colonisation, the site was once inhabited by the Ngarigo Aboriginal People. In the 1840s, white people came along and settled in the original town of Jindabyne, Old Jindabyne (now underwater). The town was situated on the banks of the Snowy River, and was used as a main river crossing for cattle travelling between the Monaro and Gippsland. Previously, the site where Lake Jindabyne was a broad grassy valley. In 1860 a gold rush at nearby Crackenback led to the old Jindabyne Hotel being founded. In 1959, the 250 residents at Old Jindabyne prepared for relocation of their settlements to the present-day Jindabyne. Once the residents were successfully relocated, a demolition squad blew up the bridge before the basin was flooded. Flooding completed in 1967.

== Capacity ==
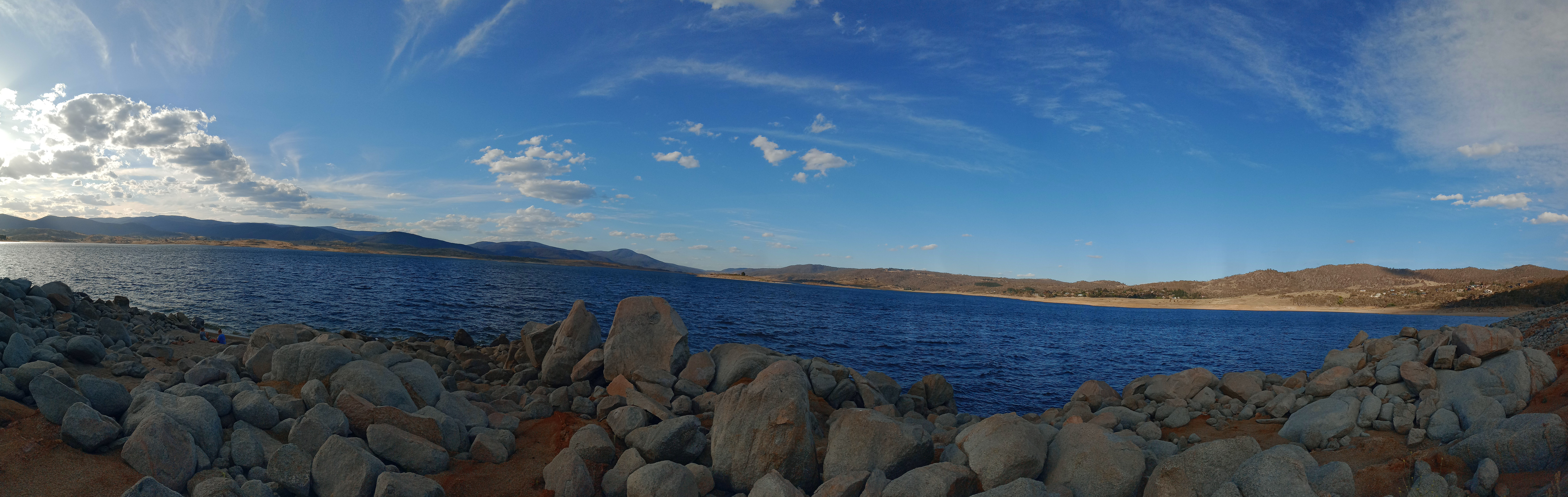
Lake Jindabyne, viewed from Rainbow Reserve

The total capacity of Lake Jindabyne is 688,287 megalitres (1.51402×10^{11} imp gal; 1.81826×10^{11} US gal), but can get as low as 364,792 megalitres (8.0243×10^{10} imp gal; 9.6368×10^{10} US gal), due to reduced snow melt.

== Uses ==
Lake Jindabyne, apart from being used as a water redirect, is also used as a potable water supply reservoir. It supplies potable drinking water to Jindabyne, as well as the nearby towns of Berridale, East Jindabyne, Tyrolean, and Kalkite. Most get treated with fluoride and chlorine, before getting pumped to other minor reservoirs and get fed to reticulation by gravity.

== Damming ==
Most of the water from the lake is redirected to the Murray River, as the Jindabyne pumping station pumps the water from the lake into the Jindabyne-Island Bend tunnel. The water then goes to Geehi Dam via the Snowy-Geehi tunnel and is then available to the Murray Hydroelectric Power Station before entering the Murray River.

The damming and redirection of the Snowy River reduced its flow below the dam to about only 1% of the amount that flowed before the river was dammed. This caused environmental concerns about the state of the lower reaches of the Snowy River in Victoria and NSW. The result was Snowy Hydro releasing water as environmental flows. In 2000, the NSW and Victorian Governments reached a long-term agreement to increase the flow of water into the Snowy to 28%.

== Recreational uses ==
Lake Jindabyne is a sailing and fishing destination. The body of water is one of the largest fresh water reservoirs in New South Wales, and has a resident population of Atlantic salmon, brook trout and rainbow trout. Lake Jindabyne also has a reputation as one of the best places to catch trout in Australia.

In 1969, the Eucumbene Sailing Club moved to Lake Jindabyne and formed the Lake Jindabyne Yacht Club as conditions were not as rough as Lake Eucumbene. The club operates from November until April every year with racing in nineteen different classes of boat.

== See also ==
- Lake Eucumbene – Similar lake to the north of Lake Jindabyne
- Snowy River – Main inflow to Lake Jindabyne
