= Snowy Mountains Television =

- Available in: English
- Website: www.snowymountains.tv
- Launched: 1992; 34 years ago

Snowy Mountains Television is an Australian community television station based in Jindabyne, New South Wales.

The station began broadcasting in 1992 as SMTV Channel 5, servicing residents of the Snowy Mountains region under an open narrowcast license.

Since 2019, SMTV broadcasts digitally on Channel 350 while live-streaming from their website.

Programming consists of skiing and snow sport events from around the world, and promotions of local businesses from within the Snowy Mountains region.
