= Little Thredbo River =

Coordinates: 36°29′S 148°26′E

Little Thredbo River Little Thredbo Creek
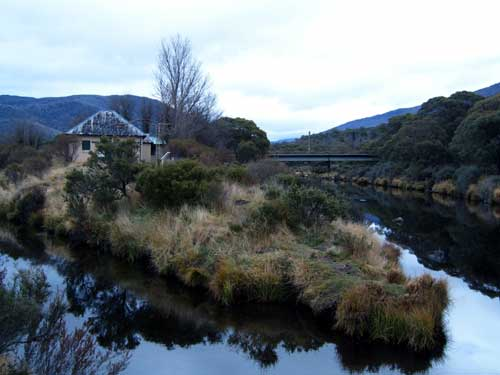
- Confluence of the Little Thredbo River (left) with the Thredbo River (right), at Bullocks Flat.

Location
- Country: Australia
- State: New South Wales
- Region: Australian Alps (IBRA), Snowy Mountains
- Local government area: Snowy Monaro Regional Council

Physical characteristics
- Source: Moonbah Mountain, Snowy Mountains
  - location: near Camp Flat
  - elevation: 1,710 m (5,610 ft)
- Mouth: confluence with the Thredbo River
  - location: near the Bullocks Flat Terminal
  - elevation: 1,130 m (3,710 ft)
- Length: 14 km (8.7 mi)

Basin features
- River system: Snowy River catchment
- National park: Kosciuszko NP

The Little Thredbo River, a perennial river of the Snowy River catchment, is located in the Snowy Mountains region of New South Wales, Australia.

== Course and features ==
The Little Thredbo River rises below Moonbah Mountain, within the Kosciuszko National Park near Camp Flat, and flows generally northeast by north before reaching its confluence with the Thredbo River, near the Bullocks Flat Terminal. The river descends 582 metres (1,909 ft) over its 14 kilometres (8.7 mi) course.

== See also ==
- List of rivers of New South Wales (L–Z)
- List of rivers of Australia
- Rivers of New South Wales
