= Jindabyne Dam =

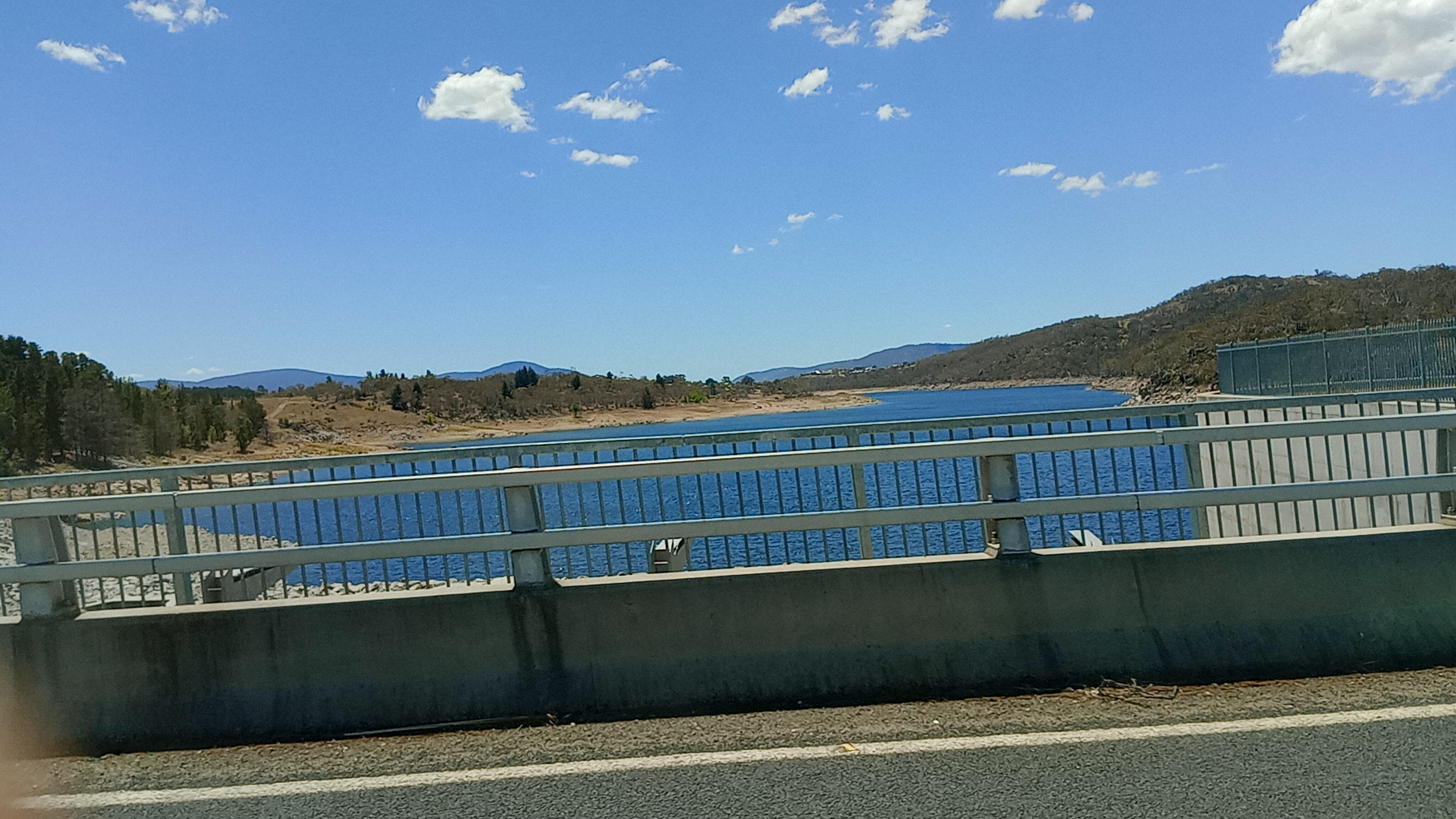
- View from the top of Jindabyne Dam

- Location of Jindabyne Dam in New South Wales
- Country: Australia
- Location: Snowy Mountains, New South Wales
- Coordinates: 36°26′S 148°38′E
- Status: Operational
- Opening date: 1967
- Owner: Snowy Hydro

Dam and spillways
- Type of dam: Rock-fill dam
- Impounds: Snowy River
- Height: 72 metres (236 ft)
- Length: 335 metres (1,099 ft)
- Dam volume: 894,000 cubic metres (31,600,000 cu ft)
- Spillways: 1
- Spillway capacity: 3,002 cubic metres per second (106,000 cu ft/s)

Reservoir
- Creates: Lake Jindabyne
- Total capacity: 688,287 megalitres (24,306.6×10^{6} cu ft)
- Catchment area: 1,880 square kilometres (730 sq mi)
- Surface area: 3,033.5 hectares (7,496 acres)
- Maximum water depth: 40 metres (130 ft)

Jindabyne Dam is a major ungated rockfill embankment dam across the Snowy River in the Snowy Mountains of New South Wales, Australia. The dam's main purpose is to redirect water from the Snowy River to the Murray, for the generation of hydro-power and irrigation. It is one of the sixteen major dams that comprise the Snowy Mountains Scheme, a vast hydroelectricity and irrigation complex constructed in south-east Australia between 1949 and 1974 and now run by Snowy Hydro.

== Location and features ==
Completed in 1967, Jindabyne Dam is a major dam, located approximately 2 kilometres (1.2 mi) south south-east of the relocated town of Jindabyne. The dam was constructed by a consortium of Utah-Brown and Sudamericana based on engineering plans developed under contract by the Snowy Mountains Hydroelectric Authority. Construction of the dam flooded the settlement of Old Jindabyne that accommodated approximately 300 people. Parts of Old Jindabyne can be seen when the levels of Lake Jindabyne are low. The settlement of East Jindabyne is located above what was Old Jindabyne.

The dam wall comprising 894,000 cubic metres (31,600,000 cu ft) of rockfill is 72 metres (236 ft) high and 335 metres (1,099 ft) long. At full capacity, the dam wall holds back 688,227 megalitres (24,304.5×10^{6} cu ft) of water. The surface area of Lake Jindabyne is 3,033.5 hectares (7,496 acres) and the catchment area is 1,880 square kilometres (730 sq mi). The spillway is capable of discharging 3,002 cubic metres per second (106,000 cu ft/s).

Work to modify the dam spillway commenced in 1994 and was ongoing as of July 2009.

The dam has a 1.1MW hydropower generator that can be used during environmental releases into the Snowy River.

== Gallery ==
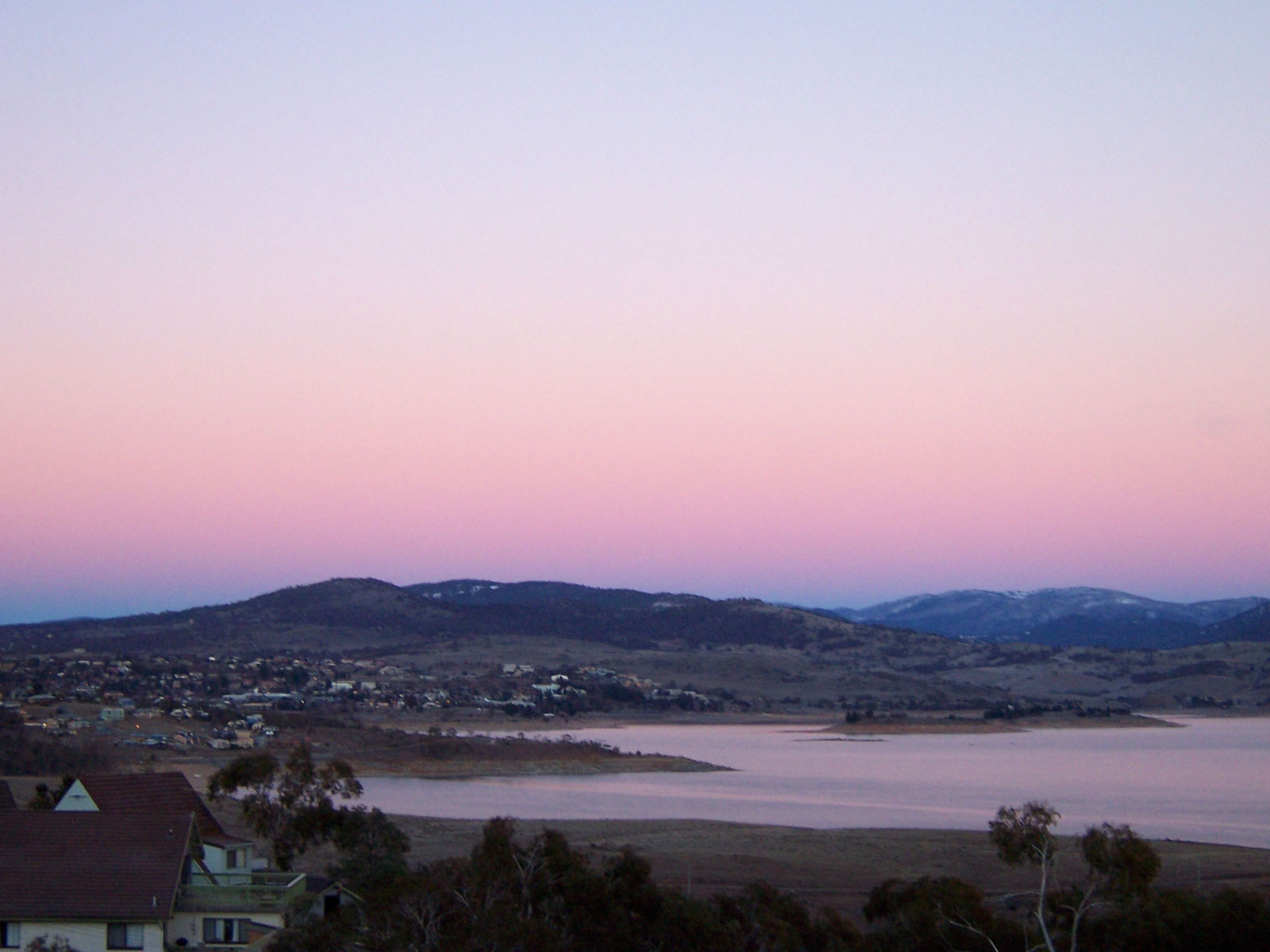
Jindabyne, as viewed from across Lake Jindabyne.

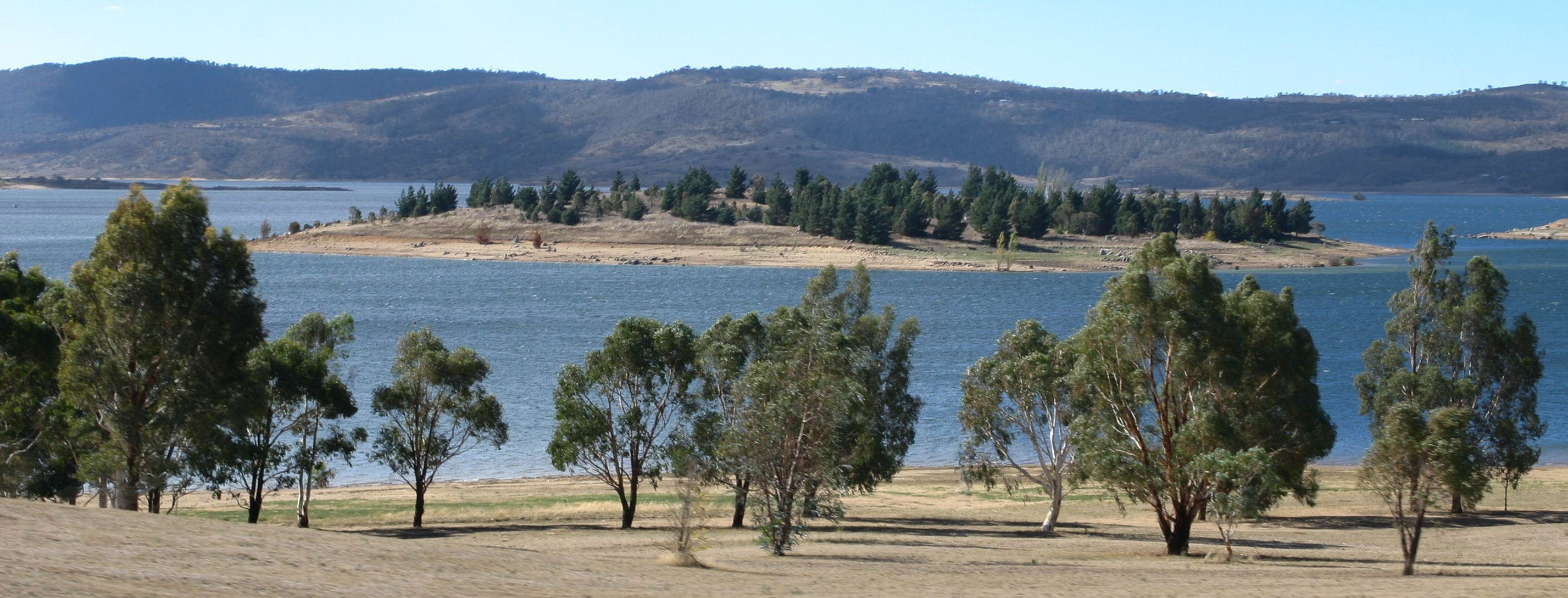
Lake Jindabyne 2004

== See also ==
- Kosciuszko National Park
- List of dams and reservoirs in New South Wales
- Snowy Scheme Museum
