= Jindabyne =

- Town
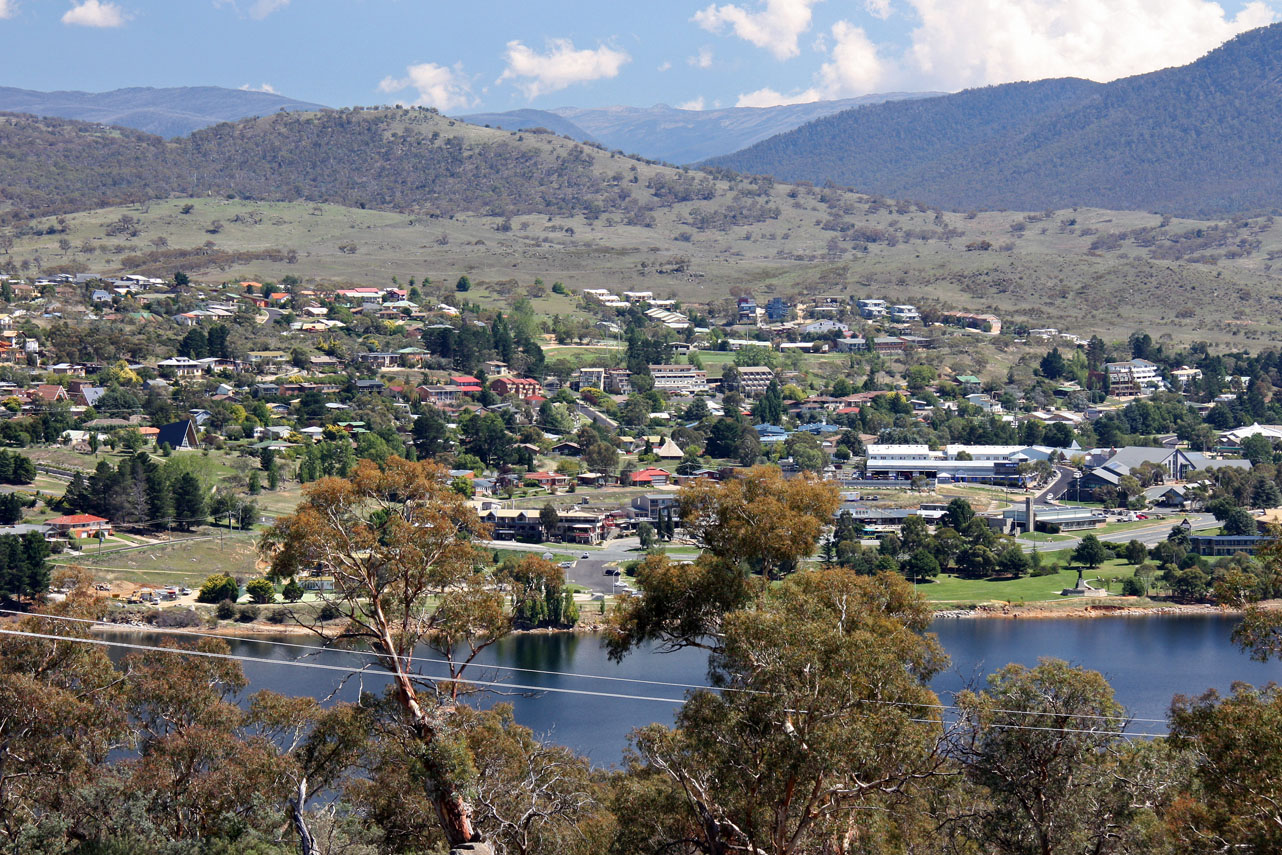
- Jindabyne, as viewed from across Lake Jindabyne

- Coordinates: 36°24′0″S 148°37′0″E
- Country: Australia
- State: New South Wales
- LGA: Snowy Monaro Regional Council
- Location: 511 km (318 mi) SW of Sydney; 180 km (110 mi) SSW of Canberra; 61 km (38 mi) WSW of Cooma; 156 km (97 mi) W of Bega; 248 km (154 mi) NNE of Bairnsdale

Government
  - State electorate: Monaro
  - Federal division: Eden-Monaro
- Elevation: 915 m (3,002 ft)

Population
  - Total: 2,986 (2021 census)
- Time zone: UTC+10 (AEST)
  - Summer (DST): UTC+11 (AEDT)
- Postcode: 2627
- Mean max temp: 18.1 °C (64.6 °F)
- Mean min temp: 4.0 °C (39.2 °F)
- Annual rainfall: 539.5 mm (21.24 in)

Jindabyne (/ˈdʒɪndəbaɪn/) is a town in south-east New South Wales, Australia that overlooks Lake Jindabyne near the Snowy Mountains, in Snowy Monaro Regional Council. It is a popular holiday destination year round, especially in winter. This is due to its proximity to major ski resort developments within the Kosciuszko National Park, including Thredbo, Perisher and Charlotte Pass.

Originally situated on land that is now under Lake Jindabyne, the township was transferred to its present location in the 1960s due to the construction of Jindabyne Dam, on the Snowy River, as part of the Snowy Mountains Scheme. At the 2021 census, Jindabyne had a population of 2,986. The town's name is derived from an Aboriginal word meaning "valley".

Jindabyne is one of the highest settlements of its size in Australia, at 918 metres above sea level. Snowfalls regularly occur during winter. Jindabyne is connected to the surrounding area by Kosciuszko Road East to Cooma then North to Canberra, the Alpine Way West to the Riverina and Wodonga and the Barry Way to the South and Gippsland.

== History ==
Originally situated on a site that is now under the waters of Lake Jindabyne, the township was relocated to its present position in the 1960s before the damming of the Snowy River as part of the Snowy Mountains Scheme. The Scheme was developed from the 1940s as a way of increasing the flow of inland rivers in order to encourage the development of primary industries based on irrigation, and to create hydroelectricity.

Completed in 1967, Jindabyne Dam is a major dam, located approximately 2 kilometres (1.2 mi) south south-east of the relocated township. Parts of Old Jindabyne can be seen when the levels of Lake Jindabyne are low particularly the foundations of the old St Columbkille Roman Catholic Church. The settlement of East Jindabyne is located above what was Old Jindabyne. The dam's main purpose is for the generation of hydropower and is one of the sixteen major dams that comprise the Snowy Mountains Scheme, a vast hydroelectricity and irrigation complex constructed in south-east Australia between 1949 and 1974 and now run by Snowy Hydro.

Jindabyne celebrated the new town's 50th anniversary on 19 December 2014 with a long lunch, parade through the town centre, and speech by Peter Hendy MP. The celebrations were attended by General David Hurley, Governor of New South Wales, Member for Monaro, Mr John Barilaro, Mayor of Snowy River Shire, Mr John Cahill.

== Skiing and tourism ==
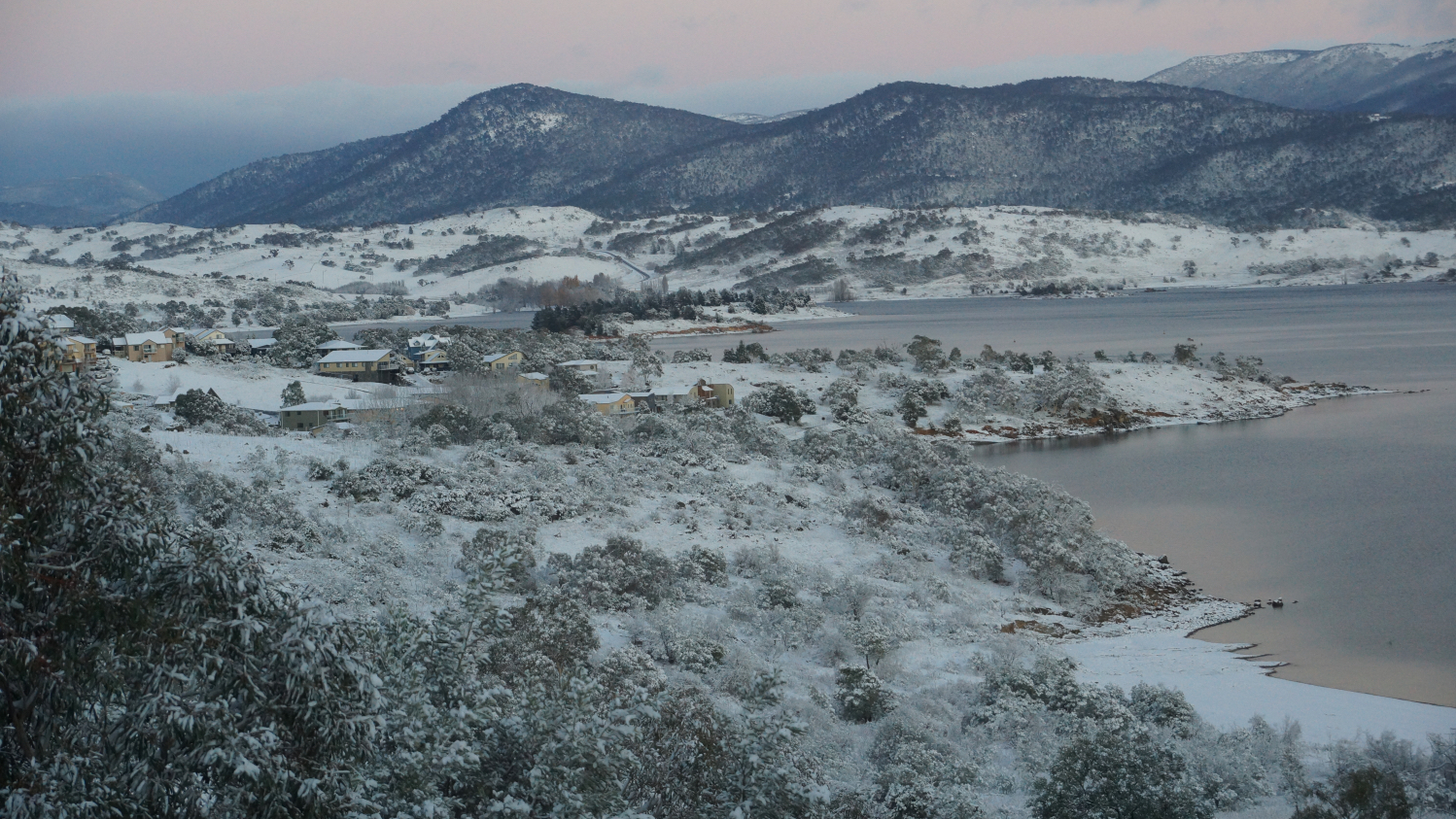
Lake Jindabyne and surrounds after snowfall

Jindabyne is a service town for Australia's highest ski resorts: Perisher, Thredbo and Charlotte Pass. Thredbo and Perisher are approximately 30 minutes' drive into the Kosciuszko National Park, although require the payment of park entry fees (AU$29 per vehicle per day) and the compulsory carrying of snow chains in winter for cars without 4WD. However, Jindabyne also attracts tourists in summer with Lake Jindabyne popular for activities such as fishing, water skiing and wakeboarding. Since the late 2000s mountain biking has become a popular summer activity and as of 2016, is assisting in turning the Snowy Mountains into a year-round adventure-tourist destination.

The town is heavily tourist-oriented with a large range of snow-sport rental outlets and accommodation facilities. Prices can be heavily increased during the peak winter season, although they generally remain lower than those of outlets within the national park and ski resorts.

Lake Jindabyne is a sailing, walking and fishing destination. The body of water is one of the largest fresh water reservoirs in New South Wales, and has a resident population of Atlantic Salmon, Brook Trout, Brown Trout and Rainbow Trout. Lake Jindabyne also has a reputation as one of the best places to catch trout in Australia. The Gaden Trout Hatchery, located about 10 kilometres north-west of Jindabyne, on the route leading to Perisher Ski Resort, holds tours of the hatchery's trout ponds, and is one of Australia's main centres involved in the breeding and rearing of cold water sport fish.

Access to information regarding current tourist activities, business listings can be found using the area's free mobile app, the "Jindy Guide".

Every year during the Easter holidays, the Lake Light Sculpture exhibition is hosted on Lake Jindabyne. The Lake has many sculptures on display including the Count Paul Strzelecki in the Banjo Paterson Park and an Irish harp.

== Population ==
In the 2021 census, there were 2,986 people in Jindabyne. 80.5% of people were born in Australia. The next most common countries of birth were England 3.5%, and New Zealand 1.8%. 88.6% of people spoke only English at home. The most common responses for religion were No Religion 58.4%, Catholic 14.4%, and Anglican 11.0%.

== Climate ==
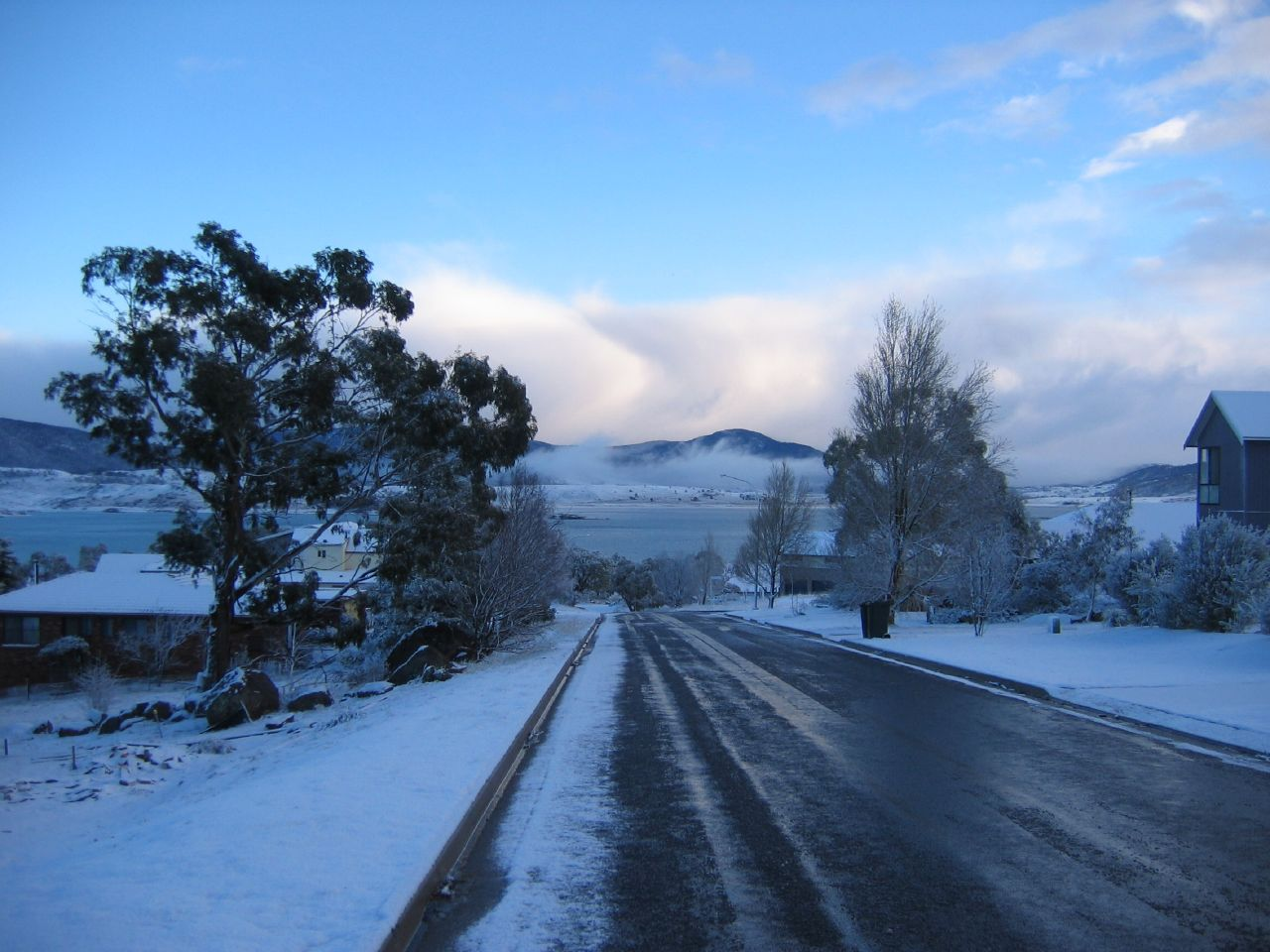
Jindabyne in winter

Jindabyne has an oceanic climate (Cfb). Diurnal range is high across the year owing to its sheltered valley location. Rainfall is low, with a slight peak in spring–summer and a notable drop in winter. Snowfalls are common in the region through winter and spring, but are generally light owing to its position on the leeward side of the ranges. In mid-July in 2004 and 2005, snow fell up to half a metre or 2 ft following freak snowfalls over a large area of New South Wales.

Climate data for Cooma Airport AWS (1991–2022); 930 m AMSL; 36.29° S, 148.97° E
Month	Jan	Feb	Mar	Apr	May	Jun	Jul	Aug	Sep	Oct	Nov	Dec	Year
Record high °C (°F)	39.1 (102.4)	38.0 (100.4)	36.0 (96.8)	30.0 (86.0)	23.8 (74.8)	21.9 (71.4)	19.7 (67.5)	25.4 (77.7)	27.7 (81.9)	29.3 (84.7)	35.9 (96.6)	37.7 (99.9)	39.1 (102.4)
Mean daily maximum °C (°F)	26.6 (79.9)	24.9 (76.8)	22.2 (72.0)	18.2 (64.8)	14.1 (57.4)	10.7 (51.3)	10.2 (50.4)	11.9 (53.4)	15.1 (59.2)	18.2 (64.8)	21.2 (70.2)	24.1 (75.4)	18.1 (64.6)
Mean daily minimum °C (°F)	10.9 (51.6)	10.2 (50.4)	7.8 (46.0)	3.9 (39.0)	0.6 (33.1)	−1.1 (30.0)	−2.0 (28.4)	−1.5 (29.3)	1.1 (34.0)	3.5 (38.3)	6.5 (43.7)	8.6 (47.5)	4.0 (39.3)
Record low °C (°F)	−2.2 (28.0)	−1.2 (29.8)	−2.7 (27.1)	−8.4 (16.9)	−9.7 (14.5)	−11.0 (12.2)	−10.8 (12.6)	−11.0 (12.2)	−9.4 (15.1)	−9.2 (15.4)	−5.6 (21.9)	−3.5 (25.7)	−11.0 (12.2)
Average precipitation mm (inches)	53.9 (2.12)	51.4 (2.02)	50.6 (1.99)	39.4 (1.55)	29.1 (1.15)	39.9 (1.57)	29.5 (1.16)	32.2 (1.27)	37.7 (1.48)	47.2 (1.86)	69.0 (2.72)	54.3 (2.14)	539.5 (21.24)
Average precipitation days (≥ 0.2 mm)	8.9	9.4	10.5	10.5	11.2	12.4	12.1	10.7	11.0	11.4	11.8	9.8	129.7
Average afternoon relative humidity (%)	39	43	43	46	54	60	57	48	46	43	43	39	47
Average dew point °C (°F)	7.0 (44.6)	8.1 (46.6)	6.3 (43.3)	4.0 (39.2)	3.1 (37.6)	1.6 (34.9)	0.2 (32.4)	−0.8 (30.6)	0.7 (33.3)	2.1 (35.8)	4.2 (39.6)	5.2 (41.4)	3.5 (38.3)
Source: Australian Bureau of Meteorology; Cooma Airport AWS

== Education ==
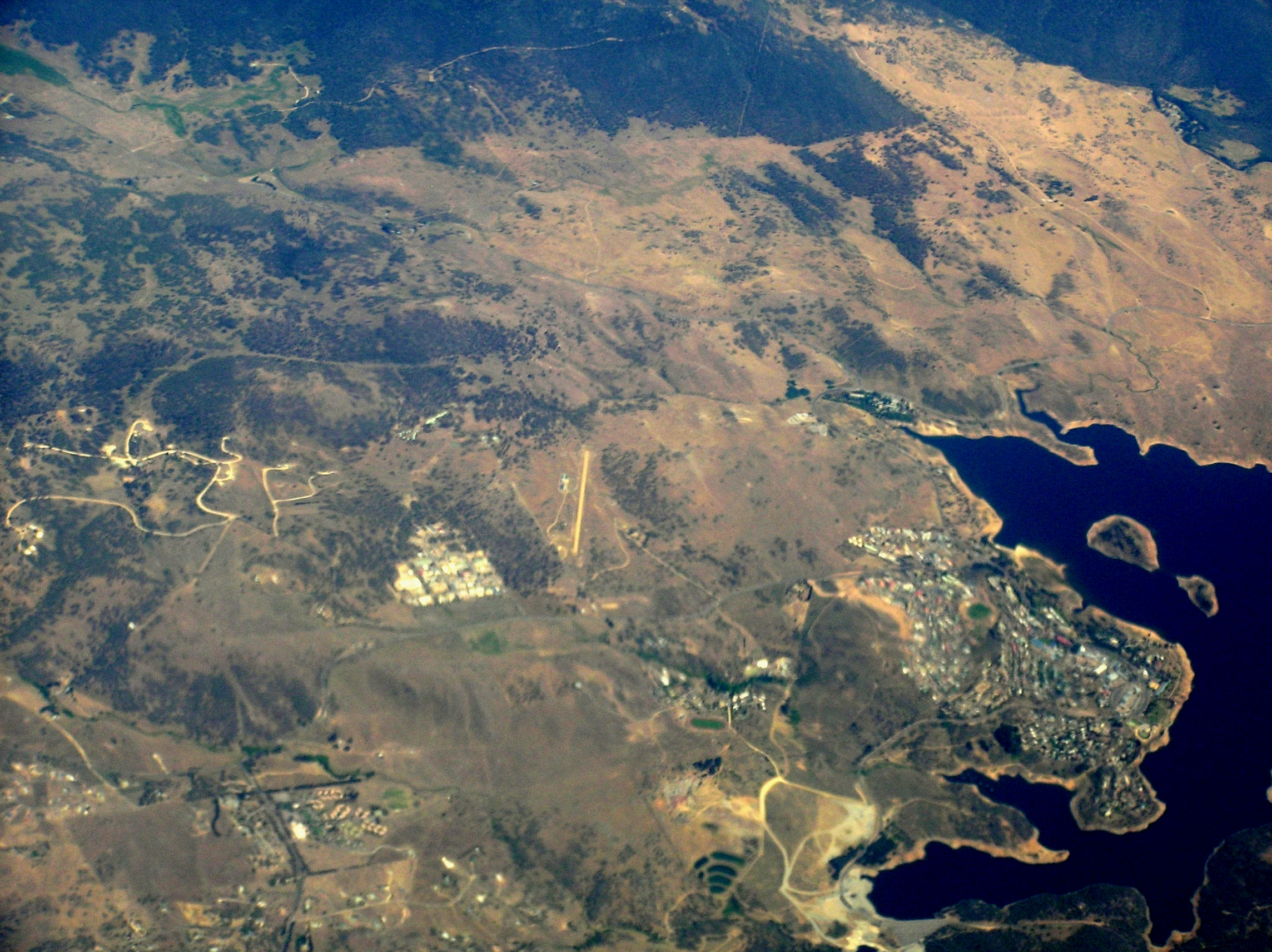
Aerial view from east

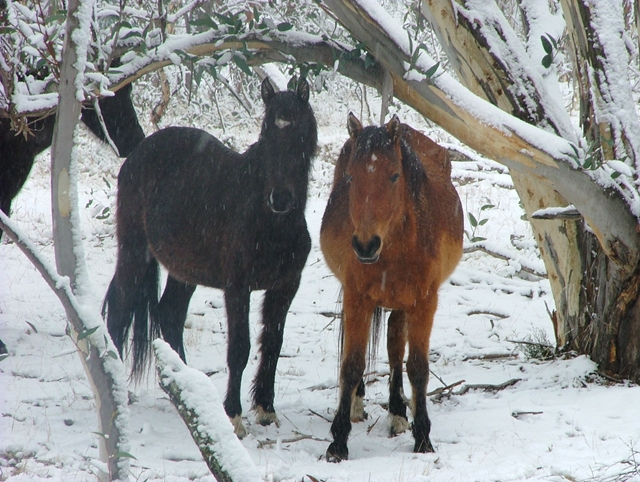
Wild brumby horses, in snow near Jindabyne.

Jindabyne Public School, Jindabyne High School (public) and Snowy Mountains Grammar School (private) serve as the town's educational facilities.

== Television ==
Jindabyne receives five free-to-air television networks including all the digital free-to-air channels relayed from Canberra, and broadcast from Jindabyne Hill.

Networks available include ABC, SBS, Seven, WIN, and Network 10.

Snowy Mountains Television is also broadcast from the same location, and operates in addition to the other broadcasters under an open narrowcasting licence.

== Radio stations ==
Radio stations in Jindabyne include:

- Raw FM 87.6
- 2XL 96.3 FM (commercial)
- Snow FM 97.7 FM (commercial)
- ABC South East NSW 95.5 FM
- Radio National 97.1 FM
- Monaro FM 93.9 FM (community)
- Racing Radio 102.7 FM

== Sports ==
Jindabyne has two major local sporting teams, the Jindabyne Bushpigs Rugby Union Club and the Snowy River Bears Rugby League club. The Bears play in the Group 16 competition, having previously played in the old Group 19 competition.

== In popular culture ==
- The Song Farewell Jindabyne was included on the 1966 The Settlers album, The Settlers Sing Song of the Snowy Mountains.
- The song Jindabyne was a single released by Rolf Harris in 1972, on Columbia records. It refers to the old town now beneath the lake.
- The 2004 Somersault was filmed in the town.
- The 2006 Australian drama film Jindabyne directed by Ray Lawrence was filmed entirely on location in and around the town. It stars Gabriel Byrne and Laura Linney.
- The song Around Jindabyne was performed by John Williamson.
- The cover photo of the Jezabels' debut album Prisoner (2011) was shot in Jindabyne.

== See also ==
- Snowy Scheme Museum
- Jindabyne Flour Mill
