= Selwyn =

Selwyn may refer to:

== People and fictional characters ==
- Selwyn (name), including lists of people and fictional characters with the surname or given name
- Selwyn (singer), Australian R&B singer Selwyn Pretorius (born 1982)

== Places ==
=== Australia ===
- Selwyn, Queensland, a ghost town
- Selwyn County, New South Wales, a cadastral division
- Selwyn Range (Australia), a range of highlands in Queensland
- Selwyn's Rock, glaciated pavement in Inman Valley, South Australia
- Selwyn Snow Resort, a ski resort in New South Wales

=== Canada ===
- Selwyn, Ontario, a township
- Selwyn Range (British Columbia), a subrange of the Canadian Rockies near Mount Robson
- Selwyn Mountains, a large mountain range in Yukon and the Northwest Territories

=== New Zealand ===
- Selwyn District, a territorial authority district in Canterbury
- Selwyn (electorate), a parliamentary electorate in Canterbury
- Selwyn River, a river in Canterbury
- Selwyn, New Zealand, a settlement in Canterbury

=== United States ===
- Selwyn, West Virginia, an unincorporated community
- Selwyn (Mechanicsville, Virginia), a historic home

== Schools ==
- Selwyn College, Cambridge, one of the University of Cambridge colleges, UK
- Selwyn College, Auckland, a co-educational high school in Auckland, New Zealand
- Selwyn College, Otago, a residential college of the University of Otago, New Zealand
- Selwyn House School, private independent boys' school in Westmount, Quebec, Canada
- Selwyn School, a private school in Denton, Texas, US

== Entertainment ==
- Harris and Selwyn Theaters, twin theaters in Chicago, Illinois, United States
- Todd Haimes Theatre, New York City, originally called the Selwyn Theatre
- Oh No It's Selwyn Froggitt, a British sitcom known as Selwyn in its final series
