= Sel =

Sel may refer to:

== People ==
- Sel (given name), a list of people with the given name

== Places ==
- Sel Municipality a municipality in Innlandet county, Norway
- Sel (village), a village within Sel Municipality in Innlandet county, Norway
- Sel Church, a church in Sel Municipality in Innlandet county, Norway

== Other ==
- HNoMS Sel, three Royal Norwegian Navy boats
- Sel (group), a Lithuanian band
- "Sel" (song), from the 2019 album Dawn Chorus by Jacques Greene
- Sel, abbreviation of Selenipedium, a genus of the orchid family

== See also ==
- Cell (disambiguation)
- SEL (disambiguation)
- Sell (disambiguation)
- Seel (disambiguation)
