= Kiandra Snow Shoe Club =

Australian skiing club in New South Wales

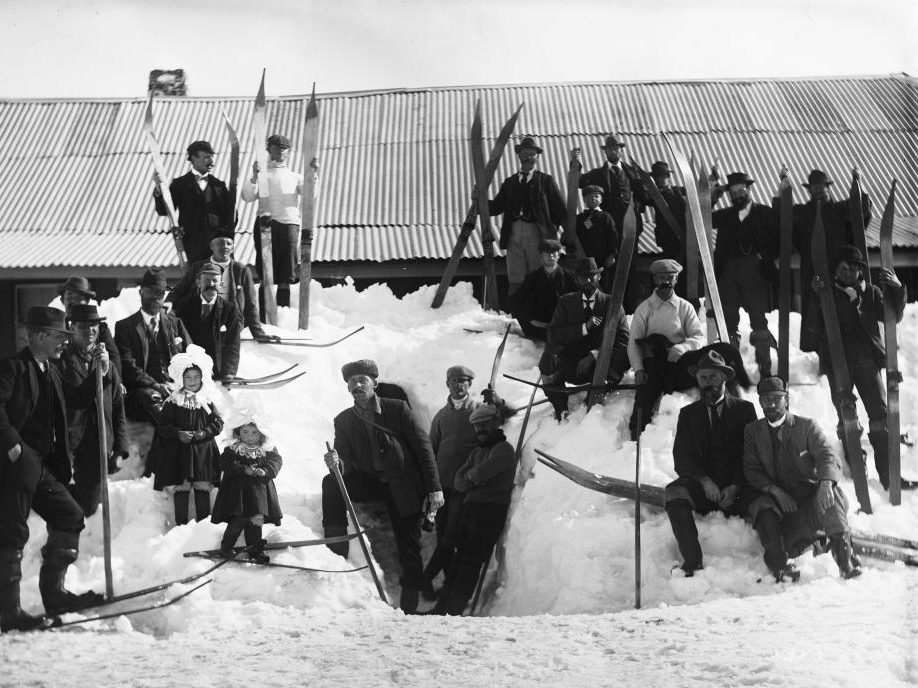
1900 Kiandra Snow Shoe Carnival.

The Kiandra Snow Shoe Club was founded in the gold-mining district of Kiandra, New South Wales (NSW), Australia by three Norwegians—as early as 1861 by some accounts— and reportedly became the "world's longest continuously running ski club" as it evolved into the present-day Kiandra Pioneer Ski Club in Perisher Valley, NSW. Whether the club is the first of its kind has been subject to debate. (Note: The debate hinges on whether the club was founded in 1861 or later. According to Clarke, Cross made a number of claims suggesting insufficient snow in the time period. Clarke counters with news accounts of snow and skiing activity during 1861. Clarke reports that as of 1929, there was no proof that the club had been formed before 1870, which was deemed to be a supportable approximate date, based on the living memories of those who remembered its formation. Clarke instead relies on a 2006 letter from the Holmenkollen Ski Museum and a 2011 letter from the FIS president on the occasion of the Kiandra Pioneer Ski Club's 150th anniversary as validation for the claim of an 1861 founding of the club. As of 2016, there are no contemporary news accounts of the founding of the club available through the National Library of Australia on-line search utility. The 1861 founding was accepted in a 1935 The Sydney Morning Herald account and in a 2011 book by Tredinnick.) In this case, "snow shoe" is an archaic term for "ski".

== History ==
As reported by Vaage, Norwegian gold miners introduced skiing in California in the 1850s. A few years later, some moved on to Australia when the news about gold at Kiandra reached California. These Norwegians introduced skiing to Kiandra as a form of recreation, as had occurred in California. The Monaro Mercury of 29 July 1861 reported that young people climbed the hills of Kiandra with [skis] and came back down at high speed. Andresen reports that, from the gold rush in 1860-1861 onwards, there were annual "ski carnivals" at Kiandra.

According to Clarke, the International Ski Federation (FIS) recognized the club "for having organized the first Alpine [sic] ski races in the history of [the] sport" in a 2011 letter.

=== Club founding ===
Vaage suggests that the Kiandra Snow Shoe Club was established around 1870, but reports that the date and circumstances are indefinite. According to Skiing Magazine, the first downhill races occurred in 1861 and the club was founded in 1870. Between the years 1861 and 1863, the Australian club members constructed and used a short, broad ski, which was designed specifically for skiing downhill and called the "Kiandra kick-in" (referring to kicking one's boot into the binding strap). According to Andresen, Jens Olsen from Tjølling, Norway, gave up gold digging and instead set up a ski manufacturing workshop, the first such factory in Australia. Andresen suggests that Jens Olsen was one of the founders of the Kiandra Snow Shoe Club. Kiandra Pioneer Ski Club (1861) historian, Norman Clarke identified Elias Gottaas. Elias along with Soren Torp and Carl Bjerknes started Kiandra Snowshoe Club in 1861.. There were championships held for cross-country skiing and ski jumping, starting in 1878.

=== Competitions ===
A variety of ethnic backgrounds were represented in the ski competitions at Kiandra. The Manaro Mercury of 10 August 1887 mentions a little girl and a lady of Chinese descent, both winning races in their category. Chinese names appear again among the winners in 1894. Vaage reports that skiers at Kiandra used wax made from oil, rubber or fat to increase downhill speed—methods that may have been introduced from California. Skis used at Kiandra were not suited for turning, so downhill races were in a straight line only. In 1908 the club reportedly held an "International Ski Carnival"—including an "International Downhill Race", which was won by an American, competing on skis made in Kiandra; other events included races for youths in categories of under eight, ten, eleven and fourteen years of age. "Open Championships" were also conducted; the events concluded with a "New Chum" event and toboggan race. Competitions continued at least until 1911, despite a decline in gold mining.

== Kiandra Pioneer Ski Club ==
In 1929, the club reorganized as the Kiandra Pioneer Ski Club. At its 1935 annual competition, "orthodox" and "straight" down-hill competitions were held. Covering the event, the Sydney Morning Herald reported that, "The Kiandra Club, which was formerly called the Kiandra Snow Shoe Club, is now 65 years old, and is probably the oldest ski club in the world." This claim was echoed by Tredinnick in 2011. As of 2016, the club operated as the "Kiandra Pioneer Ski Club (1861) Limited" and was located in Perisher Valley, New South Wales, its new home as of 1966.

== Gallery ==
Images taken at Kiandra ski and toboggan competitions by Charles Kerry, ca. 1900.

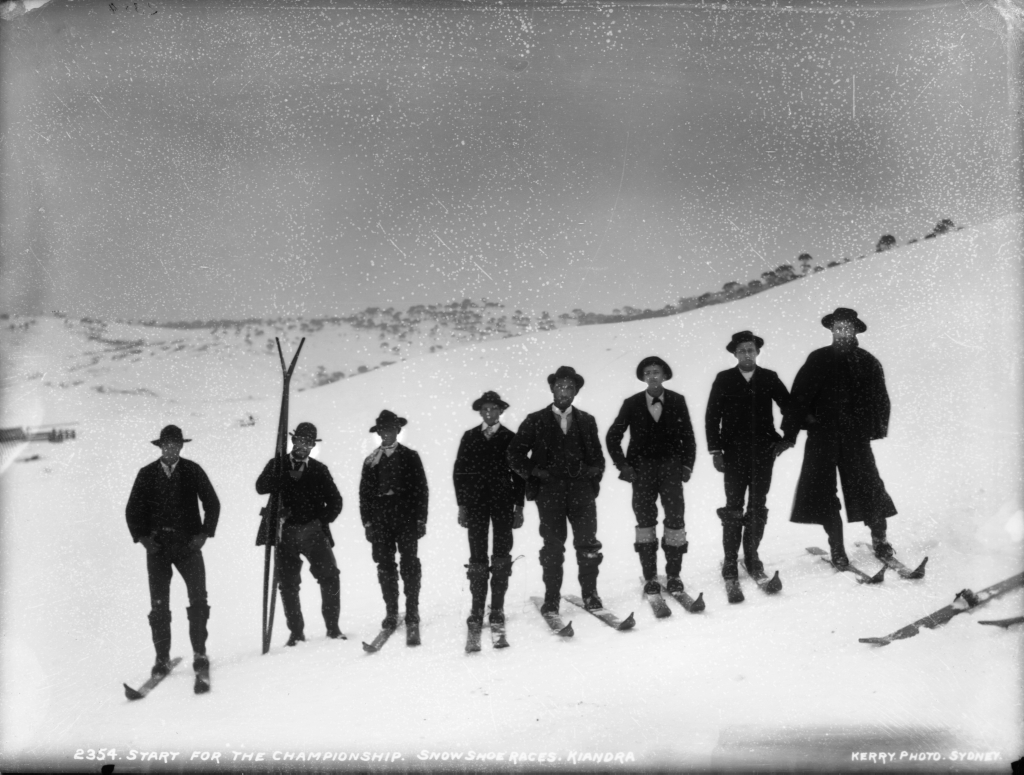
Ready for the men's championship races.

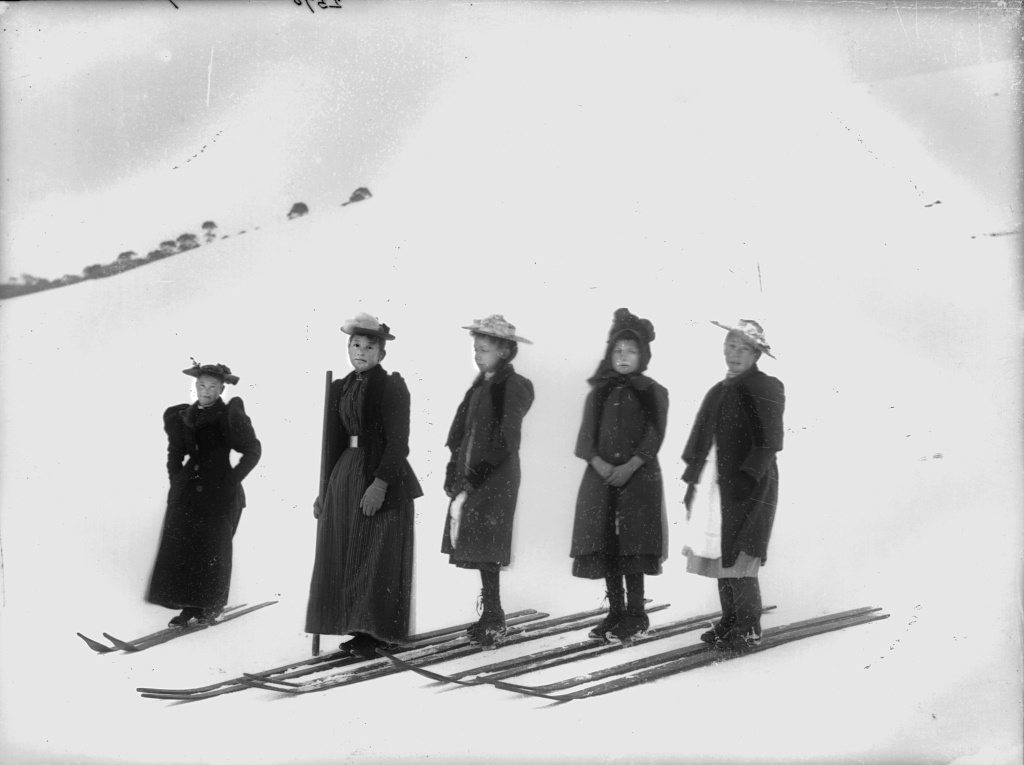
Ready for the girls' championship races.

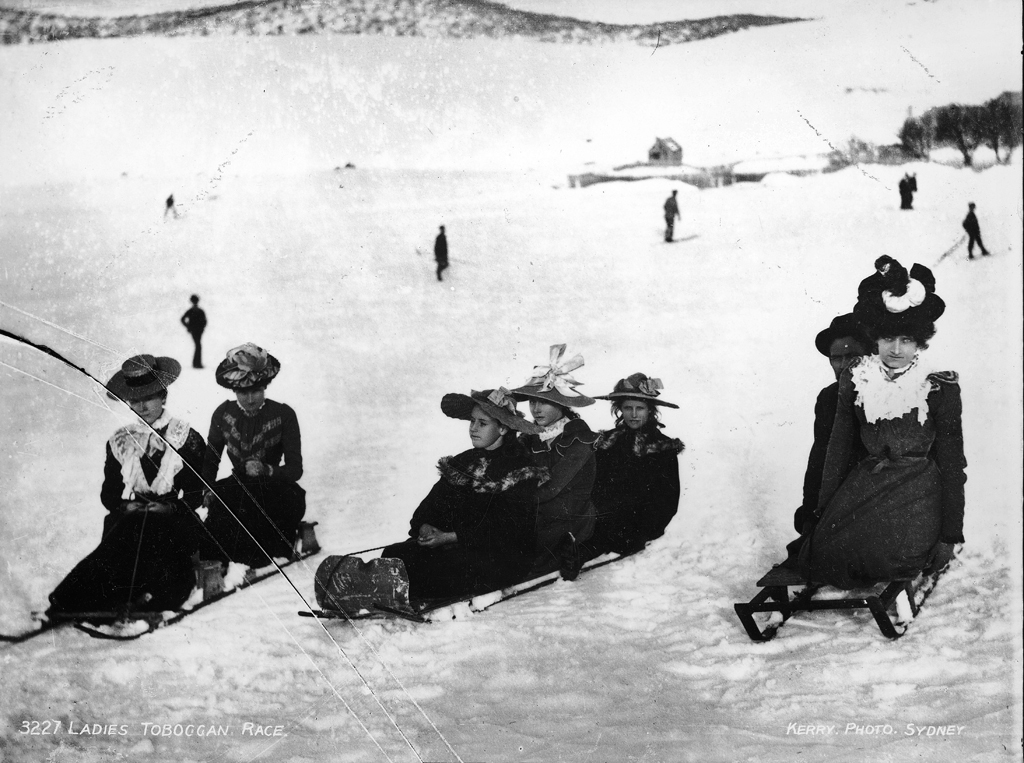
Ladies' toboggan race.

== See also ==
- History of skiing
- Skiing in Australia
- Skiing in New South Wales
