= SEL =

SEL may refer to:

- Signalling Equipment Ltd, a trading name used by the British toy manufacturer J & L Randall
- Finnish Food Workers' Union, a trade union in Finland
- Left Ecology Freedom (Sinistra Ecologia Libertà), Italian political party
- Selkirkshire, historic county in Scotland, Chapman code
- Single-event latchup
- Social and Emotional Learning, a pedagogy focusing on the study and application of Emotional intelligence (EI)
- Social Enterprise London
- Swedish Elite League, the English unofficial name of the Elitserien ice hockey league
- Système d'Échange Local, a French Local Exchange Trading System

== Art ==
- Sensory Ethnography Lab, a filmmaking and anthropology center at Harvard University
- Serial Experiments Lain, a 1998 anime series
- Shankar–Ehsaan–Loy, a trio of music composers from India

== Language ==
- Self-learning of English Language
- SEL: Studies in English Literature, an academic journal
- Skolta Esperanto Ligo, an Esperanto Scouting association

== Technology ==
- Schweitzer Engineering Laboratories, a worldwide power systems company
- Search Engine Land, a website covering search engine related news
- Security-Enhanced Linux (SELinux) is a Linux kernel security module that provides a mechanism for supporting access control security policies, including mandatory access controls (MAC).
- Standard Elektrik Lorenz, a German electronics firm
- Station of Extreme Light, a Chinese laser laboratory.
- Systems Engineering Laboratories, an early computer manufacturer specializing in realtime systems
- System Event Log, the logs such as server logs

== Transportation ==
- Mercedes-Benz SEL, an automobile model
- The former IATA Airport code for Gimpo International Airport in Seoul, Korea (Currently GMP)
- Southern Evacuation Lifeline, a proposed limited-access highway in Horry County, South Carolina

== See also ==
- Sel (disambiguation)
