= Cabramurra, New South Wales =

Cabramurra
- Town
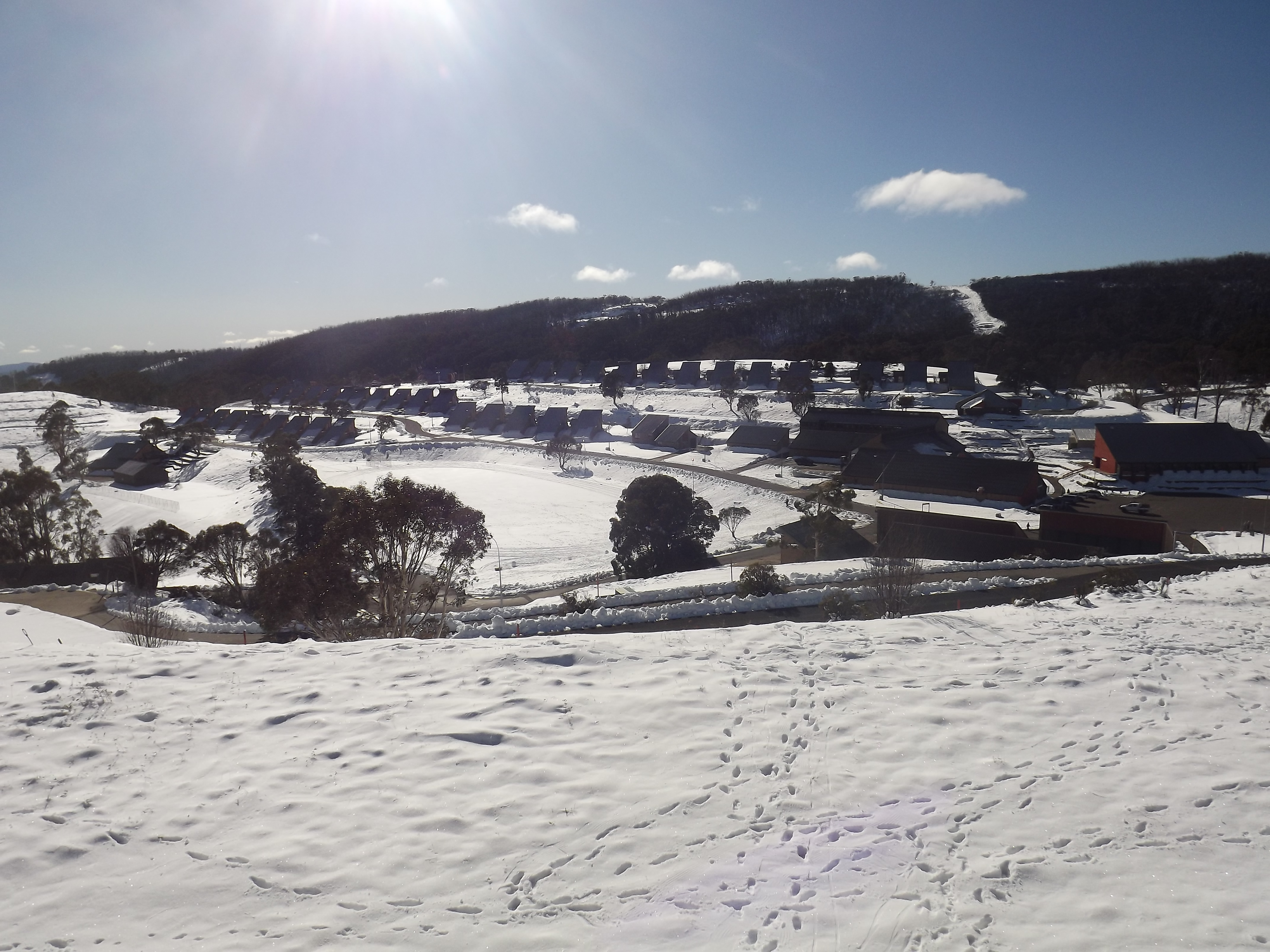
- Cabramurra town, afternoon in winter, looking north from the lookout

- Coordinates: 35°55′59″S 148°22′59″E
- Country: Australia
- State: New South Wales
- LGA: Snowy Valleys Shire
- Location: 503 km (313 mi) SW of Sydney; 223 km (139 mi) WSW of Canberra; 109 km (68 mi) WNW of Cooma; 110 km (68 mi) SSE of Tumut
- Established: 1954

Government
  - State electorate: Albury
  - Federal division: Eden-Monaro
- Elevation: 1,488 m (4,882 ft)

Population
  - Total: 37 (2016 census)
- Postcode: 2629
- Mean max temp: 11.5 °C (52.7 °F)
- Mean min temp: 4.0 °C (39.2 °F)
- Annual rainfall: 1,700.1 mm (66.93 in)

Cabramurra is a town situated at 1,488 metres (4,882 ft) on the western side of the Snowy Mountains (or South West Slopes), along the Great Dividing Range in the state of New South Wales. It is 82 metres (269 ft) lower than Dinner Plain in Victoria, and 272 metres (892 ft) lower than Charlotte Pass Village in New South Wales. From the 1950s until 2018 it had a resident population, serving the Snowy Hydro scheme, including facilities such as pubs, general store, a library and a primary school. However, this ended with the switch to contractors operating on a drive-in/drive-out basis. The name Cabramurra may be derived from Wiradjuri gambirra marra ("crooked hand").

== History ==
Cabramurra was established in 1954 using prefabricated houses trucked in from nearby Cooma, as part of the Snowy Mountains Scheme and associated Snowy Mountains Hydro-Electric Scheme. An earlier surveying camp had been established there in 1951.

Initially 400 workers and their families lived in the town, with visits from around 2000 workers during leave.

The town hosted several royal visits, including the Queen Mother and Prince Charles stayed the night in the town during their tour in 1966 and Prince Souvanna Phouma, the Prime Minister of Laos in 1967.

The town was moved & rebuilt some 500m and 20m vertically to a more sheltered position, its current site, in 1974, leaving the original site as the lookout. The new houses were built with Besser blocks to a design specifically tailored to the environment at a cost of $3m. Long, steep roofs allow snow to slide off, and the interiors are designed around a central heater (originally fuelled by oil) which warms all rooms in the house either directly or indirectly (chimney passes between upstairs bedrooms). All power and phone lines are routed underground. The original 1950's houses were either demolished or relocated to Talbingo, Adaminaby and Jindabyne.

In early January 2020 the town was damaged by fire during the 2019–20 Australian bushfire season. In the town itself a "significant number" of houses and buildings were lost, plus the school and old ski club.

== Present status ==
Cabramurra is a 'company town', being the place of residence for workers in the nearby Tumut 1 and Tumut 2 power stations and electrical switching yards, and Tumut Pondage dam. Only persons directly employed by Snowy Hydro, and their families, are permitted to live in the town.

The town had 45 houses, 100+ units, a general store and petrol station, primary school, wet canteen (pub) (tavern), indoor swimming pool, single 'Poma' tow downhill ski slope, and tennis courts. The nearest small town for other shopping is Adaminaby; the nearest large towns/cities (that is, with a hospital) are Canberra, Tumut and Cooma. Emergency evacuation can be conducted by helicopter.

The primary school has one classroom, with one teacher in charge of all the children. The nearest high schools are at Tumbarumba and Cooma, but only Tumbarumba is served by a daily bus service.

The short Snowy Hydro airstrip on the plateau above the town is often used by military aircraft practising short landing/takeoff exercises. The town's water supply is close to this airstrip and is known as "Dry Dam", on the dirt road that goes to Kiandra via "Kings Cross" and the Selwyn Snowfields day-only ski resort.

In winter, unlike the vast majority of Australia, the town can be covered by snow for 3–4 months. This has dictated the building design, with very highly pitched roofs for the houses. The town's downhill ski run was the first in Australia to have lighting installed to allow night use.

The town is located within the boundaries of Kosciuszko National Park, on the road between Kiandra on the Snowy Mountains Highway to the north and Khancoban, another hydro-electric power site, to the south. The road is kept open to and beyond Kiandra by snow plough during winter, also serving the Selwyn Snowfields. The road south of Tumut Pond Dam is closed to traffic.

The permanent workforce of the settlement is currently being replaced with drive-in/drive-out staff, however the school will remain open to service surrounding areas. There is no overnight visitor accommodation.

== Climate ==
Cabramurra has a cold oceanic climate (Cfb), with cool summers and cold, very snowy winters. While the town is very wet during the winter months, it is sunnier than Khancoban to the west as it sits high enough to lie above the clouds (or LCL) for a good portion of winter; as low, heavy cloud and fog predominate in these months.

Owing to the town's exposed position, perched over the western escarpment of the ranges, temperature inversion alone is insufficient for low minima as the coldest air drains into the valleys and plains; this gives Cabramurra much milder minimum temperatures than the surrounding plateau, such as at nearby Kiandra. Cabramurra instead requires the presence of a heavy snow pack to get very low temperatures, and often the low temperatures are attained with stormy weather. The town is usually snow-bound from June to September, as it lies well above the snow line. Cabramurra receives an average of 53.2 snowy days annually.

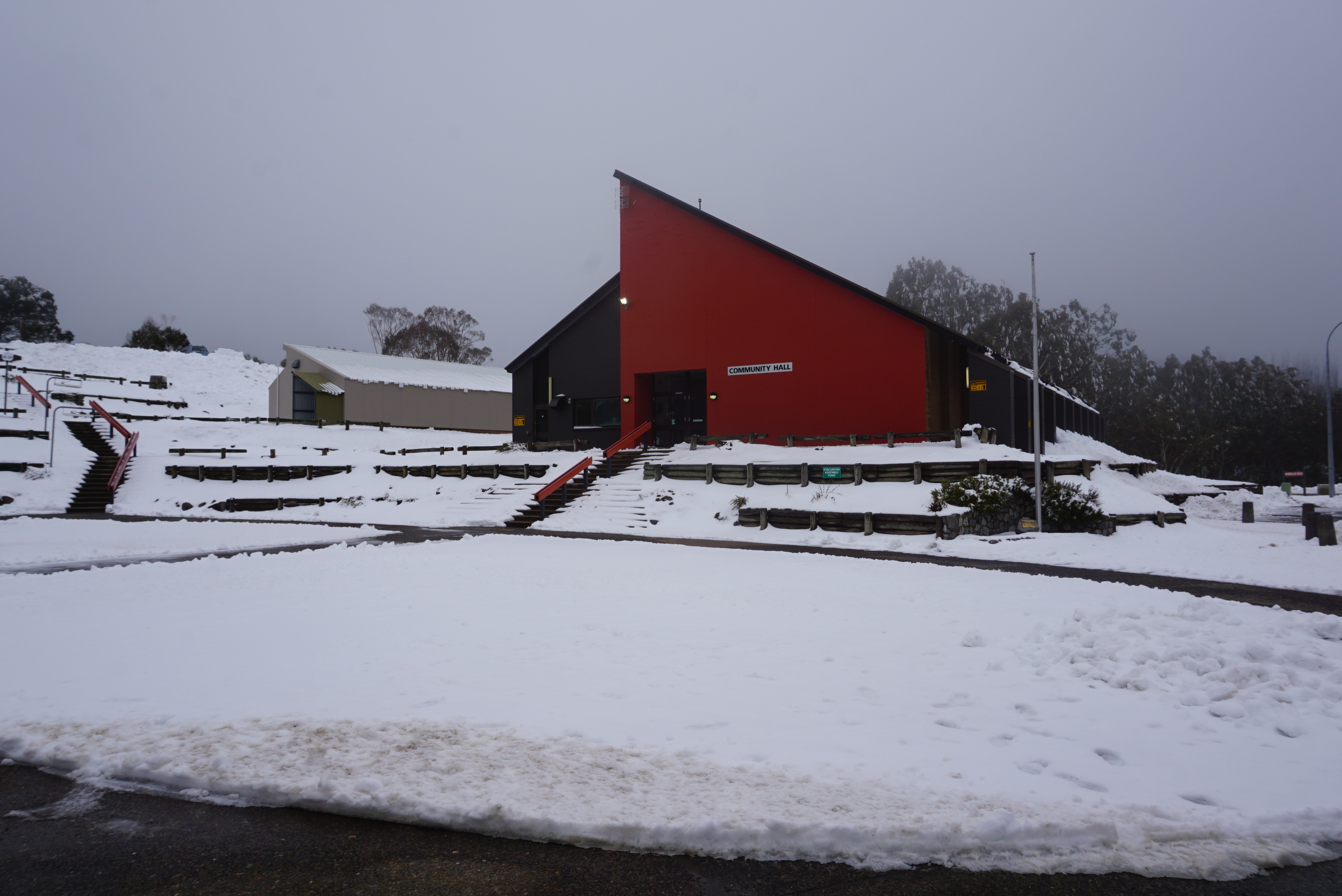
Cabramurra Community Hall in Winter

Climate data for Cabramurra SMHEA (1962–1999, rainfall to 1955); 1,475 m AMSL; 35.94° S, 148.38° E
Month	Jan	Feb	Mar	Apr	May	Jun	Jul	Aug	Sep	Oct	Nov	Dec	Year
Record high °C (°F)	31.1 (88.0)	31.9 (89.4)	27.5 (81.5)	23.6 (74.5)	18.9 (66.0)	13.8 (56.8)	11.6 (52.9)	14.9 (58.8)	19.8 (67.6)	22.5 (72.5)	28.5 (83.3)	28.4 (83.1)	31.9 (89.4)
Mean daily maximum °C (°F)	19.7 (67.5)	19.9 (67.8)	16.7 (62.1)	12.1 (53.8)	8.0 (46.4)	4.9 (40.8)	3.1 (37.6)	3.9 (39.0)	7.1 (44.8)	11.4 (52.5)	14.3 (57.7)	17.4 (63.3)	11.5 (52.8)
Mean daily minimum °C (°F)	9.6 (49.3)	9.9 (49.8)	7.8 (46.0)	4.7 (40.5)	2.0 (35.6)	−0.4 (31.3)	−1.8 (28.8)	−1.2 (29.8)	0.5 (32.9)	3.2 (37.8)	5.4 (41.7)	7.8 (46.0)	4.0 (39.1)
Record low °C (°F)	−0.5 (31.1)	−2.1 (28.2)	−3.4 (25.9)	−7.2 (19.0)	−7.4 (18.7)	−7.3 (18.9)	−11.0 (12.2)	−11.2 (11.8)	−8.1 (17.4)	−7.2 (19.0)	−5.1 (22.8)	−2.7 (27.1)	−11.2 (11.8)
Average precipitation mm (inches)	99.2 (3.91)	66.6 (2.62)	91.0 (3.58)	110.7 (4.36)	165.3 (6.51)	164.8 (6.49)	204.5 (8.05)	203.9 (8.03)	172.6 (6.80)	177.4 (6.98)	126.9 (5.00)	117.2 (4.61)	1,700.1 (66.94)
Average precipitation days (≥ 0.2 mm)	9.5	8.1	9.5	10.5	13.9	15.1	17.3	18.1	15.7	14.7	12.9	10.8	156.1
Mean monthly sunshine hours	288.3	251.4	241.8	195.0	142.6	114.0	111.6	124.0	156.0	213.9	240.0	282.1	2,360.7
Source: Australian Bureau of Meteorology; Cabramurra SMHEA

The difference in rainfall between the two sites, SMHEA and SMHEA AWS, owes largely to the lack of rain gauge heating at the latter site, which leads to unregistered precipitation when a great mass of snow accumulates. This is evident by the greatly reduced winter rainfall in particular, as much of that would have fallen as snow and gone unregistered by the AWS gauge.

Climate data for Cabramurra SMHEA AWS (1996–2023); 1,482 m AMSL; 35.94° S, 148.38° E
Month	Jan	Feb	Mar	Apr	May	Jun	Jul	Aug	Sep	Oct	Nov	Dec	Year
Record high °C (°F)	34.0 (93.2)	31.5 (88.7)	28.4 (83.1)	23.3 (73.9)	16.4 (61.5)	15.0 (59.0)	11.8 (53.2)	15.5 (59.9)	20.0 (68.0)	23.5 (74.3)	27.6 (81.7)	30.3 (86.5)	34.0 (93.2)
Mean daily maximum °C (°F)	21.5 (70.7)	20.5 (68.9)	17.4 (63.3)	12.9 (55.2)	8.4 (47.1)	5.3 (41.5)	3.9 (39.0)	5.0 (41.0)	8.7 (47.7)	12.3 (54.1)	15.5 (59.9)	18.6 (65.5)	12.5 (54.5)
Mean daily minimum °C (°F)	11.7 (53.1)	11.0 (51.8)	8.8 (47.8)	5.9 (42.6)	2.7 (36.9)	0.5 (32.9)	−0.8 (30.6)	−0.5 (31.1)	1.8 (35.2)	4.3 (39.7)	7.0 (44.6)	9.2 (48.6)	5.1 (41.2)
Record low °C (°F)	−0.7 (30.7)	−1.4 (29.5)	−1.3 (29.7)	−3.7 (25.3)	−5.1 (22.8)	−7.0 (19.4)	−7.0 (19.4)	−6.8 (19.8)	−6.5 (20.3)	−6.0 (21.2)	−4.7 (23.5)	−3.0 (26.6)	−7.0 (19.4)
Average precipitation mm (inches)	75.6 (2.98)	79.4 (3.13)	86.9 (3.42)	76.4 (3.01)	94.2 (3.71)	124.5 (4.90)	113.8 (4.48)	127.7 (5.03)	126.7 (4.99)	111.7 (4.40)	122.2 (4.81)	90.1 (3.55)	1,229.2 (48.41)
Average precipitation days (≥ 0.2 mm)	8.1	7.4	8.2	7.9	10.6	13.3	14.7	14.4	12.8	11.2	10.9	8.6	128.1
Average afternoon relative humidity (%)	52	54	56	64	75	82	83	79	72	65	61	54	66
Source: Australian Bureau of Meteorology; Cabramurra SMHEA AWS

== Gallery ==
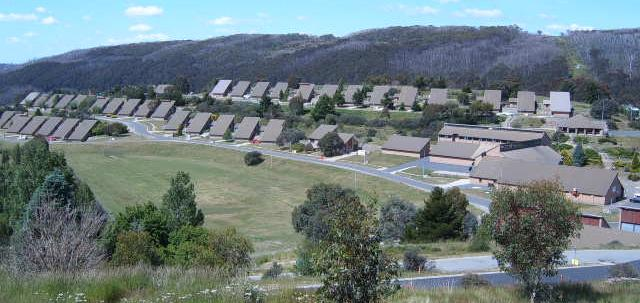
Cabramurra in summer, 2005

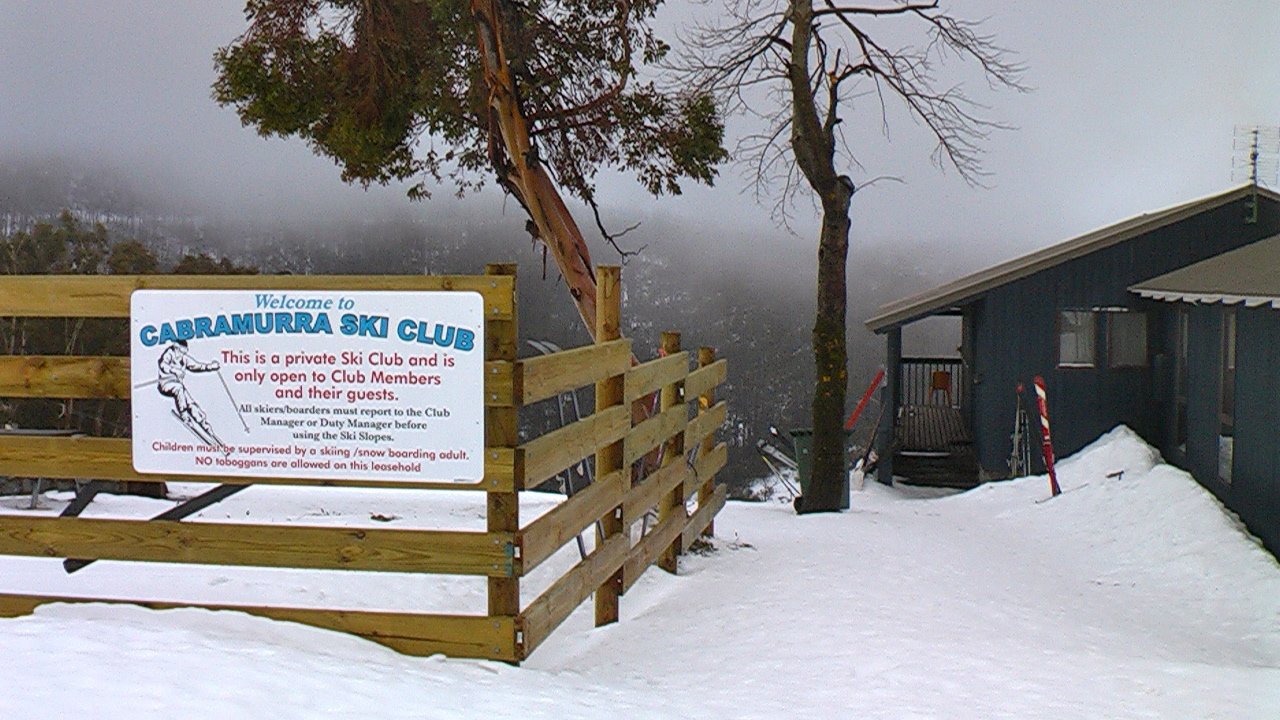
Cabramurra Ski Club has a Poma lift and clubhouse for the private use of members

== See also ==
- Snowy Scheme Museum
- Skiing in New South Wales
- Skiing in Australia
