= Skiing in New South Wales =

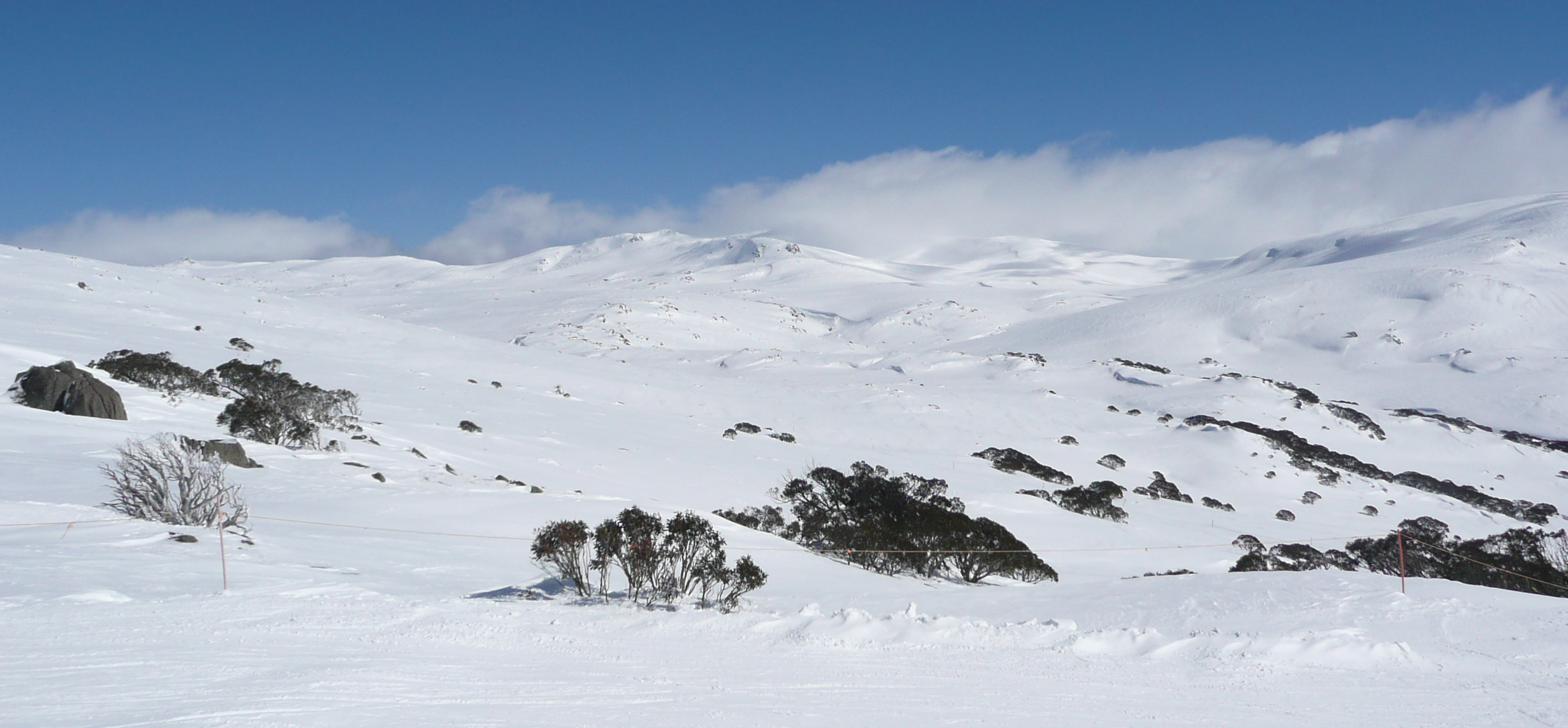
The Kosciuszko Main Range

Skiing in New South Wales takes place in the high country of the Snowy Mountains of New South Wales during the Southern Hemisphere winter.

Skiing in Australia began at the goldrush town of Kiandra, New South Wales around 1861. New South Wales has skiable terrain between elevations of around 1300m to 2200m, with viable winter snows generally found above 1500m: Perisher, near Jindabyne, has Australia's highest lifted point at 2042m and its base elevation is 1720m. Kiandra, in the Northern Skifields, has an elevation of 1400m.

New South Wales has well-developed downhill ski resorts at Thredbo, Charlotte Pass, Perisher and Selwyn Snowfields.Cross country skiing is possible across the Kosciuszko National Park.

== History and major locations ==
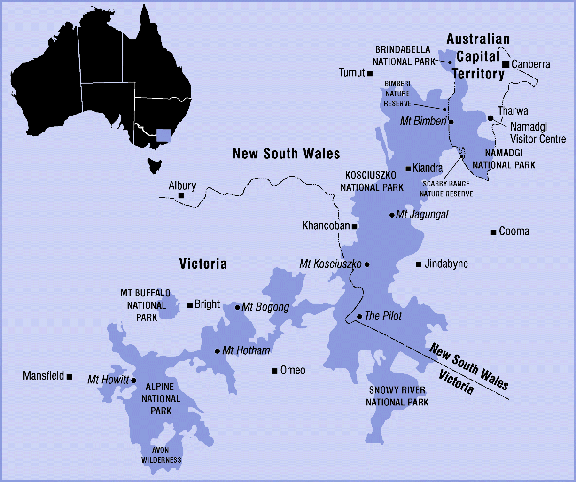
Alpine National Parks of the Australian mainland.

Jindabyne is the main service town for the New South Wales resorts, but most resort centres have on-snow accommodation. Other ski-service towns include Cooma and Adaminaby. Canberra is situated around two hours from the New South Wales ski-fields. Australia's highest town, Cabramurra, New South Wales, has private skiing facilities for residents.

The mainland's highest peak is Mount Kosciuszko at 2228m. (Note: As regards regions with skiable terrain, the Australian Government's Geoscience Australia Website records the highest mountains by State and Territory as follows: Mount Kosciuszko, NSW, 2228; Mount Bogong, VIC, 1986m; Bimberi Peak, ACT, 1912m; Mount Ossa, TAS, 1617m (while the highest mountain on Australian Territory is actually Mawson Peak, Heard Island, at 2745m, which despite being snowbound, has no ski industry owing to its extreme isolation).)

=== New South Wales ===
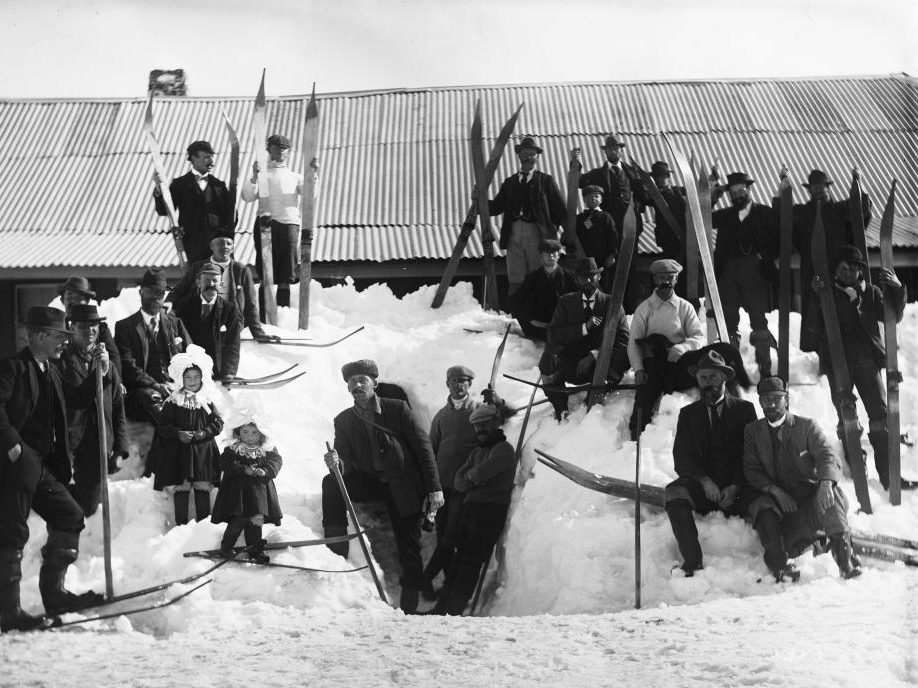
Kiandra, NSW, where skiing began in Australia in 1861

New South Wales is home to Australia's highest snow country, oldest skifields and largest resorts. Recreational skiing in Australia began around 1861 at Kiandra, New South Wales, when Norwegian gold miners introduced the idea to the frozen hills around the town. The first and longest surviving ski club in the world, The Kiandra Snow Shoe Club is believed to have been formed at Kiandra in that year.

==== Kiandra and the northern skifields ====
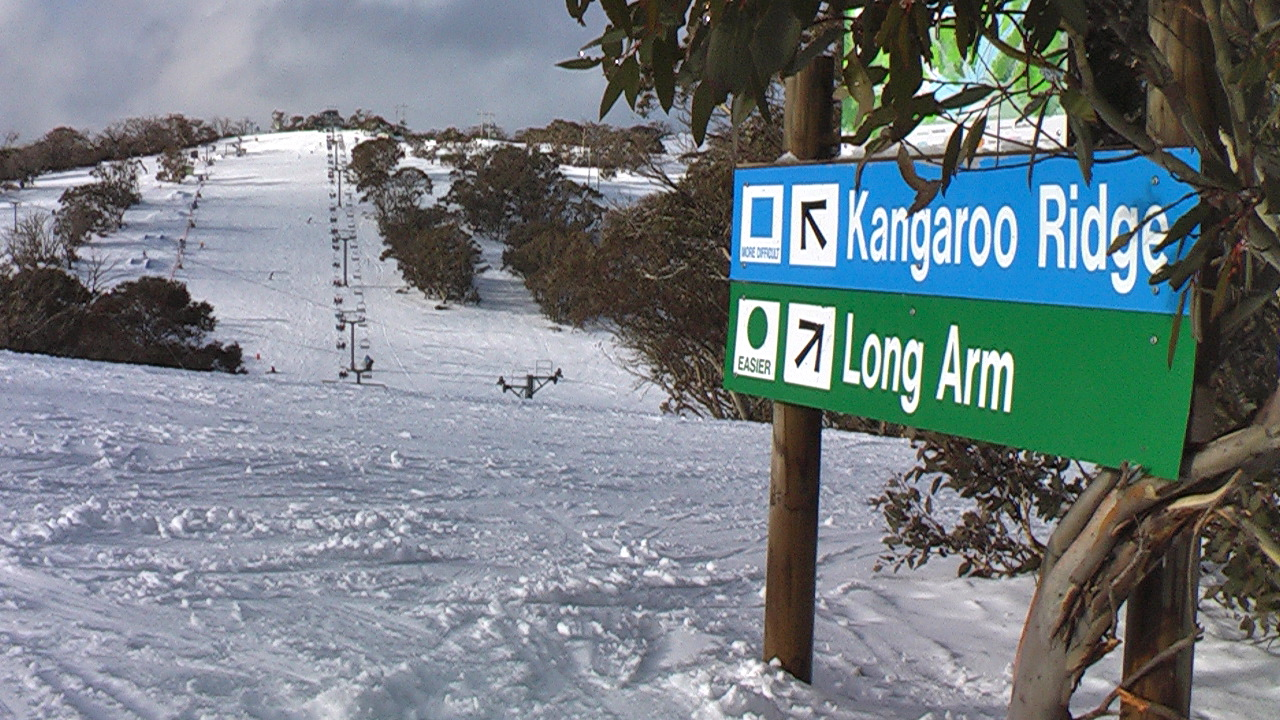
Selwyn Snowfields is the most northerly of Australia's ski resorts.

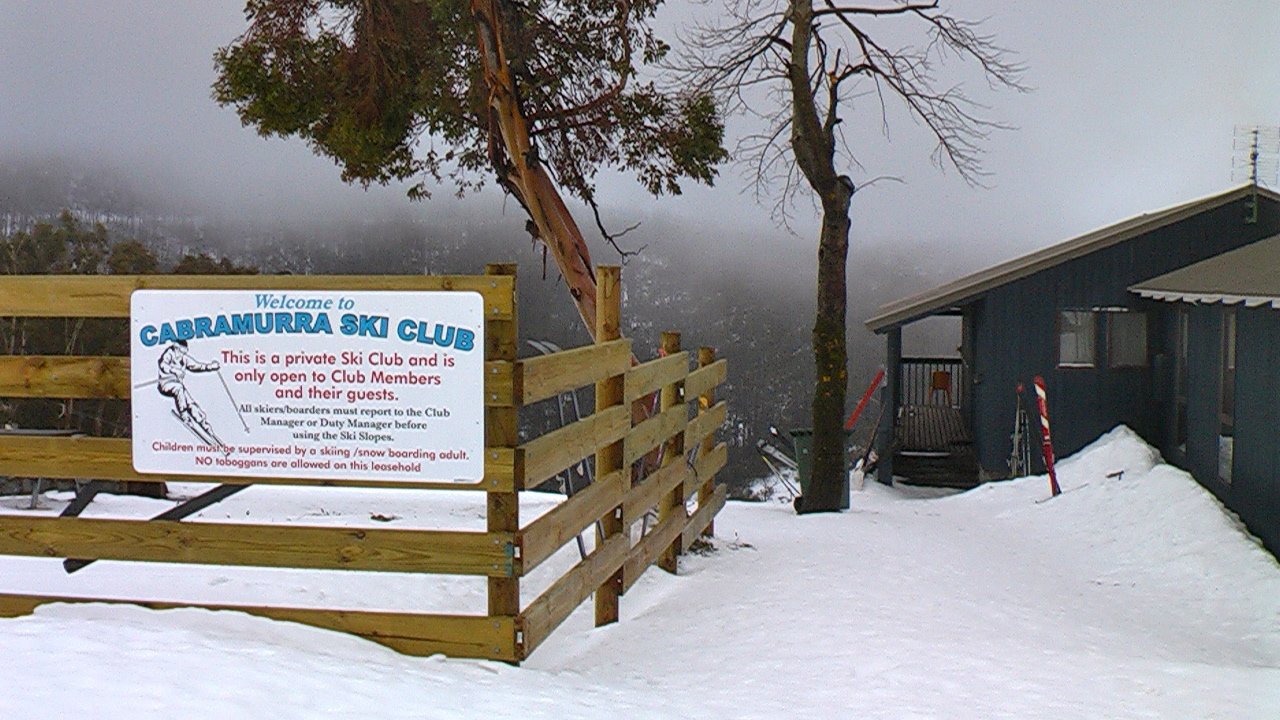
Cabramurra Ski Club. Cabramurra is Australia's highest town and has a private ski club slope for the use of members.

Skiing in Australia began in the northern section of the Snowy Mountains during the Kiandra goldrush. Kiandra is often isolated by deep snow which made it inaccessible during winter. In 1861, Norwegian miners introduced recreational skiing to the mining settlement by converting fence posts into skis. Ski races were held annually on Township Hill at Kiandra, which led to the founding of the Kiandra Snow Shoe Club—reportedly becoming the "world's longest continuously running ski club" as it evolved into the present-day Kiandra Pioneer Ski Club in Perisher Valley, NSW. Whether the club is the first of its kind has been subject to debate.

An Onion Valley Snow Shoe Club was reported in America in 1861. The "Trysil Skytte- og Skiløberforening" (Shot and Ski Practitioner Association) was also founded in Norway, in 1861. The association held their first competition in January 1862 Alpine skiing, as a sport, commenced over twenty-five years before any ski club can be identified as being formed in Europe. Alpine ski clubs were first founded in Munich, Germany 1891, Switzerland 1893, Arlberg, Austria 1901, followed by France and Italy. Sir Arnold Lunn founded the Kandahar Ski Club of Great Britain in 1924.

The "Kiandra Snow Shoe Club" held separate ski races for both ladies and children as early as 1885. Barbara Yan was the first identifiable woman documented as to having won a Downhill Skiing Championship. Yan also won the ladies downhill in 1887, the year her siblings won the girls' under-8 section and second in the under-12s. In 1908 the club held the first ever documented International and Intercontinental Downhill Skiing Carnival. Results – America 1st, Australia 2nd, England 3rd.

Australia's longest running skiing competition is The Balmain Cup. By 1933 team racing was open to virtually all competitors from any club or imported talents but Arthur Balmain of Cooma believed this was unfair to local enthusiasts. He donated a perpetual trophy open only to competitors residing in or about the Southern Districts and only for members who held membership for twelve weeks in the local ski club. Arthur Balmain, whose company transported skiers to all localities, envisaged a competition that would encompass all clubs. He decreed that a team must compete for the Balmain Cup with all members competing in four disciplines: Downhill, Slalom, Jump and Langlauf. In 1946 the competition format for competitors eligibility was changed and the jump section was removed.

In the wilderness region south of Kiandra, The Alpine Hut, near Mount Jagungal, was built in 1939 to cater for skiers. Access was arduous – via packhorse and ski.

The Kiandra Goldrush was short-lived, but the township remained a service centre for recreational and survival skiing for over a century. The Kiandra courthouse closed as a police station in 1937, and was for a time used as a private residence, before becoming the Kiandra Chalet (until 1953) and later the Kiandra Chalet Hotel. Ski lifts were installed, Snowy Mountains Scheme construction workers frequented the chalet bar and Kiandra's fortunes were briefly revived.

The Snowy Scheme also necessitated the construction nearby of Cabramurra, which, at 1488 m, remains Australia's highest township and has its own private lifted ski run for the use of members of the Cabramurra Ski Club.

The Kiandra Chalet closed in 1973 and the building became a Roads Depot building. The township itself became a ghost town. Australia's first T-bar lift had been installed on Township Hill in 1957, but in 1978, Kiandra's ski lift operations re-located permanently to nearby Mount Selwyn (Selwyn Snowfields). Selwyn is the most northerly of Australia's ski resorts with a base elevation of 1492 m and a top elevation of 1614 m. Selwyn is well suited to families and first timers, with 88% of terrain catering to beginners and intermediates, however the steeper gradient of the Racecourse Run provides some more challenging terrain for advanced skiers and boarders. The longest run at Selwyn is the 800m "Long Arm Run".

Longer slopes and more reliable snows lie further to the south and in the 20th century, the focus of recreational skiing in New South Wales shifted southward, to the Mount Kosciuszko region. The history of skiing at Kiandra has been the subject of several studies, including 1959's Historic Kiandra, written by the Kiandra Historical Society and Kiandra Gold fields to Ski fields (2006) by Norman W. Clarke.

==== The Kosciuszko region ====
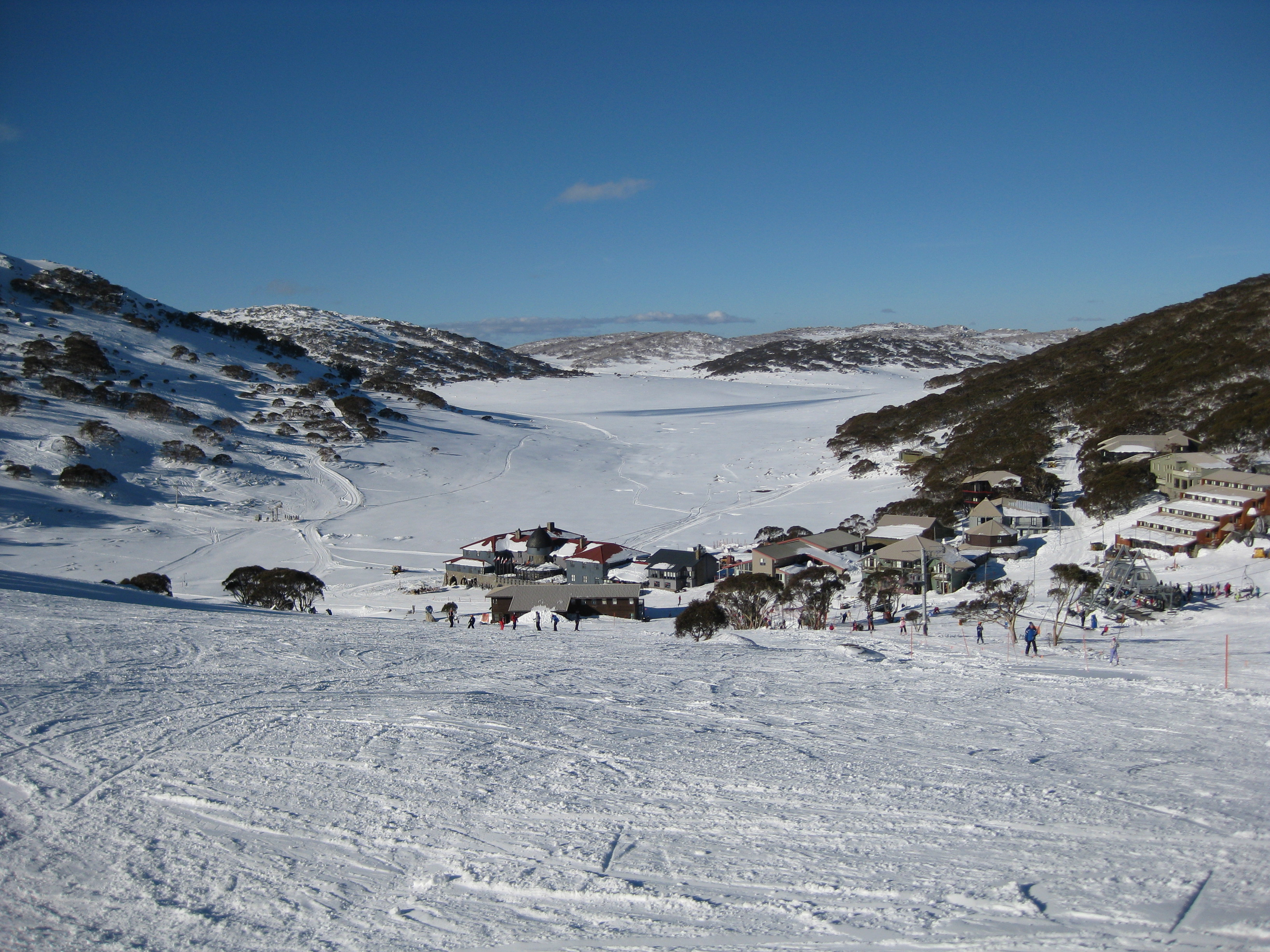
Charlotte Pass, a pioneer of the Australian ski industry. Village Elevation at 1760m

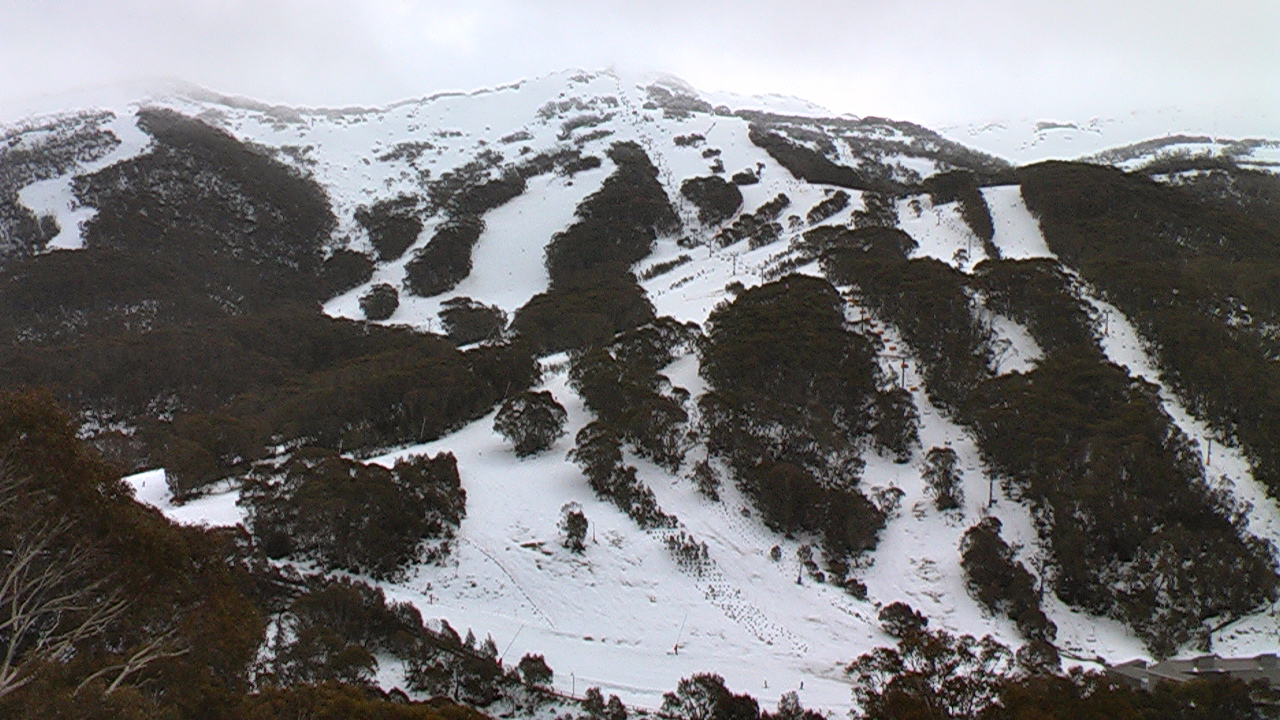
Thredbo, NSW, has the largest vertical drop of any Australian ski resort at 672m.

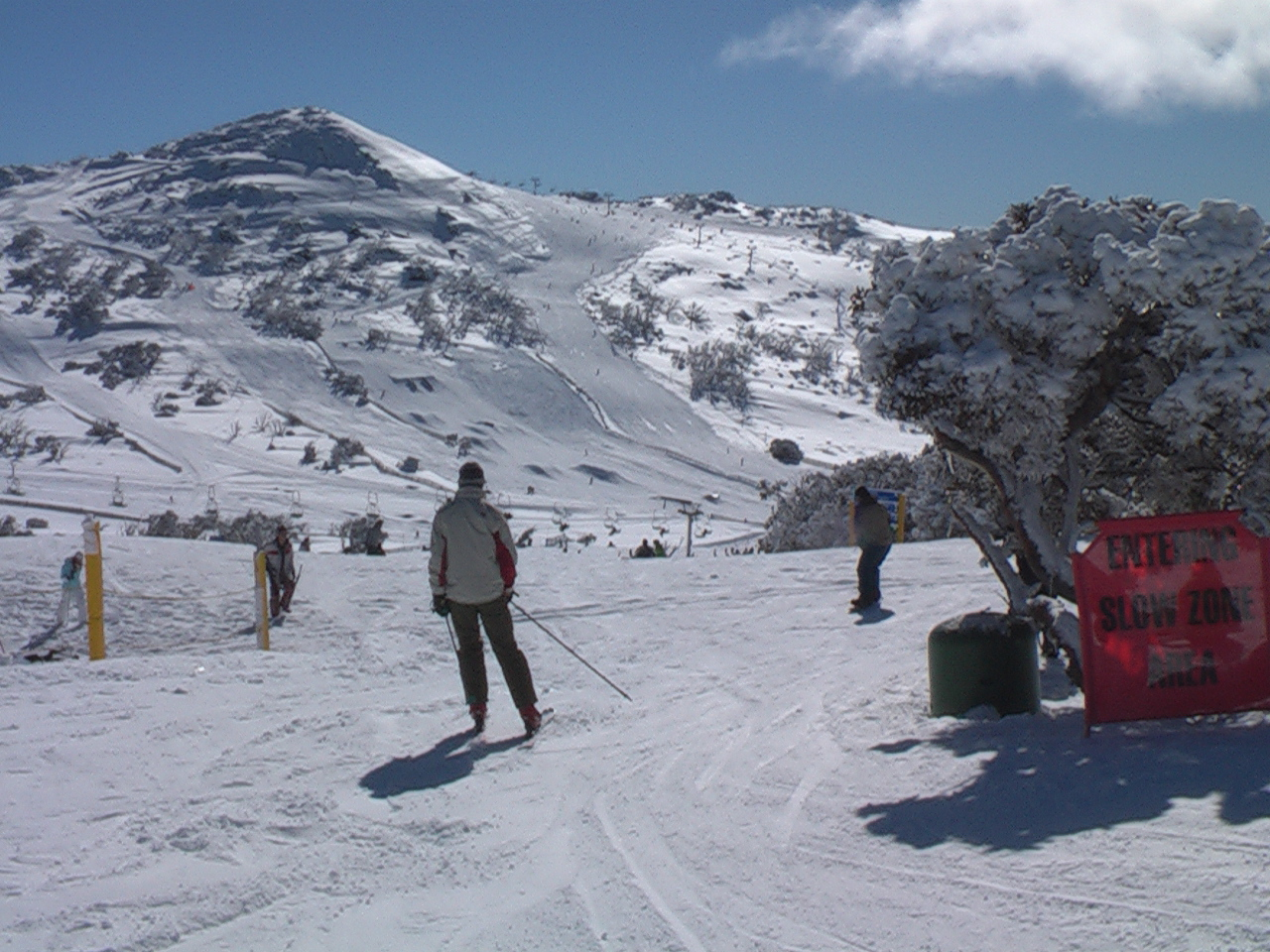
Blue Cow Mountain, part of Perisher ski resort (Australia's largest ski resort).

In 1900, a hut was built at Bett's Camp, above the Thredbo Escarpment and came into use for winter skiers. The Hotel Kosciusko was opened by the New South Wales Government in 1909 at what is now Sponars Chalet, near Smiggin Holes.

The first Kosciuszko Chalet was built at Charlotte Pass in 1930, giving relatively comfortable access to Australia's highest terrain. In 1964, Australia briefly boasted the "World's Longest Chairlift", designed to carry skiers from the Thredbo Valley to Charlotte Pass, but technical difficulties soon closed the facility. At 1760m, Charlotte Pass has the highest village base elevation of any Australia ski resort and can only be accessed via over-snow transport in winter. The growing number of ski enthusiasts heading to Charlotte Pass led to the establishment of a cafe at Smiggin Holes around 1939, where horse-drawn sleighs would deliver skiers to be begin the arduous ski to the Kosciuszko Chalet. It was the construction of the vast Snowy Mountains Hydro-Electric Scheme from 1949 that really opened up the Snowy Mountains for large scale development of a ski industry and led to the establishment of Thredbo and Perisher as leading Australian resorts. The Construction of Guthega Dam brought skiers to the isolated Guthega district and a rope tow was installed there in 1957.

Skifields up by Kosciuszko's side were also established during this period, though their existence is now little realised. The Australian Alpine Club was founded in 1950 by Charles Anton with a view to establishing a chain of lodges for ski touring across the Australian Alps. Huts were constructed in the "Back Country" close to Mount Kosciuszko, including Kunama Hut, which opened for the 1953 season. A rope tow was installed on Mount Northcote at the site and opened in 1954. The site proved excellent for speed skiing, but the hut was destroyed in an avalanche, which also killed one person, in 1956.

Anton also recognised the potential of the Thredbo Valley for construction of a major resort and village, with good vertical terrain. Construction began in 1957. Today, Thredbo has 14 ski-lifts and possesses Australia's longest ski resort run, the 5.9 km from Karel's T-Bar to Friday Flat; Australia's greatest vertical drop of 672m; and the highest lifted point in Thredbo at 2037m

The last establishment of a major skifield in NSW came with the development of Mount Blue Cow in the 1980s. In 1987 the Swiss designed Skitube Alpine Railway opened to deliver skiers from Bullocks Flat, on the Alpine Way, to Perisher Valley and to Blue Cow, which also opened in 1987. The operators of Blue Cow purchased Guthega in 1991, and the new combined resort later merged with Perisher-Smiggins to become the largest ski resort in the Southern Hemisphere. In 2009 Perisher had 48 lifts covering 1,245 hectares and four village base areas: Perisher Valley, Blue Cow, Smiggin Holes and Guthega.

== Competitive skiing ==
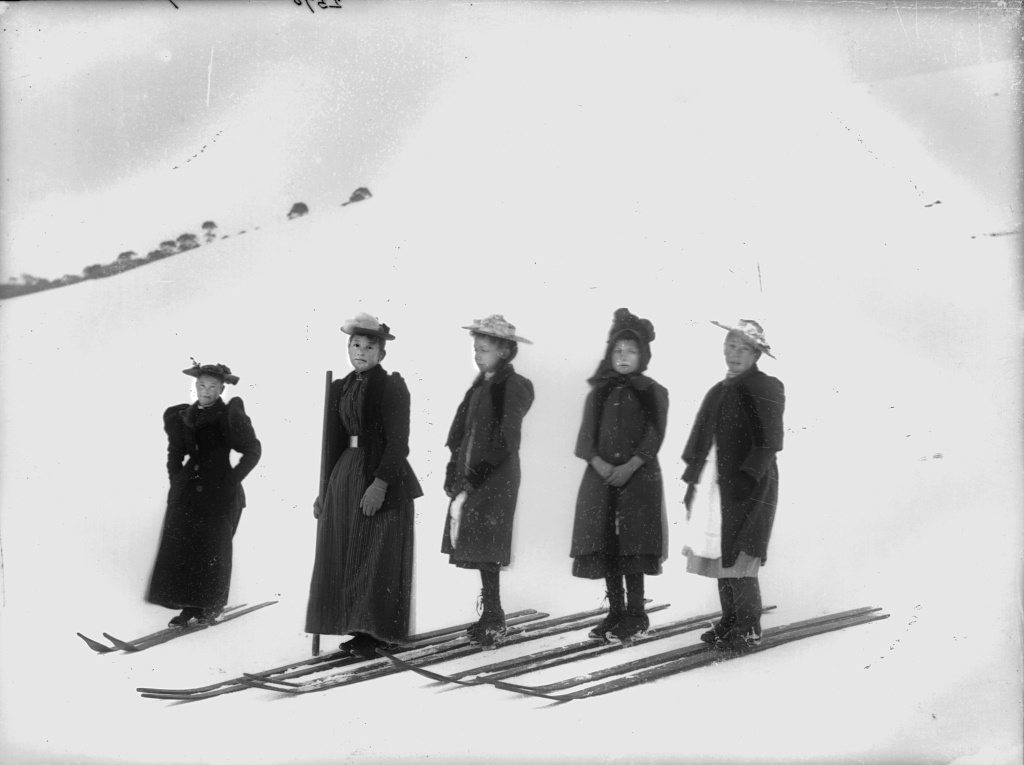
The Start of the Girls' Snowshoe Race, Kiandra c. 1900

Australia was a pioneer nation in the sport of ski racing, with annual ski races being conducted at Kiandra during the 19th Century. The Kiandra snow shoe club is easily one of the oldest ski clubs in the world. The club was formed around 1861 by three Norwegians, Elias Gottaas, Soren Torp and Carl Bjerknes on the Kiandra Gold Fields, NSW. This original Kiandra ski club is now recognised as the first snow ski club in the world, it also carries the distinction of being the longest continuously operating club. In 2006, the Holmenkollen Ski Museum confirmed that the first two ski clubs in the world were formed by Norwegians in 1861, "both in Australia and Norway".

Ski races were conducted from the 1860s onward and in 1908 the club held the world's first documented "International Ski Carnival". In addition to the International Downhill Race, events included races for boys under eight, ten, eleven and fourteen; boys and girls Open Championships were also conducted. The events concluded with a "New Chum" event and toboggan race.

The Federation Internationale de Ski calendar lists various alpine and cross country skiing, as well as snowboarding and moguls competitions in Australia during the month of August.

Australian skiers competed in the Winter Olympics for the first time in Oslo, 1952. Australian skiers have competed in all subsequent Winter Olympic Games and won medals at every Games since 1998.

The sport of snowboarding is also popular in the Australian skifields and Australia has been represented at the Olympics in this sport ever since it debuted at Nagano in 1998. Torah Bright, of the Snowy Mountains town of Cooma, New South Wales, won gold for Australia at the Vancouver Olympics in 2010 in the women's snowboard halfpipe event. Bright's gold medal – combined with the gold and silver skiing event medals – made 2010 Australia's most successful winter Olympic Games. The Australian team was the only Southern Hemisphere team to secure medals and was ranked 13th in the overall medal tally. Australia's two gold medals equalled the gold medal haul of former Winter Olympic host nation France and surpassed those of former host nations Italy, Japan and Croatia (in the Former Yugoslavia). A parodical bid for Australia to host the Olympic Games at Smiggin Holes was launched by satirical sports commentators Roy and HG during the Salt Lake City Olympics: see Smiggin Holes 2010 Winter Olympic bid.

== Cross country and back country skiing ==
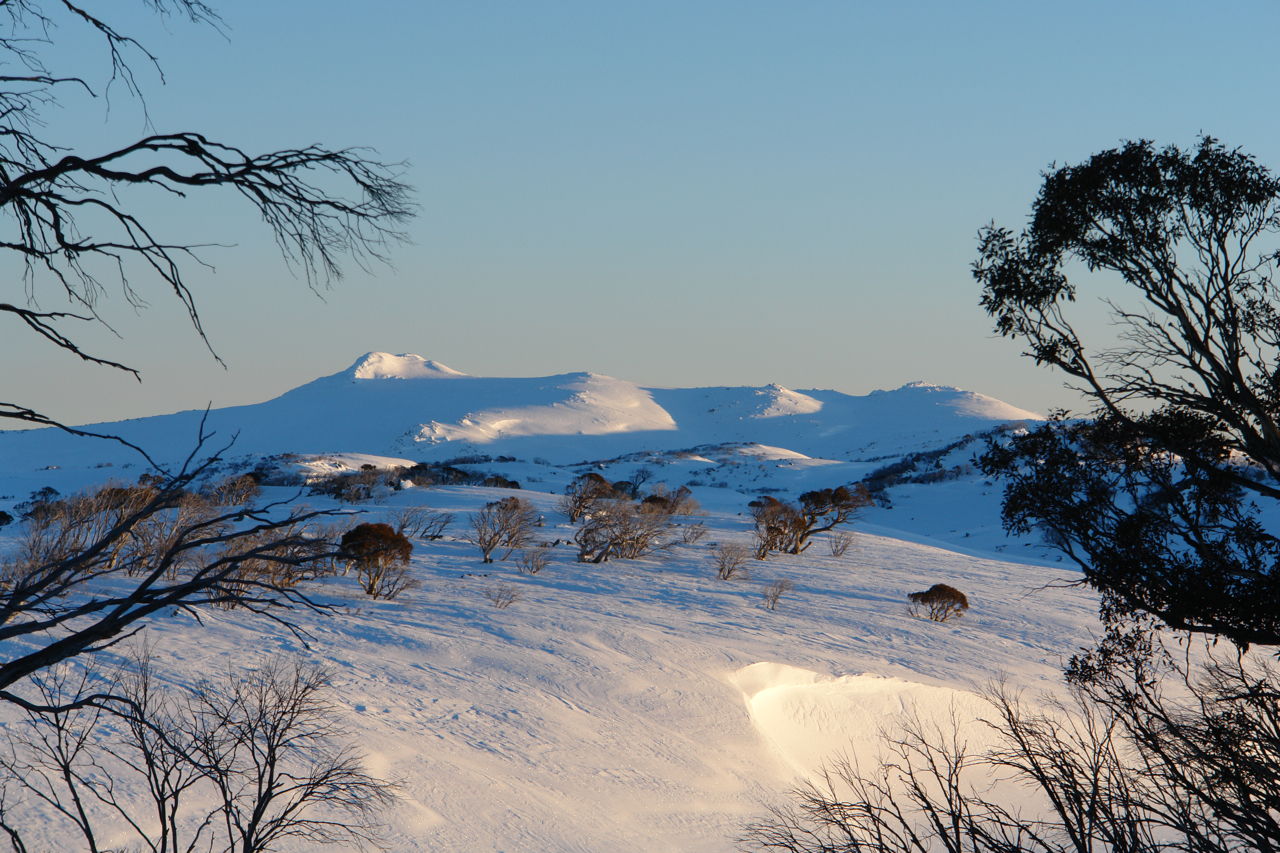
Sunrise over Mount Jagungal

The Kosciuszko Main Range in the Snowy Mountains of New South Wales offer some of the most challenging cross-country and back-country skiing in Australia, notably Watsons Crags and Mount Twynam on the steep Western Face of the Range. The Mount Jagungal wilderness area provides some of the most isolated back-country ski terrain. High country huts, often a legacy of the era of cattle grazing in the mountains, provide emergency shelter in these regions. Seaman's Hut, near Kosciuszko, was built as a refuge in 1929 to commemorate Laurie Seaman, who was separated from his party and died in a 1928 blizzard while attempting to cross-country ski to Mount Kosciuszko.

The Australian High Country is populated by unique flora and fauna including wombats, wallabies, echidnas, and the snow gum. The Alpine regions are subject to environmental protection, which has limited the scope of commercial development of skiiable terrain, however Australia has extensive cross country skiing terrain.

A landmark expedition in early Australian cross country skiing was conducted in 1927, when William Hughes, of the Kiandra Snow Shoe Club, together with four members of the Ski Club of Australia made the first historic ski traverse from Kiandra to the Hotel Kosciusko (now Sponars Chalet). Their eventful journey, via the Mount Jagungal Wilderness and across freezing rivers, is retold in Klaus Hueneke's book "Kiandra to Kosciusko" and was commemorated by 150 ski tourers in 1977 in an event organised by the Kosciuszko Huts Association.

== Snow conditions ==
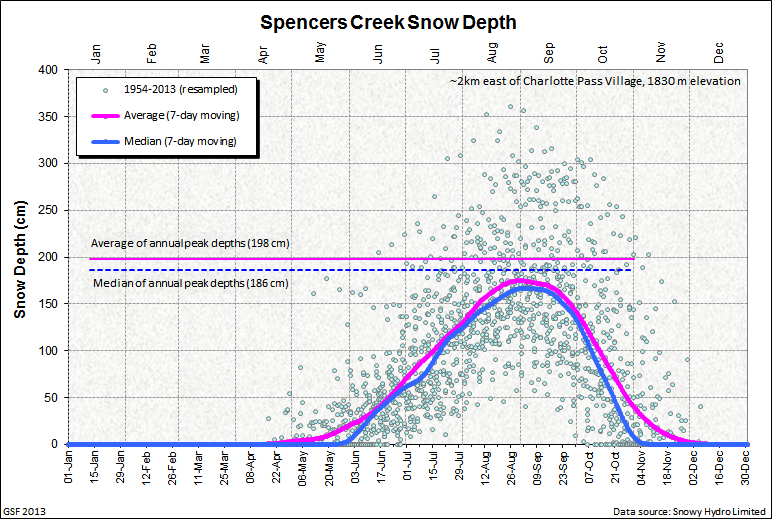
Spencers Creek average snow depth chart from Snowy Hydro

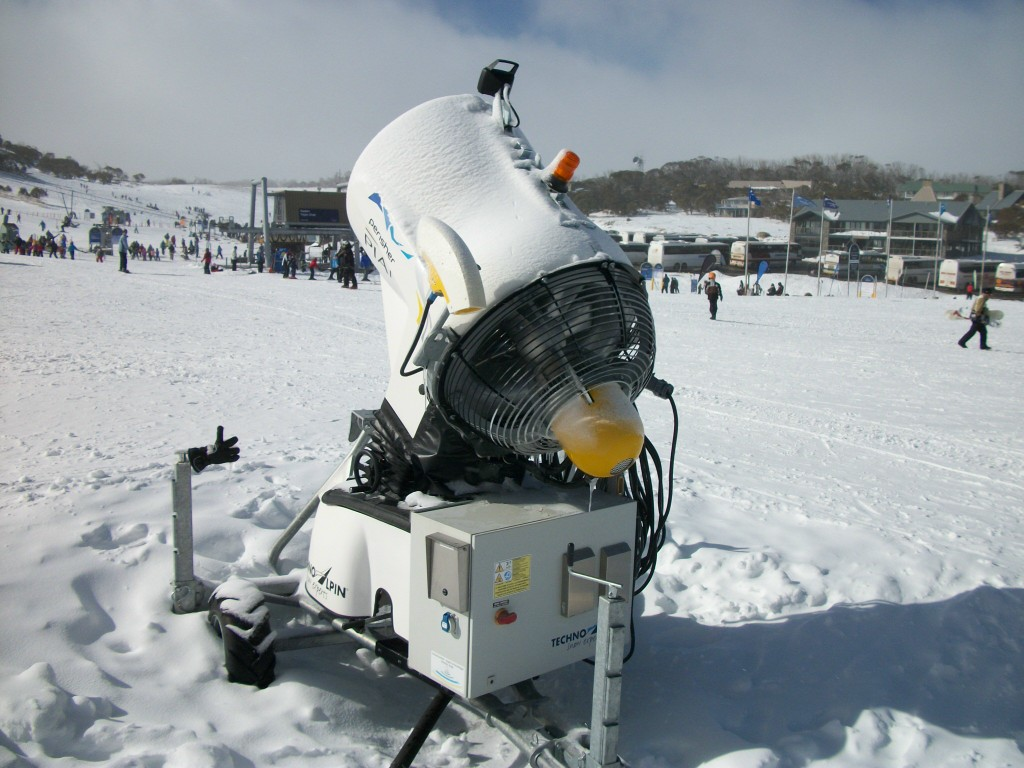
Snowmaking machine at Smiggin Holes, New South Wales

According to the Australian Government's "Bureau of Meteorology", in most years snow is sufficient above about 1500 metres to sustain a "viable ski industry". However, snow falls can vary greatly from year to year. In 1973 temperatures remained too warm, while in 1982 it was too dry for much of a snow season. However, some other years have abundant snow – the Bureau cites 1981 as an example. The unpredictability of Australian snow conditions was highlighted in 2006 when severe drought and a poor snow season gave way to a "White Christmas" and abundant snow falls in the alpine regions of New South Wales, Victoria and Tasmania and even a low altitude snow fall on 25 December in the Dandenong Ranges on Melbourne's north-eastern fringe. Snow-making equipment at ski resorts has reduced uncertainty in recent times. In New South Wales, a heavy natural snow season can see a base of up to 3.6 meters in August, at an elevation of 1830m at Spencer's Creek, (near Charlotte Pass) – see below chart. Typically, depths will be lower than this.

Low altitude and often heavy rain; as well as seasonal (early spring) dust storms in the Simpson Desert depositing red dust on the ranges (causing less UV reflection and therefore faster melting) keep the snow season relatively short (June-Oct). Heavy snow can fall however, at any time between April and December in the Australian High Country (see chart from Snowy Hydro). The official opening of the ski season for most resorts coincides with the King's Birthday Long Weekend on the second Monday in June.

== List of downhill ski resorts ==
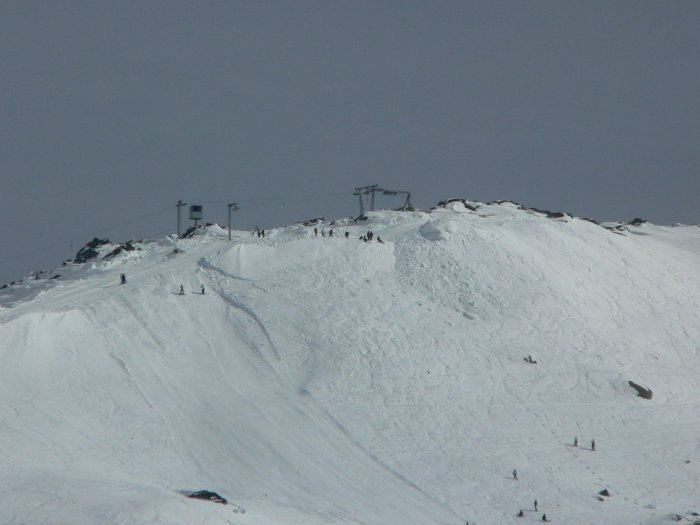
Olympic Ski Trail, leading to Perisher Valley from Back Perisher Mountain. Perisher is Australia's largest ski resort.

Alpine skiing:

- New South Wales
  - Thredbo
  - Perisher
    - Perisher Valley
    - Blue Cow Mountain
    - Guthega
    - Smiggin Holes
  - Selwyn Snowfields
  - Charlotte Pass

== List of cross country ski resorts and backcountry locations ==
- New South Wales:
  - Kosciuszko National Park
    - Jagungal Wilderness
    - Kiandra
    - Kosciuszko Main Range
  - Bimberi Nature Reserve

== Gallery ==
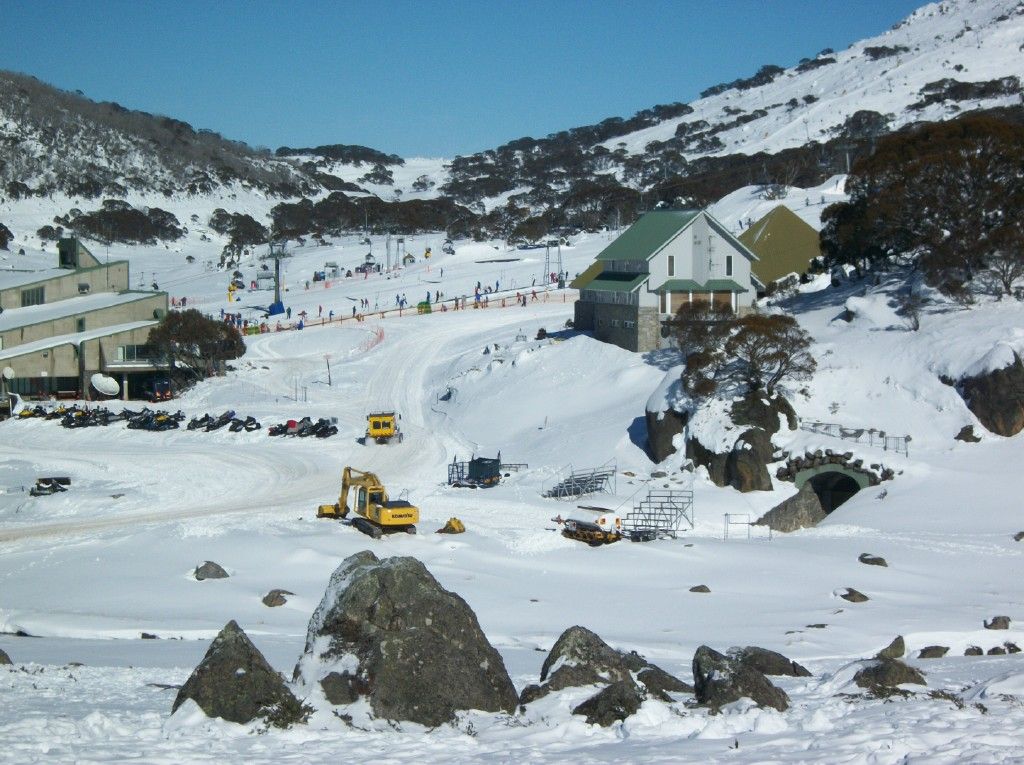
Perisher

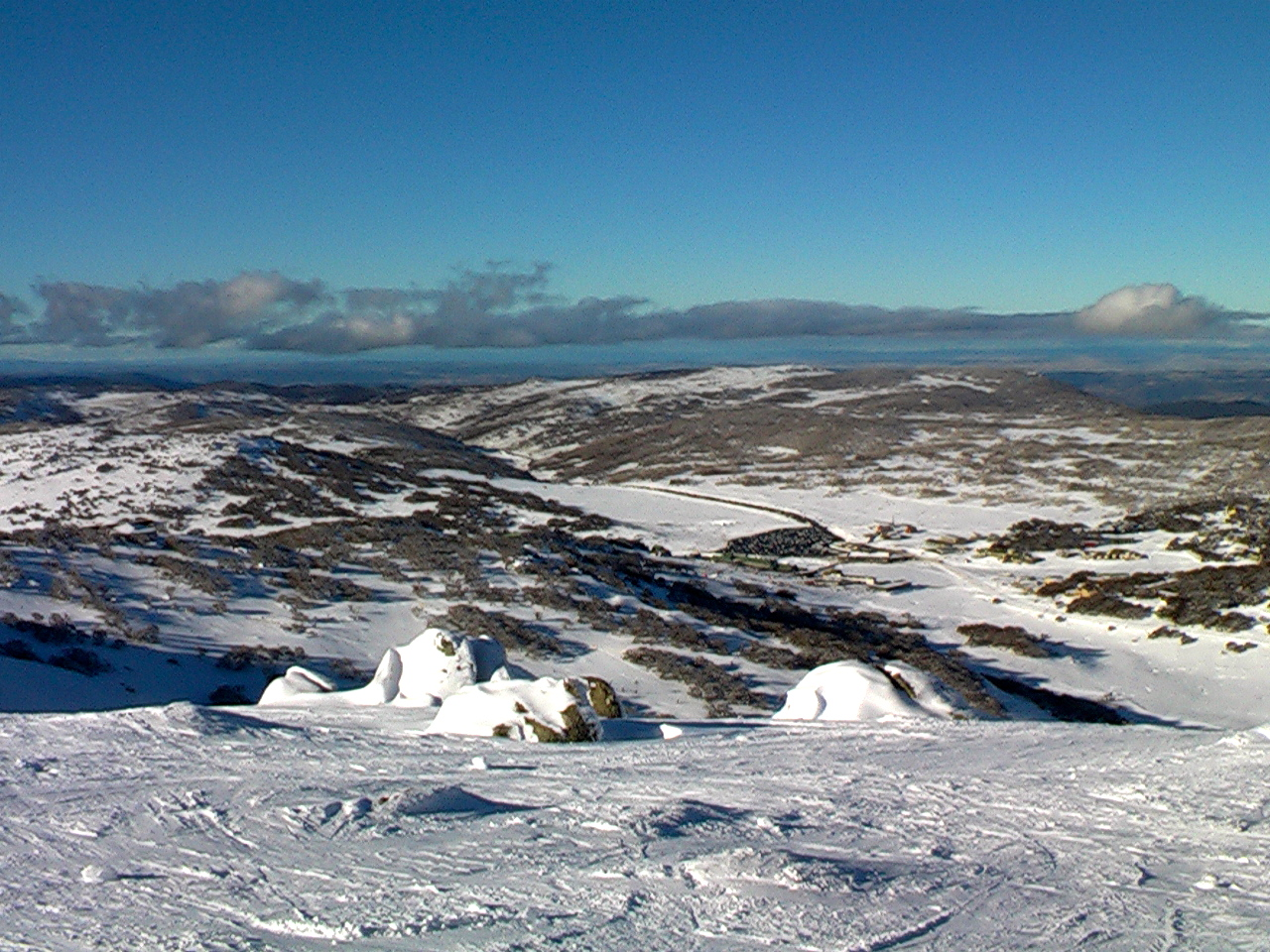
Perisher Valley from Mount Perisher

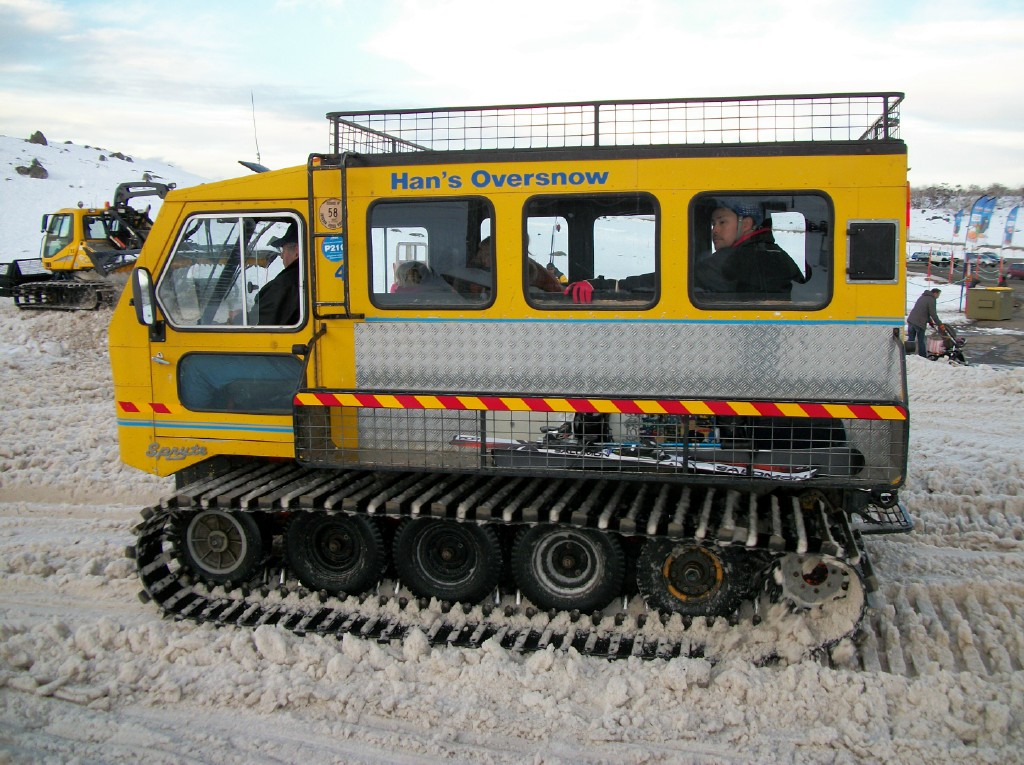
A Snowmobile at Perisher

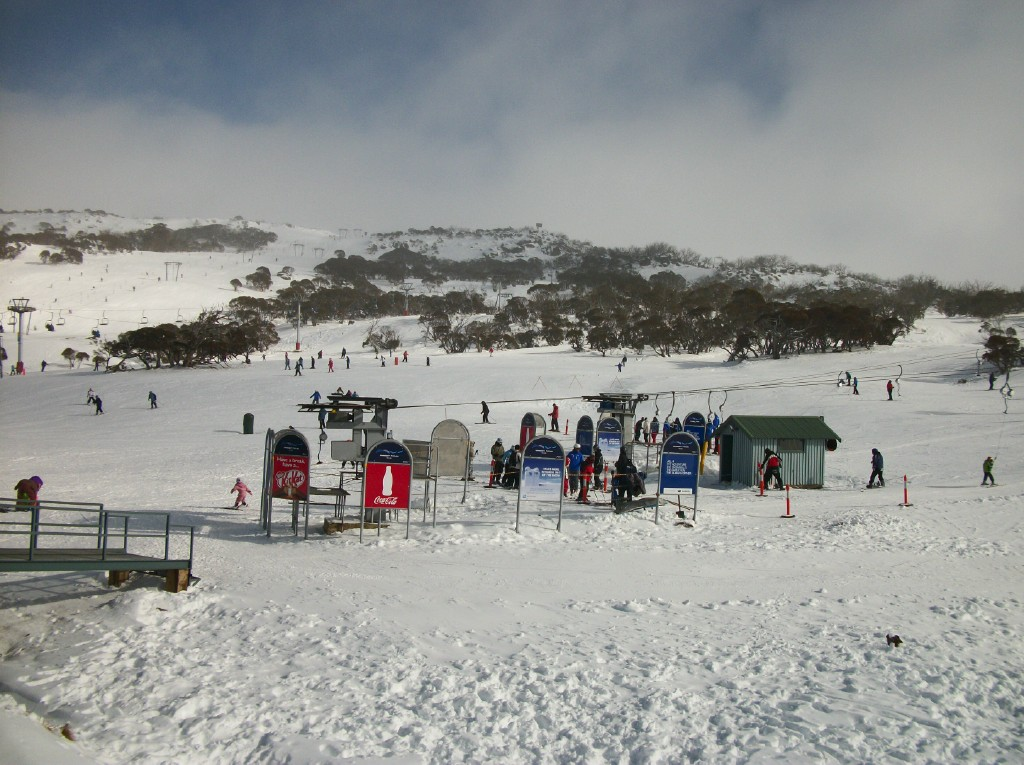
Smiggin Holes, Perisher

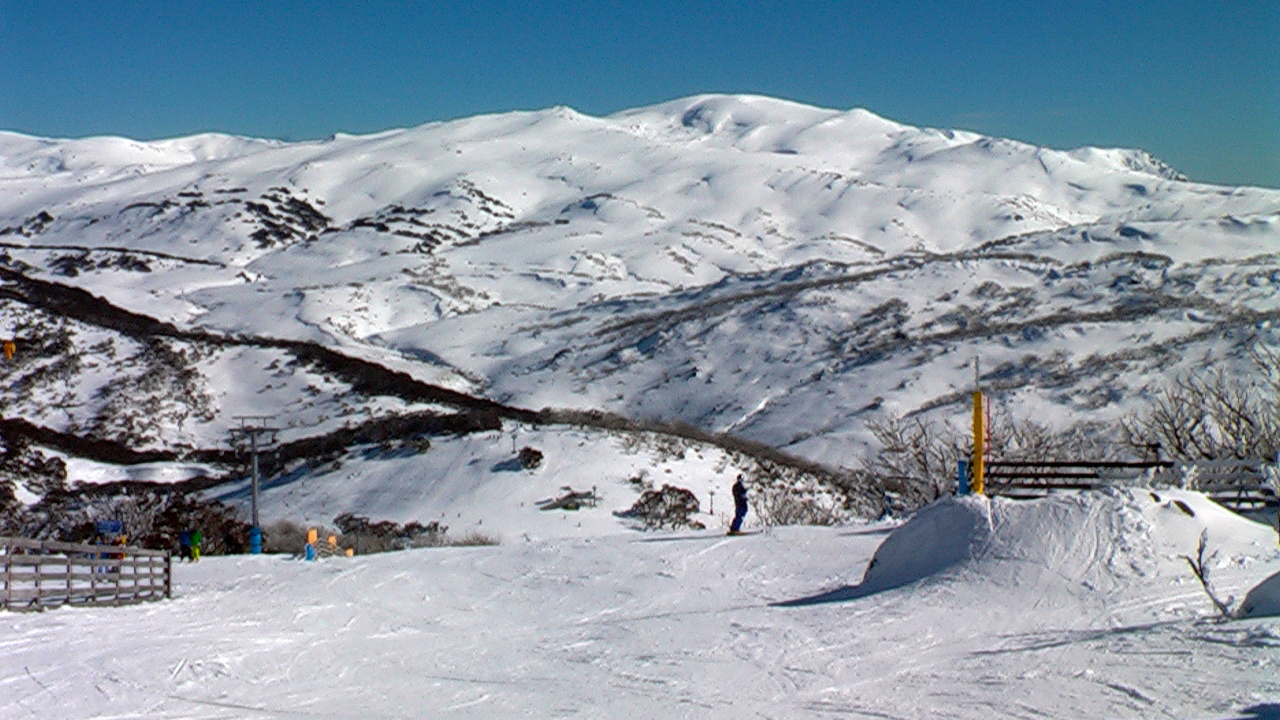
Guthega, Perisher

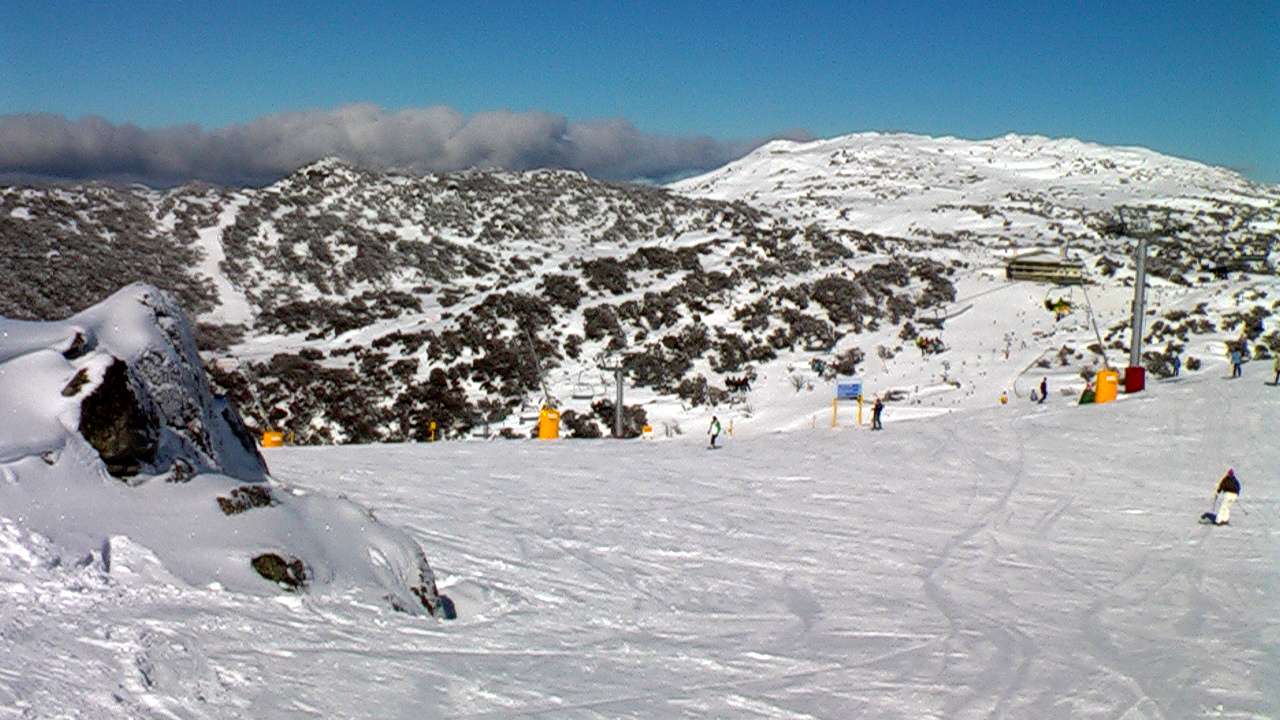
Looking to Blue Cow Terminal, Perisher

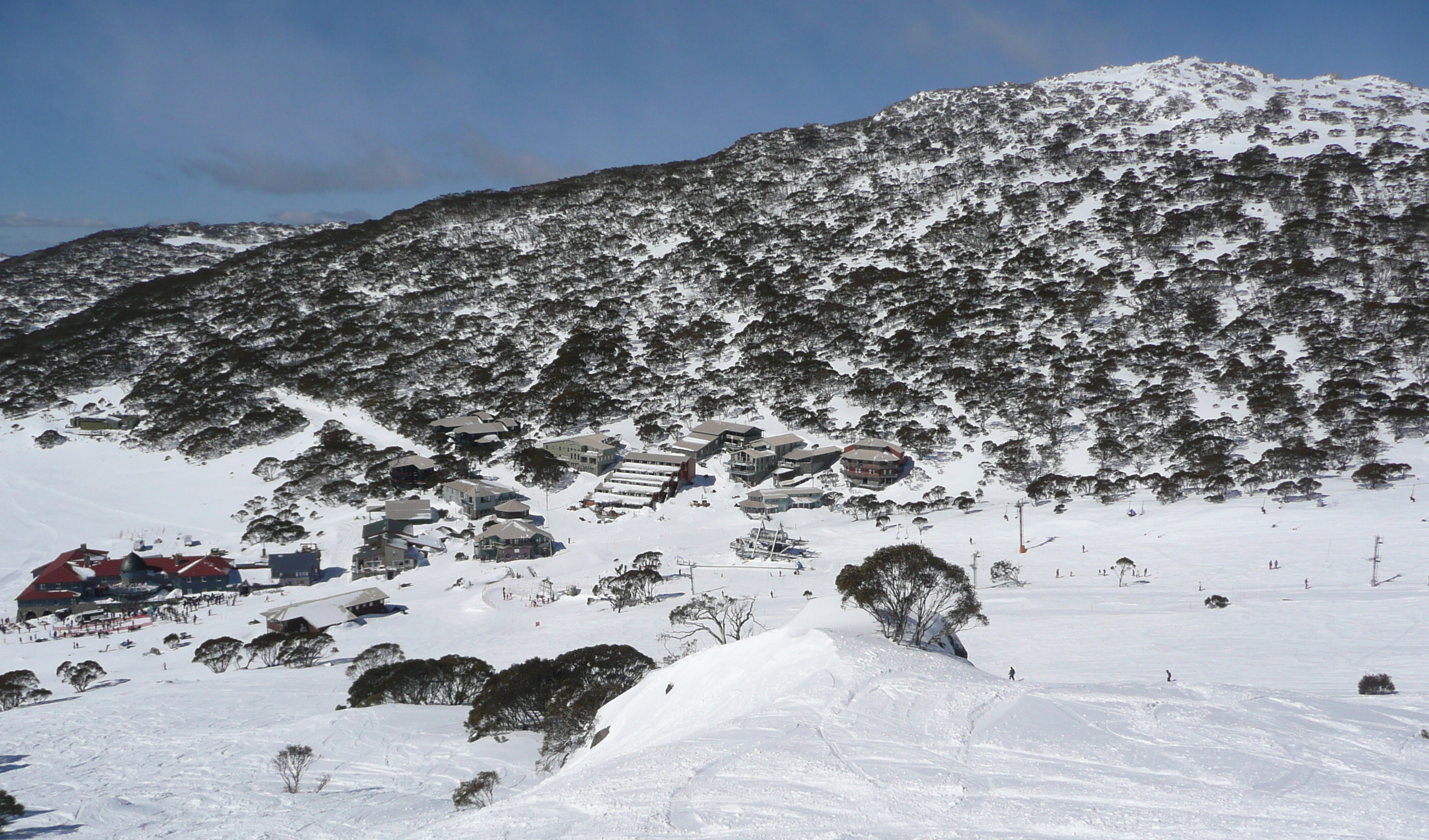
Charlotte Pass Village in August

Friday Flat, Thredbo

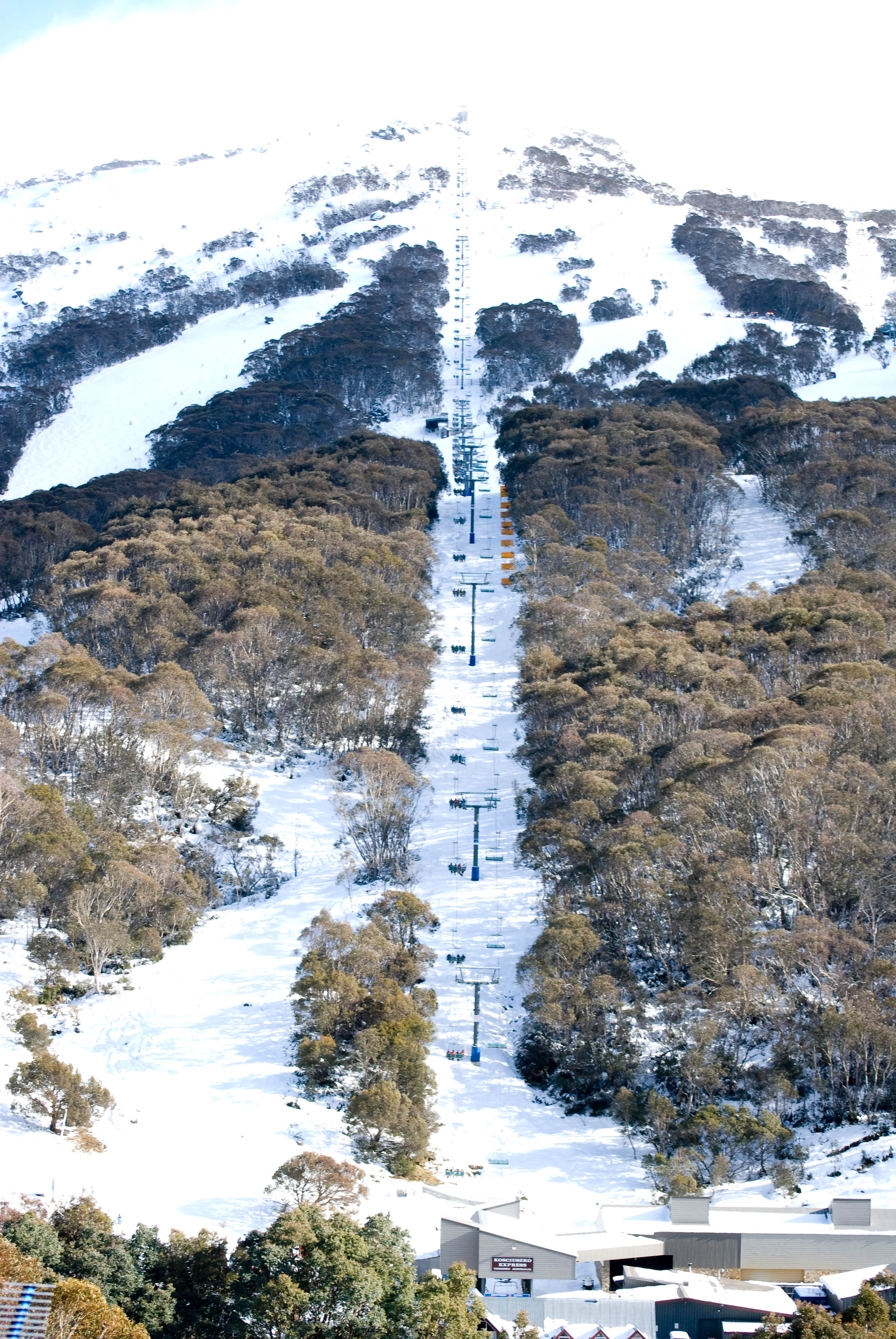
The Kosciuszko Express Chairlift, Thredbo

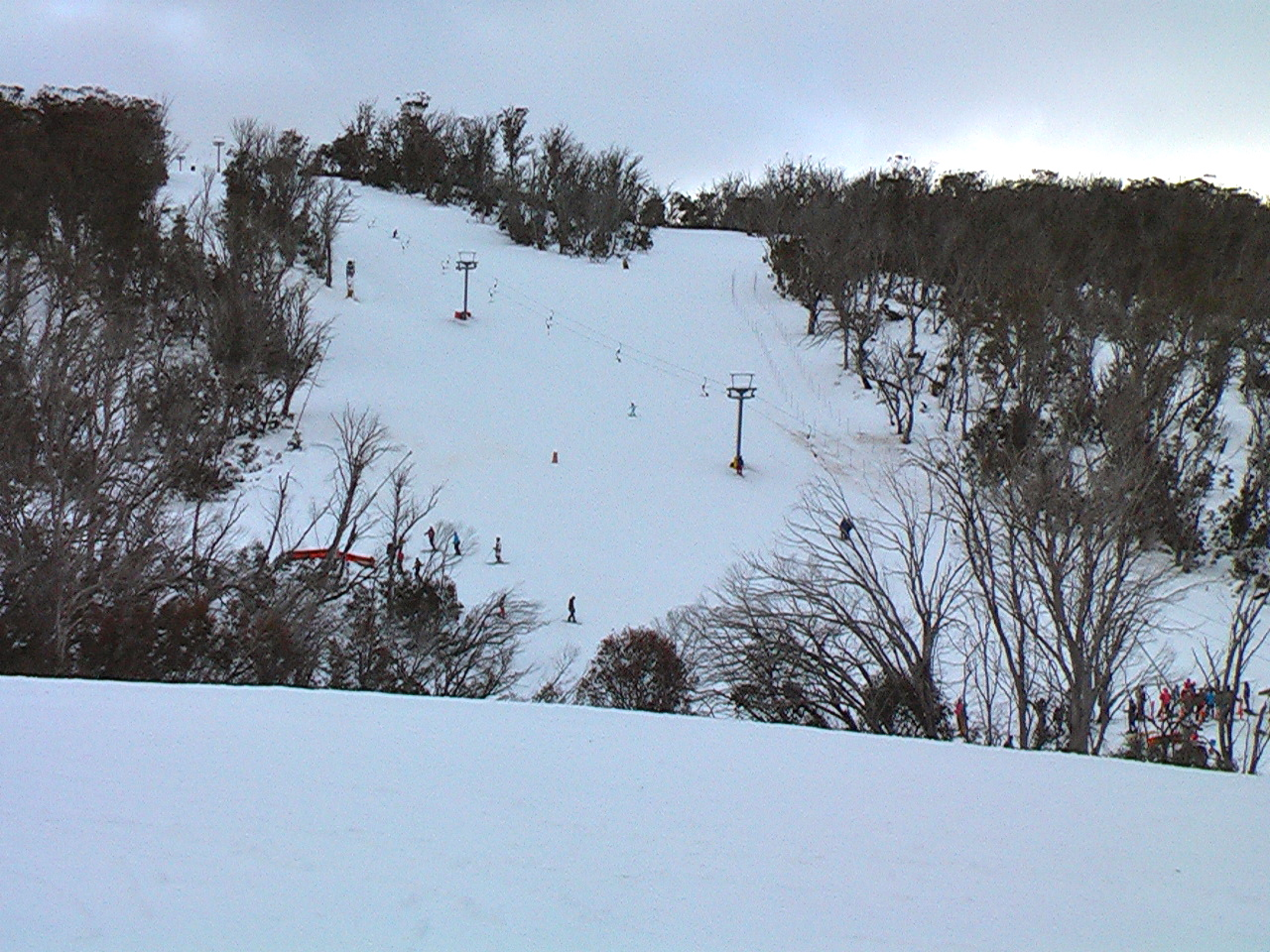
The Racecourse Run, Selwyn Snowfields

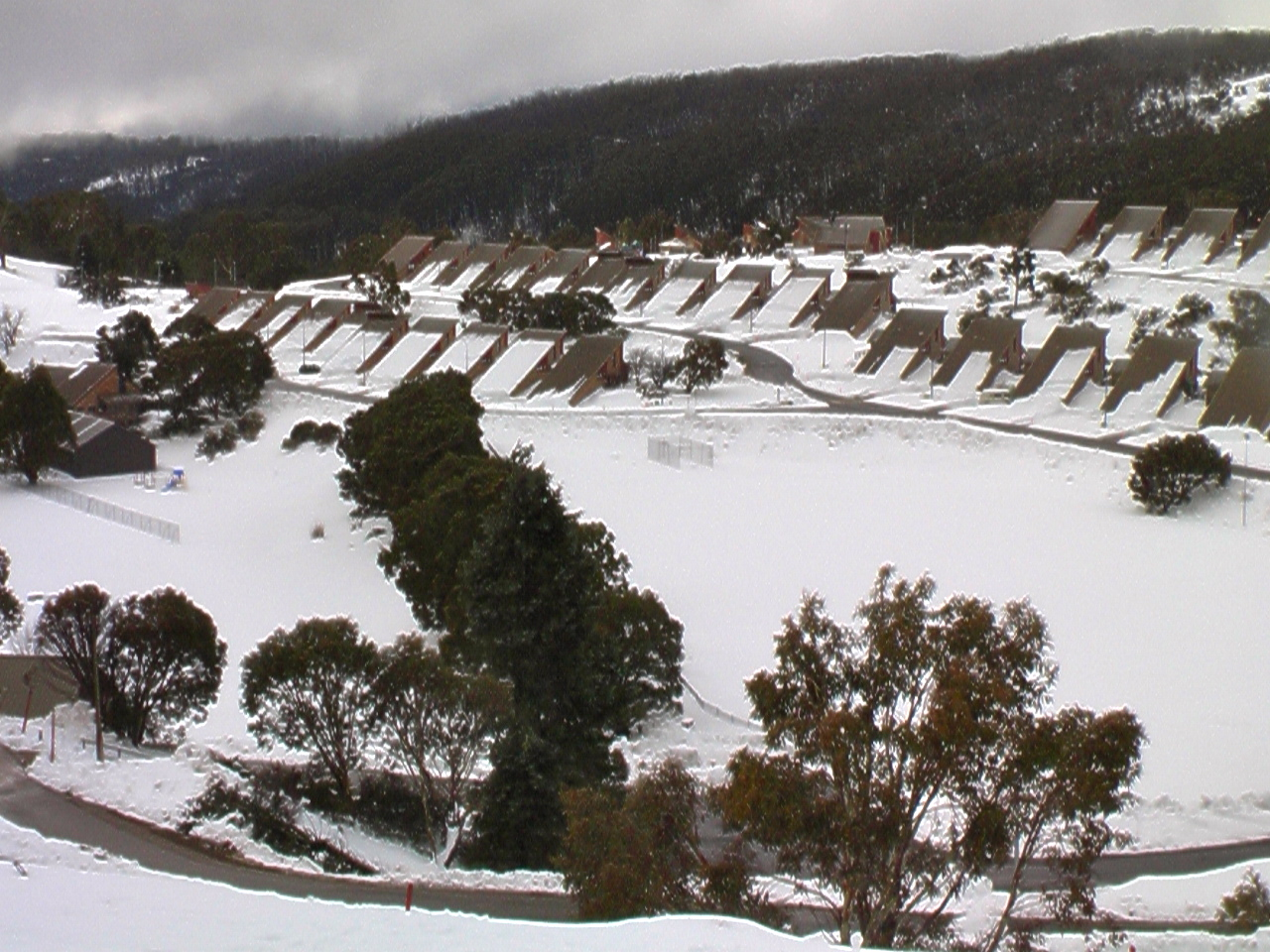
Cabramurra in July

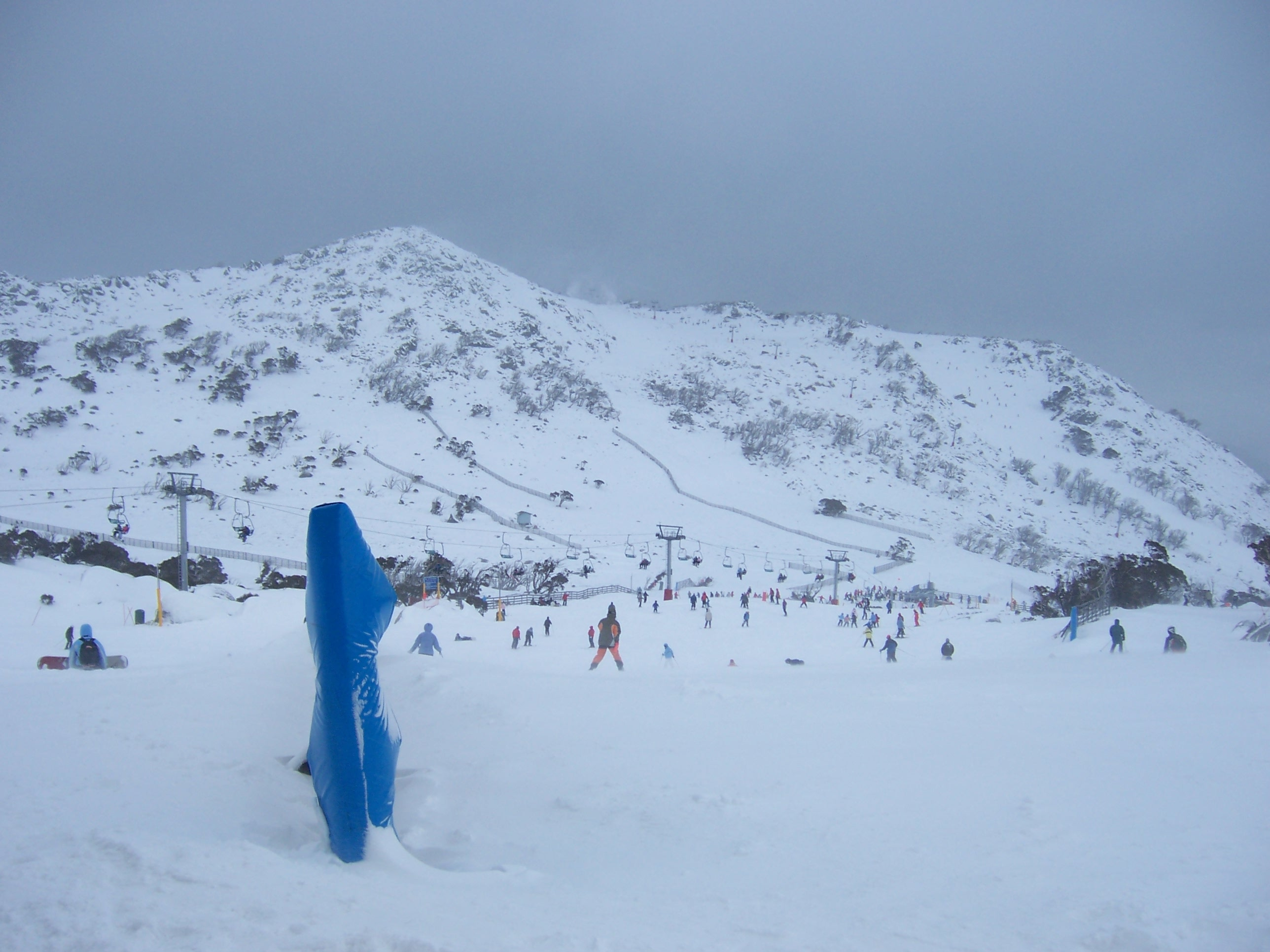
Perisher

== See also ==
- Skiing in Australia
- Skiing in Victoria, Australia
- Skiing in Tasmania
- Skiing in the Australian Capital Territory
- List of ski areas and resorts in Australia
- Winter sport in Australia
