= Sel (given name) =

Origin
- Region of origin: Australian

Sel is a masculine given name, a shortened form of other names, particularly Selwyn, and may refer to:

- Sel Belsham (1930–2016), New Zealand rugby league player
- Sel Hannah (1913–1991), American skier and ski-area architect
- Sel Lisle (1921–1999), Australian rugby league player
- Sel Murray (born 1917), Australian rules footballer
