= Selwyn Snow Resort =

Ski resort in New South Wales, Australia

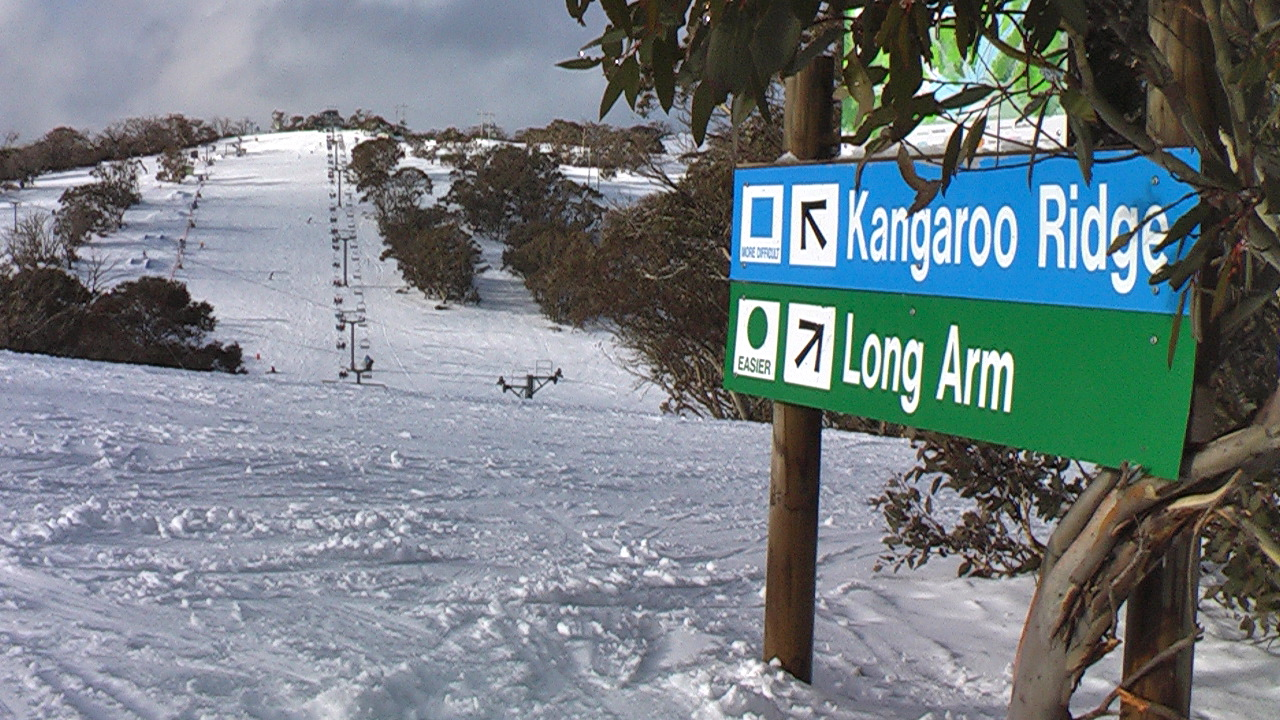
- The Township Triple Chair at Selwyn Snow Resort, winter 2011.
- Interactive map of Selwyn Snow Resort
- Location: Snowy Mountains, New South Wales, Australia
- Nearest city: Canberra
- Coordinates: 35°54′30″S 148°27′00″E
- Vertical: 122 metres (400 ft)
- Top elevation: 1,614 metres (5,295 ft)
- Base elevation: 1,492 metres (4,895 ft)
- Skiable area: 45 hectares (110 acres)
- Longest run: Long Arm Run, 800 metres (2,600 ft)
- Lift system: 8 lifts
- Terrain parks: Yes
- Snowmaking: 35 hectares (86 acres)
- Night skiing: No
- Website: www.selwynsnow.com.au

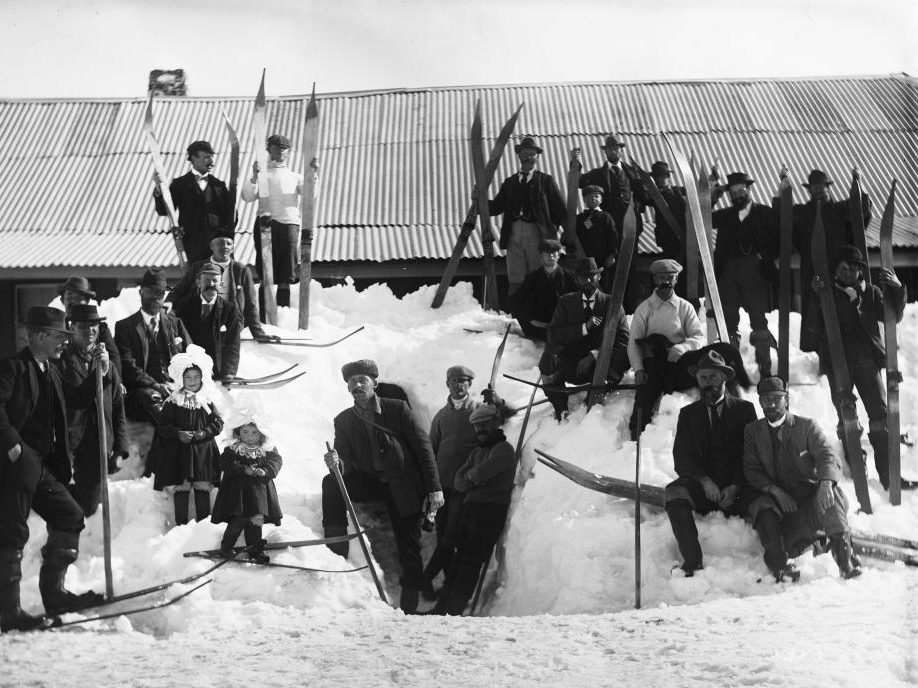
Selwyn traces its origins to nearby Kiandra, where skiing began in Australia in 1861.

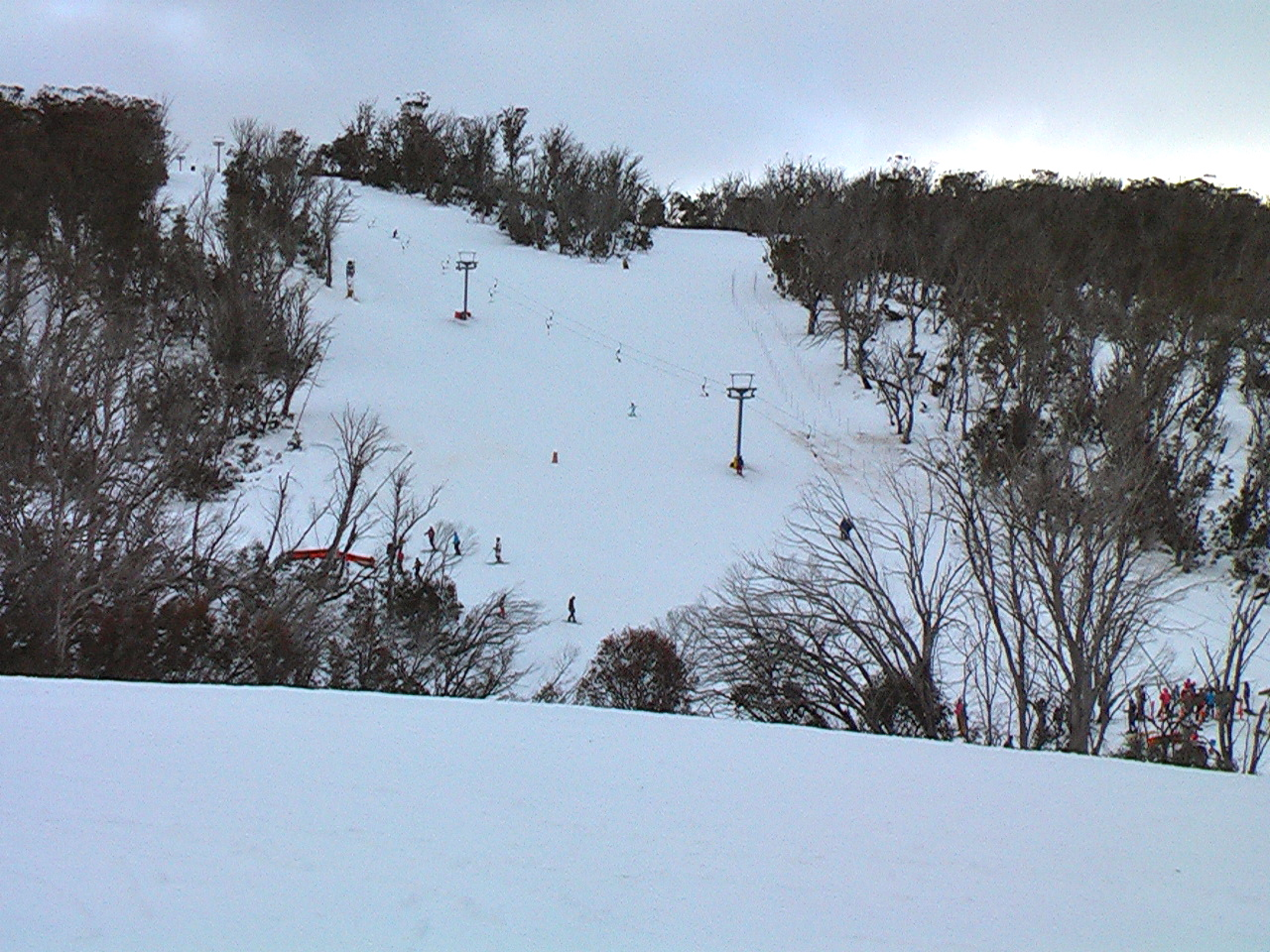
View to Racecourse Run from Kangaroo Ridge Run.

Selwyn Snow Resort, formerly known as Selwyn Snowfields, is a ski resort located in the most northern part of the Snowy Mountains of New South Wales, Australia, in the Snowy Monaro Regional Council and Kosciuszko National Park. Selwyn Snow Resort is located near the town of Adaminaby and is close to Cabramurra, which is the highest town in Australia.

Selwyn is owned by Blyton Group, which also owns Charlotte Pass Snow Resort. It reopened on the 10th of June 2023. Selwyn Snow Resort announced in November 2024, the appointment of their new General Manager, Abigail Spackman, who grew up skiing at Selwyn Snow Resort.

== History ==
Selwyn Snow Resort traces its origins to the skifields at nearby Kiandra, where skiing began in Australia around 1861. The more reliable snow cover at Selwyn saw the establishment of a portable rope tow on what is now the Township Run in 1966. The remaining ski facilities at Kiandra were finally transferred to Selwyn in 1978 (including Australia's first T-Bar, which had been installed at Kiandra in 1957). In 2009 a triple chairlift finally replaced the duplex T-Bars on the Township Run at Selwyn Snow Resort. During the 2019-2020 bushfire season the Snowfields building and equipment was heavily impacted and damaged.

== Resort Statistics ==
Selwyn Snow Resort is the most northerly of Australia's ski resorts with a base elevation of 1,492 metres (4,895 ft) and a top elevation of 1,614 metres (5,295 ft) AHD. The longest run at Selwyn Snow Resort is the 800 metres (2,600 ft) Long Arm Run.

Lifts as of 2023
Selwyn Snow Resort Lift:	Type:
Township Triple	Chairlift
New Chum Double	Chairlift
Wombat	T-Bar
Race Course	T-Bar
Powerline	Poma
Boomerang	Platter
Wes' Wonderful	Magic carpet
Toboggan Park	Magic carpet

For the winter of 2023, Selwyn Snow Resort comprised 45 hectares (110 acres), with 8 lifts including two chair lifts, two t-bars, two carpets, a platter and a Poma. The resort also advertises 45 kilometres (28 mi) of marked cross country trails. Selwyn is well suited to families and first timers, with 88% of terrain catering to beginners and intermediates, however the steeper gradient of the Racecourse Run provides some more challenging terrain for advanced skiers and boarders. In 2007 some terrain park features were added to the blue run known as Township.

A relatively low altitude means that the resort can have trouble maintaining a good natural snow cover during the very early and the latest stages of the ski season (June and September). The resort has developed extensive snowmaking facilities to combat this problem. This includes state of the art Lenko System, and the newer TT10 system from TechnoAlpin which can produce snow a two degrees warmer than the previous system, with a virtually inexhaustible supply of water from nearby Three Mile Dam that services the resort. Thirty-five hectares (86 acres) are today covered by snow-making and Selwyn Snow Resort is often the first New South Wales ski resort to advertise "100% access" to the mountain. Gentle, grassy terrain makes it easier for Selwyn Snow Resort to open its runs on a thinner snow cover than is the case at the higher, rockier resorts further south.

== Nearest accommodation ==
There is no public accommodation available at Selwyn Snow Resort. Winter access to the resort is via the Snowy Mountains Highway, from Talbingo in the west or Adaminaby in the east. No guest accommodation is provided at nearby Cabramurra as it is closed to the public due to the 2019-2020 bushfires. The closest major tourist accommodation is at the holiday village of Providence Portal on the upper reaches of Lake Eucumbene between Adaminaby and Kiandra. Many visitors also choose to stay at Adaminaby, Talbingo and Cooma.

Wolgal Hut at Kiandra was re-opened in 2012 for public accommodation as part of the rejuvenation of Kiandra by NSW National Parks & Wildlife Service. The ski and fishing hut was built in the 1960s and is located close to the foot of the original Kiandra ski slopes. It is one of the four remaining historic buildings of the abandoned gold rush town which have been the subject of restoration work.

== 2020 Bushfires ==
In January 2020 bushfires in the region burnt through the resort, with pictures provided by the NSW National Parks & Wildlife Service showing widespread destruction. All of the resort's buildings were reportedly destroyed or severely damaged. However, as the resort had been previously evacuated no loss of life was reported.

== See also ==
- Skiing in Australia
- Skiing in New South Wales
- Kiandra
