= Selwyn, West Virginia =

- Unincorporated community
- Location within the state of West Virginia Selwyn, West Virginia (the United States)
- Coordinates: 37°51′31″N 82°22′43″W
- Country: United States
- State: West Virginia
- County: Mingo
- Elevation: 614 ft (187 m)
- Time zone: UTC-5 (Eastern (EST))
  - Summer (DST): UTC-4 (EDT)
- GNIS ID: 1546563

Selwyn is an unincorporated community in Mingo County, West Virginia, United States. Its post office has been closed.
