= HNoMS Sel =

Three ships of the Royal Norwegian Navy have borne the name HNoMS Sel or Sæl (archaic spelling), after the Pinniped:

- HNoMS Sæl was a 1.-class torpedo boat launched in 1901, she was sunk in action with the German Kriegsmarine during the 1940 Norwegian Campaign.
- HNoMS Sel (P950) was the former US Navy Elco-class boat PT-603, received as aid in 1951.
- HNoMS Sel (P382) was a Tjeld-class motor torpedo boat launched in 1963 and sold for scrapping in 1981.
