= Selwyn (name) =

Selwyn is a given name and surname.

It may have originated from the Middle English personal name Selewyne, and from the Old English personal name Seleƿine, putting together the words sele ("hall") and ƿine ("friend") or "sea friend". Other research indicates a French origin, from Salvagin, meaning "wild person", introduced during the Norman Conquest, and may well have been used as a joke, meaning someone who was the opposite of wild. It may have come from the Latin Silvanus or Salvin, a Roman clan name connected to the God of the Forest.

== Surname ==
- Alfred Richard Cecil Selwyn (1824–1902), British geologist who surveyed parts of Australia and Canada
- Archibald Selwyn (1877–1959), American theatrical producer
- Charles Jasper Selwyn (1813–1869), Judge, Lord Justice, M.P. and privy counsellor
- Charles William Selwyn (1858–1893), British army officer and Conservative politician
- Don Selwyn (c. 1936–2007), Maori actor and film director from New Zealand
- Edgar Selwyn (1875–1944), American film director and theatrical producer
- George Selwyn (Bishop of New Zealand) (1809–1878)
- George Selwyn (politician) (1719–1791), English politician and wit
- George Selwyn (bishop of Tinnevelly) (1887–1957), Missionary bishop in South India
- John Richardson Selwyn (1844–1898), Second bishop of Melanesia
- Sydney Selwyn (1934–1996), British physician, medical scientist and notable expert in the history of medicine.
- Tim Selwyn (born 1974), New Zealand political activist who was tried for sedition
- Victor Selwyn (1917–2005), British journalist
- William Selwyn (1655–1702), officer in the British Army, MP and briefly Governor of Jamaica
- William Marshall Selwyn (1879–1951), Bishop of Fulham, Archdeacon of Bath and Rector of Bath Abbey
- Zachariah Selwyn (born 1975), American TV personality

== Given name ==
=== People ===
- Selwyn Baker (1911–1996), Australian rules footballer
- Selwyn Baptiste (1936–2012), Trinidadian-British musician
- Selwyn Bean (1886–1981), Archdeacon of Manchester, 1934–66
- Selwyn Biggs (1872–1943), Welsh rugby union player
- Selwyn Birchwood (born 1985), American blues guitarist
- Selwyn Blackmore (born 1972), New Zealand cricketer
- Selwyn G. Blaylock (1879–1945), Canadian businessman
- Selwyn Z. Bowman (1840–1928), U.S. Representative from Massachusetts
- Selwyn Brown (musician) (born 1958), British roots reggae musician
- Selwyn Closs-Parry (1925–2015), Archdeacon of St Asaph, 1984–90
- Selwyn Cudjoe (born 1943), Trinidadian academic and historian
- Selwyn Dewdney (1909–1979), Canadian author, illustrator, artist and activist
- Selwyn Edge (1868–1940), Australian businessman and racing car driver
- Selwyn Fernandes (born 1980), Indian footballer
- Selwyn Fremantle (1869–1942), British administrator in India
- Selwyn Griffith (1928–2011), Welsh poet
- Selwyn Hughes (1928–2006), British Christian minister
- Selwyn Image (1849–1930), British academic
- Selwyn Jepson (1899–1989), British author
- Selwyn Jones (born 1970), American football player
- Selwyn George (Bill) Lane (1922–2000), Australian ornithologist
- Selwyn Lloyd (1904–1978), British Conservative politician
- Selwyn Lymon (born 1986), American football wide receiver
- Selwyn Maister (born 1946), New Zealand field hockey player
- Selwyn N. Owen (1836–1916), American jurist
- Selwyn Porter (1905–1963), Australian Army officer
- Selwyn Raab (1934–2025), American author and journalist
- Selwyn Richardson (1935–1995), Trinidadian lawyer
- Selwyn Riumana (born 1966), Solomon Islander politician
- Selwyn Pretorius (born 1982), known as Selwyn (singer), Australian R&B singer
- Selwyn Selwyn-Clarke (1893–1976), British doctor and barrister
- Selwyn Toogood (1916–2001), New Zealand television personality
- Selwyn Whalley (1934–2008), English footballer
- Selwyn Walford Young (1899–1977), Belizean musician and composer
- Selwyn Wright (1934–2015), British physicist and engineer

=== Fictional characters ===
- Selwyn Froggitt, main character in the British sitcom Oh No It's Selwyn Froggitt
- Selwyn Kane, main antagonist/secondary protagonist/love interest of the book series The Legendborn Cycle
