= Mauve leek orchid =

Mauve leek orchid is a common name for several plants and may refer to:

- Prasophyllum alpestre
- Prasophyllum suttonii
