= Mount Stilwell =

Mountain in New South Wales, Australia

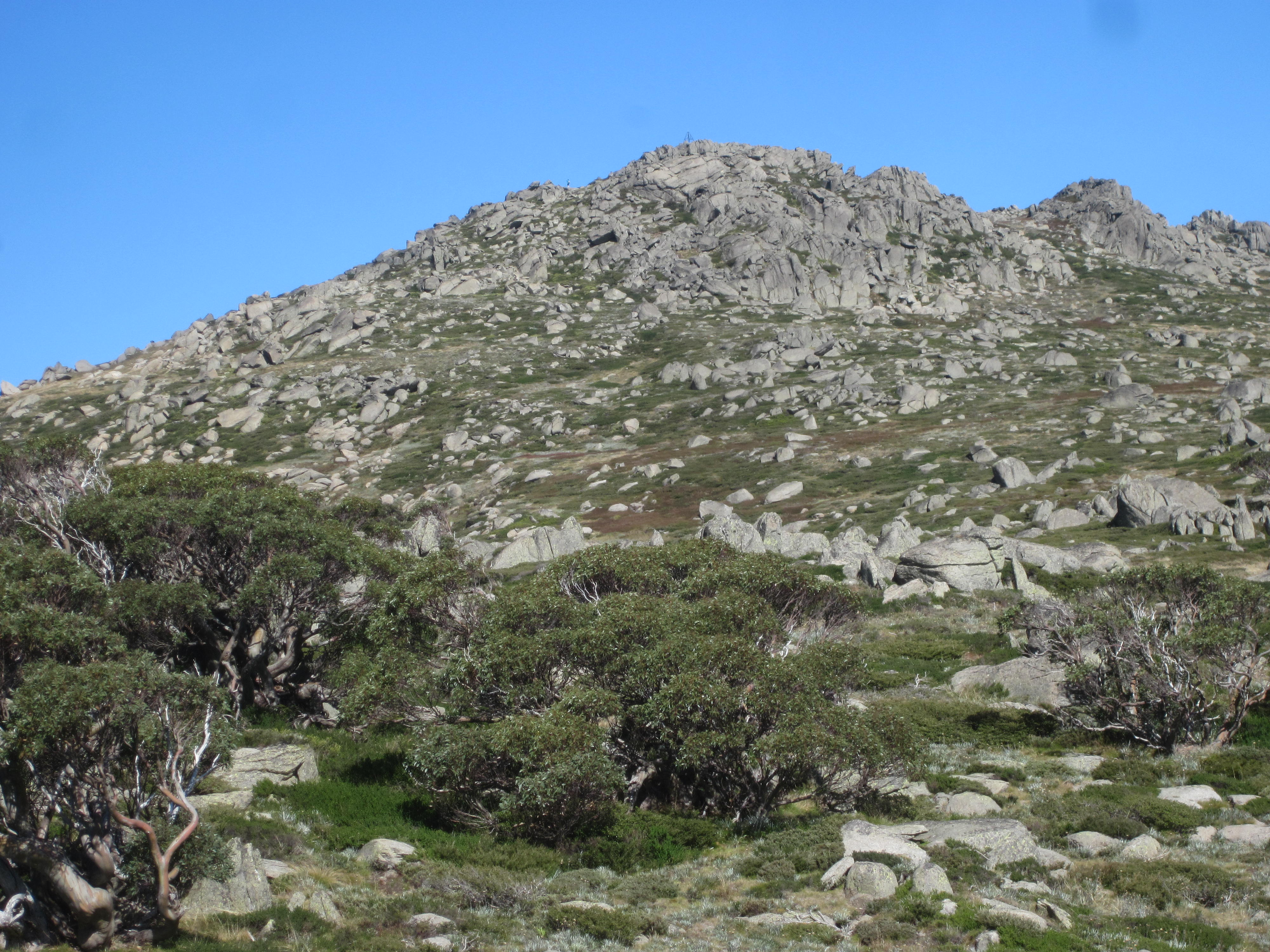

Highest point
- Elevation: 2,054 m (6,739 ft)
- Prominence: 16 m (52 ft)
- Coordinates: 36°26′50″S 148°19′27″E

Naming
- Etymology: Frank Leslie Stillwell

Geography
- Location within New South Wales
- Location: Snowy Mountains, New South Wales, Australia
- Parent range: Main Range, Great Dividing Range

Mount Stilwell is a mountain 2,054m (6,739ft) above sea level, in the Great Dividing Range in Australia. It is located on the Main Range of the Snowy Mountains in Kosciuszko National Park, part of the Australian Alps National Parks and Reserves, in New South Wales, Australia, and is located about 1.5 kilometres from the end of the Kosciuszko Road at Charlotte Pass.

It has been suggested that Mount Stilwell was named after geologist Frank Leslie Stillwell however no evidence for this can be found and the mountain is officially spelled "Stilwell".

There is a trig station on the mountain which was erected in 1952.

The Mount Stilwell Walk commences to the left of the toilet block at Charlotte Pass and ends at the summit of the mountain. From the peak there are views of the rocky peaks of Kosciuszko National Park's Main Range.
