= Patricia Finlayson =

Australian ski champion and instructor

Patsy Finlayson
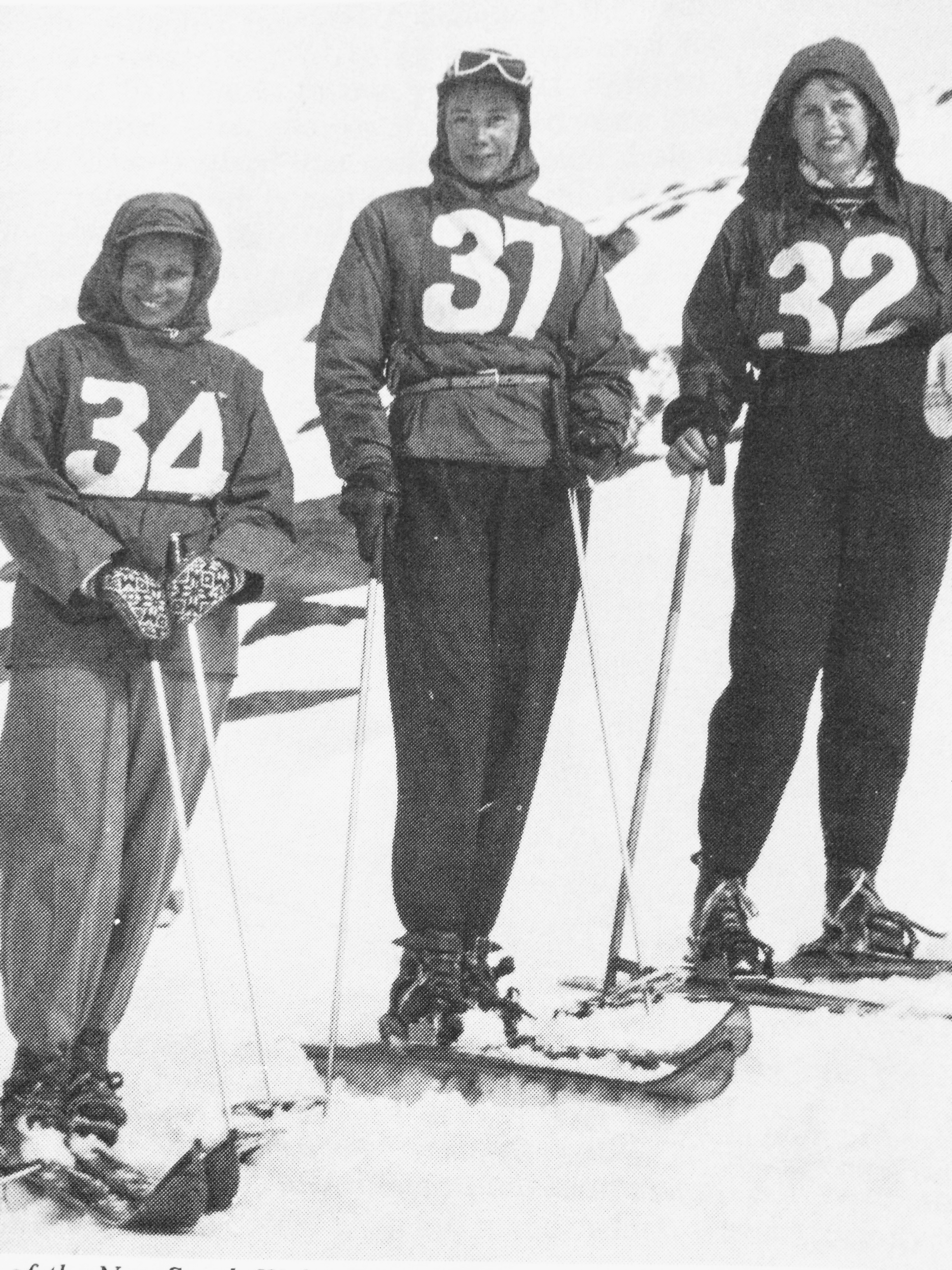
- Patsy Finlayson (middle) with NSW Ski Team in 1950

Personal information
- Full name: Patricia Sydney Russell Finlayson
- Born: 17 March 1915 Sydney, New South Wales, Australia
- Died: 27 May 1997 (aged 82) Gunnedah, New South Wales, Australia

Sport
- Sport: Skiing
- Sports career
Medal record
Women's alpine skiing
Australian Ski Championship
Gold medal – first place	1935	Combined
Silver medal – second place	1935	Slalom
Silver medal – second place	1935	Giant slalom
	1938	Men's slalom
Gold medal – first place	1939	Combined
Gold medal – first place	1939	Slalom
Gold medal – first place	1939	Giant slalom
Gold medal – first place	1949	Combined
Gold medal – first place	1949	Slalom
Gold medal – first place	1949	Giant slalom
Gold medal – first place	1950	Combined
Gold medal – first place	1950	Slalom
Gold medal – first place	1950	Giant slalom

Patricia Sydney Russell Finlayson (17 March 1915 – 27 May 1997), was four times Australian Ski Champion and Australia's first female ski instructor.

== Background ==
Patricia Finlayson (known as "Patsy") was born at the family home "Vange" in Bellevue Hill, Sydney, New South Wales. She attended school boarding school at Ascham in Sydney and Frensham in Bowral. She excelled in numerous sports including hockey, horse riding, polocrosse and athletics. She was also an excellent water colour painter, doing mainly rural landscapes. Finlayson was introduced to skiing by her eldest sister Joyce, who had been skiing since the late 1920s and was a founding member of the Australian Women's Ski Club (AWSC) in 1932. Finlayson thrived under the instruction of Ernst Skardarasy (the first overseas ski instructor brought to Australia in 1935).

Finlayson's father, Commander John Francis Finlayson served in both the Royal Navy and Royal Australian Navy during WW1 aboard HMAS Sydney. Her grandfather Sir John Russell French was the general manager of the Bank of New South Wales.

== 1935 Australian Ski Championships ==
At age 20, Finlayson was selected to the NSW Ski team and competed at the Australian Championships. Her sister Joyce was also a member of the NSW Ski team. Patsy was runner-up in the individual slalom and giant slalom and became the Australian combined champion. She was also awarded the Collins Cup for jumping and racing.

== 1935 Summit Ski Race ==
This was a grueling 56 km cross country ski race from the Hotel Kosciuszko to Mt Kosciuszko summit and back. The route began at the Hotel Kosciusko and followed the Kosciuszko Road up to Charlotte Pass. From there some competitors continued along the road whilst the better skiers took a diagonal run up the Snowy Valley to the summit of Mt Kosciuszko. After taking a photo at the summit, competitors turned around and raced back to the Hotel Kosciusko. Finlayson won the Summit Trophy in 1935 with a time of 9 hours and 37 minutes, smashing the women's record by 1½ hours.

== 1936 Interdominion Championship AUS vs NZ ==
In 1936 Finlayson earned national selection for the first inter dominion championship between Australia & New Zealand. The championships took place at Mount Ruapehu, located in the center of the North Island of New Zealand. Unfortunately she had to pull out as she was in hospital suffering from blood poisoning in her hand.

== 1939 Nordic World Ski Championship and Australian Ski Championship ==
Finlayson was selected to represent Australia at the 1939 Nordic World Ski Championship at Zakopane, Poland (12–15 February). She was lucky to even make the trip to Europe as she had an acute appendicitis on board ship just days after departing Sydney. She recovered quickly from the operation, continued on to Europe and began preparation in Austria and Switzerland. However, more bad luck was to befall her when she injured her ankle while training in St Anton and could not compete in the championships. This was a huge blow to Finlayson and the Australian ski team. She returned to Australia in August 1938 and had to compete in the men's event (placing 4th) as the women's event had been cancelled. The following year, Finlayson then won all events in the 1939 Australian Ski Championships.

== First Australian female ski instructor ==
In 1941, Finlayson was appointed Australia's first female ski instructor. She taught firstly at Charlotte Pass, NSW and then later on at Mount Buffalo, Victoria. Finlayson had to resign from the AWSC (Australian Women's Ski Club) as she was no longer considered to be an amateur. This meant she was not allowed to compete in the Australian or NSW ski championships, nor eligible for Olympic selection.

== 1949 and 1950 Australian Ski Championships ==
In 1949, the International Ski Federation (FIS) changed the rules governing amateur standing and Finlayson was once again allowed to compete at the NSW and Australian Championships. She went on to scoop the pool in all events in both 1949 and 1950. She retired from competitive skiing after marrying in October 1950.
