= Kosciusko Alpine Club =

Australian ski club

Kosciusko Alpine Club (KAC) is the second oldest ski club in Australia after the Kiandra Pioneer Ski Club (1861). It was founded in 1909, two months after the NSW Government opened the Hotel Kosciusko at Diggers Creek, the first hotel in the Kosciusko area. The Hotel Kosciusko became the winter home of KAC until 1930 when the Kosciusko Chalet opened at Charlotte's Pass. KAC was the only ski club in the Kosciuszko area until 1920 when the Ski Club of Australia was formed.

KAC pioneered ski racing at Kosciuszko in 1909 and in 1913 introduced the Summit Trophy for the fastest trip on skis, during a winter season, from the Hotel Kosciusko to the summit of Mt Kosciuszko and return (55 km). The Summit Trophy was the most prized ski competition in NSW until World War II.

As it was the major skiing body in Australia at the time, KAC in 1919 instituted the Australian Championship, a single event, eight-kilometre cross country race and continued to run this event until 1929 after which it handed over control to the newly-formed Ski Council of NSW. Thereafter the Australian Championships comprised four events, Slalom, Downhill, Cross-country and Jump.

White's River Hut, just south of Schlink Pass near Mt Gungartan, was built as a shepherd's hut by the Clarke family in 1935. In 1938, KAC gained permission to use this hut as winter accommodation for its members. The hut is no longer privately owned but is still cared for by KAC and still used by club members and is open to all skiers.

In 1939, a company called Alpine Hut Club was formed to take advantage of the skiing in the Brassy Mountain area of the Main Range. The company, made up substantially of KAC members, but also including other skiers, bought freehold land just outside the Kosciuszko National Park and built Alpine Hut which accommodated 14 skiers and had its own manager. From the 1950s onwards, the advent of new resorts at Perisher Valley, Smiggin Holes, Guthega and Thredbo, with their new systems of uphill transport, brought to an end the use of White's River and Alpine Huts for all but dedicated ski tourers.

In 1948, a KAC syndicate bought an Avro Anson aircraft and began a two days per week air service from Sydney to Cooma for its members and other interested skiers. The service was only authorised for the 1948 winter but the syndicate continued it during the 1948–49 summer and ran afoul of the Department of Civil Aviation which then cancelled the service. This air service was the forerunner of a later commercial one by Butler Air Transport in 1956.

In 1947 skiing in NSW, with the exception of Kiandra, was under the control of the NSW Government which would not allow clubs to build their own accommodation. At the time the Government owned two hotels, the Hotel Kosciusko at Diggers Creek and the Chalet at Charlotte's Pass and, between the two, a much smaller lodge, Betts Camp. The Government realised that it could not keep up with the booming post-war interest in skiing and decided to allow ski clubs to build their own accommodation. The first clubs to build were Kosciusko Snow Revellers Club in Perisher Valley (1950), Ski Tourers Association at Lake Albina (1951), KAC at Charlotte's Pass (1952) and Telemark Ski Club in Perisher Valley (1952).

In 1953 a syndicate of KAC members formed the Alpine Transport Company (ATC) to start an oversnow transport service, based at Smiggin Holes, for skiers and goods in Perisher Valley. ATC used ex World War II M. 29 Cargo Carriers ("Weasels") with caterpillar tracks. This was the forerunner of the present Hans Oversnow Service.

In 1956, KAC purchased Ibis Hut from the NSW Water Conservation and Irrigation Commission. Ibis Hut was an elegant stone hut overlooking Spencer's Creek and about 2 km from the Chalet at Charlottes Pass with accommodation for six people. Ibis Hut was used by members of the club for low cost accommodation but was sold in 1967 due to disuse.

The original KAC lodge at Charlotte's Pass burnt down in 1963 and was rebuilt in 1964. After numerous updates the accommodation wing was completely rebuilt in 1998–99. In 1969 KAC bought its Jubilee lodge at Thredbo but sold it in 1974 and, with the proceeds bought Alpenhof lodge in Perisher Valley. Alpenhof was almost completely rebuilt between 2011 and 2013. In 1993 KAC returned to Thredbo with the purchase of Punchinello apartments thereafter known as KAC Thredbo.

In 1972 KAC instituted the KAC Martini and Rossi Cross-Country Race ("The Martini") from Perisher Valley to Charlotte's Pass (8.7 km). The race lost its original sponsor in 1999 and is now known simply as the KAC Cross-Country Classic. It takes place in August each year and is open to people in all age groups. It is one of the most popular cross-country races in Australia.
