= Charlotte Adams (mountain climber) =

Australian mountain climber (born 1859)

- Born: 1860
- Died: 5 September 1920 (aged 59–60); Darlinghurst
- Occupation: Mountaineer
- Spouse(s): Herbert Norfolk Cuningham

Charlotte A. Adams (later Charlotte A. Cunningham) (1860 – 5 September 1920) was an Australian mountain climber. She became the first woman of European descent to climb to the peak of Mount Kosciuszko in February 1881, aged 21.

== Biography ==
In February 1881, Adams accompanied her father, Philip Francis Adams, Surveyor General of New South Wales on a surveying trip to the Cooma district. On the trip, she climbed to the peak of Mount Kosciuszko, becoming the first known European woman to have made the climb.

Adams married Herbert Norfolk Cunningham, brother of Sir William Edward Fairlie-Cuninghame, 13th Baronet, on 19 April 1882.

She died in Darlinghurst on September 5, 1920.

== Legacy ==
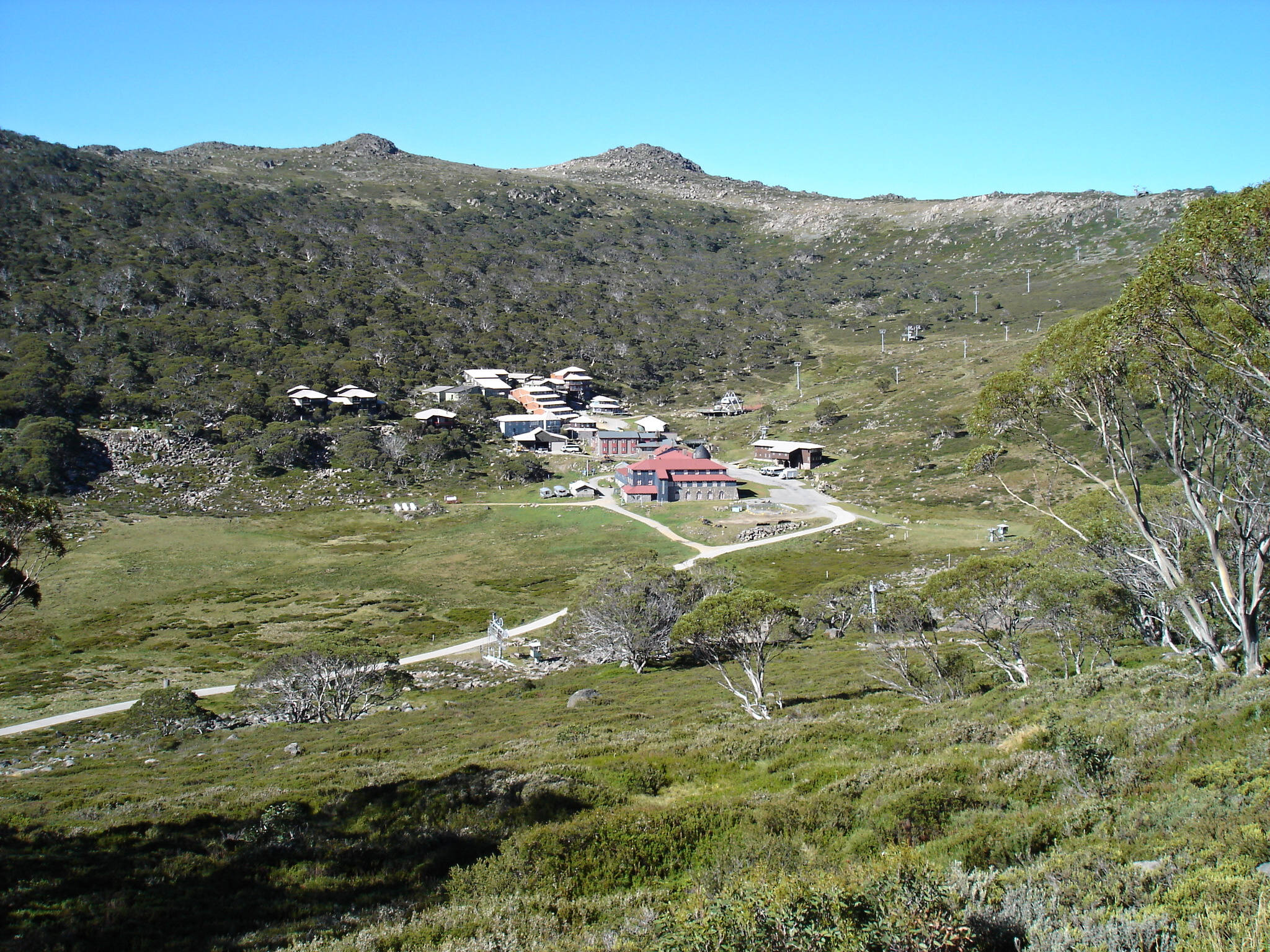
Charlotte Pass village is named for Charlotte Adams

The village of Charlotte Pass, New South Wales is named after Adams.
