= Kosciuszko Road =

Road in New South Wales, Australia

Kosciuszko Road New South Wales
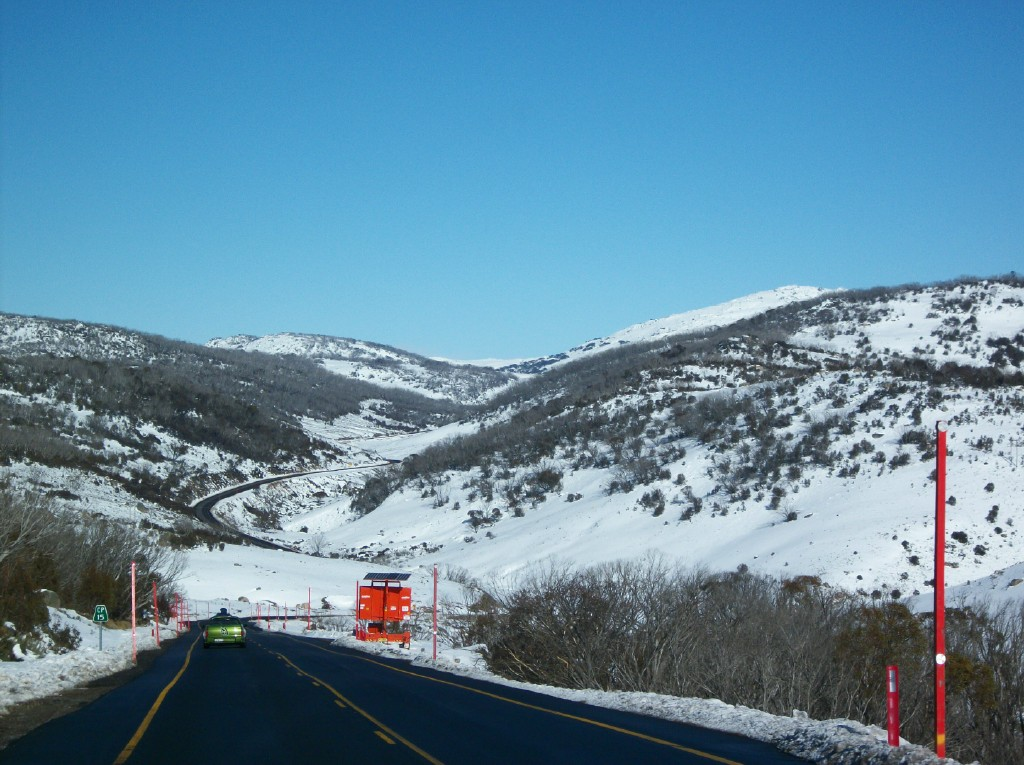
- Kosciuszko Road, towards Charlotte Pass
- Coordinates: 36.246988°S 149.051579°E (East end); 36.432049°S 148.328495°E (West end)

General information
- Type: Rural road
- Length: 95.4 km (59 mi)
- Gazetted: August 1928

Major junctions
- East end: Snowy Mountains Highway; Pine Valley, New South Wales
- Barry Way; Alpine Way
- West end: No through road Kosciuszko National Park, New South Wales

Location(s)
- Major settlements: Berridale, Jindabyne

Restrictions
- General: Within Kosciuszko National Park, it is compulsory for two-wheel drive vehicles to carry snow chains between the June and October long weekends.

Kosciuszko Road is a road in the Snowy Mountains of New South Wales, Australia, which runs from Pine Valley, to the ski resort of Charlotte Pass in Kosciuszko National Park.

== Route ==
Kosciuszko Road branches from the Snowy Mountains Highway in Pine Valley, nearly 7km west of Cooma, and heads roughly westwards, passing through the towns of Berridale and Jindabyne, before crossing the Thredbo River and entering Kosciuszko National Park. Within the national park, it provides access to Smiggin Holes, Perisher Valley and Charlotte Pass ski resorts, and terminates just past the entry to the latter.

== History ==
The passing of the Main Roads Act of 1924 through the Parliament of New South Wales provided for the declaration of Main Roads, roads partially funded by the State government through the Main Roads Board. Main Road No. 286 was declared along this road on 8 August 1928, from the intersection with Monaro Highway (today Snowy Mountains Highway) at Pine Valley via Berridale and Jindabyne to Mount Kosciuszko; with the passing of the Main Roads (Amendment) Act of 1929 to provide for additional declarations of State Highways and Trunk Roads, this was amended to Main Road 286 on 8 April 1929.

The passing of the Roads Act of 1993 updated road classifications and the way they could be declared within New South Wales. Under this act, Kosciuszko Road retains its declaration as Main Road 286, from Pine Valley to Charlotte Pass.

== Major intersections ==
Kosciuszko Road is entirely contained within the Snowy Monaro Regional Council local government area.

Location	km	mi	Destinations	Notes
Pine Valley	0.0	0.0	Snowy Mountains Highway (B72) - Tumut, Cooma	Eastern terminus of road
Berridale	25.8	16.0	Myack Street, to Dalgety Road – Dalgety	
Hill Top	41.1	25.5	Eucumbene Road. Eucumbene	
Snowy River	51.6	32.1	Jindabyne Dam	
Jindabyne	55.6	34.5	Barry Way - Suggan Buggan, Buchan	Roundabout
Jindabyne	57.5	35.7	Alpine Way - Khancoban, Corryong	
Thredbo River	63.2	39.3	Bridge (no known official name)	
Perisher Valley	86.8	53.9	Perisher Creek Road - Blue Cow	
Charlotte Pass	94.3	58.6	Charlotte Way - Charlotte Pass	
Charlotte Pass	95.4	59.3	No through road	Western terminus of road To Mount Kosciuszko Summit via walking track
1.000 mi = 1.609 km; 1.000 km = 0.621 mi: Route transition

== Gallery ==
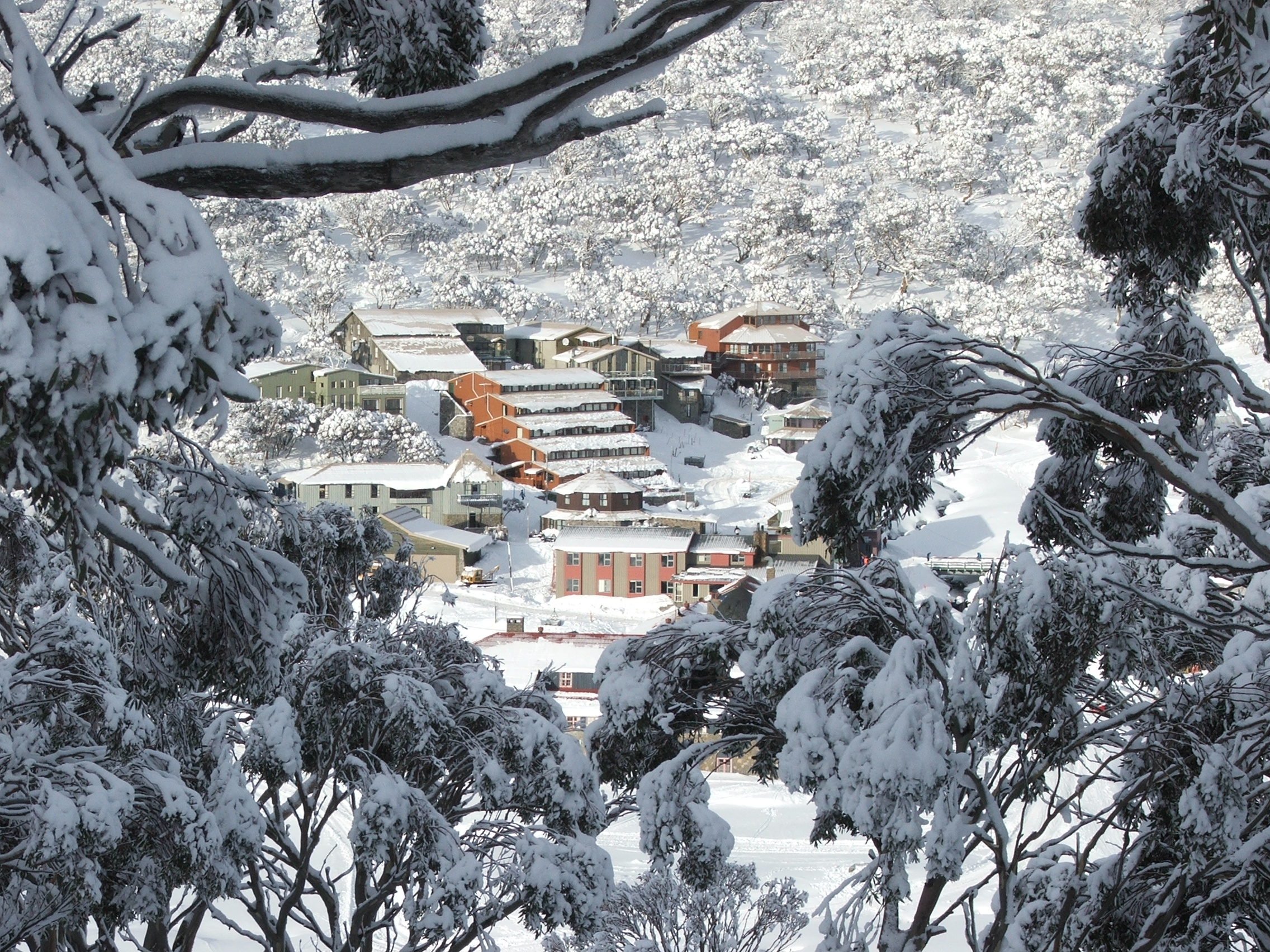
Charlotte Pass Ski Resort from Kosciuszko Road in winter.

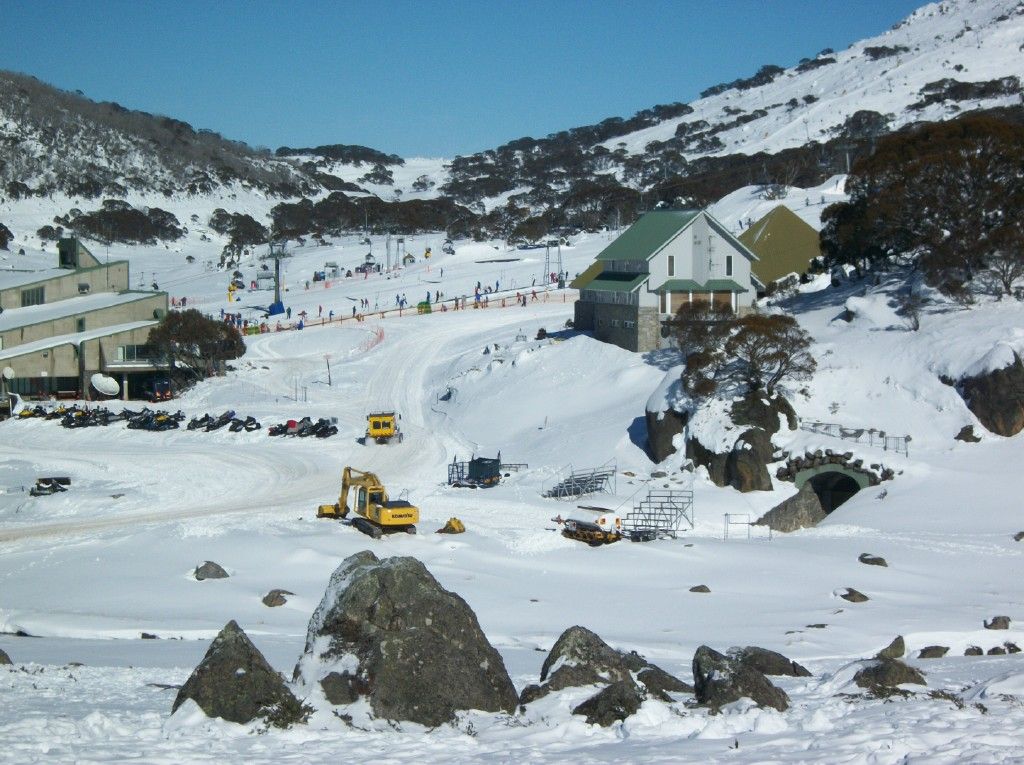
Perisher, Australia's largest ski resort, can be accessed via Kosciuszko Road.

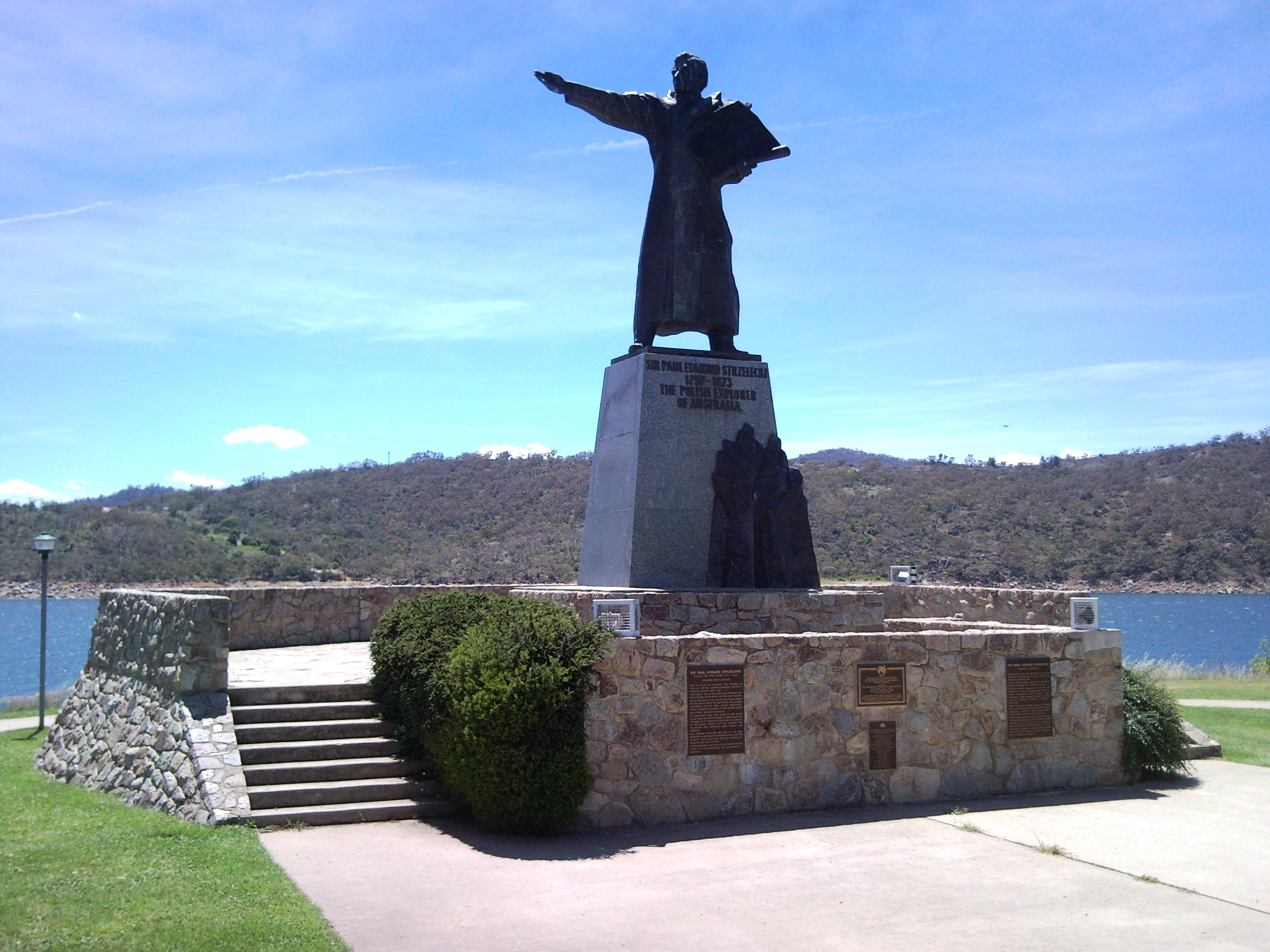
Statue of Sir Paul Strzelecki in the Snowy Mountains town of Jindabyne.

== See also ==
- Highways in Australia
- Highways in New South Wales
