= Barry Way =

Track in New South Wales, Australia

Coordinates: 36°29′S 148°34′E

Barry Way New South Wales
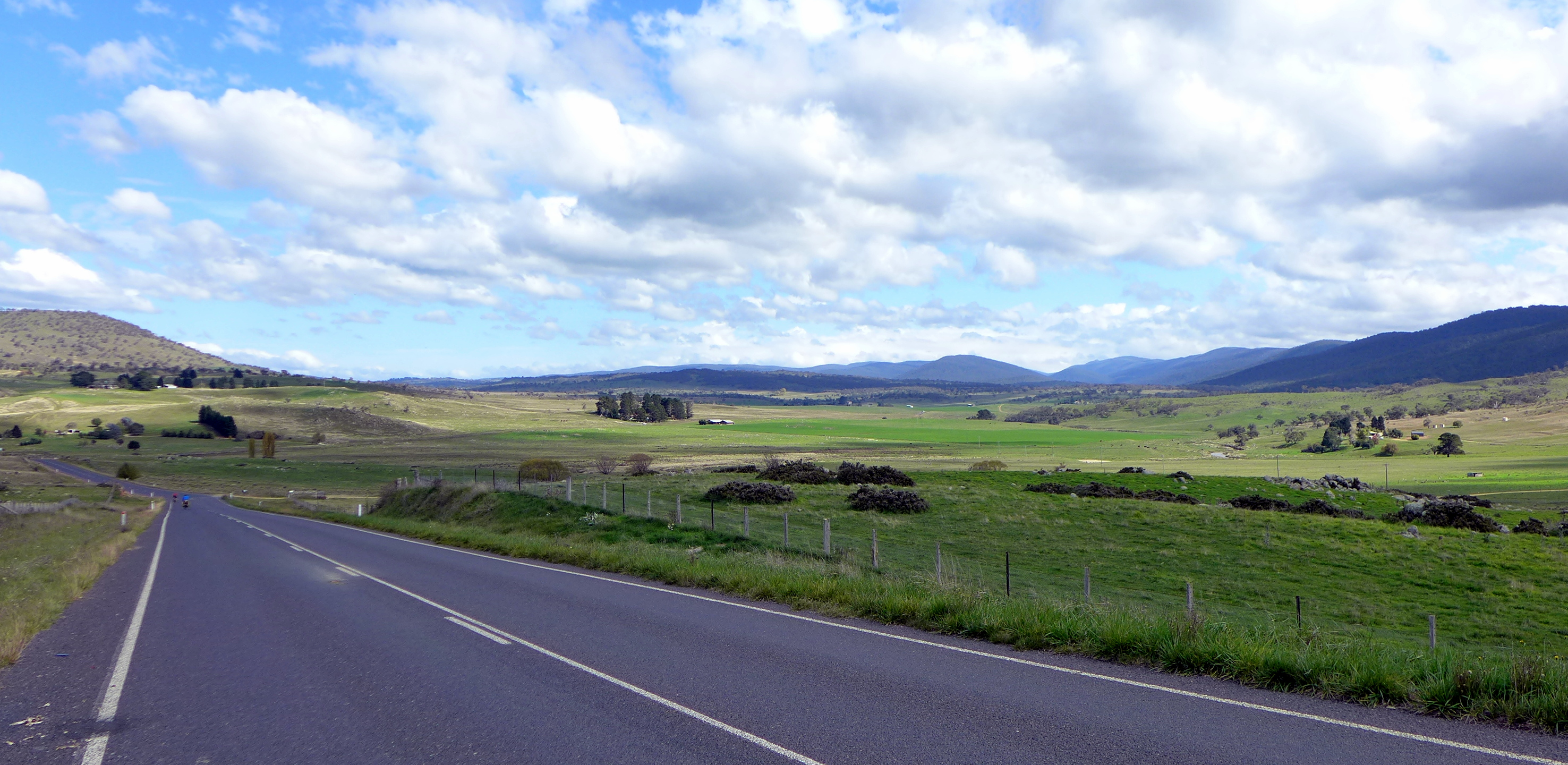
- The start of the Barry Way near Jindabyne

General information
- Type: Track
- Length: 71.6 km (44 mi)

Major junctions
- North end: Alpine Way; Jindabyne, New South Wales
- South end: Snowy River Road (C608); New South Wales / Victoria border within Kosciuszko National Park

The Barry Way is a partly unsealed alpine road running from Jindabyne southwest to the Victoria border, in New South Wales, Australia, where it becomes the Snowy River Road. It eventually leads to Buchan, a total distance of 170 kilometres with no services or towns. It is sealed for the first 27 kilometres from Jindabyne, passing through the Moonbah and Grosses Plain localities and becoming unsealed at Ingebirah Gap, remaining so through the Ingeegoodbee locality as far as the Victorian border. The road passes through some very remote and unspoilt wilderness in the Australian Alps close to the river. The scenery along the road provides views of the Snowy River valley and the surrounding mountains. There are a number of campsites along the road, from Jacobs River southwards. The road passes the Wallace Craigie Lookout.

During the summer months, the weather on the Barry Way can be extremely hot and this road may be temporarily closed due to bushfires. In winter the road north of the Victorian border can be closed for considerable periods due to heavy snowfalls and dangerous ice. The gravel section can be challenging for 2WD vehicles and caravans. This road has no major intersections between Jindabyne and the Victorian border, and no petrol is available before Gelantipy in Victoria.

At the New South Wales / Victoria border, the Barry Way becomes known as Snowy River Road and continues southward into the East Gippsland region.

== History ==
The road is named after Leo Barry, president of the Snowy River Shire Council in the 1950s, who pushed for the creation of the road.

Construction of the Victorian portion of the road began as early as 1925 when a bridge was built over the Buchan River at Buchan. In the 1930s with the use of unemployed labourers, improvements were made to the Buchan-Gelantipy portion of the road. Work had progressed as far as the construction of the bridge over the Suggan Buggan River at Suggan Buggan when the start of World War II stopped work in 1939. All of the work completed up to this point in time was done using picks and shovels, with bullock teams employed to cart away the fill. All the stonework for the culverts, pipes and embankments was constructed by hand using stone recovered during the road making process.

It was not until 1960 that the Tambo and Snowy River shires managed to secure funding to complete what was described as a jeep track (that would later be upgraded) connecting the Victorian and NSW sections built before the war. A Mr L. Livingstone was contracted to undertake the Victorian portion from Suggan Buggan to Willis on the Victorian–NSW border. The job took 26 weeks to complete with the Victorians reaching the border shortly before the New South Wales construction crew. The road was opened in May 1961 by Leo Barry (Snowy River Shire) and Keith Rogers (Tambo Shire), with some 400 people in attendance. Avalanche Lookout was constructed in these works.

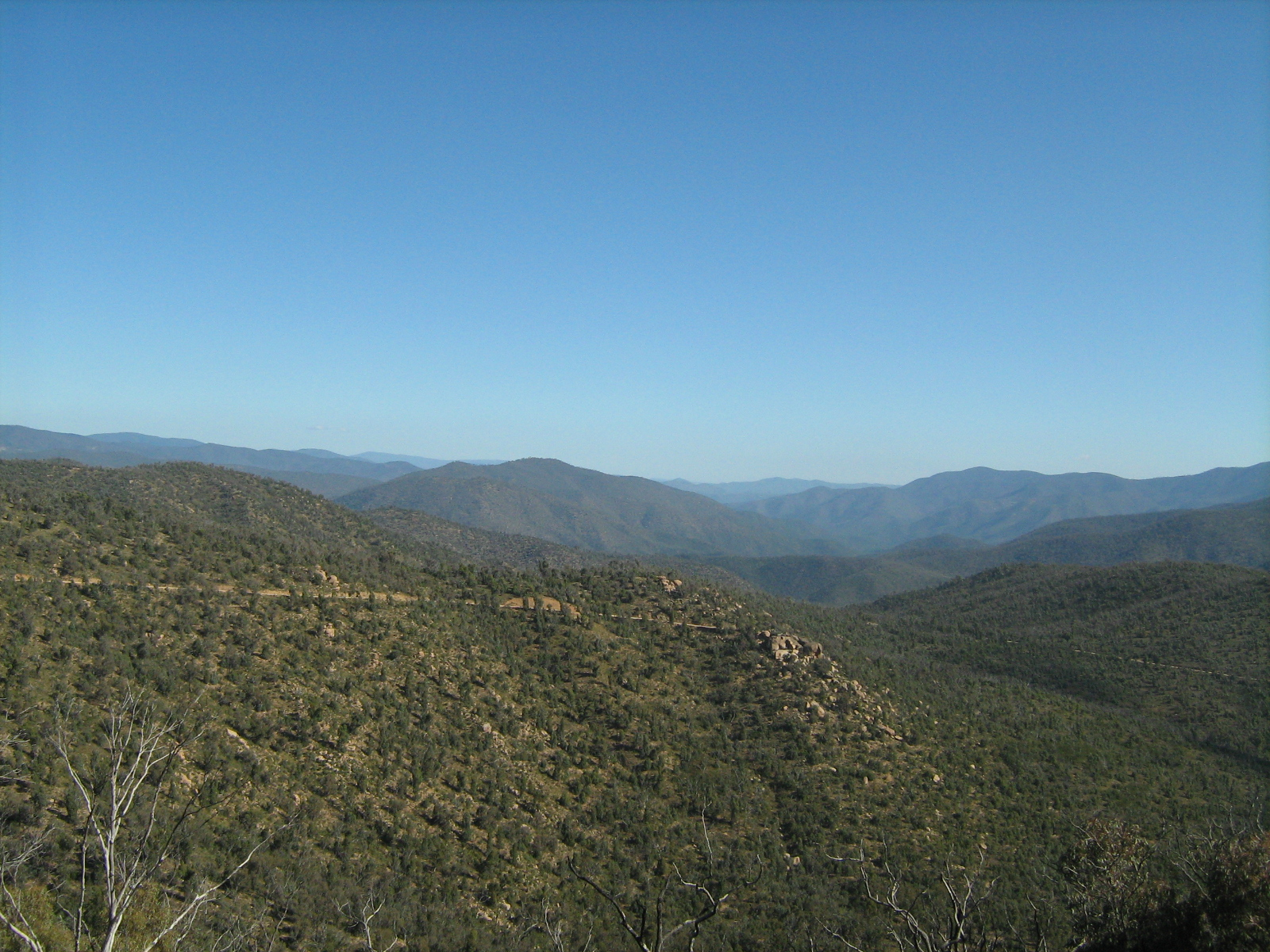
View from the Barry Way

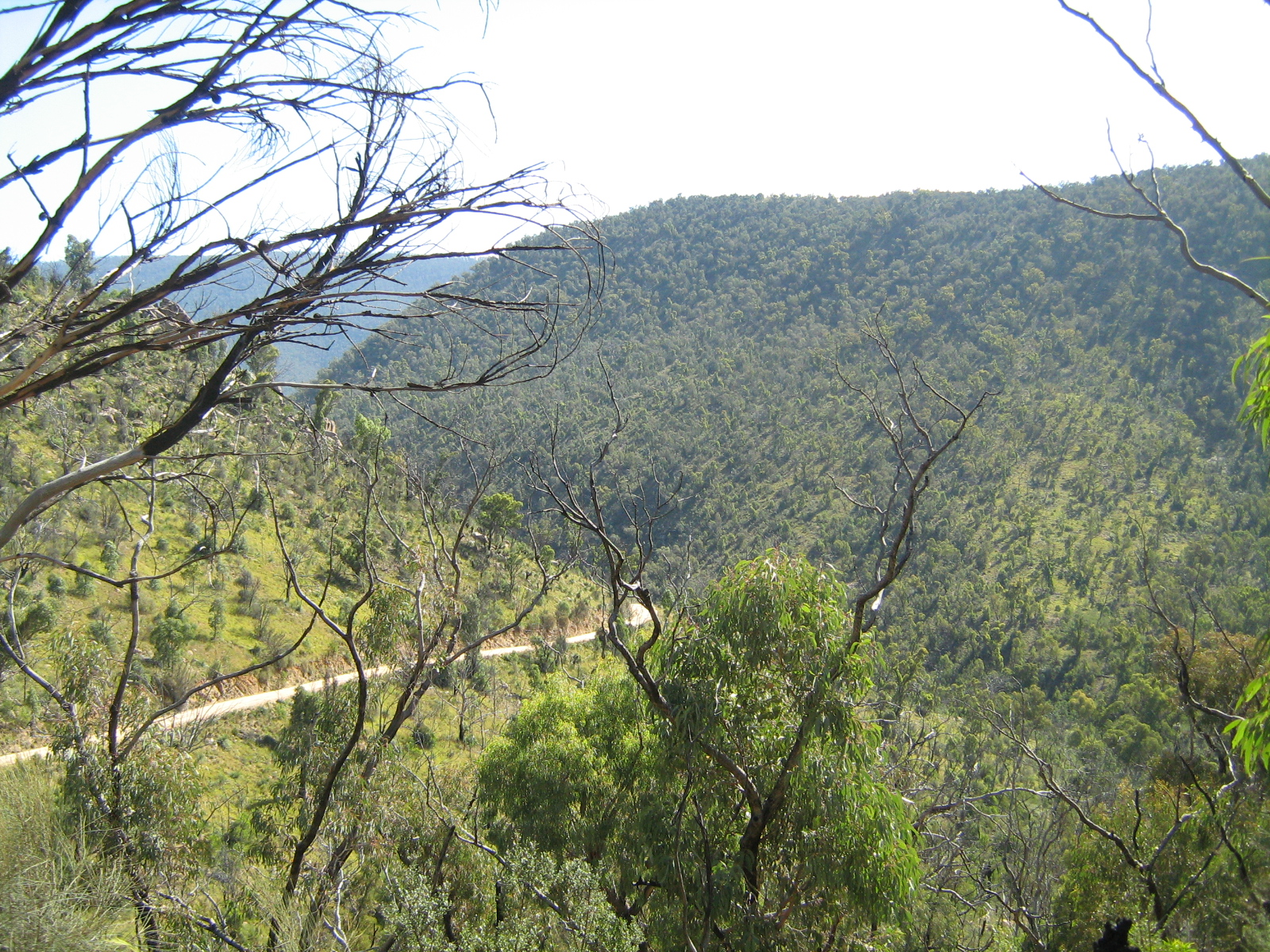
The Barry Way snakes its way through the Australian Alps.

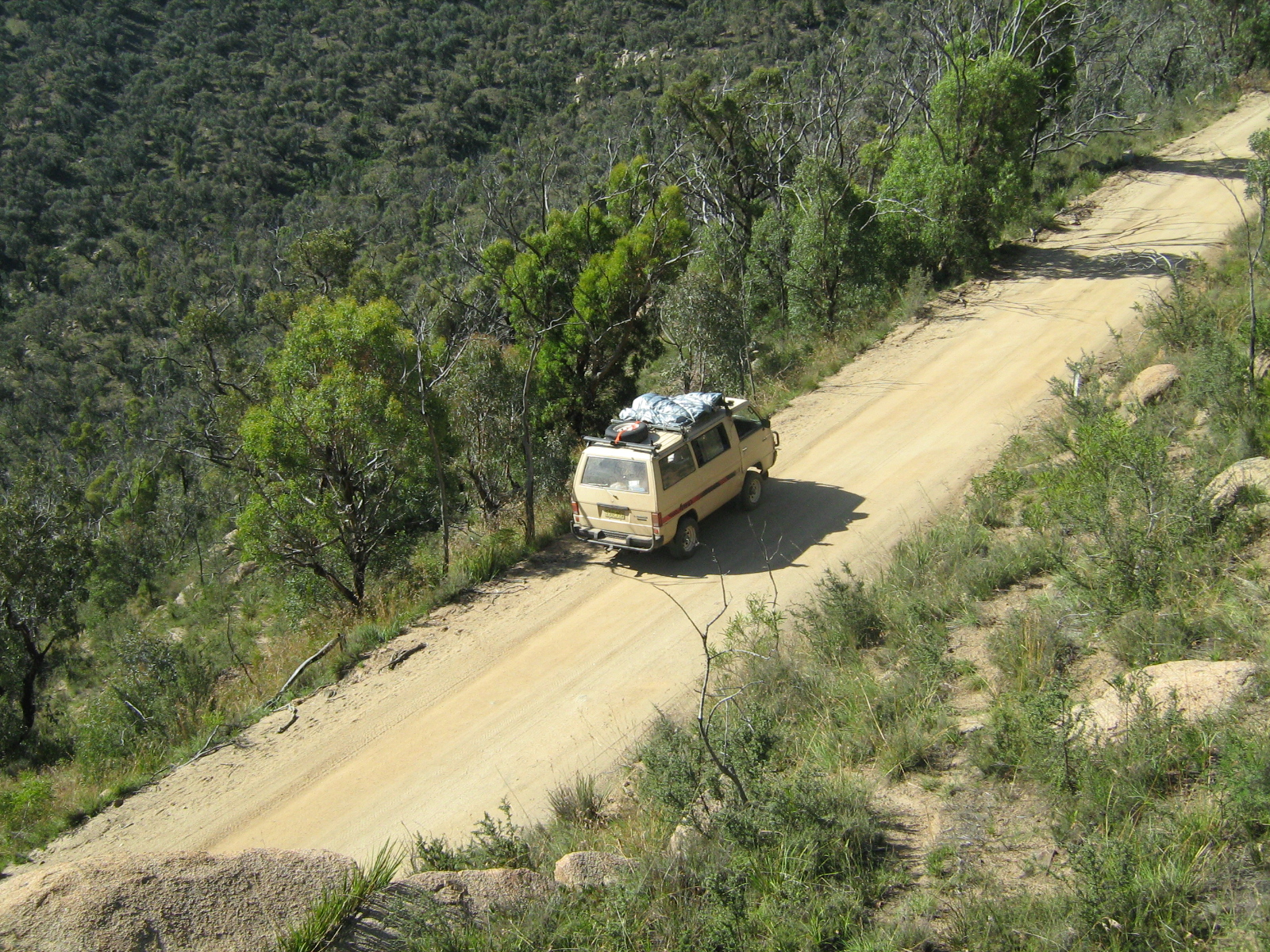
The Barry Way

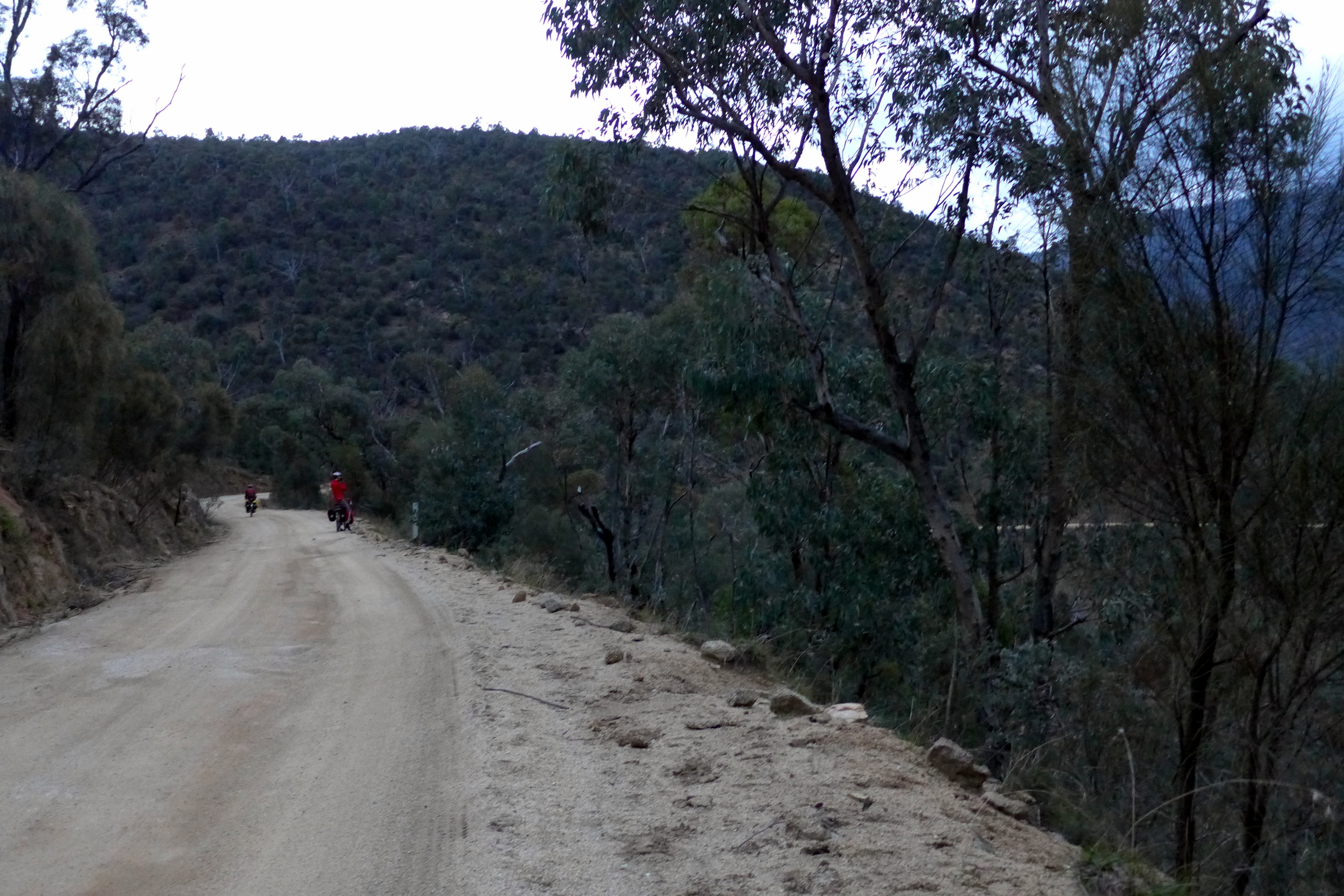

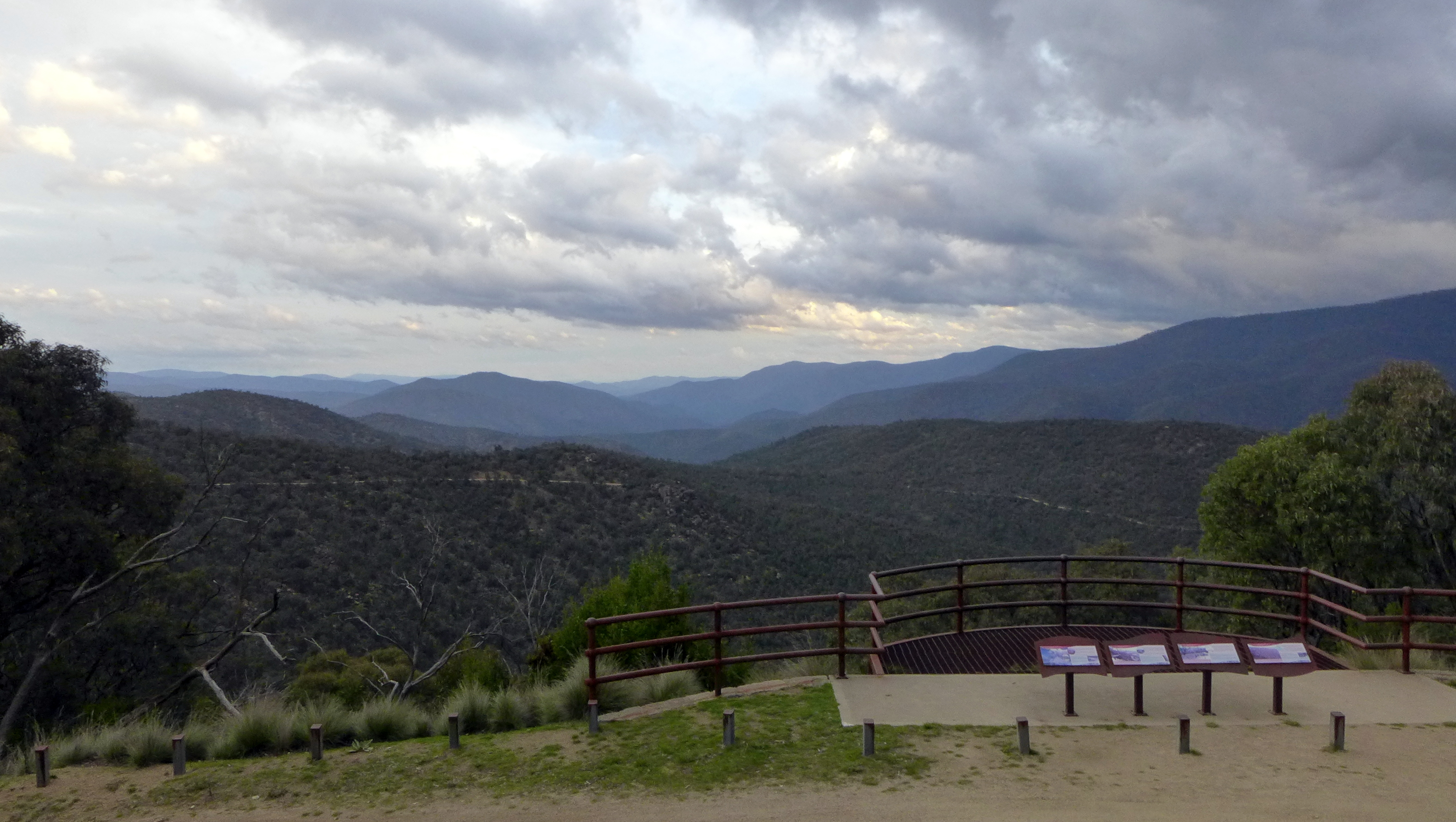
Wallace Craigie Lookout, along the Barry Way, looking south

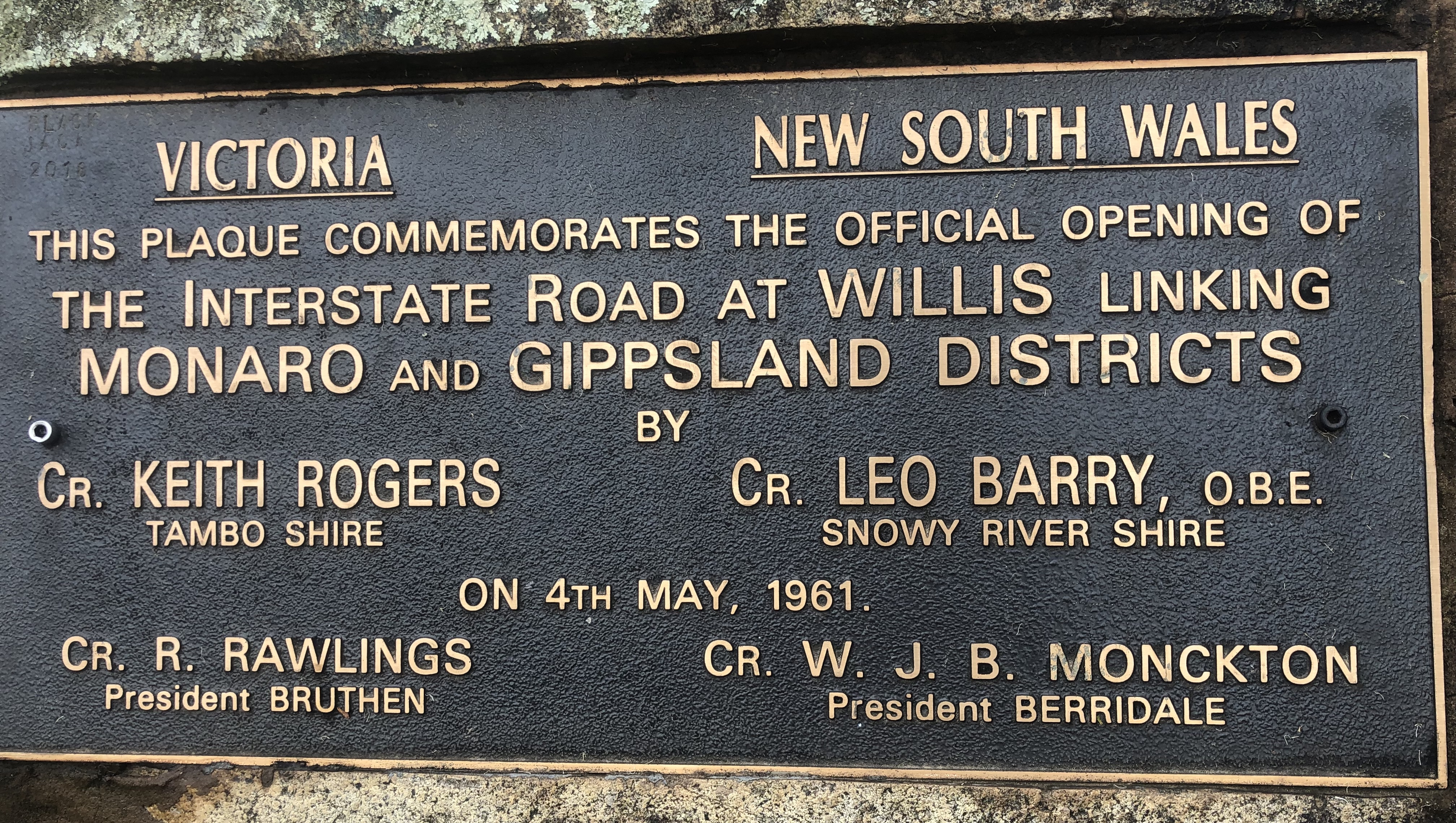
Commemorative plaque at the New South Wales/Victoria order

== See also ==
- Highways in Australia
- Highways in New South Wales
