= Charlotte Pass =

Ski resort in New South Wales, Australia

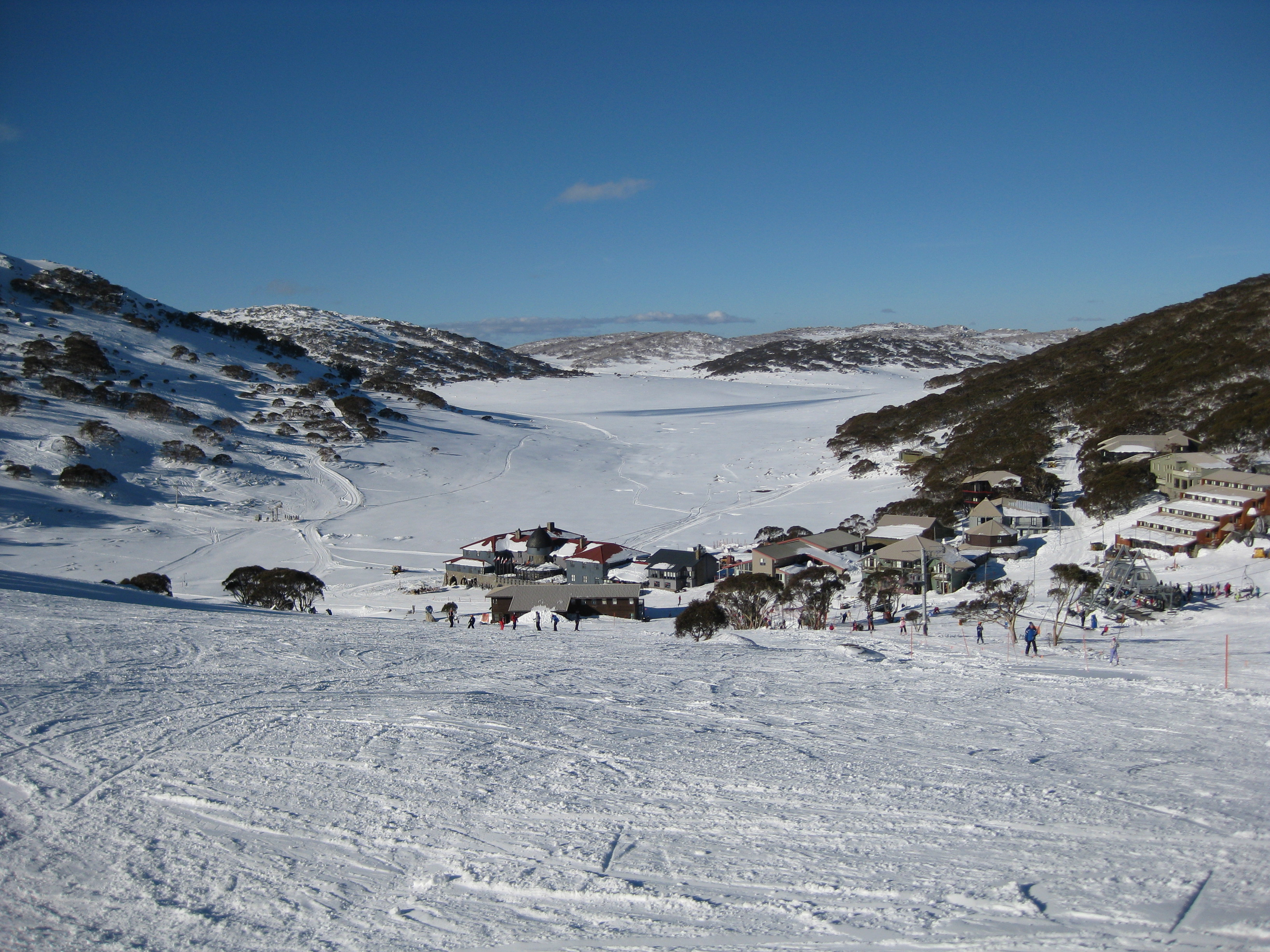
- Overlooking Charlotte Pass Village in winter
- Interactive map of Charlotte Pass
- Location: Snowy Mountains, New South Wales, Australia
- Nearest city: Canberra (city and major airport); Cooma (town and airport); Jindabyne (small town and small airport)
- Vertical: 209 m (686 ft)
- Top elevation: 1,964 m (6,444 ft)
- Base elevation: 1,765 m (5,791 ft)
- Skiable area: 50 ha (120 acres)
- Lift system: 5 total; 1 triple chairlift, 4 surface lifts (1 T-bar, 2 platter lifts, 1 moving carpet)
- Terrain parks: 1 small, movable
- Snowmaking: Mobile units
- Website: http://www.charlottepass.com.au/

Charlotte Pass (often erroneously referred to as Charlotte's Pass) is a snow resort and village in the Snowy Mountains of New South Wales, Australia. The pass is in the Kosciuszko National Park where the Kosciuszko Road crosses Kangaroo Ridge. Charlotte Pass is the closest village to Mount Kosciuszko, the tallest mountain in Australia.

Charlotte Pass Village is at the base of Kangaroo Ridge to the south east of the pass. It is one of Australia's oldest snow resorts. It is the coldest location in Australia, with a record low of −23.0 °C (−9.4 °F) and winter temperatures that regularly drop below −10 °C (14 °F).

The pass and village are named after Charlotte Adams, who, in 1881, was the first European woman to climb Mount Kosciuszko.

Charlotte Pass provides access to some of Australia's highest alpine terrain and was formerly a stop-off point for public vehicular access to Mount Kosciuszko, though the public access road now terminates at the Pass. Being an alpine area, it is subject to extremes in temperature, and is a recognised environmentally sensitive zone.

== History ==
The Snowy Mountains region is thought to have had Aboriginal occupation for some twenty thousand years. Large scale intertribal gatherings were held in the High Country during summer for collective feasting on the bogong moth. This practice continued until around 1865. The area was first explored by Europeans in 1835, and in 1840, Edmund Strzelecki ascended Mount Kosciuszko and named it after a Polish patriot. High country stockmen followed who used the Snowy Mountains for grazing during the summer months. Banjo Paterson's famous poem The Man From Snowy River recalls this era. The cattle graziers have left a legacy of mountain huts scattered across the area. Charlotte Pass itself is named after Charlotte Adams who, in 1881, became the first European woman to climb Mount Kosciuszko, Australia's highest peak.

The Kosciuszko National Park in which Charlotte Pass is situated came into existence as the National Chase Snowy Mountains on 5 December 1906. In April 1944, following the passage of the Kosciusko State Park Act, the Kosciusko State Park was proclaimed. In 1967, this became the Kosciusko National Park, renamed Kosciuszko National Park in 1997.

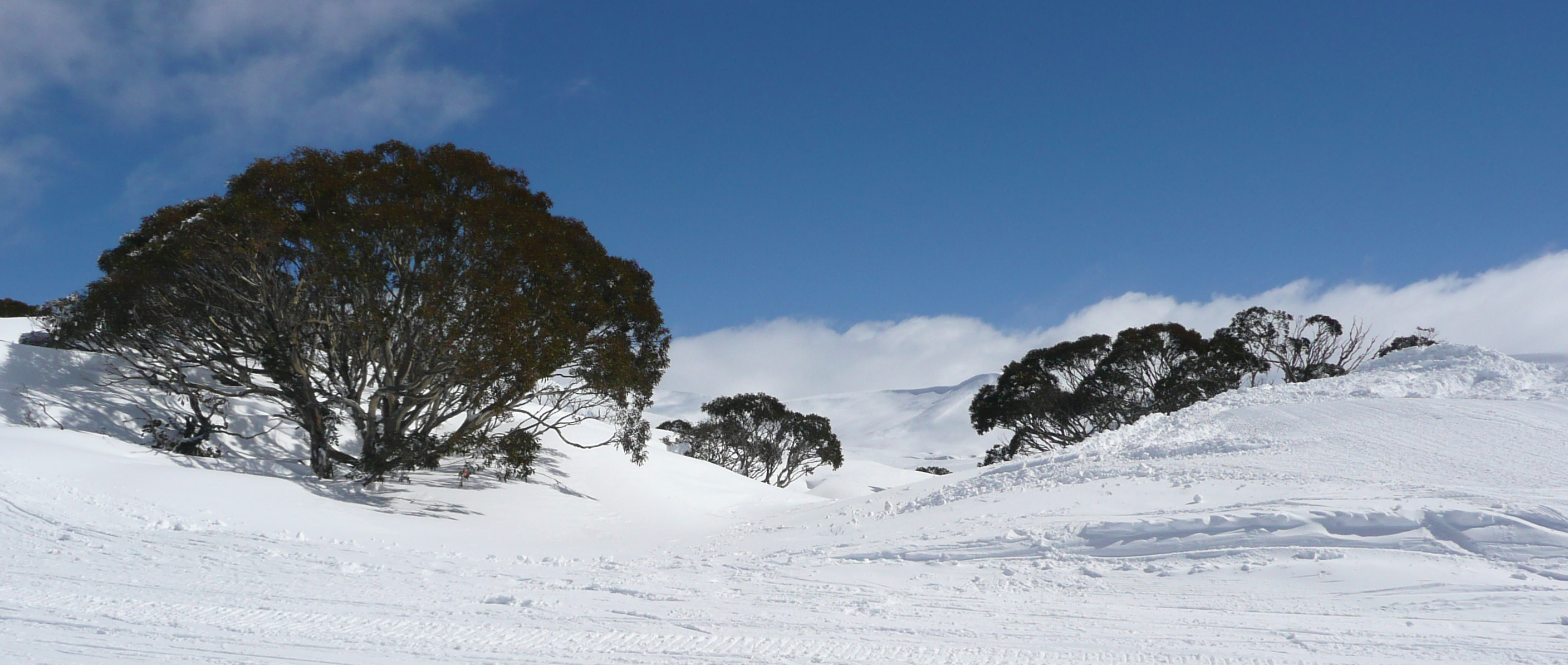
Looking through Charlotte Pass towards the main range in winter

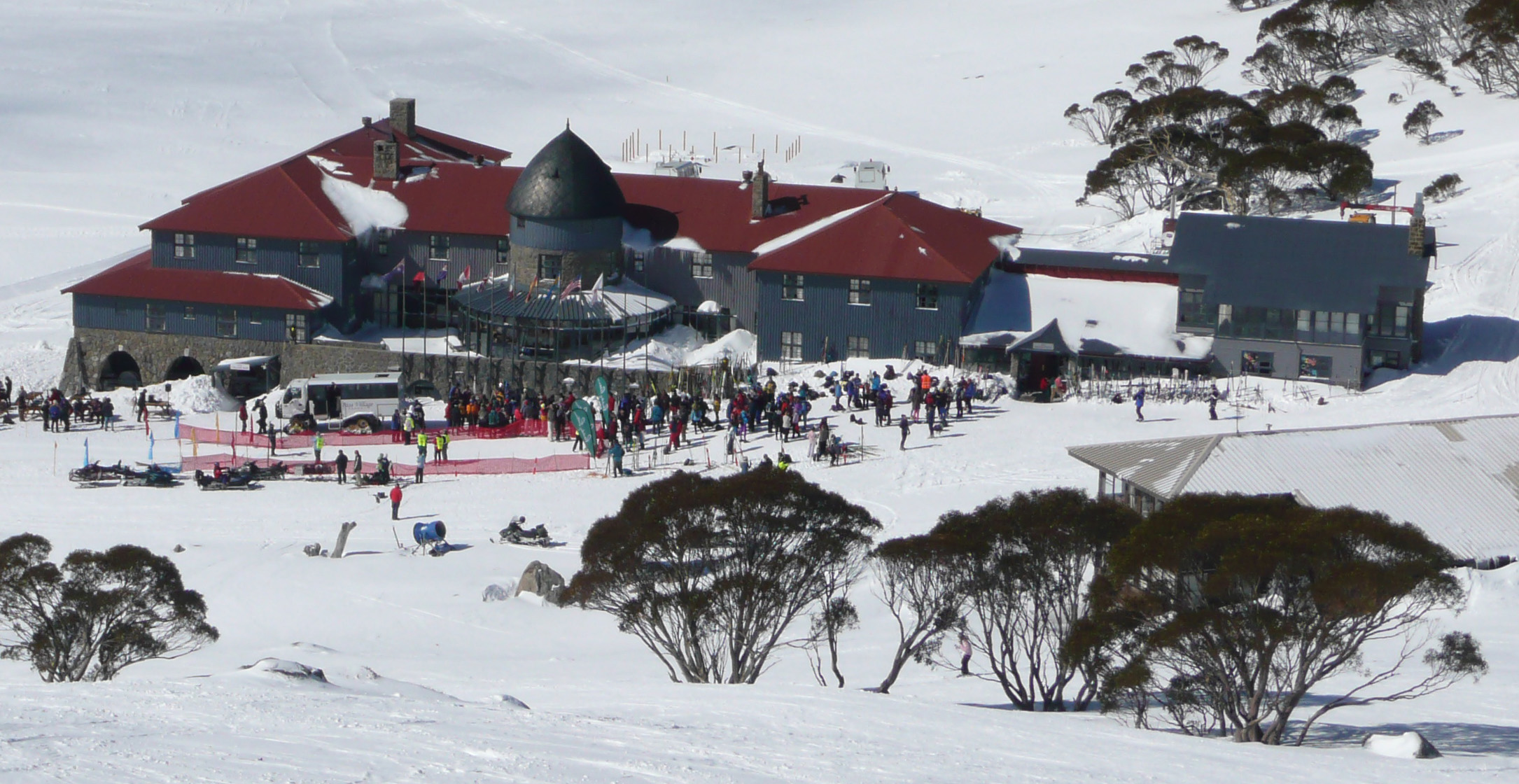
The Chalet during August

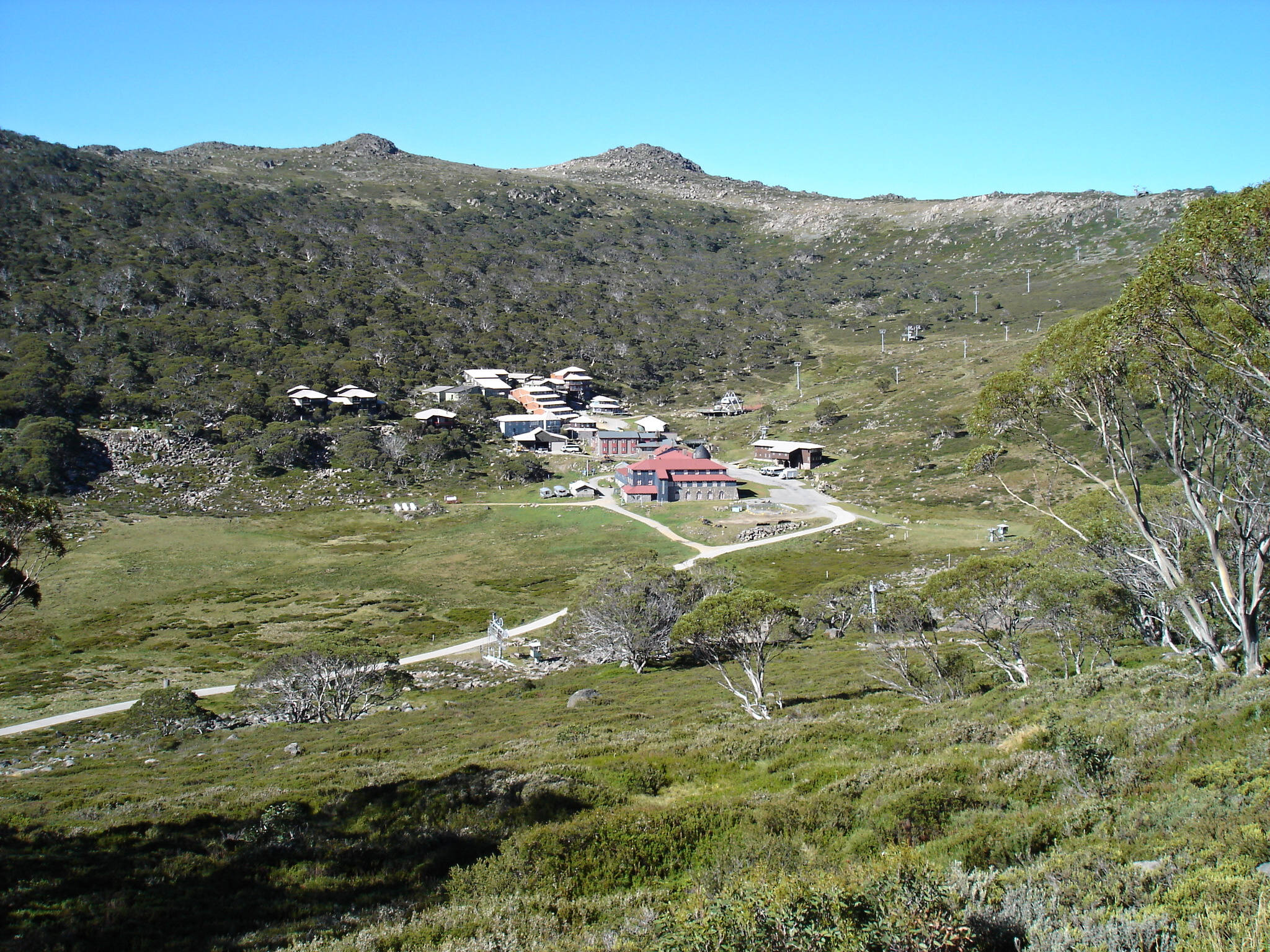
Charlotte Pass in April

The historic Kosciuszko Chalet was the first building at Charlotte Pass village, and was opened on 10 May 1930. The Chalet at Charlotte Pass was one of several alpine area accommodation facilities built by government in Australia, and offered an opulent life style at the time. The Chalet burnt down in August 1938, and a new Chalet was built in its place the following summer. The Chalet is still the largest and most significant building in the village, and remains the heart of the village in winter.

Skiing in Australia had begun some six decades earlier at Kiandra in the Northern Snowy Mountains, but the first Kosciuszko Chalet built at Charlotte Pass in 1930 gave relatively comfortable access to Australia's highest terrain. At 1760m, Charlotte Pass has the highest village base elevation of any Australia ski resort and can only be accessed via over-snow transport in winter. The growing number of ski enthusiasts heading to Charlotte Pass led to the establishment of a cafe at Smiggin Holes around 1939, where horse-drawn sleighs would deliver skiers to the start of the arduous ski to the Kosciuszko Chalet. It was the construction of the Snowy Mountains Hydro-Electric Scheme from 1949 that opened up the Snowy Mountains for large scale development of a ski industry and led to the establishment of nearby Thredbo and Perisher as leading Australian resorts. Kosciusko Alpine Club was the first ski club to build its own lodge here in 1952, having occupied the Chalet earlier. Other club lodges were built soon after.

Ski fields beyond Charlotte Pass and up by Kosciuszko's side were also established during this period, though their existence is now little realised. The Australian Alpine Club was founded in 1950 by Charles Anton with a view to establishing a chain of lodges for ski touring across the Australian Alps. Huts were constructed in the "Back Country" close to Mount Kosciuszko, including Kunama Hut, which opened for the 1953 season. A rope tow was installed on Mount Northcote at the site and opened in 1954. The site proved excellent for speed skiing, but the hut was destroyed in an avalanche, which also killed one person, in 1956. In 1964, Australia briefly boasted the "world's longest chairlift", designed to carry skiers from the Thredbo Valley to Charlotte Pass, but technical difficulties soon closed the facility.

For many decades, Charlotte Pass was a stop off point on the road offering public vehicular access to Mount Kosciuszko, however the Kosciuszko Road now terminates at Charlotte Pass. The last 9 kilometres leading to Mount Kosciuszko have been closed, for environmental reasons, since 1982.

The village and resort precinct are part of the Kosciuszko National Park, and the village is leased to and operated by Charlotte Pass Village Pty Ltd until at least October 2017. Apart from the Chalet, the village contains 12 commercial and club lodges, and has the capacity to hold 607 guests.

== Climate ==
Charlotte Pass has a subpolar oceanic climate (Köppen Cfc) if using the −3 °C/27 °F isotherm or a subarctic climate (Dfc) using the 0 °C/32 °F isotherm, though the higher peaks have a Tundra climate (ET). It has the lowest recorded temperature in Australia (excluding Antarctic territories), of −23.0 °C (−9.4 °F) on 28 June 1994. There are an average of 55.7 snowy days annually, being equal to Macquarie Island on this metric.

Annual rain fall averages 2329.6 mm, with about half falling as snow between May and September, although conditions result in the snowpack typically never exceeding 2.5 m to 3 m. Official snow depths are not recorded for Charlotte Pass, but are recorded by the Snowy Hydro Limited at nearby Spencers Creek (elev. 1,830 m). A typical snow depth at its peak is about 2 m. Summer rain is usually in the form of thunderstorms, which, due to the area's elevation, can carry large quantities of hail, and severe hailstorms generally occur a few times each summer.

Snow has been recorded at all times of the year, some persisting on the ground for weeks even at the height of summer. While snowfalls at unexpected times can add interest to the area, they are typically associated with very severe weather events, which can also cause havoc with disastrous consequences. For example, weather patterns bringing snow on Boxing Day and the following day in 1998 caused loss of life in the Sydney to Hobart yacht race that year.

Climate data for Charlotte Pass (Kosciuszko Chalet, 1991–2015, extremes 1930–2015); 1,755 m (5,758 ft) AMSL; 36.43° S, 148.33° E
Month	Jan	Feb	Mar	Apr	May	Jun	Jul	Aug	Sep	Oct	Nov	Dec	Year
Record high °C (°F)	29.7 (85.5)	28.0 (82.4)	24.5 (76.1)	19.8 (67.6)	16.2 (61.2)	12.3 (54.1)	9.0 (48.2)	11.1 (52.0)	15.6 (60.1)	20.5 (68.9)	28.3 (82.9)	28.9 (84.0)	29.7 (85.5)
Mean maximum °C (°F)	24.8 (76.6)	22.6 (72.7)	20.7 (69.3)	16.1 (61.0)	13.2 (55.8)	9.3 (48.7)	5.9 (42.6)	7.8 (46.0)	11.0 (51.8)	16.4 (61.5)	20.4 (68.7)	21.9 (71.4)	25.3 (77.5)
Mean daily maximum °C (°F)	18.6 (65.5)	17.7 (63.9)	14.8 (58.6)	10.9 (51.6)	7.3 (45.1)	3.9 (39.0)	2.2 (36.0)	3.1 (37.6)	5.4 (41.7)	10.2 (50.4)	13.7 (56.7)	15.8 (60.4)	10.3 (50.5)
Daily mean °C (°F)	12.3 (54.1)	11.6 (52.9)	8.7 (47.7)	5.1 (41.2)	2.4 (36.3)	−0.1 (31.8)	−2.0 (28.4)	−1.2 (29.8)	1.5 (34.7)	5.0 (41.0)	8.1 (46.6)	9.7 (49.5)	5.1 (41.2)
Mean daily minimum °C (°F)	5.9 (42.6)	5.4 (41.7)	2.5 (36.5)	−0.8 (30.6)	−2.5 (27.5)	−4.1 (24.6)	−6.2 (20.8)	−5.5 (22.1)	−2.5 (27.5)	−0.3 (31.5)	2.5 (36.5)	3.6 (38.5)	−0.2 (31.7)
Mean minimum °C (°F)	−2.3 (27.9)	−1.6 (29.1)	−3.9 (25.0)	−7.5 (18.5)	−8.8 (16.2)	−11.9 (10.6)	−15.3 (4.5)	−13.2 (8.2)	−9.9 (14.2)	−6.7 (19.9)	−5.0 (23.0)	−3.7 (25.3)	−16.6 (2.1)
Record low °C (°F)	−5.6 (21.9)	−5.5 (22.1)	−6.7 (19.9)	−13.0 (8.6)	−13.4 (7.9)	−23.0 (−9.4)	−19.6 (−3.3)	−20.6 (−5.1)	−16.7 (1.9)	−12.0 (10.4)	−9.4 (15.1)	−7.0 (19.4)	−23.0 (−9.4)
Average precipitation mm (inches)	111.7 (4.40)	130.1 (5.12)	119.5 (4.70)	95.8 (3.77)	138.7 (5.46)	120.0 (4.72)	96.4 (3.80)	114.6 (4.51)	147.6 (5.81)	99.5 (3.92)	171.0 (6.73)	144.8 (5.70)	1,494.4 (58.83)
Average precipitation days (≥ 1.0 mm)	10.3	10.4	10.1	10.6	11.9	12.8	12.2	13.5	11.6	11.0	11.7	9.0	135.1
Source: Bureau of Meteorology

Climate data for Charlotte Pass (Kosciuszko Chalet, 1930–2015); 1,755 m AMSL; 36.43° S, 148.33° E
Month	Jan	Feb	Mar	Apr	May	Jun	Jul	Aug	Sep	Oct	Nov	Dec	Year
Record high °C (°F)	29.7 (85.5)	28.0 (82.4)	24.5 (76.1)	19.8 (67.6)	16.2 (61.2)	12.3 (54.1)	9.0 (48.2)	11.1 (52.0)	15.6 (60.1)	20.5 (68.9)	28.3 (82.9)	28.9 (84.0)	29.7 (85.5)
Mean daily maximum °C (°F)	17.6 (63.7)	17.1 (62.8)	14.7 (58.5)	10.4 (50.7)	6.8 (44.2)	3.2 (37.8)	1.9 (35.4)	2.6 (36.7)	5.0 (41.0)	9.1 (48.4)	12.6 (54.7)	15.4 (59.7)	9.7 (49.5)
Daily mean °C (°F)	11.4 (52.5)	11.1 (52.0)	8.7 (47.7)	5.0 (41.0)	2.1 (35.8)	−1.0 (30.2)	−2.4 (27.7)	−1.6 (29.1)	0.9 (33.6)	4.3 (39.7)	7.3 (45.1)	9.6 (49.3)	4.6 (40.3)
Mean daily minimum °C (°F)	5.1 (41.2)	5.0 (41.0)	2.6 (36.7)	−0.5 (31.1)	−2.7 (27.1)	−5.1 (22.8)	−6.7 (19.9)	−5.7 (21.7)	−3.3 (26.1)	−0.5 (31.1)	1.9 (35.4)	3.7 (38.7)	−0.5 (31.1)
Record low °C (°F)	−5.6 (21.9)	−5.5 (22.1)	−6.7 (19.9)	−13.0 (8.6)	−13.4 (7.9)	−23.0 (−9.4)	−19.6 (−3.3)	−20.6 (−5.1)	−16.7 (1.9)	−12.0 (10.4)	−9.4 (15.1)	−7.0 (19.4)	−23.0 (−9.4)
Average precipitation mm (inches)	128.0 (5.04)	132.9 (5.23)	141.0 (5.55)	150.2 (5.91)	178.0 (7.01)	180.2 (7.09)	181.0 (7.13)	201.1 (7.92)	189.2 (7.45)	206.7 (8.14)	189.9 (7.48)	150.1 (5.91)	2,028.3 (79.86)
Average precipitation days (≥ 0.2 mm)	10.3	10.4	10.1	10.6	11.9	12.8	12.2	12.9	11.0	11.0	11.7	9.0	133.9
Average afternoon relative humidity (%)	62	62	61	67	75	86	90	87	79	68	65	62	72
Source: Australian Bureau of Meteorology; Charlotte Pass (Kosciuszko Chalet)

The apparent reduction in rainfall in 1991–2015 compared to 1948–2015 owes largely to the lack of a heated rain gauge after 1990, which leads to unregistered precipitation when a great mass of snow accumulates. This is evident by the greatly reduced cool-season rainfall in particular, as much of that would have fallen as snow and gone unregistered by the new gauge.

== Wildlife ==
The area has been long been used as a base for environmental research, for example for plankton studies in the nearby post glacial lake Blue Lake in 1937 using a flat bottomed boat, and more recently, for example in 1997 as a heliport for studies of the mountain pygmy possum.

Of major faunal significance is the endangered mountain pygmy possum (Burramys parvus), which from 1894 until 1966 was only known from the fossil record, and the threatened broad-toothed mouse. These small marsupials are adapted to mountain life, however most other Australian animals find it hard to survive the cold climate and heavy snow. Animals that do manage to survive in the area and are occasionally seen include eastern grey kangaroos, wombats, platypus, crows, magpies, crimson rosellas, flame robins, and introduced animals such as rabbits, foxes and red deer.

== Recreation ==
=== Skiing ===
An area between Kangaroo Ridge, Mount Stilwell ridge, and Guthries Ridge is formally designated as the Charlotte Pass Alpine Resort.

It is the oldest and highest ski resort in Australia.

The resort contains five ski lifts, one triple chairlift, one T-bar, two platter lifts and a beginner's moving carpet (which replaced a rope tow in 2008), accessing 50 hectares of skiable terrain. These lifts are commonly referred to as the Kosciuszko Triple Chair, the Pulpit T-bar, the Basin Poma, Guthrie's High Speed Poma and the Kosciusko Carpet (colloquially known as the "Kosci Carpet"). The highest lifted elevation is 1,964 m; the base elevation 1,755 m; giving a downhill skier's vertical of 210 m. The resort currently only lifts to part of its leased area. A small terrain park was first constructed in 2008. The resort has a few mobile snow guns to top up high traffic areas and help open difficult terrain areas earlier in the season. A list of all ski lifts to have operated at Charlotte Pass can be found at the Australian Ski Lift Directory.

The resort is also very popular with cross-country skiers, as the village provides immediate access to Australia's highest peaks.

The resort receives, on average, more natural snow than other Australian resorts because of its elevation. In 1981, one weather event dropped snow to the extent that the Kangaroo Ridge triple chair terminus was buried in snow, over the top of the pylon, by the cornice by up to 0.5 m. This level of snow fall is an exception.

The Charlotte Pass ski area might be the only area in Australia with viable natural snow in several years' time, owing to the impact of global warming.

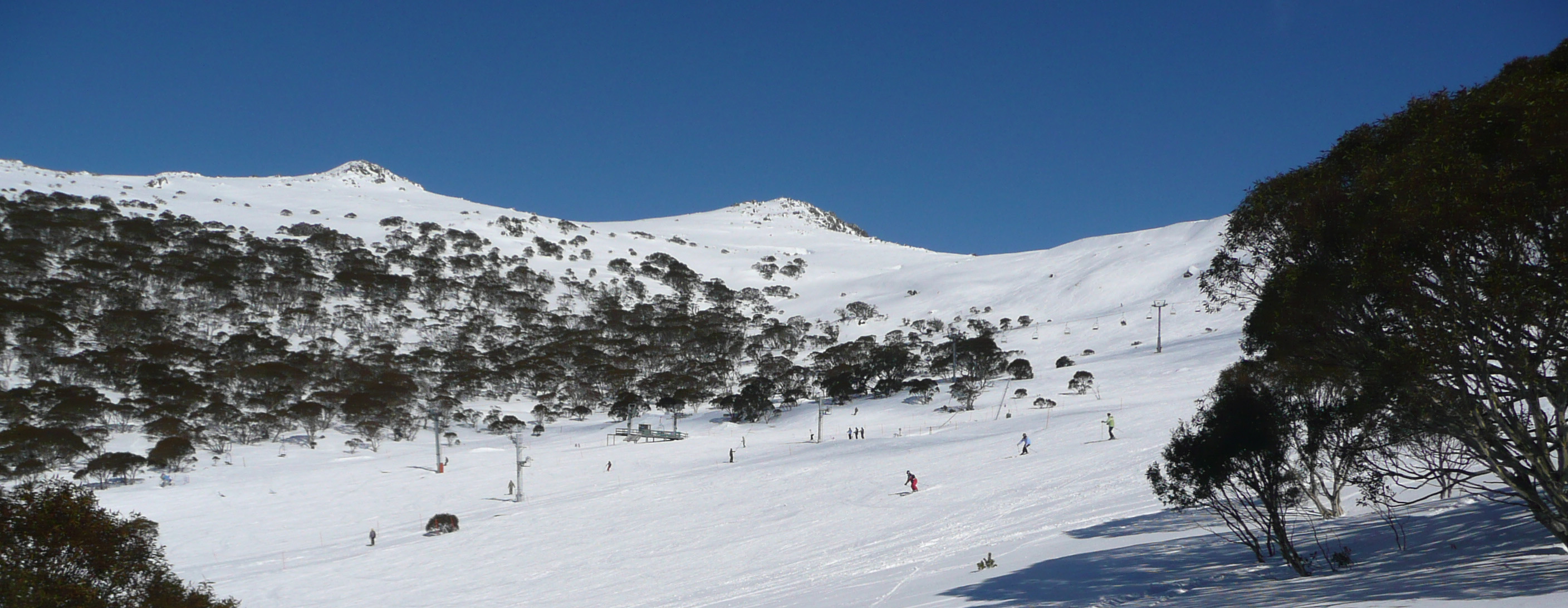

1	Mount Stillwell
2	Kangaroo Ridge
3	Little Stillwell
4	Kangaroo Ridge triple chairlift mid station

5	Basin Poma (platter lift) unload point
6	Ego flats
7	Snow gums

=== Kosciuszko Main Range walks ===
During the summer, Charlotte Pass is a base for bushwalkers with intent to walk to the top of Mount Kosciuszko and access the Main Range. The mountain can be accessed by the 18 km round trip Summit Walk, or a 22 km loop walk via the glacial Lakes Walk. A fine view of the Main Range and headwaters of the Snowy River can be seen from the Snow Gums Boardwalk at Charlotte's Pass and the walk to the summit traverses sub-alpine woodland on the Guthrie Range. Mount Kosciuszko itself is visible from the first lookout.

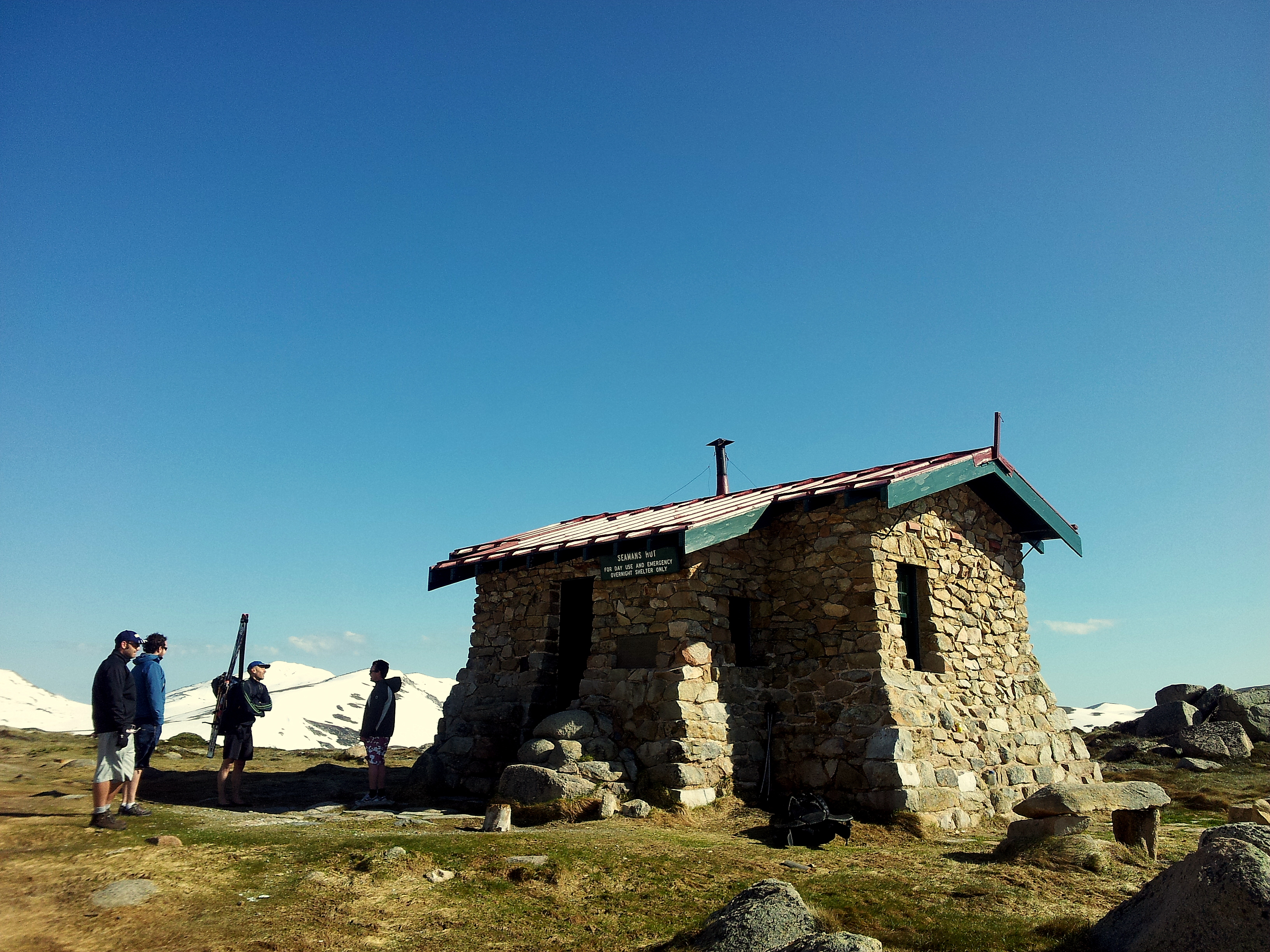
Seaman's Hut on the old Summit Road en route to Mount Kosciuszko from Charlotte Pass. (October 2013)

The Charlotte Pass to Kosciuszko walk follows the old Summit Road, which was closed to vehicles in 1976. It crosses the Snowy River at 4.5 km and then ascends gradually to Seaman's Hut (6 km), Rawson's Pass (8 km) and finally, the summit of Mount Kosciuszko.

The Charlotte Pass to Blue Lake walk crosses the Snowy River before ascending through alpine herbfields past Hedley Tarn lookout to Blue Lake lookout. The Blue Lake is one of only four cirque lakes found in mainland Australia and contains the best-developed glacial features in the Kosciuszko National Park alpine area of New South Wales. The lake can be accessed by a 4-hour round-trip walk from Charlotte Pass.

A shorter and easier walk to the Kosciuszko summit can be accessed via Thredbo. Other guided walks are also available.

== Access ==
In summer, access is by Kosciuszko Road from Jindabyne.

In winter, the area is snow-bound and can only be accessed by snowmobile from the Perisher Valley Skitube alpine railway terminal, which lies 8 kilometres to the north east, also via Jindabyne. Charlotte Pass Village Pty Ltd operates a fleet of vehicles to ferry people into and out of the village during winter.

The area has not always been regarded as being easily accessible to all people. In the mid 20th century, the Chalet at Charlotte Pass was referred to as a "breeding ground for snobocracy" by local politician John Wesley Seiffert who by public criticism obtained a reduced bus fare to the area, thus opening the snowfields to a wider range of people.

== Management and services ==
The area is subject to a wide range of government legislation and environmental plans, and, owing to the environmental sensitivity of the area, is one of the most heavily regulated areas in Australia.

Services such as garbage collection and sewage processing are the responsibility of the area's lessee.

Private services at the resort include a ski and snowboard school/instructors, over-snow transport such as Pisten Bully snow cats and a ski patrol service.

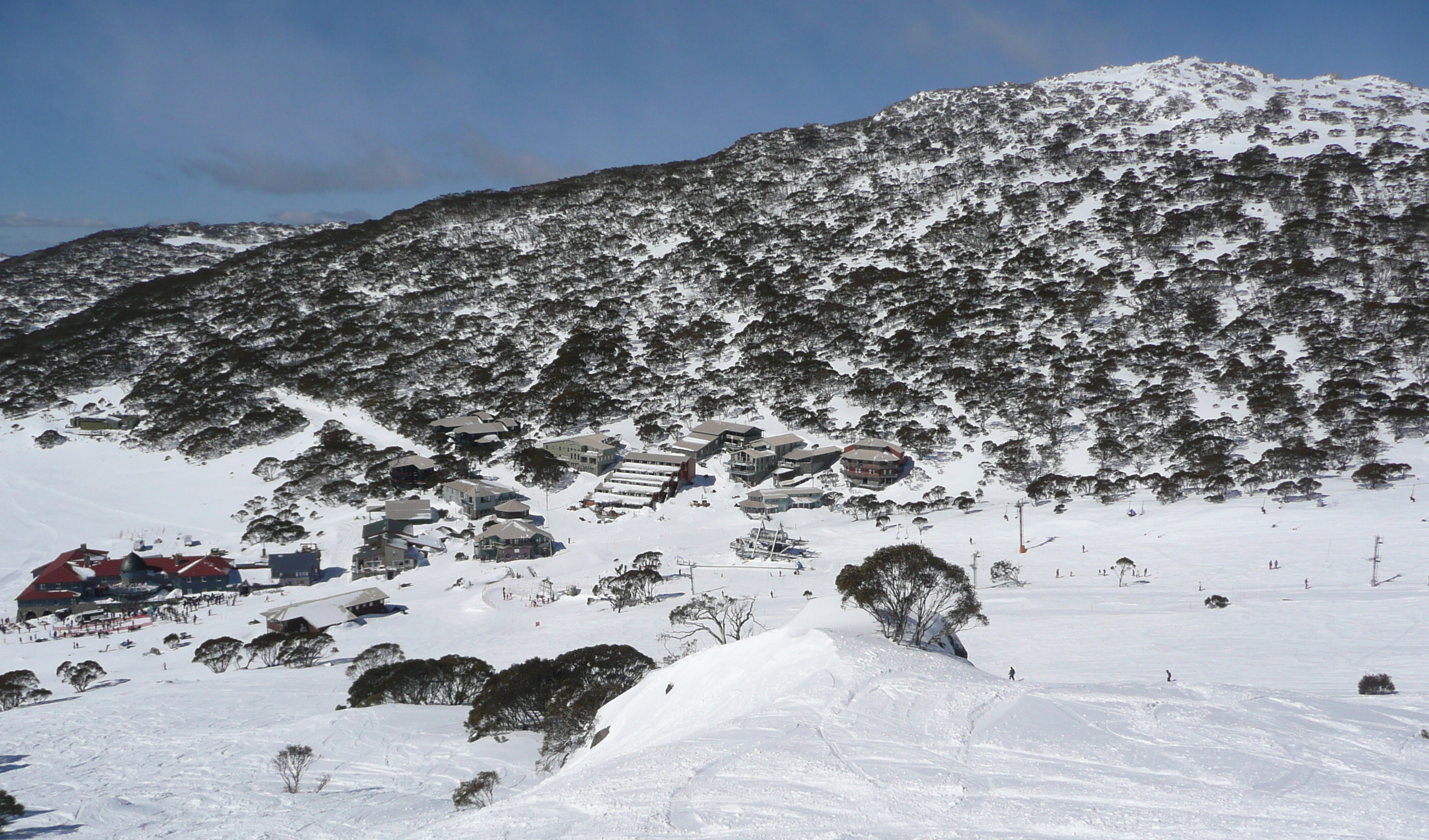
Accommodation and service buildings in Charlotte Pass Village

1	Kosciuszko Chalet Hotel
2	Charlotte Pass Ski Centre
3	Bella Vista Staff Lodge (Cell Block, Cellavista)
4	Kosciusko Alpine Club
5	Knockshannoch Lodge

6	Jerrabomberra Lodge
7	Spencer's Creek Lodge
8	Stillwell Lodge
9	Southern Alps Ski Lodge
10	Pygmy Possum Lodge

11	Snowbird Lodge
12	Arlberg Lodge
13	Burrawong Lodge
14	Lucy Lodge
15	Tar Gan Gil Lodge

Other facilities and features (Guthries Poma (platter lift) and Pulpit T-bar not shown)

16 / Sewage plant (Shakespear's Lodge); 17 / Basin Poma	18 / Kosi Carpet (Magic Carpet (moving carpet)); 19 / Kosciusko triple chairlift	20 / "Fox hole" at the eastern end of Stillwell Ridge; 21 / Workshop

== See also ==
- Skiing in Australia
- List of extreme temperatures in Australia
