= List of dams and reservoirs in Australia =

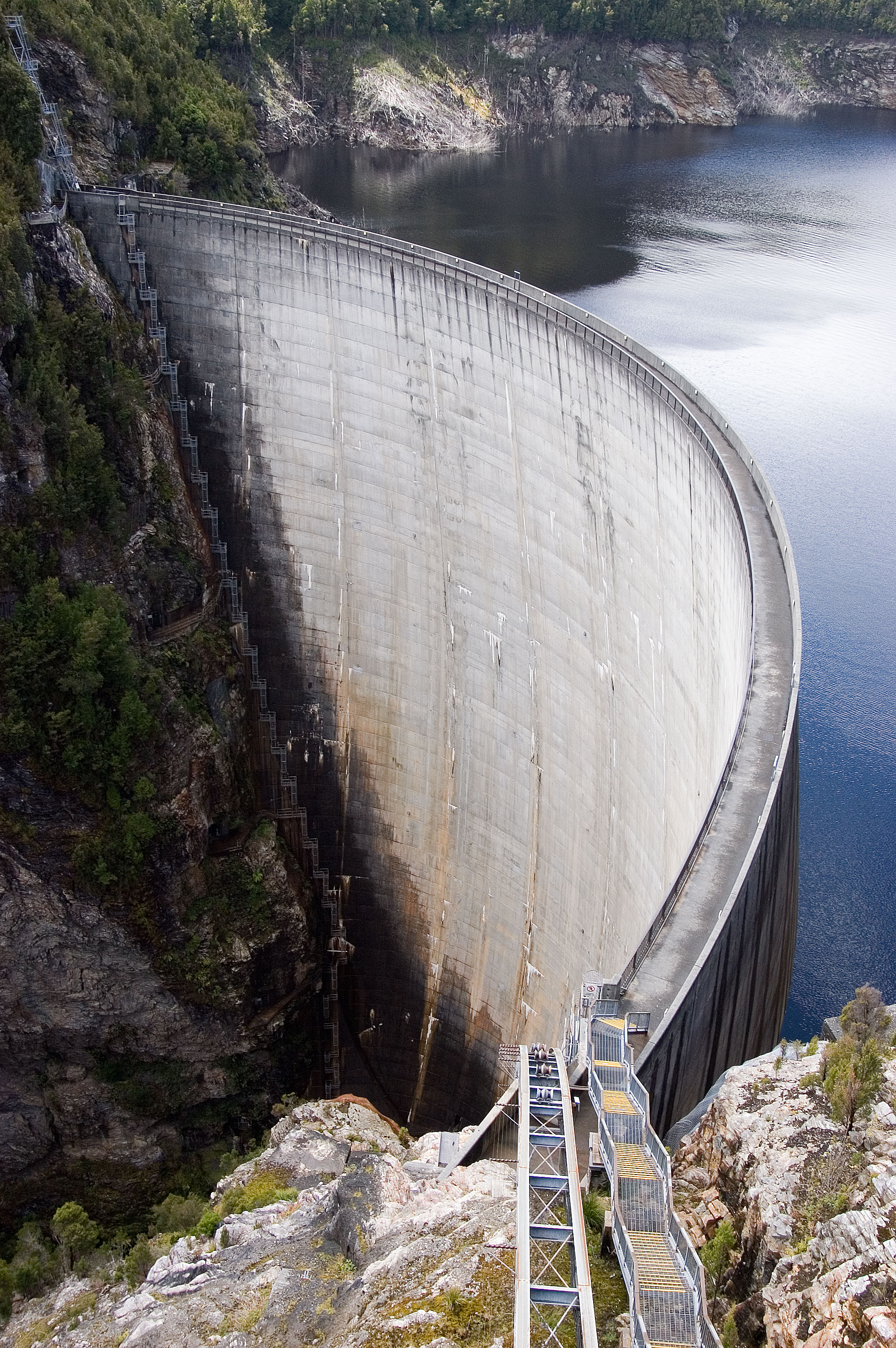
Tasmania's Gordon Dam, one of the largest in Australia, was constructed in the 1970s. It has a catchment area of 1,280 km2 (494 sq mi).

Dams and reservoirs in Australia is a link page for any dam or reservoir in Australia.

== Australian Capital Territory ==
There are three key water storage facilities in the Australian Capital Territory. The fourth source of water for Canberra, Googong Dam, is in NSW. In addition, there are four smaller man-made reservoirs used for recreation and as traps for sediment and fertilizers.

Dams and reservoirs of the Australian Capital Territory
Image	Dam name (where appropriate)	Reservoir name (where appropriate)	Region(s)	Waterway(s) impounded	Dam type	Purpose(s)	Reservoir capacity			Coordinates
Image	Dam name (where appropriate)	Reservoir name (where appropriate)	Region(s)	Waterway(s) impounded	Dam type	Purpose(s)	ML	Gal (Imp.)	Gal (US)	Coordinates
	Bendora Dam	Bendora Reservoir	Namadgi National Park	Cotter River	Arch	Water supply	11,540	2.54×10^{9}	3.05×10^{9}	35°26′49″S 148°49′41″E
	Corin Dam	Corin Reservoir	Namadgi National Park	Cotter River	Embankment	Water supply	75,500	16.6×10^{9}	19.9×10^{9}	35°33′55″S 148°49′52″E
	Cotter Dam	Cotter Reservoir		Cotter River	Gravity	Water supply	78,000	17×10^{9}	21×10^{9}	35°19′10″S 148°56′19″E
	Ginninderra Weir	Lake Ginninderra	Belconnen	Ginninderra Creek	Artificial lake	Recreation				35°14′S 149°04′E
	Scrivener Dam	Lake Burley Griffin	Yarralumla	Molonglo River	Gravity	Recreation	27,740	6.10×10^{9}	7.33×10^{9}	35°17′59″S 149°04′20″E
	n/a	Stranger Pond	Bonython	Off-stream	Artificial lake	Recreation				35°25′47″S 149°4′11″E
	Tuggeranong Dam	Lake Tuggeranong	Tuggeranong	Tuggeranong Creek	Artificial lake	Recreation				35°24′30″S 149°04′00″E

== New South Wales ==
There are 2,250 dams, weirs, catchments, and barrages in New South Wales. Of these, 135 facilities are considered major dams according to the Australian National Committee on Large Dams.

=== Dams and reservoirs ===
The largest reservoir in New South Wales is the 4,798,000-megalitre (1.055×10^{12} imp gal; 1.267×10^{12} US gal) Lake Eucumbene in the Snowy Mountains, formed by the Eucumbene Dam.

Dams and reservoirs of New South Wales
Image	Dam name (where appropriate)	Reservoir name (where appropriate)	Region(s)	Waterway(s) impounded	Dam type	Purpose(s)	Reservoir capacity			Coordinates
Image	Dam name (where appropriate)	Reservoir name (where appropriate)	Region(s)	Waterway(s) impounded	Dam type	Purpose(s)	ML	Gal (Imp.)	Gal (US)	Coordinates
	Avon Dam	Avon Storage Reservoir	Sydney – Macarthur – Illawarra	Avon River	Gravity	Water supply	214,360	4.715×10^{10}	5.663×10^{10}	34°21′05″S 150°38′28″E
	Bankstown Reservoir		Sydney – South-western Sydney		Water tower	Water supply	4.4	970,000	1,200,000	33°54′20″S 151°02′23″E
	Bamarang Dam	Bamarang Reservoir	South Coast	Pumped from Shoalhaven River at Burrier		Water supply	3,800	840×10^{6}	1,000×10^{6}	34°54′29.2″S 150°31′25.2″E
	Bendeela Pondage	Bendeela Pondage	South Coast	Kangaroo River	Embankment	Water supply	1,200	260×10^{6}	320×10^{6}	34°43′30″S 150°28′47″E
	Ben Boyd Dam		South Coast			Water Supply	800	180×10^{6}	210×10^{6}	37°07′14″S 149°51′18″E
	Ben Chifley Dam		Central West	Campbells River	Embankment	Water supply	30,800	6.8×10^{9}	8.1×10^{9}	33°32′54″S 149°38′05″E
	Blowering Dam	Blowering Reservoir	Snowy Mountains	Tumut River	Embankment	Flood mitigation Hydroelectricity; Irrigation; Water supply Conservation	1,628,000	3.58×10^{11}	4.30×10^{11}	35°24′05″S 148°14′52″E
	Brogo Dam		South Coast	Brogo River	Embankment	Environmental flows Hydroelectricity; Irrigation; Water supply	8,980	1.98×10^{9}	2.37×10^{9}	36°29′24″S 149°44′30″E
	Burrendong Dam	Lake Burrendong	Orana	Macquarie River	Embankment	Flood mitigation Hydroelectricity; Irrigation; Water supply	1,188,000	2.61×10^{11}	3.14×10^{11}	32°40′04″S 149°06′25″E
	Burrinjuck Dam	Lake Burrinjuck	Riverina	Murrumbidgee River	Gravity	Hydroelectricity; Irrigation	1,026,000	2.26×10^{11}	2.71×10^{11}	35°00′10″S 148°35′02″E
	Carcoar Dam		Central West	Belubula River	Arch	Irrigation; Water supply Water conservation	36,400	8.0×10^{9}	9.6×10^{9}	33°37′00″S 149°10′45″E
	Cascade Creek Dams	Cascade Dam	Blue Mountains	Cascade Creek	Embankment	Water supply	1,704	375×10^{6}	450×10^{6}	33°41′29″S 150°18′05″E
	Cataract Dam	Cataract Reservoir	Sydney – Macarthur – Illawarra	Cararact River	Gravity	Water supply	94,300	2.07×10^{10}	2.49×10^{10}	34°15′56″S 150°48′11″E
	Chaffey Dam	Chaffey Dam	New England	Peel River	Embankment	Irrigation; Water supply	102,868	2.2628×10^{10}	2.7175×10^{10}	31°20′45″S 151°08′19″E
	Chichester Dam	Lake Chichester	Hunter	Chichester River; Wangat River			21,500	4.7×10^{9}	5.7×10^{9}	32°14′15″S 151°41′22″E
	Clarrie Hall Dam	Lake Clarrie Hall	Northern Rivers	Doon Doon Creek			16,000	3.5×10^{9}	4.2×10^{9}	28°26′16″S 153°18′19″E
	Cochrane Dam	Cochrane Lake	South Coast	Georges Creek			385	85×10^{6}	102×10^{6}	36°33′54″S 149°27′04″E
	Copeton Dam	Lake Copeton	New England	Gwydir River	Embankment	Water Supply, Hydroelectric Power Generation and Irrigation	1,364,000	3.00×10^{11}	3.60×10^{11}	29°54′23″S 150°55′38″E
	Cordeaux Dam		Sydney – Macarthur – Illawarra	Cordeaux River	Gravity	Water supply	93,600	2.06×10^{10}	2.47×10^{10}	34°20′25″S 150°44′35″E
	Danjera Dam		South Coast	Danjera Creek (Shoalhaven catchment)		Water supply	7,600	1,700×10^{6}	2,000×10^{6}	34°55′11.9″S 150°23′10.9″E
	Deep Creek Dam	Deep Creek Reservoir	Snowy Mountains	Deep Creek			11	2.4×10^{6}	2.9×10^{6}	36°00′35.7″S 148°20′37.2″E
	Eucumbene Dam	Lake Eucumbene	Snowy Mountains	Eucumbene River	Embankment		4,798,000	1.055×10^{12}	1.267×10^{12}	
	Fitzroy Falls Dam	Fitzroy Falls Reservoir	South Coast	Yarrunga Creek	Embankment	Water supply	9,950	2.19×10^{9}	2.63×10^{9}	
	Geehi Dam	Geehi Reservoir	Snowy Mountains	Geehi River	Embankment		21,093	4.640×10^{9}	5.572×10^{9}	
	Glenbawn Dam	Lake Glenbawn	Hunter	Hunter River			750,000	1.6×10^{11}	2.0×10^{11}	
	Glennies Creek Dam	Lake St Clair	Hunter	Hunter River			283,000	6.2×10^{10}	7.5×10^{10}	
	Googong Dam	Googong Reservoir	Capital Country	Queanbeyan River			121,083	2.6635×10^{10}	3.1987×10^{10}	
	Grahamstown Dam		Hunter; Mid North Coast	Williams River		Water Supply	190,000	4.2×10^{10}	5.0×10^{10}	
	Guthega Dam	Guthega Pondage	Snowy Mountains	Snowy River	Gravity	Hydroelectricity	1,604	353×10^{6}	424×10^{6}	
	Happy Jacks Dam	Happy Jacks Pondage	Snowy Mountains	Tumut River	Gravity	Hydroelectricity	271	60×10^{6}	72×10^{6}	
	Hume Dam	Lake Hume (on border with Victoria)	Riverina	Murray River	Embankment; Gravity	Hydroelectricity; Irrigation	3,038,000	6.68×10^{11}	8.03×10^{11}	
	Island Bend Dam	Island Bend Pondage	Snowy Mountains	Snowy River	Gravity	Hydroelectricity	3,084	678×10^{6}	815×10^{6}	
	Jindabyne Dam	Lake Jindabyne	Snowy Mountains	Snowy River	Embankment	Hydroelectricity Water supply	688,000	1.51×10^{11}	1.82×10^{11}	36°26′05″S 148°37′49″E
	Jounama Dam	Jounama Pondage	Snowy Mountains	Tumut River	Embankment	Hydroelectricity	43,542	9.578×10^{9}	1.1503×10^{10}	
	Keepit Dam	Lake Keepit	New England	Namoi River		Irrigation	425,510	9.360×10^{10}	1.1241×10^{11}	
	Khancoban Dam	Khancoban Reservoir	Snowy Mountains	Swampy Plain River	Embankment	Hydroelectricity	26,643	5.861×10^{9}	7.038×10^{9}	
	Lake Rowlands Dam	Lake Rowlands	Central West	Coombing Rivulet	Concrete slab and buttress	Water supply	4,500	990×10^{6}	1,200×10^{6}	33°40′16″S 149°10′35″E
	Liverpool Offtake Reservoir	Cecil Hills	South West Sydney	fed from canal	embankment	Water supply	170	37×10^{6}	45×10^{6}	33°53′24″S 150°49′36″E
	Lostock Dam	Lostock Dam	Hunter	Paterson River	Embankment	Water Supply	20,220	4.45×10^{9}	5.34×10^{9}	
	Lyell Dam	Lake Lyell	Central West	Coxs River		Water Supply	34,500	7.6×10^{9}	9.1×10^{9}	
	Malpas Dam	Malpas Reservoir	New England	Gara River		Water Supply	13,000	2.9×10^{9}	3.4×10^{9}	
	Mangrove Creek Dam		Central Coast	Mangrove Creek		Water Supply	190,000	4.2×10^{10}	5.0×10^{10}	
	Manly Dam	Manly Reservoir	Sydney – Northern Beaches	Curl Curl Creek	Gravity	Flood Mitigation	2,000	440×10^{6}	530×10^{6}	33°46′53″S 151°15′21″E
	Medlow Dam	Medlow Bath Reservoir	Blue Mountains	Adams Creek	Blue Mountains	Water supply	304.5	67,000×10^{3}	80,400×10^{3}	33°39′30″S 150°17′57″E
	Murray Two Dam	Murray Two Pondage	Snowy Mountains	Khancoban Bank	Arch	Hydroelectricity	2,344	516×10^{6}	619×10^{6}	
	Nepean Dam		Sydney – Macarthur – Illawarra	Nepean River	Arch gravity	Water supply	70,170	1.544×10^{10}	1.854×10^{10}	34°19′55″S 150°37′05″E
	Oberon Dam	Lake Oberon	Central West	Fish River		Water Supply	45,420	9.99×10^{9}	1.200×10^{10}	
	Pindari Dam	Lake Pindari	North West Slopes			Hydroelectricity	312,000	6.9×10^{10}	8.2×10^{10}	
	Porters Creek Dam		South Coast	Porters Creek (Clyde River catchment)	Gravity	Water supply	1,900	420×10^{6}	500×10^{6}	35°15′52.5″S 150°19′58.2″E
	Prospect Dam	Prospect Reservoir	Sydney – Western suburbs	Prospect Creek	Embankment	Water Supply	50,200	1.10×10^{10}	1.33×10^{10}	
	Rocky Creek Dam		Northern Rivers	Rocky Creek		Water supply	14,000	3.1×10^{9}	3.7×10^{9}	
	Rydal Dam		Central Tablelands			Power station cooling	370	81×10^{6}	98×10^{6}	
	Split Rock Dam	Split Rock Reservoir	New England	Manilla River		Irrigation	397,370	8.741×10^{10}	1.0497×10^{11}	
	Spring Creek Dam		Central West	Spring Creek	Minor embankment	Water supply	4,680	1.03×10^{9}	1.24×10^{9}	
	Stephens Creek Dam	Stephens Creek Reservoir	Far West	Stephens Creek	Gravity	Water supply	2,000	440×10^{6}	530×10^{6}	31°52′42″S 141°35′40″E
	Suma Park Dam	Suma Park Reservoir	Central West	Summer Hill Creek		Water Supply	17,290	3.80×10^{9}	4.57×10^{9}	
	Talbingo Dam	Talbingo Reservoir	Snowy Mountains	Tumut River	Embankment	Hydroelectricity	921,000	2.03×10^{11}	2.43×10^{11}	
	Tallowa Dam	Lake Yarrunga	South Coast	Shoalhaven River	Gravity	Water supply	90,000	2.0×10^{10}	2.4×10^{10}	34°46′22″S 150°18′48″E
	Tantangara Dam	Tantangara Reservoir	Snowy Mountains	Murrumbidgee River	Gravity	Hydroelectricity	254,099	5.5894×10^{10}	6.7126×10^{10}	
	Tilba Dam		South Coast				90	20×10^{6}	24×10^{6}	
	Tooma Dam	Tooma Reservoir	Snowy Mountains	Tooma River	Embankment	Hydroelectricity	28,124	6.186×10^{9}	7.430×10^{9}	36°03′03.4″S 148°16′30.5″E
	Toonumbar Dam	Lake Toonumbar	Northern Rivers	Iron Pot Creek		Water Supply	1,100	240×10^{6}	290×10^{6}	
	Tumut Pond Dam	Tumut Pond Reservoir	Snowy Mountains	Tumut River			52,793	1.1613×10^{10}	1.3946×10^{10}	
	Tumut Two Dam	Tumut Two Reservoir	Snowy Mountains	Tumut River	Gravity	Hydroelectricity	2,677	589×10^{6}	707×10^{6}	
	Umberumberka Dam	Umberumberka Reservoir	Far West	Umberumberka Creek	Gravity	Water Supply	1,950	430×10^{6}	520×10^{6}	31°48′49″S 141°12′38″E
	Warragamba Dam	Lake Burragorang	Sydney – Macarthur	Coxs River; Kowmung River; Nattai River; Wingecarribee River; Wollondilly River; Warragamba River	Gravity	Water Supply	2,027,000	4.46×10^{11}	5.35×10^{11}	33°52′59″S 150°35′44″E
	Wentworth Falls Lake	Wentworth Falls	Blue Mountains	Jamison Creek		NSWGR				33°42′13″S 150°22′19″E
	Wilson Park Dam	Wentworth Falls	Blue Mountains	Jamison Creek		NSWGR				33°42′40″S 150°22′27″E
	Windamere Dam	Lake Windamere	Central West	Cudgegong River		Irrigation	368,120	8.098×10^{10}	9.725×10^{10}	32°43′40″S 149°46′25″E
	Wingecarribee Dam	Wingecarribee Reservoir	South Coast	Wingecarribee River	Embankment	Water supply	25,875	5.692×10^{9}	6.835×10^{9}	34°32′29″S 150°28′55″E
	Woodford Creek Dam		Blue Mountains	Woodford Creek		Water Supply	1,431	315×10^{6}	378×10^{6}	
	Woronora Dam	Woronora Reservoir	Sydney – Southern Sydney Sutherland Shire	Woronora River			71,790	1.579×10^{10}	1.896×10^{10}	
	Wyangala Dam	Lake Wyangala	Central West	Lachlan River	Embankment	Flood mitigation Hydroelectricity; Irrigation; Water supply	1,220,000	2.7×10^{11}	3.2×10^{11}	33°58′23″S 148°57′02″E
	Yellow Pinch Dam	Yellow Pinch Dam	South Coast	Yellow Pinch Creek	Embankment	Water supply	3,000	660×10^{6}	790×10^{6}	36°49′55″S 149°48′04″E

=== Weirs and barrages ===
Weir/barrage name	Region(s)	Coordinates
Bonshaw Weir	North West Slopes	28.985823°S 151.276757°E
Broughtons Pass Weir	Upper Nepean	34.227666°S 150.742509°E
Inverell Weir	North West Slopes	29.792235°S 151.137205°E
Marom Creek Weir	Northern Rivers	28.849765°S 153.390965°E
Penrith Weir	Western Sydney	33.741337°S 150.684555°E
Pheasants Nest Weir	Upper Nepean	34.245065°S 150.666879°E
Tareelaroi Weir	North West Slopes	29.447109°S 150.038009°E

=== Cancelled and decommissioned ===
Image	Dam/reservoir name (where appropriate)	Region(s)	Status	Coordinates (where appropriate)
	Balmain Reservoir	Sydney – Inner West	Decommissioned	33°51′32″S 151°10′56″E
	Centennial Park Reservoir	Sydney		
	Gosling Creek Dam	Central West	Decommissioned in 1962	33°18′54″S 149°05′04″E
	Paddington Reservoir	Sydney	Decommissioned in 1899	
	Tillegra Dam	Hunter	Proposed and cancelled in 2010	32°19′13″S 151°41′10″E

== Northern Territory ==
There are 805 named water storage facilities in the Northern Territory. Of these, four facilities are considered major dams according to the Australian National Committee on Large Dams.

Dams of the Northern Territory
Image	Dam name (where appropriate)	Reservoir name (where appropriate)	Region(s)	Waterway(s) impounded	Dam type	Purpose(s)	Reservoir capacity	Coordinates
	Copperfield Dam			Copperfield Creek	Embankment	Water supply	500 ML (110×10^{6} imp gal; 130×10^{6} US gal)	
	Darwin River Dam			Darwin River	Embankment	Water supply	265,500 ML (58.4×10^{9} imp gal; 70.1×10^{9} US gal)	12°53′45″S 131°02′20″E
	Manton Dam			Manton River	Arch	Recreation	15,910 ML (3.50×10^{9} imp gal; 4.20×10^{9} US gal)	12°51′32″S 131°07′12″E
	Mary Ann Dam	Lake Mary Ann	Tennant Creek	Mary Ann Creek	Embankment	Recreation	450 ML (99×10^{6} imp gal; 120×10^{6} US gal)	19°36′36″S 134°12′42″E

== Queensland ==
=== Dams and reservoirs ===
There are 183 key water storage facilities located in Queensland. These facilities represent a total capacity of 13,389 gigalitres (2,945×10^{9} imp gal; 3,537×10^{9} US gal) for Queensland. This does not include privately owned off-stream storage sites used for water harvesting.

Dams of Queensland
Image	Dam name (where appropriate)	Reservoir name (where appropriate)	Region(s)	Waterway(s) impounded	Dam type	Purpose(s)	Reservoir capacity			Coordinates		
Image	Dam name (where appropriate)	Reservoir name (where appropriate)	Region(s)	Waterway(s) impounded	Dam type	Purpose(s)	ML	Gal (Imp.)	Gal (US)	Coordinates		
	Atkinson Dam	Lake Atkinson	South East – West Moreton	Buaraba Creek	Embankment	Irrigation	30,500	6.7×10^{9}	8.1×10^{9}	27°25′42″S 152°26′39″E		
Awoonga Dam Wall	Awoonga Dam	Lake Awoonga	Fitzroy	Boyne River	Embankment	Water Supply and Recreation	777,000	171×10^{9}	205×10^{9}	24°07′53″S 151°30′8″E		
	Bamboo Dam	Lake Bamboo	North	Bamboo Creek	Embankment	Recreation						
	Baroon Pocket Dam	Lake Baroon	South East – Sunshine Coast	Obi Obi Creek	Embankment	Water supply	61,000	13×10^{9}	16×10^{9}	26°42′12″S 152°52′5″E		
	Belmore Dam	Lake Belmore	Far North	Belmore Creek	Embankment	Water Supply and Recreation	5,800	1.3×10^{9}	1.5×10^{9}	18°10′45″S 142°15′41″E		
	Biggera Creek Dam		South East – Gold Coast	Biggera Creek	Embankment	Flood mitigation	2,980	660×10^{6}	790×10^{6}	810×10^{6}	980×10^{6}	27°56′54″S 153°22′59″E
	Bill Gunn Dam	Lake Dyer	South East – Lockyer Valley	Off-stream	Embankment	Irrigation	6,940	1,530×10^{6}	1,830×10^{6}	27°37′40″S 152°22′37″E		
	Bjelke-Petersen Dam	Lake Barambah	South East – South Burnett	Barker Creek	Embankment	Water Supply and Irrigation	134,900	29,700×10^{6}	35,600×10^{6}			
	Boondooma Dam	Lake Boondooma	South East – South Burnett	Boyne River	Embankment	Water Supply and Power Station	134,900	29,700×10^{6}	35,600×10^{6}			
	Boobir Dam		South East – South Burnett	Boobir Creek	Embankment	Water Supply	179	39×10^{6}	47×10^{6}			
	Borumba Dam	Lake Borumba	South East – Gympie	Yabba Creek	Embankment	Irrigation and Water Supply	33,300	7,300×10^{6}	8,800×10^{6}			
	Bromelton Dam	Bromelton Offstream Storage	South East – Beaudesert	Off-stream	Embankment	Water supply	8,210	1,810×10^{6}	2,170×10^{6}	27°56′44″S 152°57′14″E		
	Burdekin Falls Dam	Lake Dalrymple	North	Burdekin River	Gravity	Irrigation & Water supply	1,860,000	410,000×10^{6}	490,000×10^{6}			
	Burton Gorge Dam			Isaac River	RCC Gravity	Water supply	14,829					
	Callide Dam			Callide Creek	Embankment	Water Supply	136,370					
	Cania Dam			Three Moon Creek	Embankment	Irrigation and Water Supply	88,580					
	Cedar Pocket Dam			Deep Creek	Concrete gravity and rock embankment	Irrigation	730					
	Lake Clarendon Dam	Lake Clarendon	South East – Lockyer Valley	Off-stream	Embankment	Irrigation	24,330	5.35×10^{9}	6.43×10^{9}	27°30′56″S 152°21′4″E		
	Connolly Dam			Rosenthal Creek	Embankment	Water Supply	2,157					
	Cooby Dam	Cooby Creek Reservoir		Cooby Creek	Concrete faced rockfill	Water Supply	23,100					
	Coolmunda Dam	Lake Coolmunda		Macintyre Brook	Ebankment	Irrigation and Water Supply	69,090					
	Cooloolabin Dam			Rocky Creek	Concrete Gravity	Water Supply	8,183					
	Copperlode Falls Dam	Lake Morris		Freshwater Creek	Earth embankment	Water Supply	38,475					
	Corella Dam	Lake Corella		Corella River	Rockfill Embankment	Water Supply	10,500					
	Cressbrook Dam	Lake Cressbrook		Cressbrook Creek	Earthfill Embankment	Water Supply	81,800					
	East Leichhardt Dam			East Leichhardt River		Water Supply	12,100					
	E.J. Beardmore Dam	Lake Kajarabie		Balonne River	Earth and rockfill embankment	Irrigation and Water Supply	81,800					
	Enoggera Dam	Enoggera Reservoir	South East – Brisbane	Enoggera Creek	Earth-fill	Water supply	4,567	1,005×10^{6}	1,206×10^{6}	990×10^{6}	1,200×10^{6}	27°26′50″S 152°56′37″E
	Eungella Dam			Broken River	Earth and rockfill	Irrigation and Mining	112,400					
	Ewen Maddock Dam		South East – Sunshine Coast	Addlington Creek	Embankment	Water supply	16,587	3.649×10^{9}	4.382×10^{9}	3.65×10^{9}	4.38×10^{9}	26°40′51″S 153°0′22″E
	Fairbairn Dam	Lake Maraboon	Central Queensland	Nogoa River	Embankment	Irrigation; Water supply Flood mitigation	1,301,000	286×10^{9}	344×10^{9}	23°39′00″S 148°03′56″E		
	Fred Haigh Dam	Lake Monduran		Kolan River	Earthfill embankment	Irrigation and Water Supply	562,045					
	Gattonvale Offstream Storage					Water Supply	5,200					
	Glenlyon Dam	Pike Creek Reservoir		Pike Creek	Earth and rockfill embankment	Irrigation	254,000					
	Gold Creek Dam	Gold Creek Reservoir	South East – Brisbane	Gold Creek	Embankment	Water supply	801	176×10^{6}	212×10^{6}	27°27′39″S 152°52′52″E		
	Gordonbrook Dam			Stuart River	Earthfill embankment	Water Supply	6,800					
	(no dam)	Green Hill Reservoir	Chapel Hill, Queensland				155	34×10^{6}	41×10^{6}			
	Hinze Dam	Advancetown Lake	South East – Gold Coast	Nerang River	Embankment	Water supply Flood mitigation	310,730	68.35×10^{9}	82.09×10^{9}	28°3′2″S 153°17′2″E		
	Ibis Dam			Ibis Creek	Concrete Gravity	Water Supply	225					
	Irvinebank Dam			Gibbs Creek	Timber and Concrete Weir	Water Supply	150					
	Julius Dam	Lake Julius		Leichhardt River	Multiple arch concrete buttress	Industrial and Town Water Supply	107,500					
	Kidston Dam	Copperfield Dam		Copperfield River	Roller compacted concrete	Water Supply, Recreation, Pumped Hydro	20,600					
	Kinchant Dam			Sandy Creek	Earth and rockfill embankment	Irrigation	72,235					
	Kroombit Dam			Kroombit Creek	Roller Compacted Concrete	Groundwater Recharge	14,600					
	Koombooloomba Dam			Tully River	Concrete Gravity	Hydroelectricity	186,750					
	Lake Gregory	Isis Balancing Storage			Earthfill embankment	Irrigation	6,160					
	Lake Manchester Dam	Lake Manchester	South East – Ipswich	Cabbage Tree Creek	Gravity	Water supply Recreation	26,000	5.7×10^{9}	6.9×10^{9}	27°29′17″S 152°45′5″E		
	Lenthalls Dam	Lake Lenthall		Burrum River	Earthfill embankment	Water Supply	28,411					
	Leslie Dam	Lake Leslie		Sandy Creek	Concrete Gravity	Irrigation and Water Supply	106,250					
	Leslie Harrison Dam	Tingalpa Reservoir	South East – Brisbane	Tingalpa Creek	Embankment	Water supply	13,206	2.905×10^{9}	3.489×10^{9}	5.470×10^{9}	6.569×10^{9}	27°31′41″S 153°10′49″E
	Little Nerang Dam		South East – Gold Coast	Little Nerang Creek	Gravity	Water supply	8,390	1.85×10^{9}	2.22×10^{9}	28°8′37″S 153°17′8″E		
	Maroon Dam		South East – Scenic Rim	Burnett Creek	Embankment	Irrigation	44,300	9.7×10^{9}	11.7×10^{9}	28°10′51″S 152°39′25″E		
	Middle Creek Dam			Plane Creek	Earthfill embankment	Water Supply	1,120					
	Moogerah Dam	Lake Moogerah	South East – Fassifern Valley	Reynolds Creek	Arch	Irrigation; Water supply	83,700	18.4×10^{9}	22.1×10^{9}	28°1′48″S 152°32′56″E		
	Moondarra Dam	Lake Moondarra		Leichardt River	Concrete-faced rockfill embankment	Mine and urban water supply	106,833					
	Meandu Creek Dam			Meandu Creek	Zoned earthfill	Irrigation and power station cooling water	3,000					
	North Pine Dam	Lake Samsonvale	South East – Moreton Bay	North Pine River	Gravity	Water supply	214,302	47.140×10^{9}	56.613×10^{9}	27°15′48″S 152°56′12″E		
	Number 7 Dam	Big Dam No 7, Mount Morgan		Dee River	Mass concrete gravity	Water supply	2,830					
	Paluma Dam			Swamp Creek	Earth core rock embankment	Water supply	11,830					
	Paradise Dam		Wide-Bay	Burnett River	Gravity	Irrigation	300,000	6.6×10^{10}	7.9×10^{10}	25°21′04″S 151°55′10″E		
	Perseverance Dam	Lake Perseverance		Perseverance Creek	Zoned earth and rockfill	Water supply	30,140					
Peter Faust Dam	Peter Faust Dam	Lake Proserpine	Mackay–Whitsunday	Proserpine River	Embankment	Urban Water Supply, Irrigation & Recreation	491,400	108.1×10^{9}	129.8×10^{9}	20.3673°S 148.378°E		
	Placer Dam	Perry River Dam		Perry River	Roller compacted concrete embankment	Mine water supply	1,050					
	Poona Dam		South East – Sunshine Coast	South Maroochy River	Embankment	Water storage	655	144×10^{6}	173×10^{6}	26°35′46″S 152°54′36″E		
	Return Creek Dam	Crooks Dam		Return Creek	Earthfill embankment	Stock water supply and recreation	1,045					
	Rifle Creek Dam			Rifle Creek	Concrete arch	Urban and mine water supply	9,500					
	Ross River Dam		North: Townsville		Embankment	Water supply Flood mitigation	233,187					
	Sideling Creek Dam	Lake Kurwongbah	South East – Moreton Bay	Sideling Creek	Embankment	Water supply Recreation	14,500	3.2×10^{9}	3.8×10^{9}	27°15′28″S 152°57′7″E		
	Six Mile Creek Dam	Lake Macdonald	South East – Sunshine Coast	Six Mile Creek	Embankment	Water supply Recreation	8,018	1.764×10^{9}	2.118×10^{9}	26°22′52″S 152°55′48″E		
	Solomon Dam		Palm Island			Water Supply						
	Somerset Dam	Lake Somerset	South East – Somerset Region	Stanley River	Gravity	Water supply Flood mitigation Recreation; Hydroelectricity	379,849	83.555×10^{9}	100.345×10^{9}	199×10^{9}	239×10^{9}	27°6′52″S 152°33′25″E
	Southedge Dam			Mitchell River	Embankment	Recreation and water supply	159,120					
	Splityard Creek Dam		South East – Somerset Region	Pryde Creek	Embankment	Hydroelectricity	28,700	6,300×10^{6}	7,600×10^{6}	27°22′16″S 152°38′13″E		
	Stannary Hills Dam			Eureka Creek		Mining	340					
	Tallebudgera Creek Dam		South East – Gold Coast	Tallebudgera Creek	Earthfill embankment	Water supply	360					
	Teemburra Dam			Teemburra Creek	Concrete faced rockfill embankment	Irrigation, Urban and Industrial water supply	147,500					
	Theresa Creek Dam			Theresa Creek	Concrete gravity	Town water Supply and recreation	9,200					
	Tinaroo Dam	Lake Tinaroo		Barron River	Mass concrete gravity	Irrigation	438,920					
	Teviot Creek Dam				Roller compacted concrete	Mining	24,000					
	Wappa Dam		South East – Sunshine Coast	South Maroochy River	Gravity	Water supply	4,610	1,010×10^{6}	1,220×10^{6}	26°34′12″S 152°55′19″E		
	Wild River Dam	Herberton Dam		Wild River	Earth and rockfill embankment	Town water supply	290					
	Wivenhoe Dam	Lake Wivenhoe	South East – Brisbane/Gold Coast	Brisbane River	Embankment	Water supply Flood mitigation Hydroelectricity; Recreation	1,165,238	256.317×10^{9}	307.823×10^{9}	27°23′38″S 152°36′28″E		
	Wuruma Dam			Nogo River	Mass concrete gravity	Irrigation and town water supply	165,400					
	Wyaralong Dam		South East – Scenic Rim	Teviot Brook	Gravity	Water supply	102,883	22,631×10^{6}	27,179×10^{6}	27°54′33″S 152°52′52″E		

=== Weirs and barrages ===
Name	Coordinates
Allan Tannock Weir (Cunnamulla Weir)	28.1174°S 145.686°E
Aplins Weir	19.304°S 146.781°E
Avis Weir	24.9794°S 151.123°E
Baron River Hydro Weir	16.8311°S 145.640°E
Bazley Weir	24.8937°S 151.123°E
Bedford Weir	23.3716°S 148.841°E
Ben Anderson Barrage	24.8885°S 152.2899°E
Ben Dor Weir	28.5642°S 150.866°E
Bonshaw Weir	28.9857°S 151.277°E
Bingegang Weir	23.0726°S 149.0340°E
Bingera Weir	24.9431°S 152.213°E
Blacks Weir	19.3170°S 146.7360°E
Blue Valley Weir	20.4081°S 147.393°E
Bowen River Weir	20.7461°S 147.9390°E
Brightview Weir	27.4966°S 152.501°E
Bromleton Weir	28.0066°S 152.946°E
Bruce Weir	17.1108°S 145.116°E
Buaraba Creek Weir	27.4104°S 152.419°E
Bucca Weir	24.8596°S 152.073°E
Buckinbah Weir	28.0868°S 148.767°E
Carpendale Grove Weir	27.5712°S 152.1566°E
Cedar Grove Weir	27.8465°S 152.975°E
Cecil Weir	27.5342°S 151.203°E
Charters Towers Weir	19.9662°S 146.307°E
Chinchilla Weir	26.8013°S 150.577°E
Churchbank Weir	27.7714°S 152.684°E
Clare Weir	19.8574°S 147.236°E
Claredon Weir	27.5267°S 152.375°E
Claude Wharton Weir	25.6157°S 151.594°E
Collins Weir	17.258°S 145.294°E
Comet River Weir	23.6137°S 148.551°E
Crump Weir	24.8204°S 149.748°E
Dulbil Weir	17.0422°S 145.472°E
Dumbleton Weir	21.1426°S 149.077°E
Eden Bann Weir	23.0907°S 150.116°E
Fitzroy River Barrage (Queensland)	23.3608°S 150.498°E
Fletcher Creek Weir	23.7632°S 150.367°E
Flagstone Creek Weir	27.6161°S 152.113°E
Francis Weir	26.30°S 152.04°E
Gatton Weir	27.5600°S 152.2550°E
Giru Weir	19.5102°S 147.1130°E
Glebe Weir	25.4649°S 150.035°E
Gleesons Weir	19.3177°S 146.745°E
Glenore Weir	17.8609°S 141.130°E
Glenore Grove Weir	27.5185°S 152.405°E
Goondiwindi Weir	28.550°S 150.25°E
Gorge Weir	20.4727°S 147.29°E
Granite Creek Weir	17.016°S 145.376°E
Grantham Weir	27.5755°S 152.217°E
Gyranda Weir	25.2834°S 150.182°E
Imbil Weir	26.4582°S 152.684°E

Name	Coordinates
Intake Weir	26.5833°S 152.883°E
Jack Taylor Weir	28.04395°S 148.56721°E
Joe Sippel Weir	26.2687°S 152.007°E
John Goleby Weir	25.2549°S 151.148°E
Jones Weir	25.5945°S 151.297°E
Jordan's Weir	27.5421°S 152.320°E
Junction Weir	27.9356°S 152.5980°E
Kentville Weir	27.4927°S 152.438°E
Kilcoy Weir	26.9199°S 152.5820°E
Kirar Weir (Eidsvold)	25.3525°S 151.072°E
Kolan Barrage	24.741°S 152.164°E
Leafgold Weir	17.1488°S 145.053°E
Lower Flagstone Creek Weir	27.5923°S 152.142°E
Lower Tenthill Weir	27.5929°S 152.236°E
McCauley Weir	26.754070°S 152.079655°E
Ma Ma Weir	27.6568°S 152.1610°E
Maleny Weir	26.750°S 152.833°E
Marian Weir	21.1399°S 148.937°E
Mary Barrage	25.58733°S 152.62366°E
Mirani Weir	21.1768°S 148.830°E
Monto Weir	24.858°S 151.106°E
Moolabah Weir	27.99112°S 148.73498°E
Moura Weir	24.5895°S 149.902°E
Mount Crosby Weir	27.5374°S 152.798°E
Mulgildie Weir	25.0189°S 151.093°E
Mulgowie Weir	27.7533°S 152.372°E
Mungungo Weir	24.7641°S 151.1600°E
Murgon Weir	26.265°S 151.915°E
Nanango Weir	26.6502°S 151.9240°E
Ned Churchward Weir	25.0509°S 152.0980°E
Neil Turner Weir	26.47096°S 147.95891°E
Neville Hewitt Weir	24.1714°S 149.8140°E
Orange Creek Weir	24.96250°S 150.07317°E
O'Reillys Weir	27.4180°S 152.5910°E
Proston Weir	26.2007°S 151.547°E
Sandy Creek Weir	27.6371°S 152.332°E
Selma Weir	22.542°S 148.146°E
Silverleaf Weir	26.1659°S 151.814°E
Solarnum Weir	17.2039°S 145.064°E
Tartrus Weir	22.9571°S 149.4220°E
Talgai Weir	27.991°S 151.758°E
Tenthill Weir	27.6376°S 152.216°E
Teddington Weir	25.6501°S 152.666°E
Theodore Weir	24.9502°S 150.0666°E
Tinana Barrage	25.5695°S 152.7190°E
Val Bird Weir	19.5637°S 147.096°E
Walla Weir	25.052°S 152.099°E
Whetstone Weir	28.4669°S 150.955°E
Wilson Weir	27.5397°S 152.342°E
Yarramalong Weir	27.8353°S 151.4499°E
Youlambie Weir	24.8192°S 151.096°E

== South Australia ==
=== Adelaide catchment ===
- Barossa Reservoir – The Whispering Wall
- Clarendon Weir
- Happy Valley Reservoir
- Hope Valley Reservoir
- Kangaroo Creek Reservoir
- Little Para Reservoir
- Millbrook Reservoir
- Mount Bold Reservoir
- Myponga Reservoir
- South Para Reservoir
- Thorndon Park Reservoir (Adelaide's first reservoir, built in 1860, decommissioned and reestablished as a recreational park in 1986)
- Warren Reservoir

=== Regional South Australia ===
- Aroona Dam
- Baroota Reservoir
- Beetaloo Reservoir
- Bundaleer Reservoir
- Blue Lake
- Goolwa Barrages
- Hindmarsh Valley
- Middle River Reservoir
- Tod Reservoir

== Tasmania ==
There are 103 dams in Tasmania. Of these, 100 facilities are considered major dams according to the Australian National Committee on Large Dams. The largest reservoir in Tasmania is the 12,359-gigalitre (2,719×10^{9} imp gal; 3,265×10^{9} US gal) Lake Gordon in the South West region of the state, formed by the Gordon Dam. As of 2015, 44 per cent of all the dams in Tasmania were constructed for the purpose of generating hydro-electricity.

Dams and reservoirs in Tasmania
Dam name	Image	Reservoir name	Region(s)	Waterway(s) impounded	Reservoir capacity		Coordinates
Dam name	Image	Reservoir name	Region(s)	Waterway(s) impounded	ML	acre.ft	Coordinates
Anthony Dam		Lake Plimsoll	West Coast	Anthony River	36,180	29,330	
Anthony Levee		Lake Plimsoll	West Coast	off stream	36,180	29,330	
Augusta Dam		Lake Augusta		Ouse River	23,450	19,010	
Bastyan Dam		Lake Rosebery	West Coast	Pieman River	123,520	100,140	43°43′48″S 145°31′48″E
Bastyan Levee		Lake Rosebery	West Coast	off stream	123,520	100,140	
		Bradys Lake					
Briseis Dam			North East				
Cascade Dam			North East	Cascade River			41°10′14″S 147°49′20″E
Catagunya Dam		Lake Catagunya	Central Highlands	River Derwent	25,640	20,790	42°26′24″S 146°35′24″E
Cethana Dam		Lake Cethana	Northern	Forth River	112,210	90,970	41°22′47″S 146°08′01″E
Clarence Dam							
Clark Dam		Lake King William	Central Highlands	River Derwent	539,340	437,250	42°15′36″S 146°15′36″E
Cluny Dam		Cluny Lagoon	Central Highlands	River Derwent	4,880	3,960	42°30′00″S 146°40′48″E
Craigbourne Dam			South	Coal River	12,500	10,100	42°33′09″S 147°23′38″E
Crotty Dam		Lake Burbury	West Coast	King River	1,081,420	876,720	42°09′35″S 145°37′00″E
		Curries River Reservoir					
Darwin Dam		Lake Burbury	West Coast	off stream	1,081,420	876,720	42°12′36″S 145°36′36″E
Devils Gate Dam		Lake Barrington	Northern	Forth River	179,940	145,880	41°20′24″S 146°15′36″E
Edgar Dam		Lake Pedder	South West	off river	2,937,930	2,381,820	43°01′48″S 146°20′24″E
Risdon Zinc Works							
Flagstaff Gully Dam							
Ford Dam							
Frome Dam			North East	Frome River			41°08′41″S 147°54′42″E
Gordon Dam		Lake Gordon	South West	Gordon River	12,359,040	10,019,640	42°43′50″S 145°58′35″E
Miena Rockfill Dam		Great Lake	Central Northern	Shannon River	3,156,640	2,559,130	41°58′48″S 146°43′48″E
		Guide River Reservoir					
Hall No 2							
Henty Dam			North West	Henty River	350	280	41°52′48″S 145°32′24″E
		Knights Creek Reservoir					
Lake Echo Dam			Central Highlands	Dee River	725,490	588,160	42°15′00″S 146°36′36″E
Laughing Jack Dam		Laughing Jack Lagoon					42°10′35.8″S 146°19′51.7″E
Liapootah Dam		Lake Liapootah	Central Highlands	Nive River	1,880	1,520	42°18′36″S 146°28′12″E
		Limekiln Gully Reservoir					
		Lower Reservoir					
Mackintosh Dam		Lake Mackintosh	Western	Mackintosh River	913,690	740,740	41°41′24″S 145°38′24″E
Margaret Dam		Lake Margaret	West Coast	Yolande River	15,374	12,464	41°59′24″S 145°34′12″E
Meadowbank Dam			Central Highlands	River Derwent	59,650	48,360	42°36′36″S 146°50′24″E
Meander Dam		Huntsman Lake	Northern	Meander River	36,000	29,000	41°41′24″S 146°37′12″E
Monarch Dam			North East	Shallamar Creek			
Mount Paris Dam			North East				41°13′08.4″S 147°51′14.2″E
Murchison Dam		Lake Murchison	Western	Murchison River	96,910	78,570	41°46′48″S 145°38′24″E
Newton Dam			Western	Newton Creek	6,330	5,130	41°54′36″S 145°33′00″E
Paloona Dam		Lake Paloona	Northern	Forth River	19,110	15,490	41°16′48″S 146°14′24″E
		Lake Parangana					
Pet River Scheme							
Pine Tier Dam		Pine Tier Lagoon	Central Highlands	Nive River	7,420	6,020	42°06′00″S 146°28′48″E
Reece Dam		Lake Pieman	West Coast	Pieman River	300,200	243,400	41°43′12″S 145°07′48″E
Repulse Dam			Central Highlands	River Derwent	6,330	5,130	42°30′00″S 146°38′24″E
		Ridgeway Reservoir					
		Rileys Creek Reservoir					
Risdon Brook Dam							
Rowallan Dam		Lake Rowallan	Northern	Mersey River	130,490	105,790	41°43′48″S 146°12′36″E
		Lake Samuel					
Scotts Peak Dam		Lake Pedder	South West	Huon River	2,937,930	2,381,820	43°01′48″S 146°17′24″E
Serpentine Dam		Lake Pedder	South West	Serpentine River	2,937,930	2,381,820	42°46′12″S 145°58′48″E
Stanton Dam							
Taylor No 3							
		Tolosa Park Reservoir					
Tullabardine Dam		Lake Mackintosh					
Trevallyn Dam		Lake Trevallyn	Northern	South Esk River	12,330	10,000	41°26′24″S 147°04′48″E
Upper Grassy Dam							
		Upper Reservoir					
Wayatinah Dam		Wayatinah Lagoon	Central Highlands	River Derwent	8,860	7,180	42°24′00″S 146°29′24″E
White Spur Dam		White Spur Lake	North West	White Spur Creek	1,750	1,420	41°53′24″S 145°31′48″E
Wilmot Dam		Lake Gairdner	Northern	Wilmont River	8,820	7,150	41°28′12″S 146°04′12″E

== Victoria ==
=== Melbourne Water area ===
- Anakie Gorge
- Cardinia Reservoir
- Devilbend Reservoir
- Greenvale Reservoir
- Melton reservoir
- Maroondah Reservoir
- O'Shannassy Reservoir
- Silvan Reservoir
- Sugarloaf Reservoir
- Tarago Reservoir
- Thomson Dam
- Toorourrong Reservoir
- Upper Yarra Reservoir
- Yan Yean Reservoir

=== Regional Victoria ===
- Blue Rock Dam
- Cairn Curran Reservoir
- Dartmouth Dam
- Eildon Dam
- Lake Eppalock
- Glenmaggie Dam
- Goulburn Weir
- Laanecoorie Weir
- Lauriston Reservoir
- Malmsbury Reservoir
- Moondara Reservoir
- Rocklands Reservoir
- Upper Coliban Reservoir
- Waranga Basin
- William Hovell Dam

=== Barwon Water area ===
- Allen Reservoir
- Bostock Reservoir
- Korweinguboora Reservoir
- Marengo Basin
- Painkalac Reservoir
- Stony Creek Reservoirs
- West Barwon Reservoir
- West Gellibrand and Olangolah Reservoirs and No. 4 & No.5 Basins
- Wurdee Boluc Reservoir

== Western Australia ==
=== Metropolitan Supply ===
- Araluen Pumpback Dam
- Bickley Pumpback Dam
- Bold Park Reservoir
- Buckland Hill Reservoir
- Canning Dam
- Churchman Brook Dam
- Conjurinup Creek Dam
- Greenmount Reservoir
- Kangaroo Gully
- Lower South Dandalup Pumpback Dam
- Melville Reservoir
- Mount Eliza Reservoir
- Mount Hawthorn Reservoir
- Mount Tamworth Reservoir
- Mount Yokine Reservoir
- Mirrabooka Reservoir
- Neerabup Reservoir
- North Dandalup Dam
- Richmond Reservoir
- Samson Brook Dam
- Serpentine Dam
- Serpentine Pipehead Dam
- South Dandalup Dam
- Stirling Dam
- Thompsons Lake Reservoir
- Victoria Dam
- Wanneroo Reservoir
- Whitfords Reservoir
- Wungong Dam

=== Goldfields Water Supply ===
- Kalgoorlie Reservoir No1
- Kalgoorlie Reservoir No2
- Kalgoorlie Reservoir No3
- Lower Helena Pumpback Dam
- Mount Charlotte Reservoir
- Mundaring Weir

=== Mid West Region ===
- Allanooka Storage
- Bootenal Storage

=== North West Region ===
- Fitzroy River Barrage
- Harding River Dam
- Lake Argyle
- Lake Kununurra
- Moochalabara Dam
- Seventeen Mile Dam

=== Great Southern Region ===
- Bolganup Dam
- Borden No 1 Dam
- Borden No 2 Dam
- Bottle Creek Dam
- Brookton Dam
- Cranbrook Dam 1
- Cranbrook Dam 2
- Cranbrook Dam 3
- Cuballing Reservoir
- Dumbleyung Dam
- Frankland Dam
- Gnowangerup No 1 Dam
- Gnowangerup No 2 Dam
- Horsley Reservoir
- Hyden Humps Dam
- Jerramungup No 1 Dam
- Jerramungup No 2 Dam
- Karlgarin Reservoir
- Kojonup Dam
- Kondinin/Yeerakine Dam
- Kukerin Reservoir
- Lake Grace No 1 Dam
- Lake King Dam
- Mount Barker Reservoir
- Mount Clarence Reservoir
- Munglinup Dam
- Newdegate Turkey Nest Dam
- Nyabing Dam
- Ongerup No 1 Dam
- Ongerup No 2 Dam
- Ongerup No 3 Dam
- Pingrup Dam
- Pinwernying Dam
- Puntapin Dam
- Ravensthorpe Dam 1
- Ravensthorpe Dam 2
- Ravensthorpe Dam 3
- Ravensthorpe Dam 4
- Rocky Gully
- Tambellup No 1 Dam
- Varley Dam
- Wandering No 1 Dam
- Wandering No 2 Dam
- Wave Rock Dam

=== South West Region ===
- Balingup Dam
- Big Brook Dam
- Boyup Brook Dam
- Drakesbrook Dam
- Dumpling Gully No1 Dam
- Dumpling Gully No2 Dam
- Glen Mervyn Dam
- Harvey Dam
- Harris River Dam
- Hester Dam
- Kirup Dam
- Logue Brook Dam
- Manjimup Dam
- Millstream Dam
- Mungalup Dam
- Nannup Dam
- Phillips Creek Dam
- Quinninup Dam
- Samson Brook Dam
- Stirling Dam
- Ten Mile Brook Dam
- Waroona Dam
- Wellington Dam

== See also ==
- List of dams and reservoirs
- Lakes of Australia
- Lakes and Reservoirs in Melbourne
