= Teviot =

Teviot may refer to:

== People ==
- Baron Teviot
- Earl of Teviot

== Places ==
=== Australia ===
- Teviot, Queensland, a town in the Scenic Rim Region, Queensland
- Teviot Brook, a river in the Scenic Rim Region, Queensland
- Teviot Falls, Queensland
- Teviot Creek Dam, Queensland
- Teviot Range, Mountain range in Queensland, Australia

=== New Zealand ===
- Teviot, New Zealand
- Teviot River, New Zealand

=== United Kingdom ===
- River Teviot, Scotland, and associated Teviotdale and Teviothead placenames
- Teviot Row House, Edinburgh the world's oldest student union building, run by Edinburgh University Students' Association

== Other ==
- SS Teviot, a cargo ship in service with the Royal Mail Line from 1946 to 1960
