= Cyclone Debbie =

Category 4 Australian region cyclone in 2017

Severe Tropical Cyclone Debbie
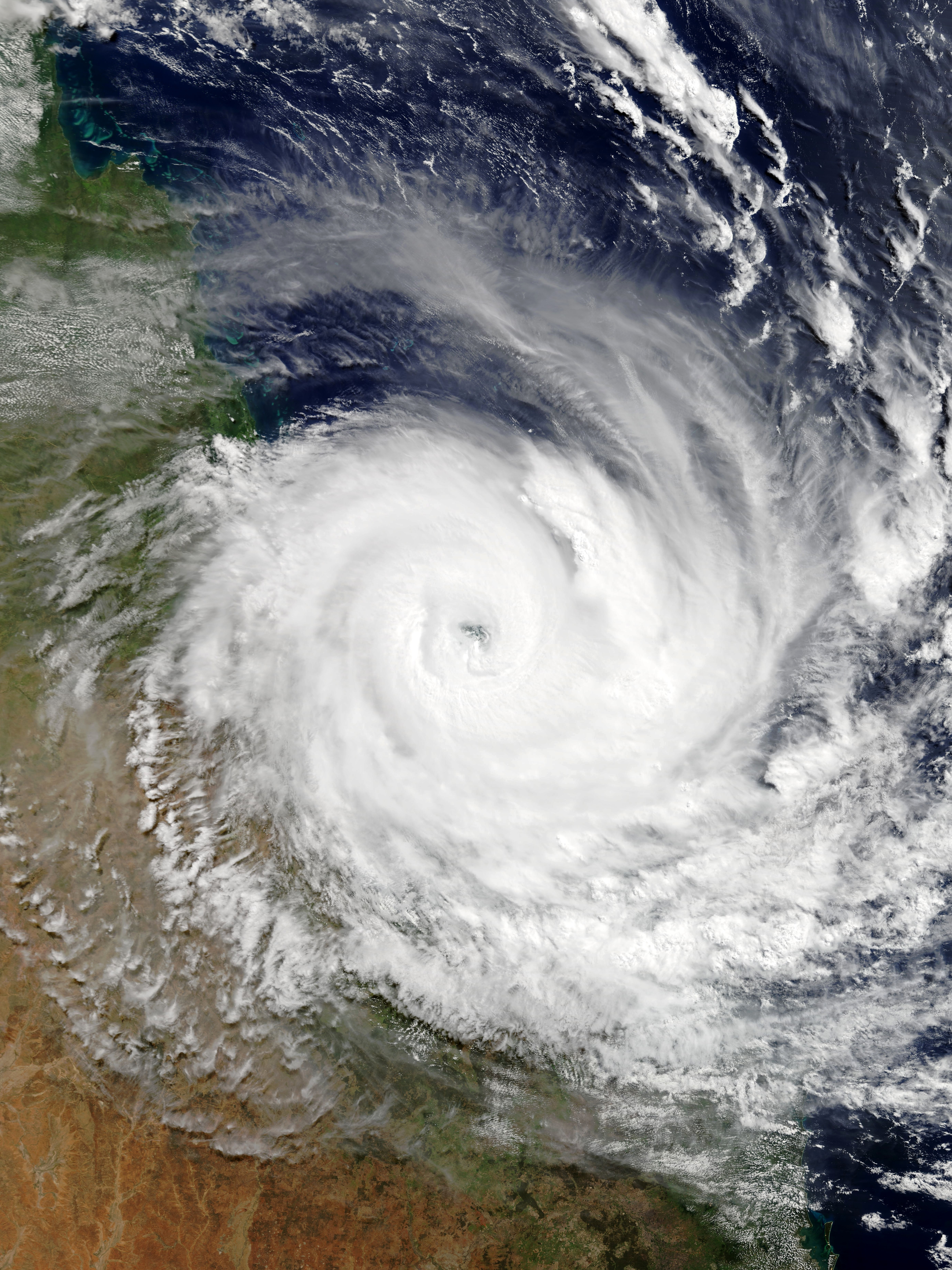
- Cyclone Debbie approaching Queensland shortly after peak intensity on 28 March

Meteorological history
- Formed: 23 March 2017
- Remnant low: 30 March 2017
- Dissipated: 7 April 2017

Category 4 severe tropical cyclone
- 10-minute sustained (Aus)
- Highest winds: 175 km/h (110 mph)
- Lowest pressure: 949 hPa (mbar); 28.02 inHg

Category 4-equivalent tropical cyclone
- 1-minute sustained (SSHWS)
- Highest winds: 215 km/h (130 mph)
- Lowest pressure: 937 hPa (mbar); 27.67 inHg

Overall effects
- Fatalities: 14 total
- Damage: A$3.5 billion (Second-costliest tropical cyclone in the Australian region basin)
- Areas affected: Queensland, New South Wales, New Zealand
- IBTrACS
- Part of the 2016–17 Australian region cyclone season

Severe Tropical Cyclone Debbie in 2017 was the strongest tropical cyclone to strike Queensland since Marcia in 2015, and was the costliest tropical cyclone in Australia since Yasi in 2011. Forming as a tropical low on 23 March, the low gradually intensified into a named tropical cyclone on 25 March. After steadily strengthening offshore to a Category 4 system, Debbie eventually made landfall near Airlie Beach, at 12:40 AEST on 28 March. Afterwards, Debbie rapidly weakened into a tropical low by late 28 March, but continued to travel south, causing significant damage and flooding in the populous areas of South East Queensland and Northern Rivers. In total, the storm caused A$3.5 billion (US$2.67 billion) in damage and fourteen deaths across Australia, primarily as a result of extreme flooding. This makes Debbie the deadliest cyclone to hit Australia since Fifi in 1991.

== Meteorological history ==
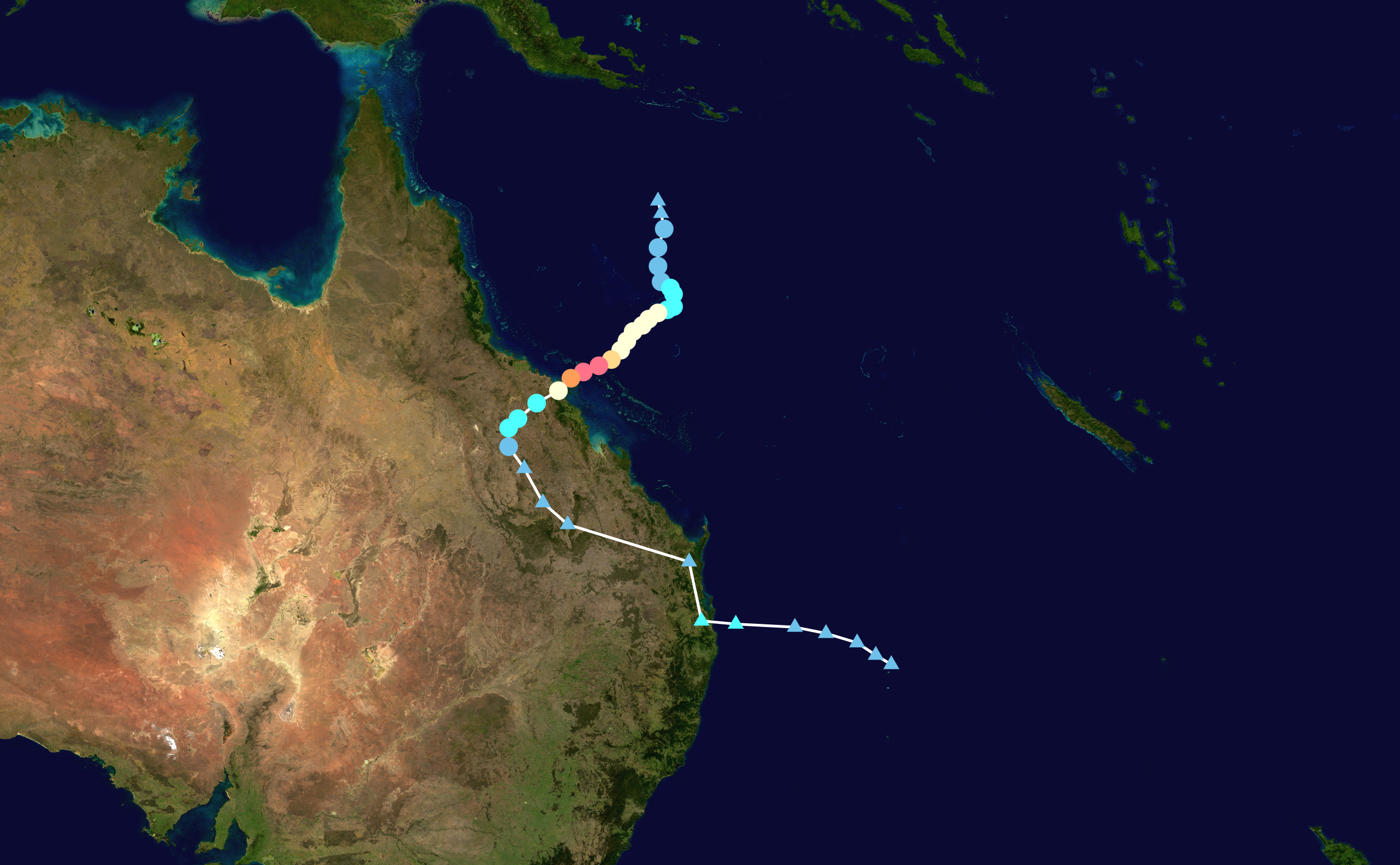
Map plotting the storm's track and intensity, according to the Saffir–Simpson scale Map key Saffir–Simpson scale Tropical depression (≤38 mph, ≤62 km/h) Tropical storm (39–73 mph, 63–118 km/h) Category 1 (74–95 mph, 119–153 km/h) Category 2 (96–110 mph, 154–177 km/h) Category 3 (111–129 mph, 178–208 km/h) Category 4 (130–156 mph, 209–251 km/h) Category 5 (≥157 mph, ≥252 km/h) Unknown Storm type Tropical cyclone Subtropical cyclone Extratropical cyclone, remnant low, tropical disturbance, or monsoon depression

On 22 March 2017, a well-defined but weak area of low pressure developed over the Coral Sea, near the Louisiade Archipelago of Papua New Guinea. Strong wind shear aloft kept the accompanying convection poorly organised and displaced west of the surface circulation. With environmental conditions forecast to improve and favour cyclogenesis, the Australian Bureau of Meteorology's (BOM) Tropical Cyclone Warning Centre in Brisbane classified the system as a tropical low on 23 March. Throughout the following day, decreasing shear enabled convection to wrap around the low; however, convective activity remained largely transient. A mid-level ridge to the east and an approaching trough over the Tasman Sea steered the low generally south. High sea surface temperatures of 29–30 °C (84–86 °F) and excellent dual-channel outflow fuelled rapid consolidation on 24 March. This prompted the United States-based Joint Typhoon Warning Center (JTWC) to issue a Tropical Cyclone Formation Alert, indicating the system was likely to acquire gale-force winds within 24 hours.

A scatterometer pass at 11:56 UTC revealed surface winds of up to 75 km/h (47 mph) and subsequent satellite intensity estimates supported gale-intensity, and the JTWC accordingly classified the system as Tropical Cyclone 13P by 21:00 UTC. With exceptionally favourable environmental conditions ahead of the storm, the agency noted a high probability for rapid deepening before landfall in Queensland. The BOM followed suit soon thereafter, classifying the system as a Category 1 tropical cyclone on the Australian cyclone intensity scale at 00:00 UTC on 25 March. Concurrently, they assigned it the name Debbie.

The cyclone continued to track generally southwards, developing into a Category 2 cyclone later that day. After attaining that strength, Debbie assumed a generally southwestwards track—a track it would maintain, with minor fluctuations, until about 14 hours after landfall. After a day-long period of arrested development, environmental conditions became highly favourable for renewed intensification. Beginning early on 27 March, Debbie strengthened rapidly from Category 2 to a Category 4 severe tropical cyclone in just 12 hours, and achieving peak sustained winds of 175 km/h (109 mph) and a minimum pressure of 949 hPa (28.02 inHg). After that, the Dvorak intensity given that the storm weakened slightly. Debbie passed over the Whitsunday Islands in the morning of 28 March local time with winds of 165 km/h (103 mph), still at Category 4 intensity. Nonetheless, the cyclone weakened to Category 3 before making landfall in Airlie Beach at 02:40 UTC with winds of 150 km/h (93 mph).

Following landfall, Debbie began to weaken steadily while interacting with North Queensland's rugged terrain. The cyclone weakened below severe tropical cyclone status while passing Collinsville at 12:00 UTC on 28 March. The system was downgraded to Category 1 in the early hours of 29 March local time, and then weakened further to a tropical low six few hours afterwards. The tropical low then executed a long turn to the southeast, and proceeded towards South East Queensland, moving roughly parallel to the coast. The remnants of Debbie brought heavy rainfall—torrential rains in many areas—that resulted in flooding in large parts of the land areas across which it tracked, before moving out over the Pacific Ocean on Friday 31 March.

== Preparations ==
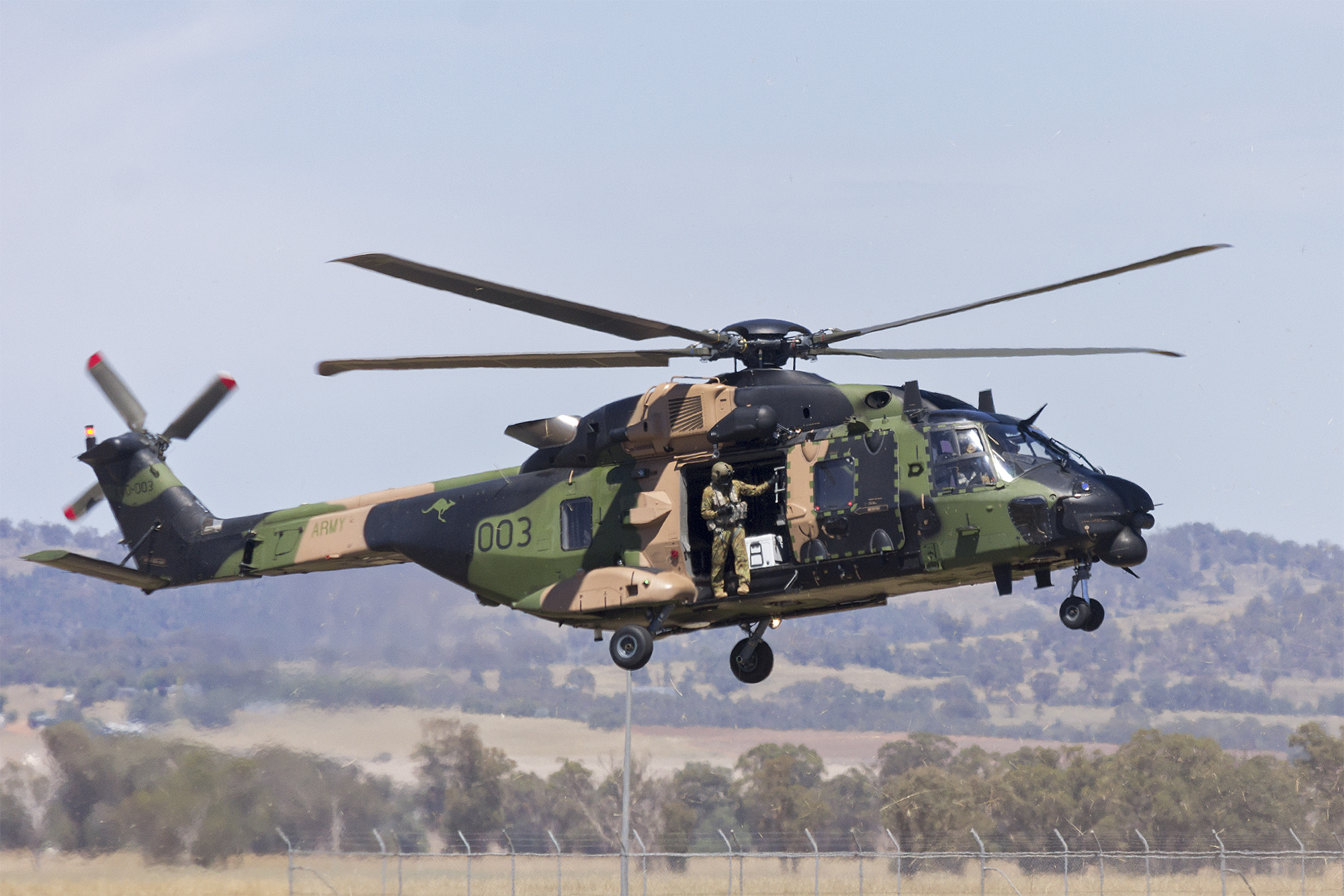
An MRH-90 helicopter in 2015, similar to those deployed from HMAS Albatross to aid in Operation Queensland Assist

Major storm surge was seen as one of the most dangerous factors associated with the approaching cyclone. With the storm potentially coinciding with high tide, it was estimated that water rise in some areas could potentially exceed 7 m (23 ft). Residents in low-lying areas across Bowen, Proserpine and Airlie Beach were ordered to evacuate their homes. Late on 27 March, just over 12 hours prior to landfall, 25,000 residents in low-lying areas of Mackay were ordered to evacuate. Approximately 5,500 people in the Bowen area were also urged to leave. Across Queensland, more than 400 schools and education centres were closed. All flights at Townsville Airport, Proserpine/Whitsunday Coast Airport, Mackay Airport, Hamilton Island Airport and Moranbah Airport were cancelled from 27 March, and Queensland Rail suspended train services between Rockhampton and Townsville. North Queensland Bulk Ports closed the ports at Mackay, Abbot Point and Hay Point. A total of 1,000 emergency personnel and more than 200 Energex workers were deployed to the region to assist with Ergon Energy's preparations and clean up operations.

The Australian Defence Force formed Joint Task Force 661, dubbed "Operation Queensland Assist", to provide assistance with aeromedical evacuation, search and rescue, road clearance, restoration of essential services, emergency accommodation and the delivery of stores if required. The Royal Australian Navy landing ship HMAS Choules set sail from Sydney to Queensland to support post-storm recovery. Normally, HMAS Canberra and HMAS Adelaide would be deployed; however, propulsion issues with the two vessels kept them docked for repairs. Three MRH-90 helicopters from HMAS Albatross were also deployed to Queensland. The Royal Australian Air Force put transport aircraft on standby at Townsville, RAAF Base Amberley and RAAF Base Darwin. The Australian Defence Force's pre-deployment of resources was the largest in the nation's history in advance of a natural disaster; approximately 1,200 personnel were deployed.

=== Media criticism ===
There was criticism of the intense coverage of the cyclone by commercial TV media, including some unsafe actions by reporters. Former Deputy Leader of Australian Greens, Adam Bandt, was criticised by the conservative government's Federal Energy Minister for suggesting that construction of new coal plants would cause climate change, and hence increase the intensity of extreme weather events like Cyclone Debbie.

== Impact ==
=== Queensland ===
Costliest Australian region tropical cyclones
Rank	Tropical cyclones	Season	Damage
1	4 Yasi	2010–11	$3.6 billion
2	4 Debbie	2016–17	$2.73 billion
3	TS Oswald	2012–13	$2.52 billion
4	4 Alfred	2024–25	$1.36 billion
5	4 Veronica	2018–19	$1.2 billion
6	5 Ita	2013–14	$1.15 billion
7	4 Larry	2005–06	$1.1 billion
8	4 Zelia	2024–25	$733 million
9	4 Jasper	2023–24	$670 million
10	3 Tracy	1974–75	$645 million

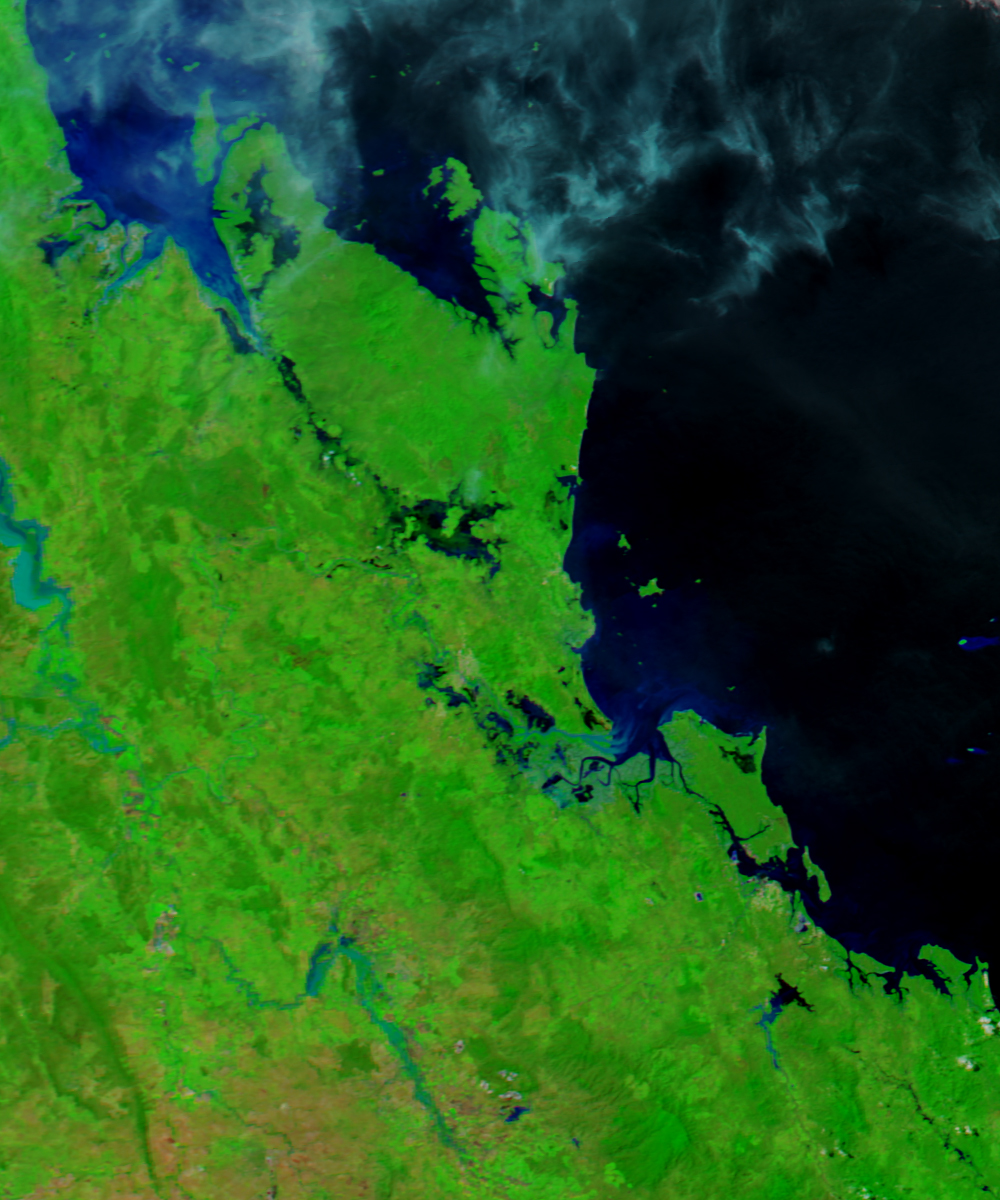
Queensland after Debbie on 31 March

An unexpected turn to the south during the cyclone's final approach to the Queensland coast brought the storm directly on top of Hamilton Island, where no evacuations took place. Damage was reported on the Whitsunday Islands, as strong winds lifted some roofs from houses; on Hamilton Island, sustained winds reached 191 km/h (119 mph) with gusts up to 263 km/h (163 mph) around 10:28 a.m. local time on 28 March. Winds in excess of 100 km/h (62 mph) battered the island for more than 24 hours. Power outages affected at least 63,000 properties across Queensland, and numerous trees were uprooted during the storm, with some crashing onto homes. Many animals would have been left to die. Major damage was reported across Bowen, where most homes had been built before stricter building codes were enforced. Approximately 300 people, primarily tourists, on Daydream Island were left stranded and in dire need of supplies. Attempts were made to evacuate residents from the island; however, ships were unable to dock as the jetty was destroyed.

A flock of cockatoos was caught in the storm near Airlie Beach, and many died while clinging to tree branches. One particular bird, later nicknamed Debbie, was found stripped of its feathers by Townsville Bulletin photographer Alix Sweeney and rescued as the cyclone's eye passed through. The story of Debbie became a viral headline. Although seemingly in good spirits once the storm cleared, the bird died during the overnight of 29–30 March likely due to internal injuries.

Inclement weather and evacuations associated with the cyclone were blamed for a fatal car accident near Proserpine on 27 March, where one person died on-scene whilst two others were hospitalised. A man in Proserpine also suffered an injury and was hospitalised after a wall collapsed on him on 28 March.

Torrential rains—described by the Bureau of Meteorology as "phenomenal"—affected large portions of Queensland, particularly in the Pioneer Basin. Forty-eight-hour accumulations in the area exceeded 1,000 mm (39 in)—these areas see an average of 1,500 to 2,000 mm (59 to 79 in) of rain per year. West of Mackay, the Kinchant and Middle Creek dams overflowed, prompting additional evacuation of residents. Multiple sections of the Bruce Highway between Townsville and Mackay were submerged by floodwaters, prompting its closure. The ex-tropical cyclone went on to cause damage further south, particularly around the Logan and Albert Rivers, flooding infrastructure such as the Beenleigh railway station and resulting in the death of a 77-year-old man in Eagleby.

Damage to Queensland's sugar industry is expected to cost A$150 million (US$114.5 million). The majority of these costs lie in Proserpine and Mackay. 35% of all sugarcane in the Proserpine region and 20% of all sugarcane in the Mackay region were damaged, costing A$50 million (US$38.2 million) and A$81 million (US$61.8 million) respectively. Damage to winter crops in the Bowen–Gumlu region reached A$100 million (US$76.4 million). Insured losses across Australia reached A$1.65 billion (US$1.26 billion), with 73,000 damage claims being filed. Total economic losses reached A$3.5 billion (US$2.67 billion). In addition, a total of eight deaths were reported throughout Queensland.

=== New South Wales ===
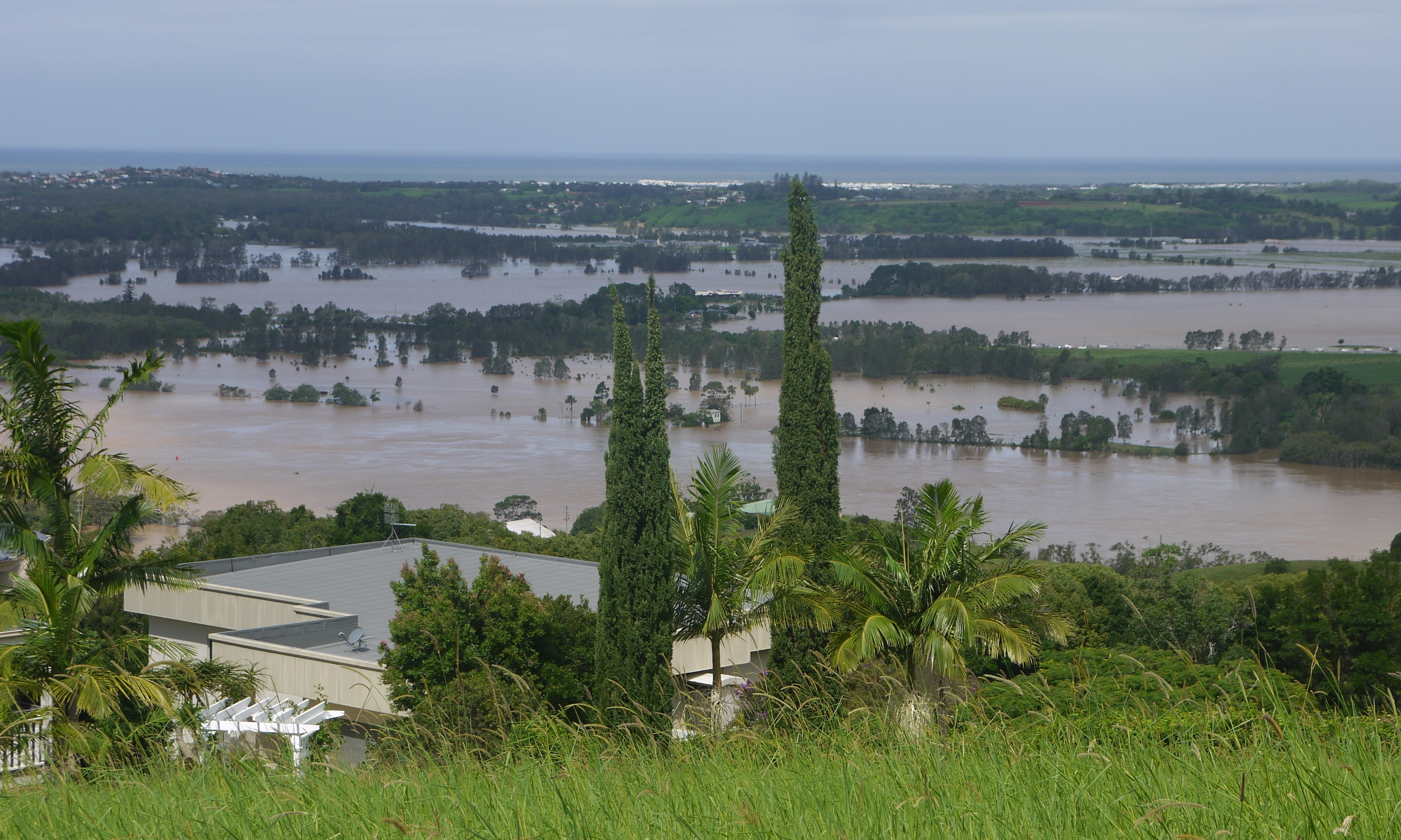
Flooding on the Tweed River as seen from Terranora on 1 April

Ex-Tropical Cyclone Debbie continued to move south and merged with a cold front moving up the north coast of New South Wales. This triggered heavy rainfall in the Northern Rivers and led to significant flooding in the Tweed, Lismore, Byron, Richmond Valley, Kyogle and Ballina local government areas. A woman drowned in floodwaters at a rural property south of Murwillumbah, while the Pacific Motorway was cut off by floodwaters at Chinderah. New South Wales Premier Gladys Berejiklian declared the regions as disaster zones, thus enabling the residents to access disaster assistance funding. Two more people were confirmed to have drowned in floodwaters on 1 April, another south of Murwillumbah and one at Gungal.

On 3 April, a mother and two of her children drowned when their car plunged into the flooded Tweed River at Tumbulgum. In total, Debbie killed six people in New South Wales.

=== New Zealand ===
A week after becoming extratropical, the remnants of Cyclone Debbie passed over New Zealand, causing flash flooding over many areas. The township of Edgecumbe in the Bay of Plenty region was evacuated on April 6 due to flooding, and a state of emergency was declared. The insurance claims reached NZ$91.5 million (US$63.8 million).

== Aftermath ==
Queensland Premier Annastacia Palaszczuk pledged A$1,000,000 (US$754,205) to assist the Australian Red Cross Society, Salvation Army, St. Vincent de Paul Society of Queensland, and UnitingCare Community in distributing supplies.

Debbie was the only name from the 2016–2017 season to be retired by the Bureau of Meteorology. It was replaced by Dara in mid-2018.

== See also ==
- Weather of 2016 and 2017
- Tropical cyclones in 2016 and 2017
- Cyclone Larry
- Cyclone Ului
- Cyclone Ita
- Cyclone Marcia
- Cyclone Yasi
