= Toonumbar Dam =

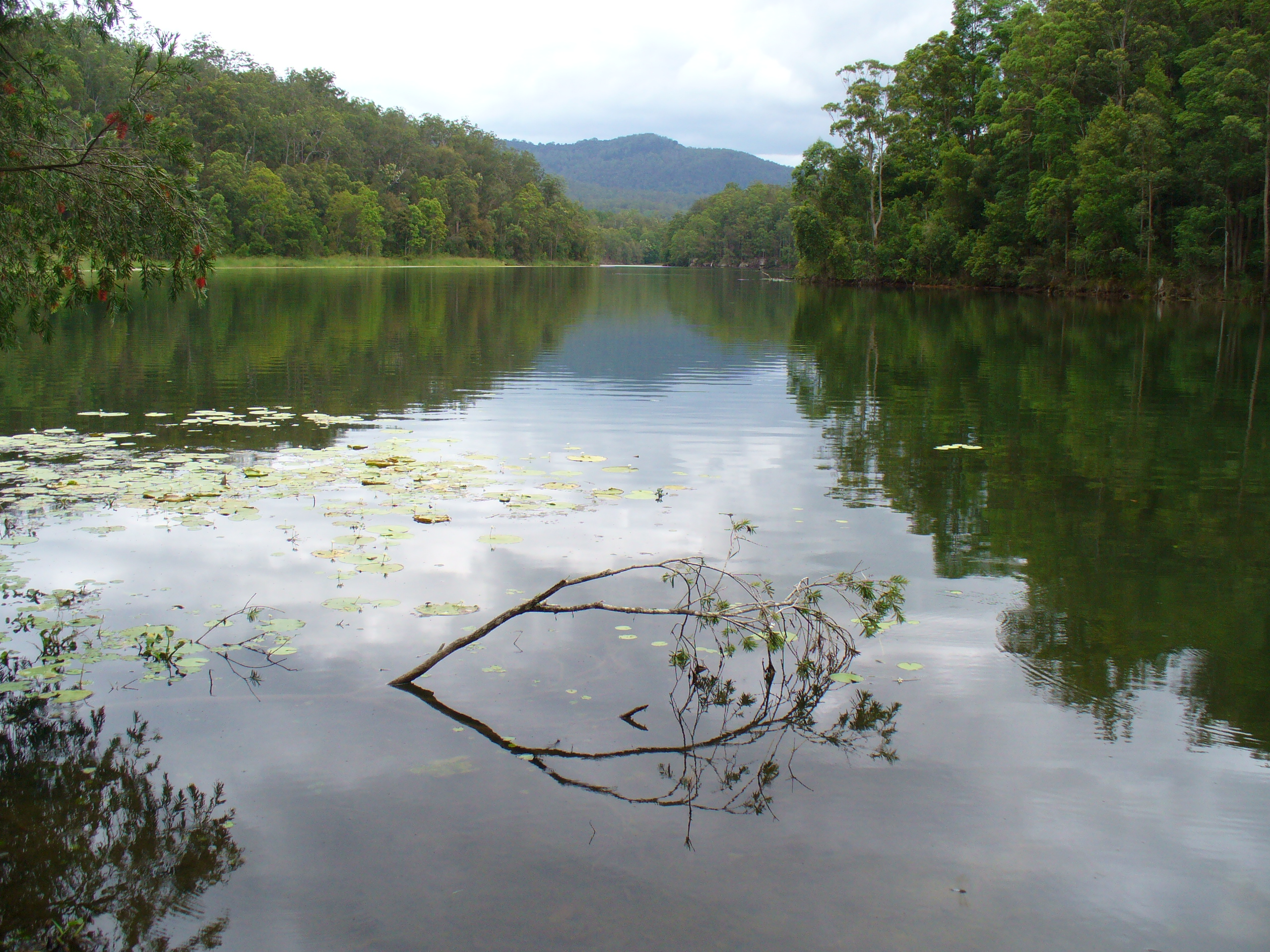
- Toonumbar Dam viewed from Bells Bay Camping Area

- Location of the Toonumbar Dam in New South Wales
- Country: Australia
- Location: Northern Rivers, New South Wales
- Coordinates: 28°37′16″S 152°47′29″E
- Purpose: Hydro-power, irrigation, water supply and conservation
- Status: Operational
- Construction began: 1969
- Opening date: 1971
- Owner: State Water Corporation

Dam and spillways
- Type of dam: Embankment dam
- Impounds: Iron Pot Creek
- Height: 44 metres (144 ft)
- Length: 229 metres (751 ft)
- Dam volume: 361 cubic metres (12,700 cu ft)
- Spillways: 1
- Spillway type: Concrete chute
- Spillway capacity: 1,700 cubic metres per second (60,000 cu ft/s)

Reservoir
- Creates: Lake Toonumbar
- Total capacity: 1,100 megalitres (39×10^{6} cu ft)
- Catchment area: 98 square kilometres (38 sq mi)
- Surface area: 320 hectares (790 acres)
- Maximum water depth: 34 metres (112 ft)
- Normal elevation: 129.6 metres (425 ft) AHD

Power Station
- Type: Conventional
- Installed capacity: 0.1 megawatts (130 hp)
- Website; Toonumbar Dam at www.statewater.com.au

Toonumbar Dam is a minor ungated rock fill with clay core embankment dam with a concrete chute spillway across the Iron Pot Creek north-west of Casino in the Northern Rivers region of New South Wales, Australia. The dam's purpose includes hydro-power, irrigation, water supply, and conservation. The impounded reservoir is called Lake Toonumbar.

== Location and features ==
Commenced in 1969 and completed in 1971, the Toonumbar Dam is a minor ungated dam, located approximately 30 kilometres (19 mi) west of Kyogle and 55 kilometres (34 mi) north-west of Casino. The dam was built by Citra Australia Limited on behalf of the New South Wales Department of Land and Water Conservation to conserve water, control flows, reduce flood risk and provide a reliable water supply in the region.

The dam wall constructed with 361 cubic metres (12,700 cu ft) of rock fill with clay core is 44 metres (144 ft) high and 483 metres (1,585 ft) long. The maximum water depth is 34 metres (112 ft) and at 100% capacity the dam wall holds back 11,100 megalitres (390×10^{6} cu ft) of water at 129.6 metres (425 ft) AHD. The surface area of Lake Toonumbar is 320 hectares (790 acres) and the catchment area is 9,800 square kilometres (3,800 sq mi). The uncontrolled concrete chute spillway is capable of discharging 1,700 cubic metres per second (60,000 cu ft/s).

== Recreation ==
The reservoir, Lake Toonumbar, provides a location for freshwater sports fishing for the species Australian Bass. Boat access is available at Bells Bay and near the dam wall, combustion engine powered craft are permitted to use the dam as long as the 8 knot speed limit is kept to.

=== Fishing ===
Lake Toonumbar has been stocked regularly with Australian Bass and Eastern Cod (totally protected in NSW) fingerlings. It is also known as one of the best bass fisheries on the North Coast. A NSW Fishing Licence is required to fish in the dam.

== See also ==
- List of reservoirs and dams in Australia
