= Wild River Dam =

Dam in Far North Queensland, Australia

- Location of the dam in Queensland
- Interactive map of Wild River Dam
- Country: Australia
- Location: Herberton, Far North Queensland
- Coordinates: 17°21′58″S 145°25′55″E
- Status: Operational
- Opening date: 1994

Dam and spillways
- Type of dam: Earth fill dam
- Impounds: Wild River
- Height (foundation): 16 m (52 ft)
- Length: 230 m (750 ft)
- Dam volume: 43×10^{3} m^{3} (1.5×10^{6} cu ft)
- Spillway type: Uncontrolled
- Spillway capacity: 270 m^{3}/s (9,500 cu ft/s)

Reservoir
- Creates: Wild River Dam Reservoir
- Total capacity: 280 ML (230 acre⋅ft)
- Catchment area: 8 ha (20 acres)
- Surface area: 50 km^{2} (19 sq mi)

The Wild River Dam, also known as the Herberton Dam, is an earth-filled embankment dam across the Wild River, located approximately 5 kilometres (3 mi) northeast of Herberton, in Far North Queensland, Australia.

== Overview ==
Situated on Moomin Road and completed in 1994, the dam is 16 metres (52 ft) high and 230 metres (750 ft) long. The resultant 280-megalitre (230 acre⋅ft) reservoir draws from a relatively small catchment area of 8 square kilometres (3.1 sq mi).

== See also ==
- List of dams and reservoirs in Australia
