= Murgon Weir =

Weir in Queensland, Australia

- Location of the weir in Queensland
- Interactive map of Murgon Weir
- Country: Australia
- Location: Murgon, Wide Bay-Burnett, Queensland
- Coordinates: 26°39′01″S 151°55′28″E
- Purpose: Irrigation
- Status: Operational
- Owner: Queensland Department of Natural Resources
- Operator: Sunwater

Dam and spillways
- Type of dam: Barrage
- Impounds: Barambah Creek

Reservoir
- Total capacity: 500 ML (410 acre⋅ft)

The Murgon Weir is a timber crib weir across the Barambah Creek, located near Murgon, in the Wide Bay-Burnett region of Queensland, Australia. The weir was constructed initially for irrigation purposes for use by nearby farms. The weir, part of the Barker Barambah Water Supply Scheme, is the first artificial walled dam below the Bjelke-Petersen Dam and the resultant reservoir contains approximately 500 megalitres (410 acre⋅ft) when full.

The weir also provides untreated raw water for the small settlement of Murgon.

== Recreation ==
The weir is widely unknown to the public because of its unsigned location and small access tracks. Though when found, the weir has opportunities for canoeing, swimming, bushwalking and other water sports.

=== Kingaroy-Kilkivan Rail Trail ===
The former bridge crossing of the Kingaroy Branch Railway is located 170 metres (560 ft) from the weir wall. The bridge was removed in early 2015, shortly after the demolition and removal of the railway track. The South Burnett Regional Council worked with Gympie Regional Council to plan and construct the Kingaroy-Kilkivan Rail trail between Kingaroy to Kilkivan via the rail corridor through Murgon. The trail was due to be completed in 2016.

== See also ==
- List of dams and reservoirs in Queensland
