= Corella Dam =

Dam in Queensland, Australia

Lake Corella
- Location of the lake in Queensland
- Interactive map of Lake Corella
- Country: Australia
- Location: West of Cloncurry, North-West Queensland
- Coordinates: 20°50′23″S 140°02′42″E
- Purpose: Potable water supply
- Status: Operational
- Construction began: 1956
- Opening date: 1957

Dam and spillways
- Type of dam: Rock-fill dam
- Impounds: Corella River
- Spillway type: Uncontrolled

Reservoir
- Total capacity: 10,500 ML (370×10^{6} cu ft)
- Catchment area: 333 km^{2} (129 sq mi)
- Surface area: 200 ha (490 acres)

Lake Corella is a concrete-faced (gunite) rockfill embankment dam built across the Corella River in north-western Queensland, Australia. Completed between 1956 and 1957, the resultant reservoir provides potable water for the Mary Kathleen Uranium Mine. The dam is located immediately south of the Barkly Highway, about 50 kilometres (31 mi) west of Cloncurry.

== Overview ==
The dam originally had a gated control structure, which was removed in 2004, lowering the spillway and reducing the full supply level. When full, the reservoir has a surface area of 200 hectares (490 acres) and holds 10,500 megalitres (370×10^{6} cu ft) of water.

Clem Walton Park is a popular camping area on the shore of the lake.

== See also ==
- List of dams and reservoirs in Australia
