= Return Creek Dam =

Dam in Queensland, Australia

- Location of the dam in Queensland
- Interactive map of Return Creek Dam
- Country: Australia
- Location: Far North Queensland
- Coordinates: 17°35′48″S 145°08′13″E
- Purpose: Industry (mining)
- Status: Decommissioned
- Opening date: c. 1900s
- Demolition date: 1967

Dam and spillways
- Type of dam: Timber barrage
- Impounds: Return (Nanyeta) Creek

Reservoir
- Total capacity: 6,790 ML (5,500 acre⋅ft)

The Return Creek Dam (locally referred to as the Top Dam) was a timber barrage across the Return (Nanyeta) (Note: Nanyeta is the Indigenous name for the creek, which means Return.) Creek, a tributary of the Herbert River, located approximately 9 kilometres (5.6 mi) northeast of Mount Garnet and approximately 46 kilometres (29 mi) west of Ravenshoe, in Far North Queensland, Australia. The dam was constructed for mining purposes in the c. 1900s and decommissioned in 1967.

== Overview ==
The Return Creek Dam was built in the early 1900s on the Return Creek, to supply the township of Mount Garnet and the copper and silver mine of a water supply. This dam was a large construction of logs and was still in use until, in 1967, when a large flood decimated it causing an evacuation of lower lying areas of the township. The dam was too far damaged to repair so the logs were cleared to allow Return Creek to flow freely. A new water supply for Mount Garnet was sourced elsewhere.

The Tableland Tin Dredging Company constructed the Eastine Creek Dam, across Eastine Creek, in the 1930s to supply mine houses with potable water, as well as for processing mined tin. This area is called Tabo and is just over one kilometre (zero point six two miles) from Mount Garnet. The Eastine Creek Dam continues to supply Tabo with water. Eastine Creek is a tributary of Return Creek; which in turn is a tributary of the Herbert River.

== See also ==
- List of dams and reservoirs in Australia
