= McCauley Weir =

Weir in Queensland, Australia

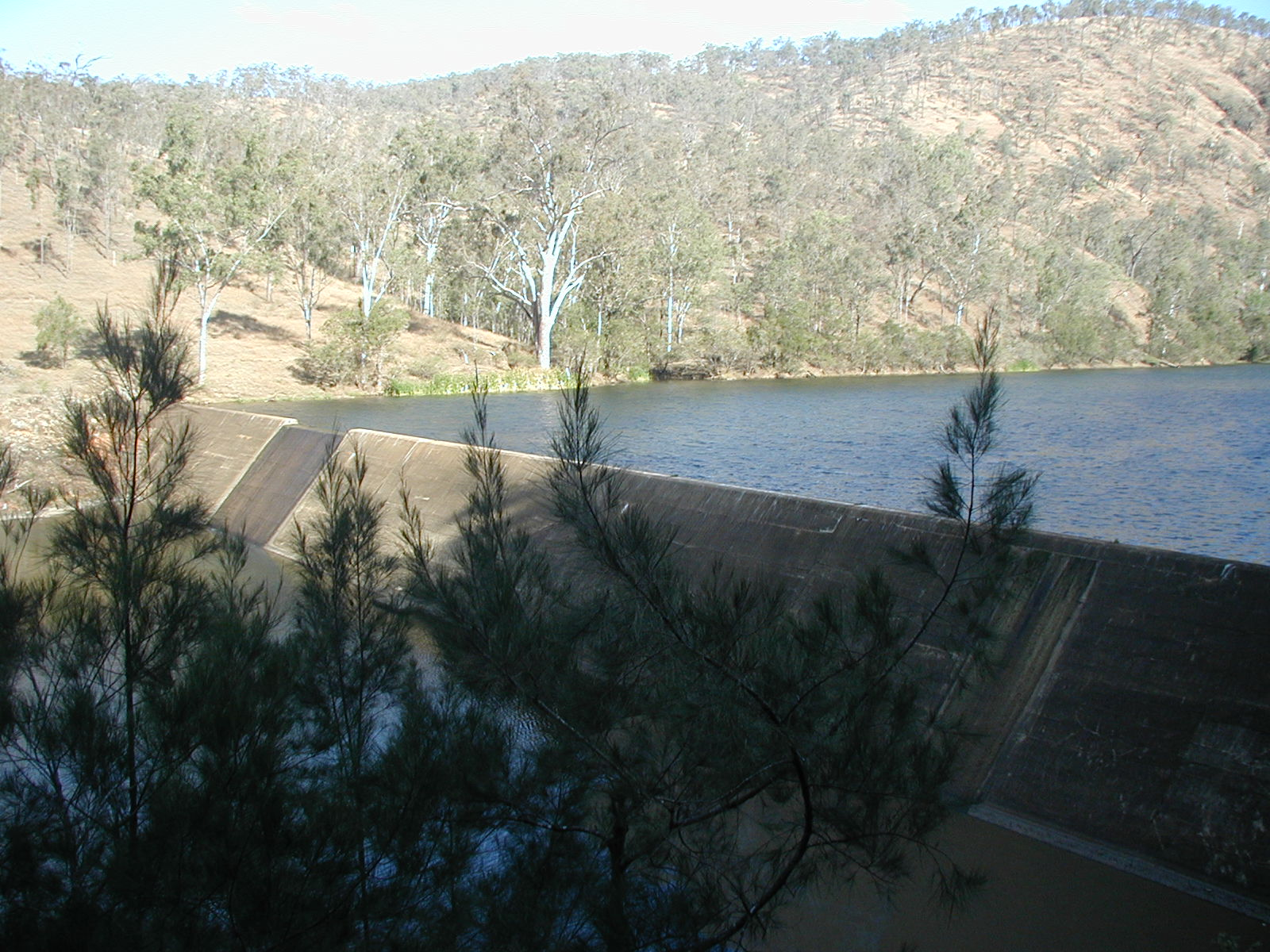
- The weir in September 2001

- Location of the weir in Queensland
- Interactive map of McCauley Weir
- Country: Australia
- Location: Nanango, Wide Bay-Burnett, Queensland
- Coordinates: 26°45′15″S 152°04′47″E
- Purpose: Irrigation
- Status: Operational
- Opening date: 1953

Dam and spillways
- Type of dam: Barrage
- Impounds: Cooyar Creek; Yarraman Creek

Reservoir
- Creates: Lake McCauley
- Total capacity: 320 ML (260 acre⋅ft)

McCauley Weir is a weir across both the Cooyar and Yarraman creeks, located near Nanango, in the Wide Bay-Burnett region of Queensland, Australia. The weir was built in 1953 to supply potable water for Nanango. It has since ceased to be used as a water supply and is only used by nearby farms for stock use. The reservoir has capacity of approximately 320 megalitres (260 acre⋅ft) when full.

== Recreation ==
When open, the weir is a popular spot with canoeists, fishers, bushwalkers and deer hunters. (Note: Hunting is only on private property, with the property owners' permission.) Small motorised craft is permitted, though no high horsepower petrol motors are allowed.

Due to flood damage the road to the weir was closed in 2003. Despite lobbying by local community groups, in 2012 the South Burnett Regional Council voted against reopening the road. Mayor Wayne Kratzmann stated that the road was too dangerous to reopen in its current state, and the Council did not have funds to repair it. In December 2023, it was reported that a six-month trial re-opening of recreation access to the weir would commence in February 2024 and the trial was extended for a further six months in September 2024.

=== Fishing ===
The Cooyar Creek was once home to the Brisbane River Cod, that has been extinct since the 1940s, mainly due to over fishing, poor land practices and mining activities. A recovery project started in 2019 to restore cod to the upper Brisbane River and its tributaries has seen Mary River Cod released within the Brisbane River and the lower Cooyar Creek. However the weir itself is a water barrier to fish migration, and was expected to have a detrimental effect on native fish species and cod recovery efforts on the Cooyar Creek.

== Gallery ==
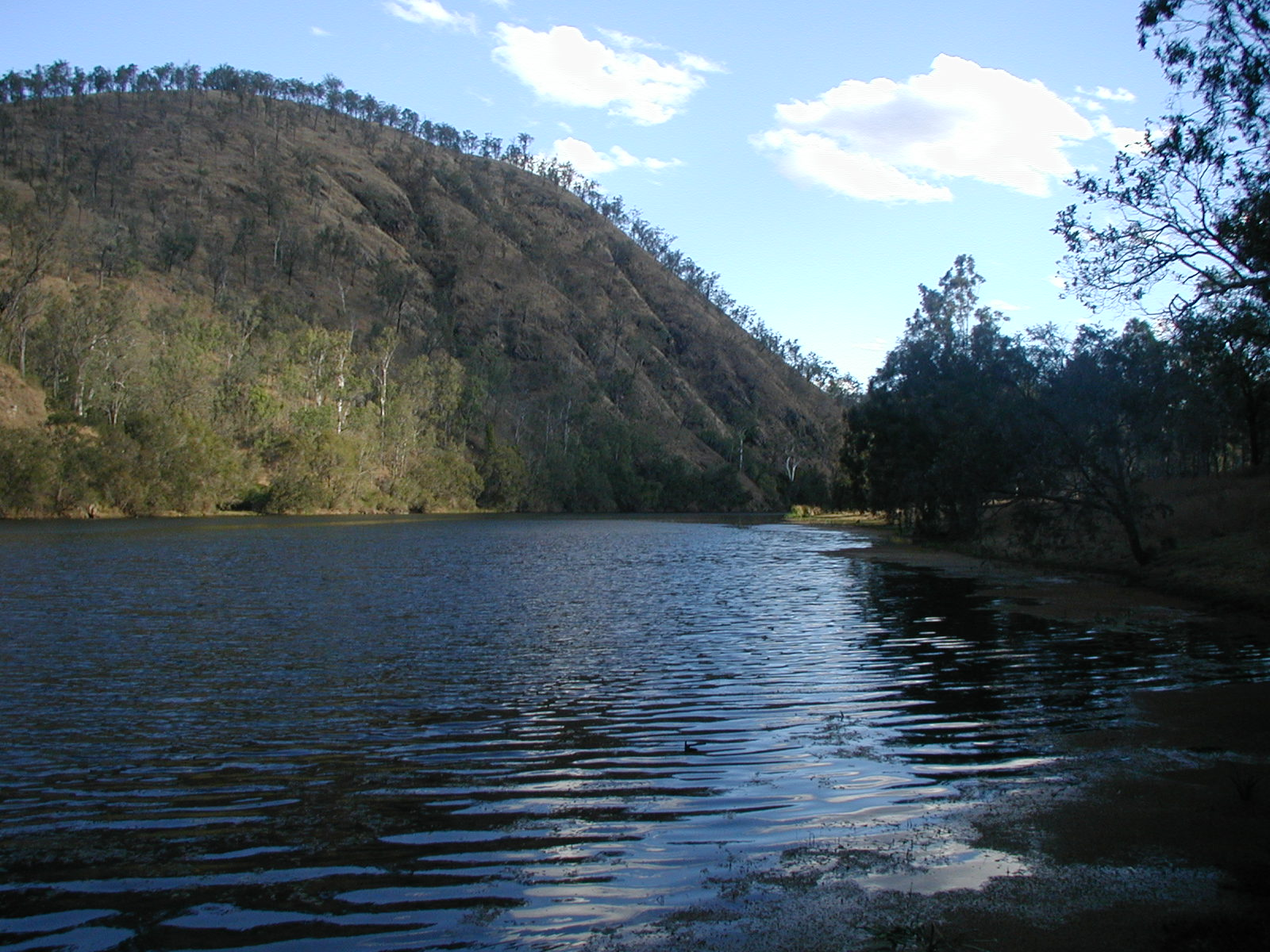

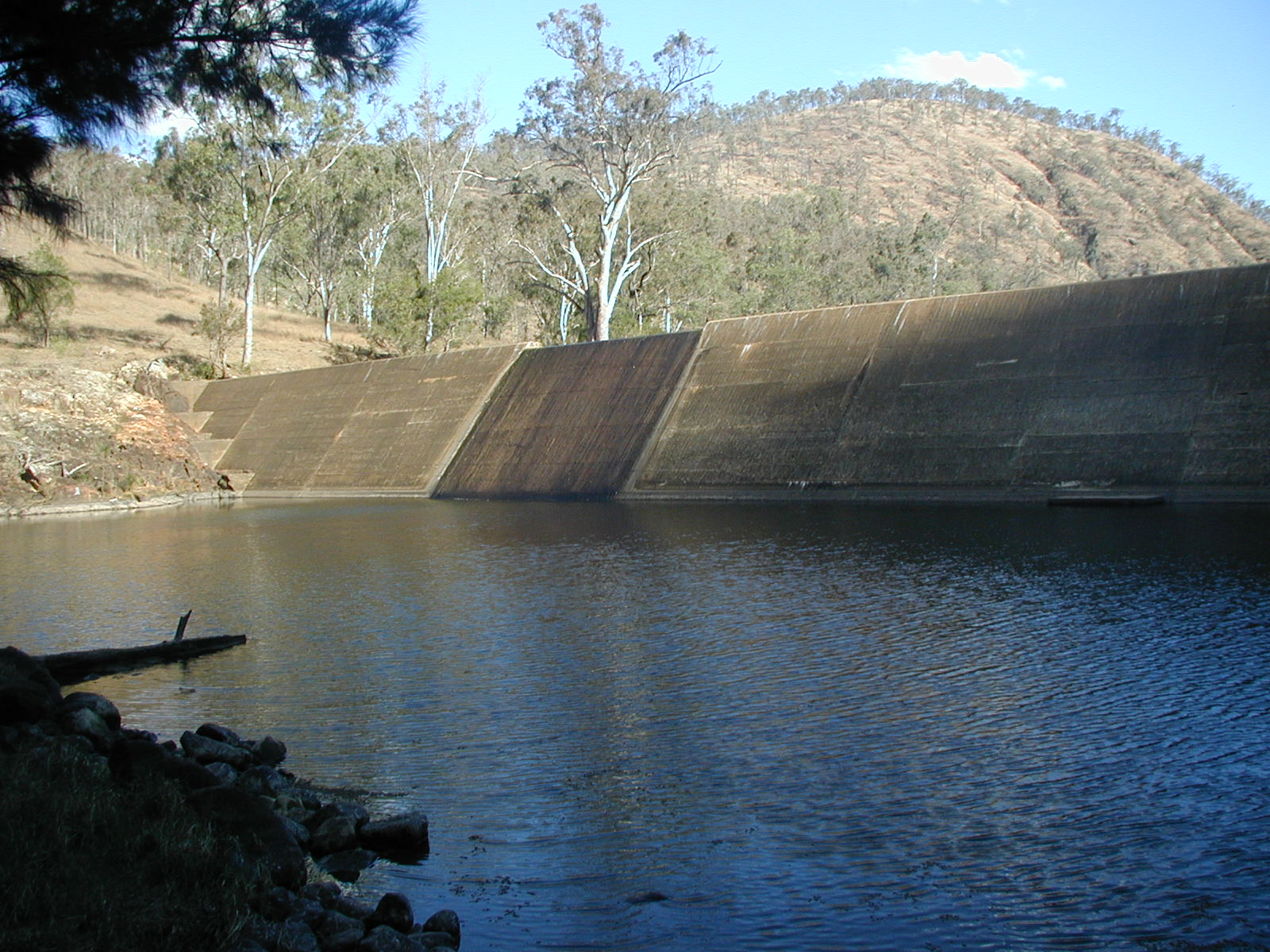

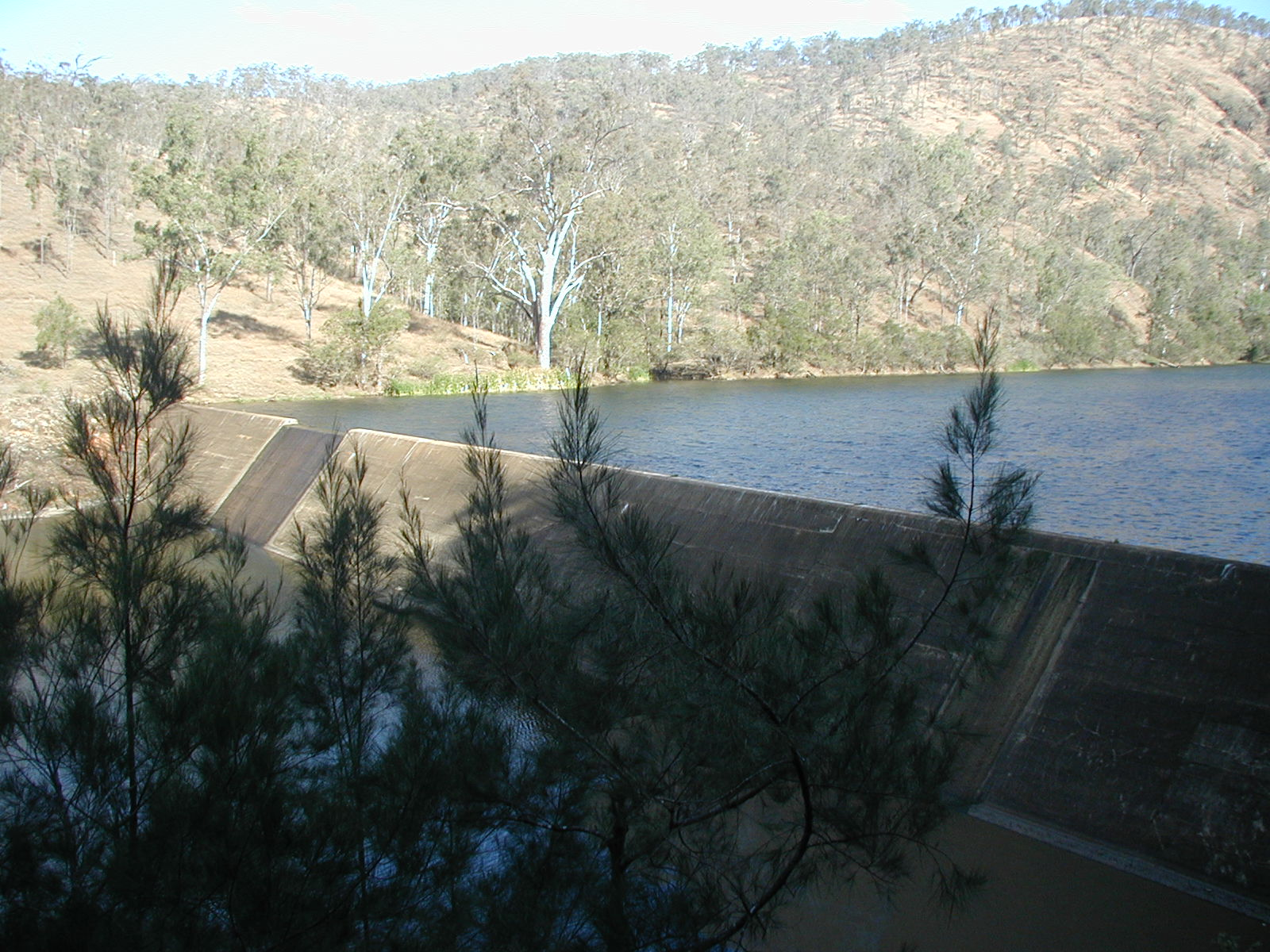

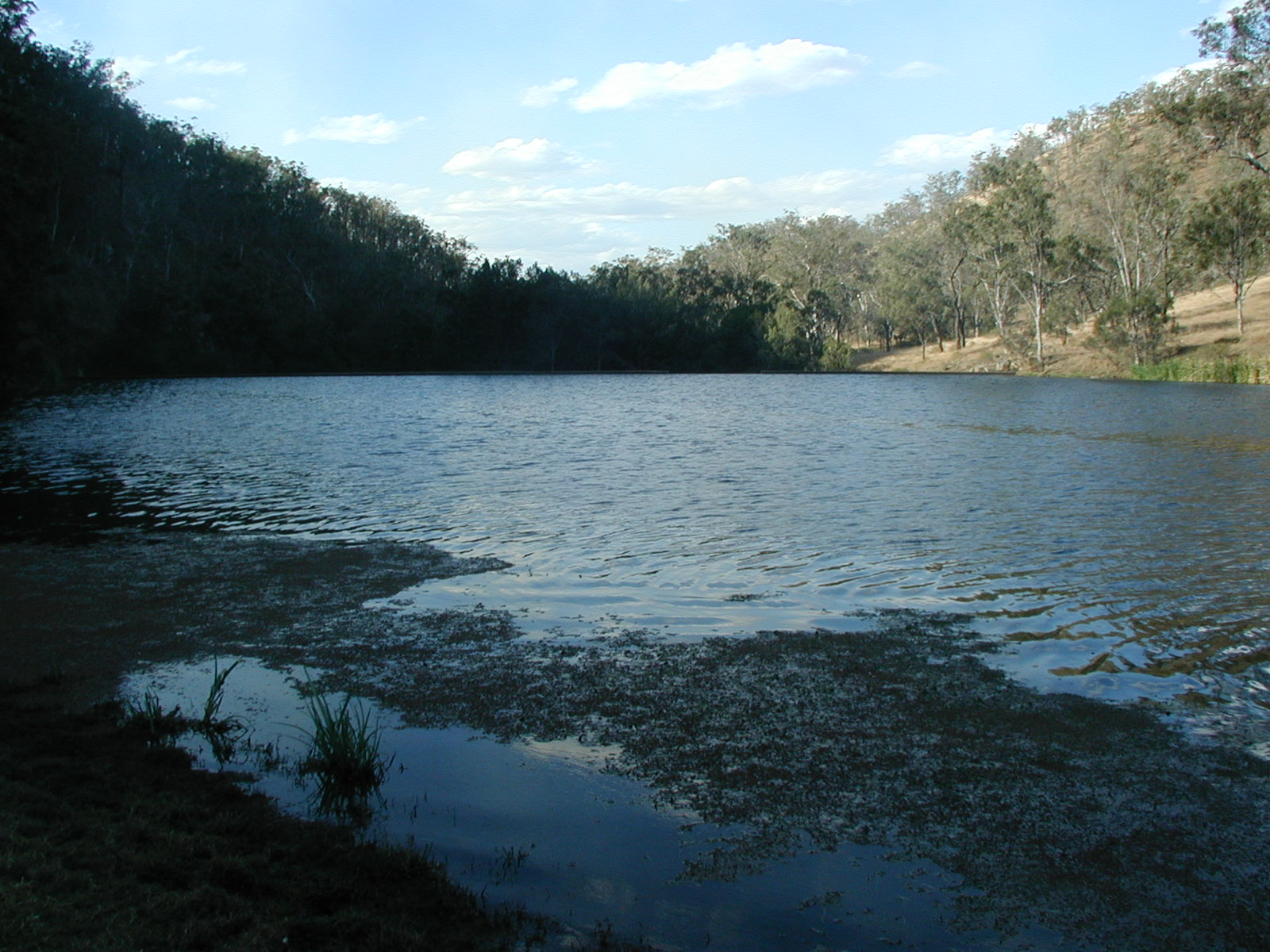

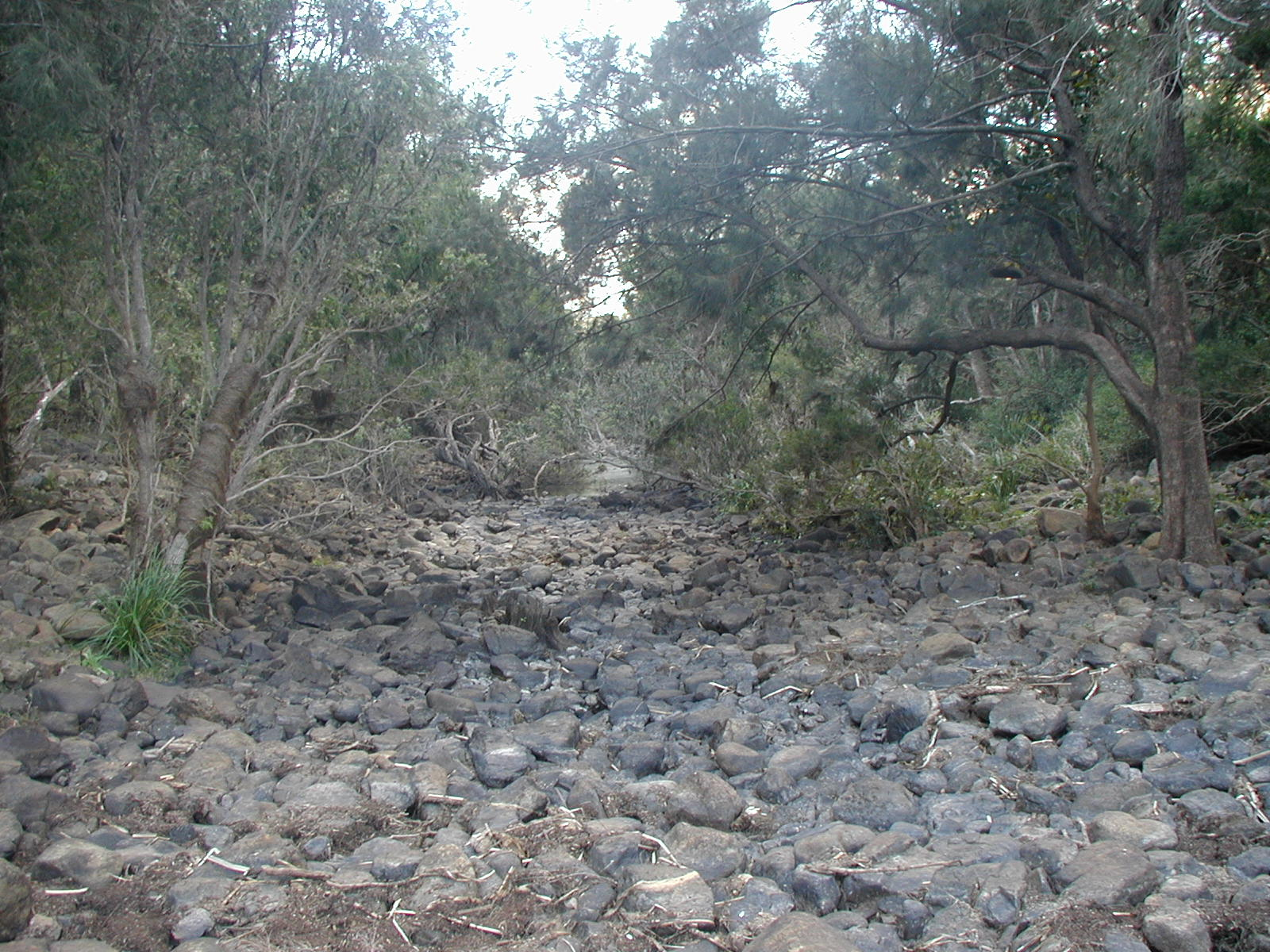

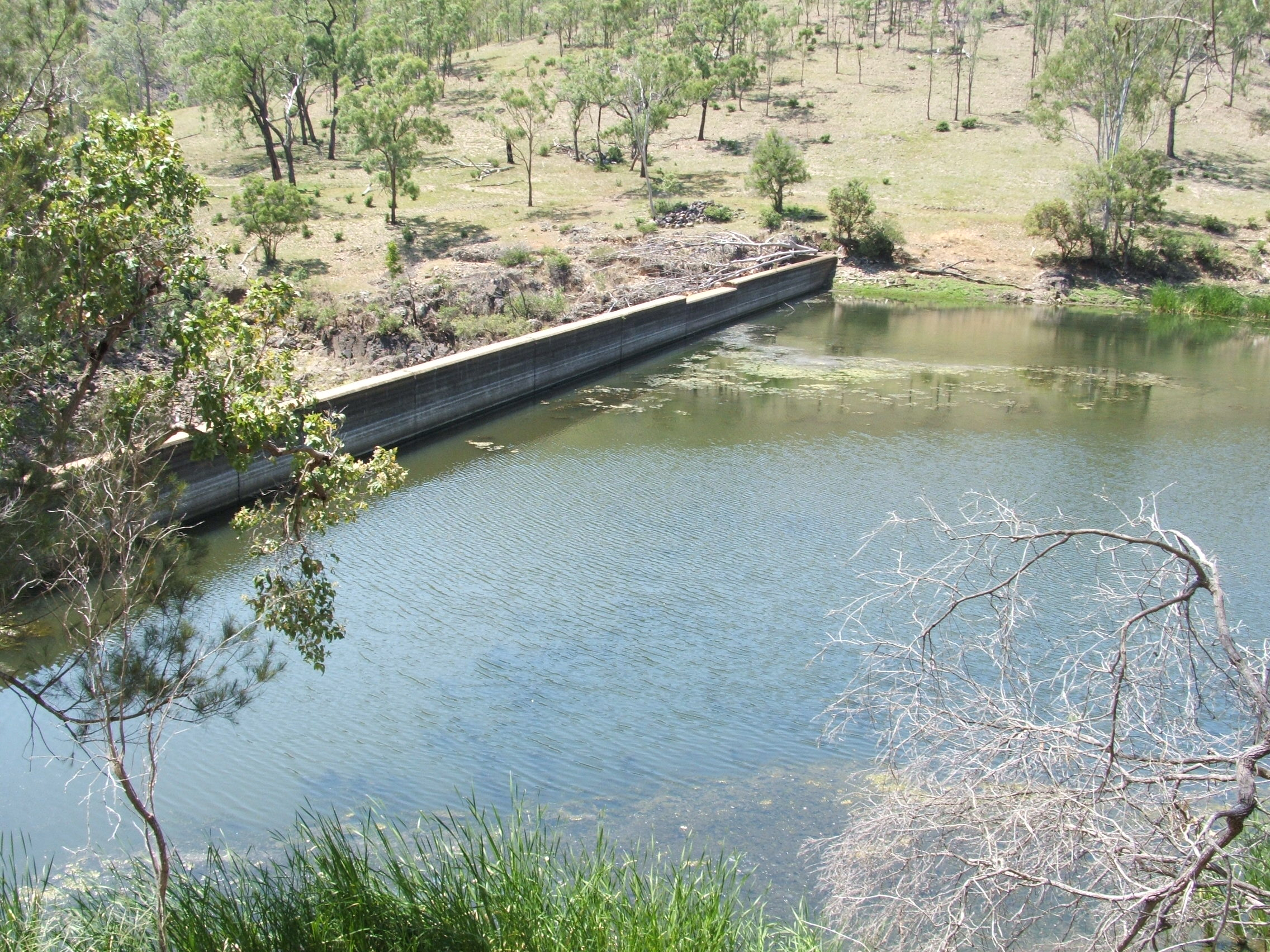

== See also ==
- List of dams and reservoirs in Australia
