= Cedar Grove Weir =

- Location of the weir in Queensland
- Interactive map of Cedar Grove Weir
- Country: Australia
- Location: South East, Queensland
- Coordinates: 27°50′47″S 152°58′30″E
- Purpose: Potable water storage
- Status: Operational
- Construction began: c. 2006
- Opening date: 4 January 2008
- Construction cost: A$18.5 million
- Operator: Seqwater

Dam and spillways
- Type of dam: Weir
- Impounds: Logan River

Reservoir
- Total capacity: 1,039 ML (36.7×10^{6} cu ft)
- Website www.seqwater.com.au

The Cedar Grove Weir is a weir located across the Logan River in the South East region of Queensland, Australia. The main purpose of the weir is for potable water storage.

== Location and features ==
The weir is located 14 kilometres (8.7 mi) northwest of Beaudesert, and 5 kilometres (3.1 mi) southwest of Jimboomba and is connected to the Wyaralong Dam on Teviot Brook and the Bromelton Offstream Storage facility. The project was completed in December 2007 at a cost of A$18.5 million and provides up to 11 megalitres (390×10^{3} cu ft) of water per day. Initially managed by Queensland Water Infrastructure, a body set up to administer major water infrastructure projects, the weir is now managed by Seqwater.

In conjunction with the South Maclean Weir and water treatment plants, the Cedar Grove Weir acts as a pumping pool for captured releases from Wyaralong Dam located upstream; and provides immediate supplies to the Beaudesert region. The weir also connects to the regional South East Queensland Water Grid. The weir overflowed for the first time on 4 January 2008.

== See also ==
- List of dams and weirs in Queensland
