= Kroombit Dam =

Dam in Central Queensland, Australia

- Location of the dam in Queensland
- Interactive map of Kroombit Dam
- Country: Australia
- Location: Biloela, Central Queensland
- Coordinates: 24°25′02″S 150°46′21″E
- Purpose: Irrigation
- Status: Operational
- Opening date: 1992
- Operator: SunWater

Dam and spillways
- Type of dam: Gravity dam
- Impounds: Kroombit Creek
- Height (foundation): 26 m (85 ft)
- Length: 900 m (3,000 ft)
- Dam volume: 372×10^{3} m^{3} (13.1×10^{6} cu ft)
- Spillway type: Uncontrolled
- Spillway capacity: 6,270 m^{3}/s (221,000 cu ft/s)

Reservoir
- Total capacity: 14,600 ML (11,800 acre⋅ft)
- Surface area: 100 ha (250 acres)
- Maximum water depth: 18.6 m (61 ft)
- Normal elevation: 265.8 m (872 ft) AHD

The Kroombit Dam is an earth-fill and concrete gravity dam across the Kroombit Creek, 26 kilometres (16 mi) east of Biloela, in Central Queensland, Australia. The dam was built in 1992 to replenish the groundwater supply to the Callide Irrigation area.

== Overview ==
The dam has a maximum height of 25 metres (82 ft) and used 275,000 cubic metres (9,700,000 cu ft) of zoned earthfill and 100,000 cubic millimetres (6.1 cu in) of RCC and conventional concrete. When full, the resultant reservoir has capacity of 14,600 megalitres (11,800 acre⋅ft), covering 100 hectares (250 acres) at a maximum depth of 18.6 metres (61 ft).

In 2004, SunWater announced plans to upgrade of the dam's spillway capacity.

== See also ==
- List of dams and reservoirs in Australia
