= Belmore Creek Dam =

Dam in north western Queensland, Australia

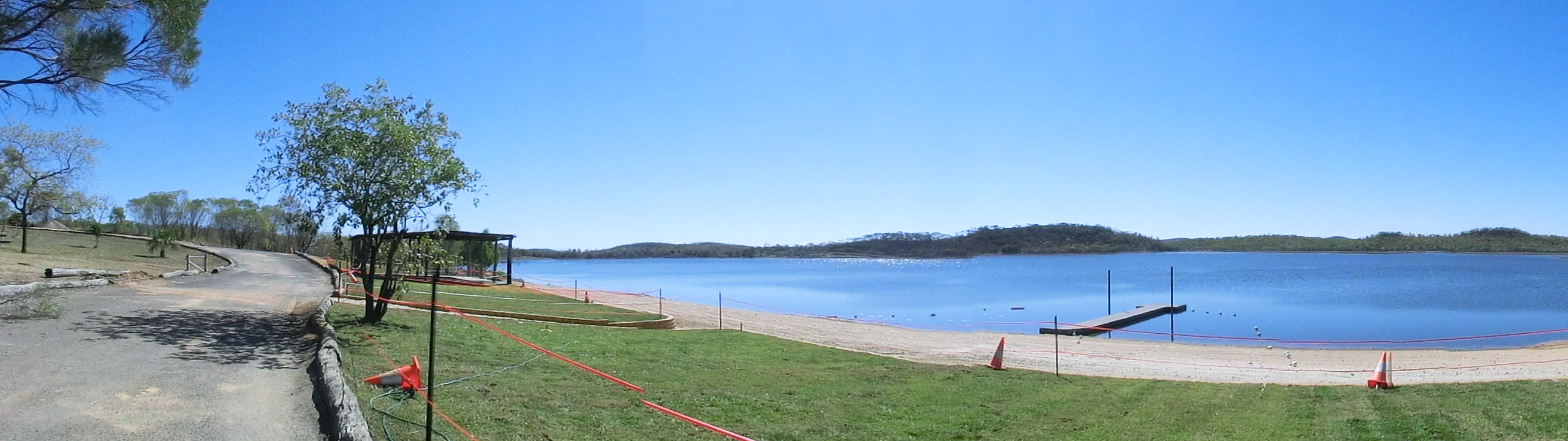
- The shore of Lake Belmore in 2017

- Location of the dam in Queensland
- Interactive map of Belmore Creek Dam
- Country: Australia
- Location: Croydon, North-western Queensland
- Coordinates: 18°10′47″S 142°15′43″E
- Purpose: Water supply
- Status: Operational
- Opening date: 1994
- Built by: Q Birt Pty Ltd
- Owner: Croydon Shire Council

Dam and spillways
- Type of dam: Embankment dam
- Impounds: Belmore Creek
- Height (foundation): 15 m (49 ft)
- Length: 300 m (980 ft)
- Dam volume: 167×10^{3} m^{3} (5.9×10^{6} cu ft)
- Spillway type: Uncontrolled
- Spillway capacity: 886 m^{3}/s (31,300 cu ft/s)

Reservoir
- Creates: Lake Belmore
- Total capacity: 5,200 ML (4,200 acre⋅ft)
- Catchment area: 17 km^{2} (6.6 sq mi)
- Surface area: 112 ha (280 acres)
- Maximum water depth: 4.9 m (16 ft)
- Normal elevation: 131 m (430 ft) AHD

The Belmore Creek Dam is an earth- and rock-filled embankment dam across Belmore Creek, located near Croydon, in north-western Queensland, Australia.

== Overview ==
Completed in 1994, the dam is 15 metres (49 ft) high and 300 metres (980 ft) long. The result reservoir, Lake Belmore, has a capacity of 5,200 megalitres (4,200 acre⋅ft) and is primarily used for the supply of potable water to the town of Croydon.

The reservoir is stocked with barramundi and redclaw crayfish.

== See also ==
- List of reservoirs and dams in Australia
