= Perry River Dam =

Dam near Bundaberg, Queensland, Australia

- Location of the dam in Queensland
- Interactive map of Perry River Dam
- Country: Australia
- Location: Bundaberg, Wide Bay–Burnett, Queensland
- Coordinates: 25°14′12″S 151°47′57″E
- Purpose: Industrial water supply
- Status: Operational
- Opening date: 1996
- Owner: Evolution Mining

Dam and spillways
- Type of dam: Embankment dam
- Impounds: Perry River
- Height (foundation): 12 m (39 ft)
- Length: 104 m (341 ft)

Reservoir
- Total capacity: 1,050 ML (850 acre⋅ft)
- Catchment area: 98 km^{2} (38 sq mi)
- Normal elevation: 98 m (322 ft) AHD

The Perry River Dam is an embankment dam across the Perry River, 68 kilometres (42 mi) south west of Bundaberg, in the Wide Bay–Burnett region of Queensland, Australia.

== Overview ==
The relatively-small roller-compacted concrete embankment dam is 12 metres (39 ft) high and 104 metres (341 ft) long. The resultant reservoir has capacity of 1,050 megalitres (37×10^{6} cu ft), drawing from a catchment area of 98 square kilometres (38 sq mi).

The dam was constructed in 1996 to provide a water supply to Mt Rawdon Gold Mine, located 5 km (3.1 mi) south-west of the dam. The Mt Rawdon project was acquired from Resolute and Samson Exploration by Equigold NL in 1998 and commenced production in February 2001. Since November 2011 the mine has been owned and operated by Evolution Mining. The 2018 Melbourne Cup trophy was made with gold from the Mt Rawdon mine.

The Mt Rawdon mine is expected to complete operations in 2027, investigations are underway to use the mine pit as part of a pumped hydroelectric development, likely involving water diverted from the Perry River Dam.

== See also ==
- List of dams and reservoirs in Australia
