= Nanango Weir =

Weir in Queensland, Australia

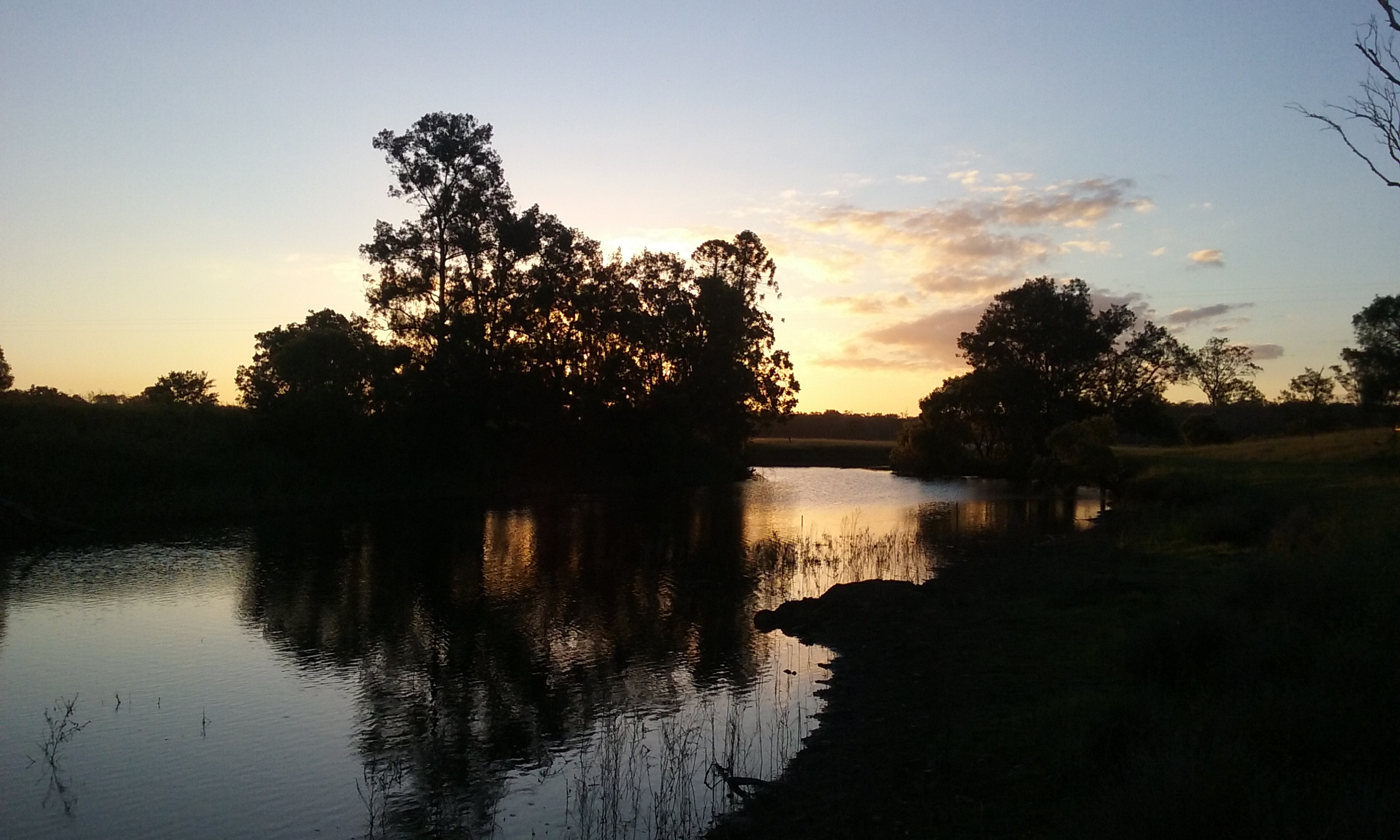
- Dusk at the weir

- Location of the dam in Queensland
- Interactive map of Nanango Weir
- Country: Australia
- Location: Nanango, Wide Bay–Burnett, Queensland
- Coordinates: 26°39′01″S 151°55′28″E
- Purpose: Irrigation
- Status: Operational
- Operator: SunWater

Dam and spillways
- Type of dam: Barrage
- Impounds: Barkers Creek

The Nanango Weir is a minor weir across Barkers Creek, located approximately 9.6 kilometres (6.0 mi) north-west of Nanango, in the Wide Bay–Burnett region of Queensland, Australia.

The weir, located upstream of the Bjelke-Petersen Dam and south of Kingaroy, is part of the Barker Barambah Water Supply Scheme that is administered by SunWater. The original purpose of the weir was for irrigation of adjacent farms for agricultural use, though public recreation is now permitted.

== Recreation ==
The weir is widely unknown to the public because of its unsigned location and small access track. The weir is a great spot for canoeing, picnics and other watersports. There is no constructed boat ramps and large vessels or motors are highly discouraged. The weir is usually full though long dry periods can affect water levels.

== See also ==
- List of dams and reservoirs in Australia
