= Araluen Pumpback Dam =

Minor dam on Canning River, Western Australia

- Interactive map of Araluen Pumpback Dam
- Country: Australia
- Location: Roleystone, City of Armadale, Western Australia
- Coordinates: 32°07′33″S 116°06′18″E
- Purpose: Water storage
- Status: Completed

Dam and spillways
- Impounds: Canning River

The Araluen Pumpback Dam is a minor dam that crosses the Canning River, near Roleystone, in the City of Armadale, on the Darling Ranges in Western Australia.

Water stored in the dam can be pumped back into Canning Dam where the water is treated and distributed through the metropolitan trunk main distribution system.

== See also ==
- List of reservoirs and dams in Australia
