= Ben Anderson Barrage =

Dam in Queensland, Australia

- Interactive map of Ben Anderson Barrage
- Country: Australia
- Location: Bundaberg, Wide Bay–Burnett, Queensland
- Coordinates: 24°53′19″S 152°17′24″E
- Purpose: Irrigation
- Status: Operational
- Operator: Sunwater

Dam and spillways
- Type of dam: Barrage
- Impounds: Burnett River

Reservoir
- Total capacity: 30.3 GL (24,600 acre⋅ft)

The Ben Anderson Barrage is a barrage across the Burnett River, located approximately 26 kilometres (16 mi) from the river mouth, at Burnett Heads. Part of the Bundaberg Irrigation Scheme, the dam is located in the Wide Bay–Burnett region of Queensland, Australia, near the towns of Bundaberg, Gin Gin, and Childers.

The barrage forms part of the Bundaberg Irrigation Scheme – a series of water storages, a channel distribution system, that was developed by the state government. The Ben Anderson Barrage comprises 30.3 gigalitres (24,600 acre⋅ft), the Walla Weir comprises 29.5 gigalitres (23,900 acre⋅ft), and the Bingera Weir comprises 4.8 gigalitres (3,900 acre⋅ft). Collectively, they support 55,000 hectares (140,000 acres) of irrigated land.

== See also ==
- List of dams and reservoirs in Australia
