= Bromelton Dam =

Dam in Queensland, Australia

- Location of the dam in Queensland
- Interactive map of Bromelton Dam
- Country: Australia
- Location: South East Queensland
- Coordinates: 27°56′44″S 152°57′14″E
- Purpose: Potable water supply
- Status: Operational
- Opening date: 2008
- Operator: SEQ Water

Dam and spillways
- Type of dam: Earth fill dam
- Impounds: Off-stream
- Length: 4,110 m (13,480 ft)

Reservoir
- Creates: Bromelton Offstream Storage
- Total capacity: 8,210 ML (1,810×10^{6} imp gal; 2,170×10^{6} US gal)
- Catchment area: 1 km^{2} (0.39 sq mi)
- Surface area: 1 ha (2.5 acres)
- Website www.seqwater.com.au

The Bromelton Dam is an earth-fill embankment dam located off-stream at Gleneagle in the South East region of Queensland, Australia. The main purpose of the dam is for potable water supply of the Beaudesert area. The resultant reservoir is called Bromelton Offstream Storage that, as of 2026, was not in active use.

Since its completion in 2008, Bromelton Offstream Storage delivered an additional 5,000 megalitres (1,100×10^{6} imp gal; 1,300×10^{6} US gal) in water supply capacity, working in conjunction with Cedar Grove Weir and the Wyaralong Dam, that was completed in 2001, to improve the reliability of the Logan River Water Supply Scheme in drought conditions.

== See also ==
- List of dams in Queensland
