= Yellow Pinch Dam =

- Location of the Yellow Pinch Dam in New South Wales
- Location: South Coast, New South Wales, Australia
- Coordinates: 36°51′15″S 149°48′39″E
- Status: Operational
- Opening date: 1987
- Owner: Bega Valley Shire Council

Dam and spillways
- Type of dam: Embankment dam
- Impounds: Yellow Pinch Creek
- Height: 40 metres (130 ft)
- Length: 200 metres (660 ft)
- Dam volume: 198 cubic metres (7,000 cu ft)
- Spillways: 1
- Spillway capacity: 98 cubic metres per second (3,500 cu ft/s)

Reservoir
- Total capacity: 3,000 megalitres (110×10^{6} cu ft)
- Catchment area: 2.7 square kilometres (1.0 sq mi)
- Surface area: 24 hectares (59 acres)
- Website www.begavalley.nsw.gov.au

Yellow Pinch Dam is a major off-stream ungated rockfill embankment dam across the Yellow Pinch Creek upstream of Merimbula in the South Coast region of New South Wales, Australia. The dam's main purpose is water supply. The impounded reservoir is also called Yellow Pinch Dam.

== Location and features ==
Completed in 1987, the Yellow Pinch Dam is a major dam that, while situated across the Yellow Pinch Creek, receives its main inflow from the Tantawanglo Creek via the Tantawanglo Creek Weir, located 35 kilometres (22 mi) from the dam wall. The dam's secondary inflow is received from the Bega River via the Bega to Yellow Pinch Dam pipeline. The dam was built by the NSW Department of Public Works on behalf of the Bega Valley Shire Council to supply water to Merimbula, Tura Beach, Pambula Beach, Pambula and rural properties. The Yellow Pinch Dam, together with Ben Boyd Dam and Tilba Dam, also both off-stream, are used for storing water for town water supply, with water pumped, or piped by gravity, from a source water intake. The dams have small catchment areas and rainfall in the dam catchment areas contributes only a minor proportion of the volume of water collected and stored.

The dam wall constructed with 198 cubic metres (7,000 cu ft) of rockfill with an internal earth core is 40 metres (130 ft) high and 200 metres (660 ft) long. At 100% capacity the dam wall holds back 3,000 megalitres (110×10^{6} cu ft) of water. The surface area of Yellow Pinch Dam is 24 hectares (59 acres) and the catchment area is a relatively small 2.7 square kilometres (1.0 sq mi). The spillway is capable of discharging 98 cubic metres per second (3,500 cu ft/s).

=== Bega to Yellow Pinch Dam Water Transfer Pipeline ===
The A$10 million federally-funded Bega to Yellow Pinch Dam Water Transfer Pipeline and pumping stations provides an additional source of water to secure water supplies for the Bega Valley Shire. The project commenced in 2007 and involved the construction of a high lift pump station, capable of pumping up to 20 megalitres (710×10^{3} cu ft) per day from the lower Bega River and Bega borefields. This water is carried through a 20 kilometres (12 mi) pipeline to Yellow Pinch Dam. The benefits of the project include the protection of low environmental flows at Tantawanglo Creek by extracting and storing larger volumes of water during high Bega River flows; the increased security of supply to townships in the south of the Bega Valley Shire through the use of water from the lower Bega River; and providesfor greater flexibility and availability of water for landholder extraction in the upper catchment.

== See also ==
- Irrigation in Australia
- List of dams and reservoirs in New South Wales
