= Joe Sippel Weir =

- Location of the weir in Queensland
- Country: Australia
- Location: Murgon, Queensland
- Coordinates: 26°15′53.76″S 151°54′56.25″E
- Purpose: Irrigation, recreation
- Status: Operational
- Opening date: 1984; 42 years ago
- Operator: SunWater

Dam and spillways
- Type of dam: Concrete stepped weir
- Impounds: Barambah Creek
- Height: 6.5 m (21 ft)

Reservoir
- Total capacity: 712 ML (577 acre⋅ft)

The Joe Sippel Weir is a 6.5-metre-high (21 ft) stepped weir located on Barambah Creek, west of Murgon, Queensland, Australia. Completed in 1984 using steel sheet piles and concrete slabs, the 712-megalitre (577 acre⋅ft) weir was constructed downstream of Bjelke-Petersen Dam to help provide irrigation water for the surrounding farms.

== See also ==
- List of dams and reservoirs in Australia
