= Teviot Creek Dam =

Dam in Queensland, Australia

- Location of the dam in Queensland
- Interactive map of Teviot Creek Dam
- Country: Australia
- Location: Central Queensland
- Coordinates: 21°38′47″S 148°13′08″E
- Purpose: Water supply
- Status: Operational
- Opening date: 2001
- Built by: Burton Coal Pty Ltd
- Operator: RAG Australia Coal

Dam and spillways
- Type of dam: Earth fill dam
- Impounds: Teviot Creek
- Height (foundation): 28 m (92 ft)
- Length: 129 m (423 ft)
- Spillway type: Uncontrolled
- Spillway capacity: 6,400 m^{3}/s (230,000 cu ft/s)

Reservoir
- Total capacity: 2,600 ML (2,100 acre⋅ft)
- Catchment area: 760 km^{2} (290 sq mi)
- Normal elevation: 357 m (1,171 ft) AHD

The Teviot Creek Dam is an earth-filled embankment dam across the Teviot Creek, located approximately 140 kilometres (87 mi) southwest of Mackay, in Central Queensland, Australia. The dam supplies industrial water for a coal mine.

== Overview ==
Completed in 2001, the dam is 8 metres (26 ft) high and 129 metres (423 ft) long. The resultant 2,600-megalitre (2,100 acre⋅ft) reservoir draws from a catchment area of 760 square kilometres (290 sq mi).

The Teviot Creek is a tributary of the Isaac River, upstream of the Burton Gorge Dam.

Burton Coal Pty Ltd, who built the dam, have a licence to draw 1,500 megalitres (1,200 acre⋅ft) per year from the dam. The monthly supply reliability based on a relatively short period of record is thought to be 100%. This does not account for the current critical period and the supply should not necessarily be relied on in future. The Teviot Creek Dam is owned and operated by RAG Australia Coal subsidiaries.

== See also ==
- List of dams and reservoirs in Australia
