= Karlgarin Reservoir =

Reservoir in Western Australia

Coordinates: 32°29′51″S 118°43′08″E

Karlgarin Reservoir is situated adjacent the wheatbelt town of Karlgarin, Western Australia. The reservoir is filled from runoff from a bitumen catchment. The water caught in the reservoir was originally then pumped up to a high level tank for the town use. With the advent of the Great Southern Towns Water Supply Scheme, where water is sent through the Wheatbelt from the Harris Dam, the Karlgarin Reservoir water is only used in emergencies.
