= Middle Creek Dam =

Dam in North Queensland, Australia

- Location of the dam in Queensland
- Interactive map of Middle Creek Dam
- Country: Australia
- Location: Mackay Region, North Queensland
- Coordinates: 21°28′06″S 149°06′22″E
- Purpose: Potable water supply
- Status: Operational
- Opening date: 1959
- Built by: Sarina Shire Council; Plane Creek Sugar Mill
- Operator: Mackay Regional Council

Dam and spillways
- Type of dam: Embankment dam
- Impounds: Middle Creek
- Height (foundation): 26 m (85 ft)
- Length: 130 m (430 ft)
- Dam volume: 55×10^{3} m^{3} (1.9×10^{6} cu ft)
- Spillway type: Uncontrolled
- Spillway capacity: 260 m^{3}/s (9,200 cu ft/s)

Reservoir
- Total capacity: 1,486 ML (327×10^{6} imp gal)
- Catchment area: 7.4 km^{2} (2.9 sq mi)

The Middle Creek Dam is an earth- and rock-filled embankment dam across Middle Creek, located at the head waters of Plane Creek, west of Sarina, in the Mackay Region of North Queensland, Australia.

The dam was completed in 1959 by the Sarina Shire Council and Plane Creek Sugar Mill to augment water supply from two weirs downstream, built in 1926 and 1935 respectively. The dam is 26 metres (85 ft) high and 130 metres (430 ft) long. The resultant reservoir has a small catchment of 7.4 square kilometres (2.9 sq mi) and a capacity of 1,486 megalitres (52.5×10^{6} cu ft). The dam wall and uncontrolled spillway were upgraded by Mackay Regional Council in 2015 to improve flood capacity.

The dam is used for water skiing by the Sarina Ski Club.

== See also ==
- List of dams and reservoirs in Australia
