= Tumut (disambiguation) =

Tumut may refer to several topics:

- Tumut, a town in the Riverina region of New South Wales, Australia
  - Tumut Airport, the airport within the town of Tumut
- Tumut River, a river that flows through the district surrounding Tumut
  - Tumut Hydroelectric Power Station, a series of three hydroelectric power stations on the Tumut River, that are part of the Snowy Mountains Scheme
    - Tumut 1
    - Tumut 2
    - Tumut 3
  - Tumut Pond Dam and Tumut Two Dam, two reservoirs that impound the Tumut River for the purpose of assisting the generation of hydroelectricity
- Tumut Shire, a former local government authority of the area
- Tumut and Kunama railway lines, a disused railway line of the area
