= Deep Creek Dam (New South Wales) =

- Location of Deep Creek Dam in New South Wales
- Location: Snowy Mountains, New South Wales, Australia
- Coordinates: 36°00′35.7″S 148°20′37.2″E
- Status: Operational
- Opening date: 1961
- Owner: Snowy Hydro

Dam and spillways
- Type of dam: Gravity dam
- Impounds: Deep Creek
- Height: 21.3 metres (70 ft)
- Length: 54.9 metres (180 ft)
- Dam volume: 4,080 cubic metres (144,000 cu ft)
- Spillways: 1
- Spillway type: Uncontrolled
- Spillway capacity: 312 cubic metres per second (11,000 cu ft/s)

Reservoir
- Creates: Deep Creek Reservoir
- Total capacity: 11 megalitres (390×10^{3} cu ft)
- Catchment area: 9.68 square kilometres (3.74 sq mi)
- Surface area: 2 hectares (4.9 acres)

Deep Creek Dam is a major ungated concrete gravity dam across the Deep Creek in the Snowy Mountains of New South Wales, Australia. The dam's main purpose is for the diversion of water for generation of hydro-power and is the smallest of the sixteen major dams that comprise the Snowy Mountains Scheme, a vast hydroelectricity and irrigation complex constructed in south-east Australia between 1949 and 1974 and now run by Snowy Hydro.

The impounded reservoir is called the Deep Creek Reservoir.

== Location and features ==
Completed in 1961, Deep Creek Dam is a major dam, located within the Snowy Valleys local government area. The dam was constructed based on engineering plans developed under contract by the Snowy Mountains Hydroelectric Authority.

The dam wall comprising 4,000 cubic metres (140,000 cu ft) of concrete is 21 metres (69 ft) high and 55 metres (180 ft) long. At 100% capacity the dam wall holds back 11 megalitres (390×10^{3} cu ft) of water. The surface area of Deep Creek Reservoir is 2 hectares (4.9 acres) and the catchment area is 9.68 square kilometres (3.74 sq mi). The uncontrolled spillway is capable of discharging 312 cubic metres per second (11,000 cu ft/s).

The water behind the dam is diverted into the Tooma – Tumut Tunnel through a siphon intake along with 3 other intakes on the Tunnel to Tumut Pond Reservoir, for use in the Tumut Valley Power Stations.
Below the dam wall, Deep Creek flows into the Tooma River, before emptying into the Murray River within the Murray–Darling basin.

== See also ==
- Kosciuszko National Park
- List of dams and reservoirs in New South Wales
- Snowy Hydro Limited
- Snowy Mountains Scheme
- Snowy Scheme Museum
