= Guthega Dam =

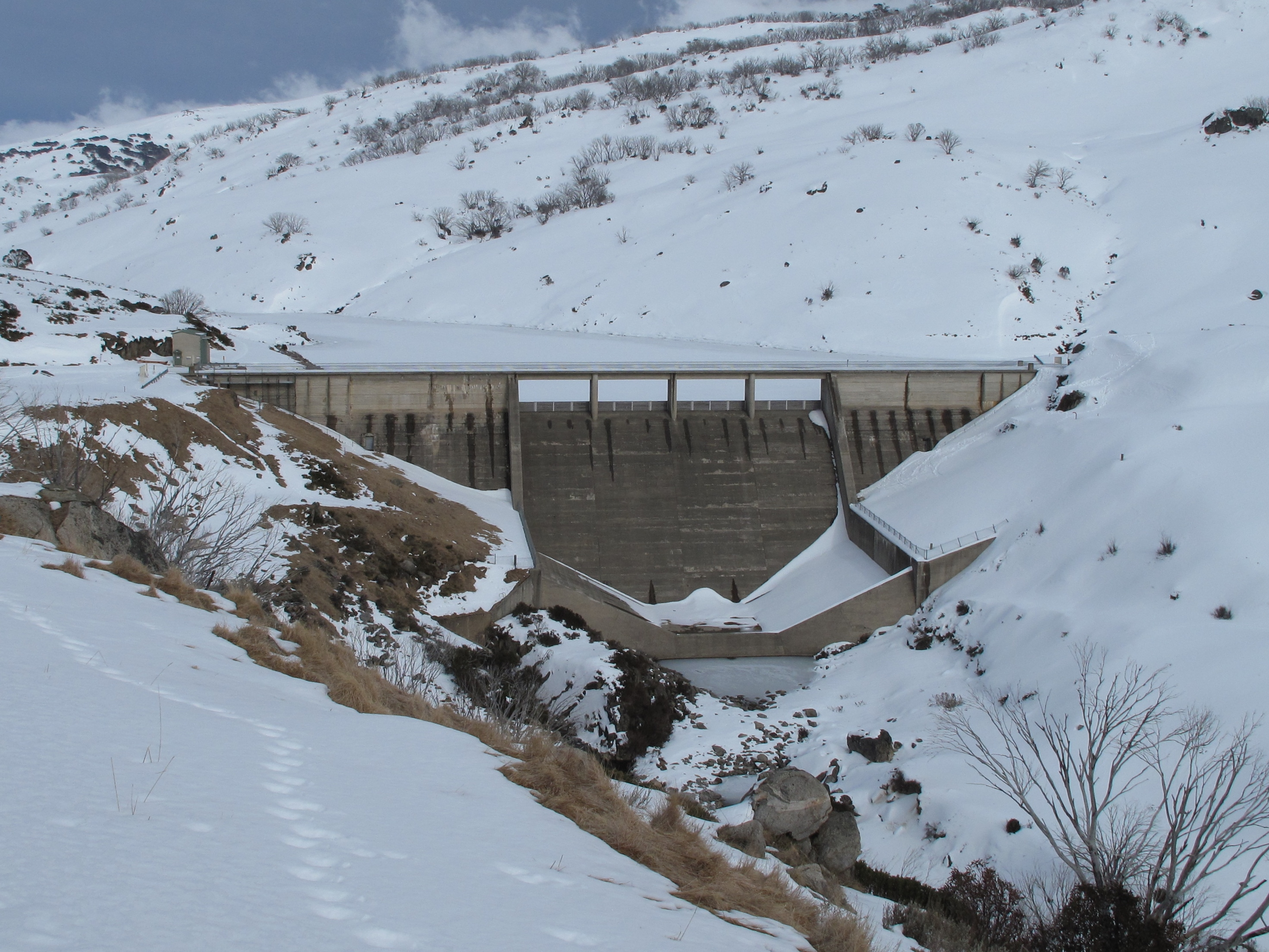
- Guthega dam in winter

- Location of the Guthega Dam in New South Wales
- Country: Australia
- Location: Snowy Mountains, New South Wales
- Coordinates: 36°22′50″S 148°22′09″E
- Status: Operational
- Opening date: 1955
- Owner: Snowy Hydro

Dam and spillways
- Type of dam: Gravity dam
- Impounds: Snowy River
- Height: 34 metres (112 ft)
- Length: 139 metres (456 ft)
- Dam volume: 44,100 cubic metres (1,560,000 cu ft)
- Spillways: 1
- Spillway type: Uncontrolled
- Spillway capacity: 1,416 cubic metres per second (50,000 cu ft/s)

Reservoir
- Creates: Guthega Pondage
- Total capacity: 1,604 megalitres (56.6×10^{6} cu ft)
- Catchment area: 91 square kilometres (35 sq mi)
- Surface area: 19.4 hectares (48 acres)

Power Station
- Operator: Snowy Hydro
- Commission date: 1955
- Type: Conventional
- Hydraulic head: 246.9 metres (810 ft)
- Turbines: 2
- Installed capacity: 60 megawatts (80,000 hp)

Guthega Dam is a concrete gravity dam with an uncontrolled spillway across the Snowy River in the Snowy Mountains of New South Wales, Australia. The dam's main purpose is the storage of water used in the generation of hydro-power. It was the first of sixteen major dams to be completed for the Snowy Mountains Scheme, a vast hydroelectricity and irrigation complex constructed in south-east Australia between 1949 and 1974 now run by Snowy Hydro.

The impounded reservoir is called Guthega Pondage.

== Location and features ==
Guthega dam is one of the sixteen major dams of the Snowy Mountains Scheme. It was completed in 1955 and is located 5 kilometres (3.1 mi) northwest of Perisher Valley, in the Kosciuszko National Park. The dam was constructed by Semler Engineering based on engineering plans developed under contract by the Snowy Mountains Hydroelectric Authority, with Albert Francis Ronalds as Chief Civil Design Engineer.

The dam wall, comprising 44,100 cubic metres (1,560,000 cu ft) of concrete, is 34 metres (112 ft) high and 139 metres (456 ft) long. The uncontrolled spillway is capable of discharging reservoir overflow at rates up to 1,416 cubic metres per second (50,000 cu ft/s). At 100% capacity the dam wall holds back 1,604 megalitres (56.6×10^{6} cu ft) of water with a surface area of 19.4 hectares (48 acres). The catchment area is 91 square kilometres (35 sq mi), including the Guthega river, Pounds creek, Farm creek and the upper reaches of the Snowy River.

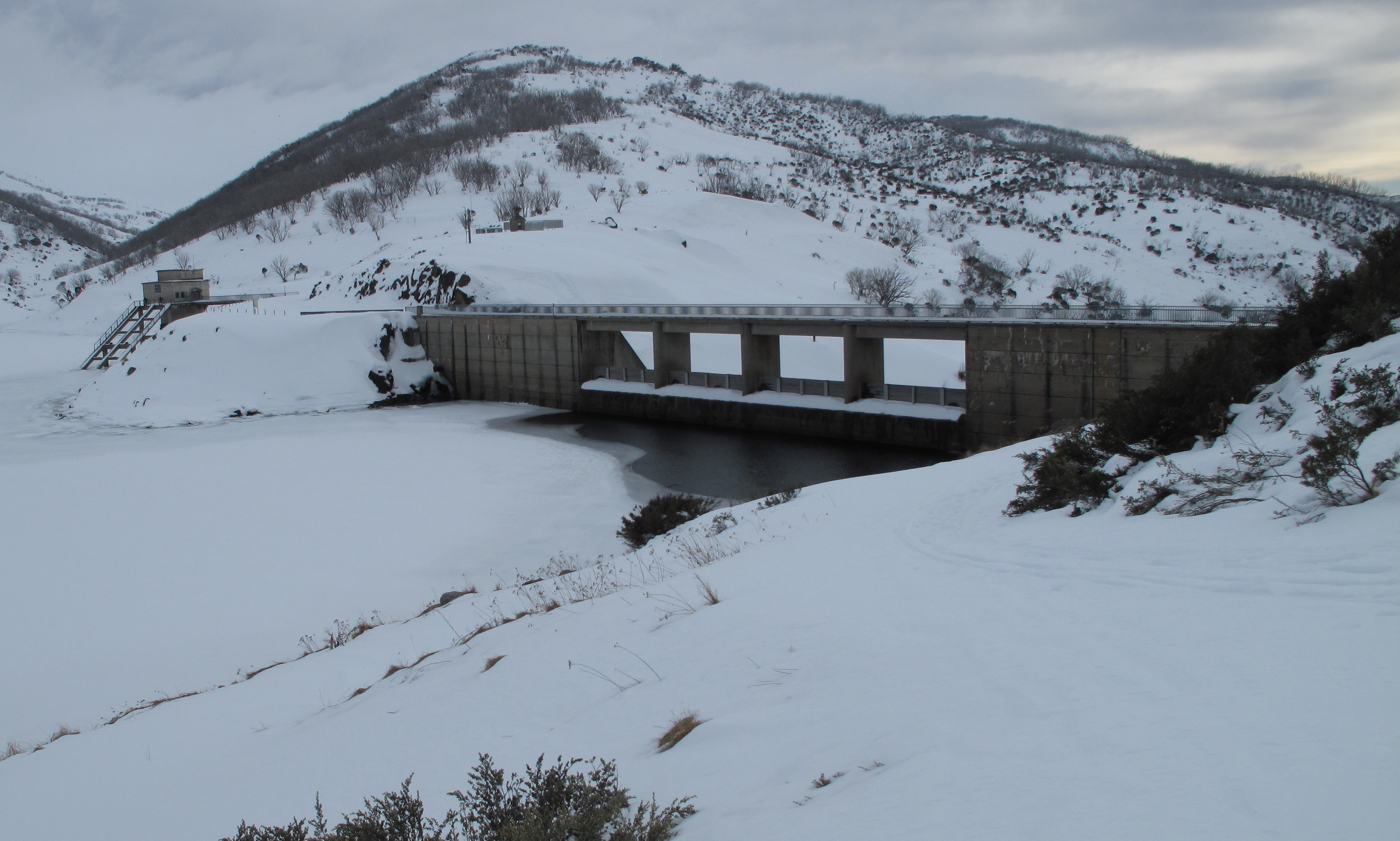
Guthega dam: upstream face

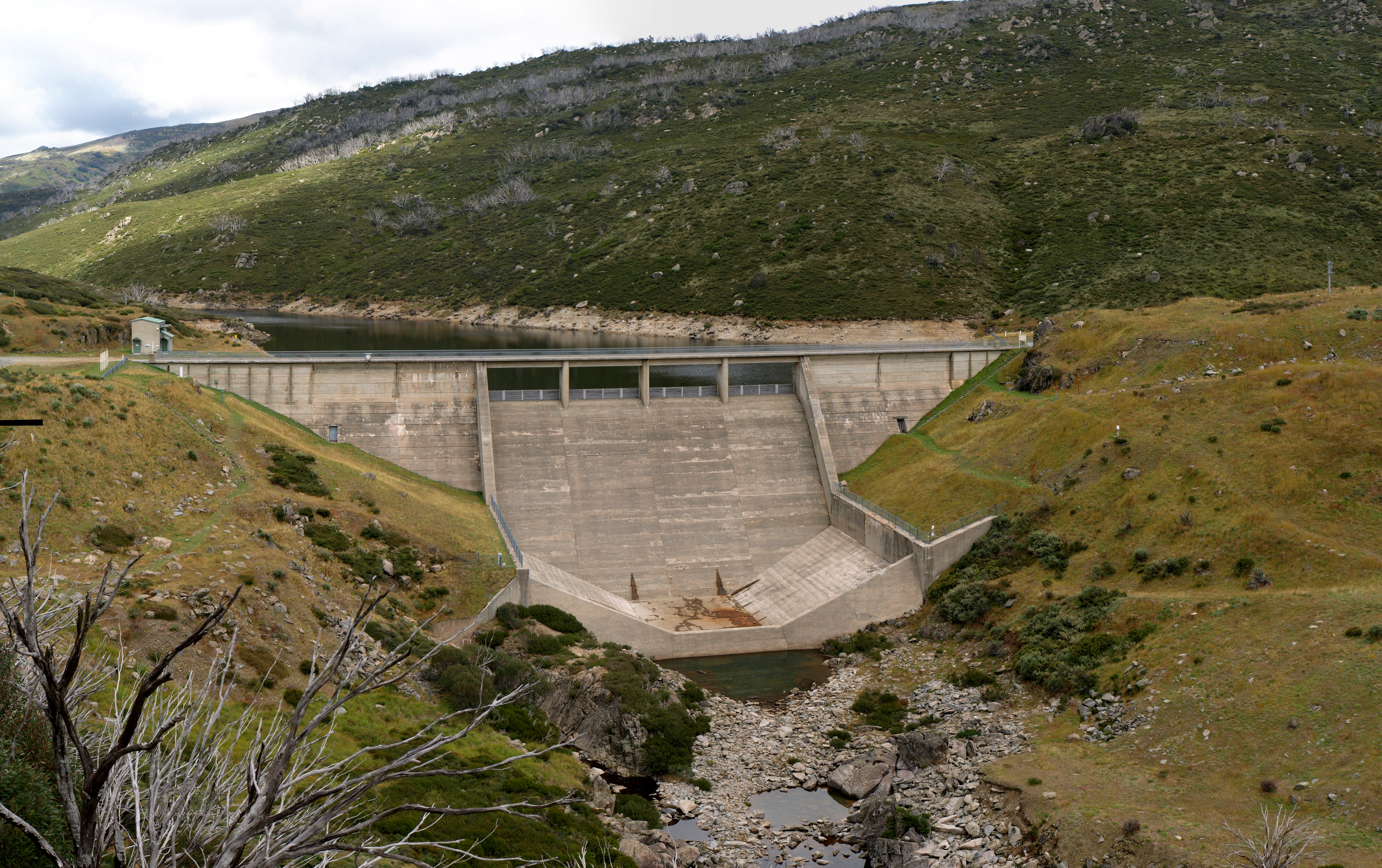
Autumn season

=== Power generation ===
Approximately 5.5 kilometres (3.4 mi) downstream of the dam wall and using water from Guthega Pondage, is the above ground Guthega conventional hydroelectric power station. Commenced in 1951 and completed in 1955, the power station has two Francis turbines comprising English Electric generators, with a combined generating capacity of 60 megawatts (80,000 hp) of electricity; a net generation of 172 gigawatt-hours (620 TJ) per annum; and has 246.9 metres (810 ft) rated hydraulic head. Water flows through the turbines at the rate of 28.3 cubic metres per second (1,000 cu ft/s).

== See also ==
- Kosciuszko National Park
- List of dams and reservoirs in New South Wales
- Snowy Hydro Limited
- Snowy Mountains Scheme
- Snowy Scheme Museum
