= Tumut Two Dam =

- Location of Tumut Two Dam in New South Wales
- Country: Australia
- Location: Snowy Mountains, New South Wales
- Coordinates: 35°55′54″S 148°21′04″E
- Purpose: Hydro-power, diversion, irrigation
- Status: Operational
- Opening date: 1961
- Owner: Snowy Hydro

Dam and spillways
- Type of dam: Gravity dam
- Impounds: Tumut River
- Height: 46 m (151 ft)
- Length: 119 m (390 ft)
- Dam volume: 48 m^{3} (1,700 cu ft)
- Spillways: 1
- Spillway capacity: 2,152 m^{3}/s (76,000 cu ft/s)

Reservoir
- Creates: Tumut Two Reservoir
- Total capacity: 2,677 ML (94.5×10^{6} cu ft)
- Catchment area: 396 km^{2} (153 sq mi)
- Surface area: 182 ha (450 acres)

Power Station
- Operator: Snowy Hydro
- Commission date: 1962
- Type: Conventional
- Hydraulic head: 292.6 m (960 ft)
- Turbines: 4
- Installed capacity: 286 MW (384,000 hp)
- Annual generation: 787 GWh (2,830 TJ)

Tumut Two Dam or Tumut Two (/ˈtjuːmət/) is a major ungated concrete gravity dam across the upper reaches of the Tumut River in the Snowy Mountains of New South Wales, Australia. The dam, whose main purpose is to generate hydro-power, is one of the sixteen major dams that comprise the Snowy Mountains Scheme, a vast hydroelectricity and irrigation complex constructed in south-east Australia between 1949 and 1974 and afterwards run by Snowy Hydro.

The impounded reservoir is called the Tumut Two Reservoir, or less formally, the Tumut Two Pondage.

== Location and features ==
Completed in 1961, Tumut Two Dam is a major dam, located approximately 3 kilometres (1.9 mi) west of Cabramurra. The dam was constructed by a consortium comprising Kaiser-Walsh-Perini-Raymond based on engineering plans developed by the Snowy Mountains Hydroelectric Authority and the United States Bureau of Reclamation under contract from the Snowy Mountains Hydroelectric Authority.

The dam wall comprising 48 cubic metres (1,700 cu ft) of concrete is 46 metres (151 ft) high and 119 metres (390 ft) long. At 100% capacity the dam wall holds back 2,677 megalitres (94.5×10^{6} cu ft) of water. The surface area of Tumut Two Reservoir is 182 hectares (450 acres) and the catchment area is 396 square kilometres (153 sq mi). The spillway is capable of discharging 2,152 cubic metres per second (76,000 cu ft/s).

=== Power generation ===
Downstream of the dam wall and located underground is Tumut 2, a conventional hydroelectric power station, that has four turbine generators, with a generating capacity of 286 megawatts (384,000 hp) of electricity; and a net generation of 787 gigawatt-hours (2,830 TJ) per annum. The power station has 262.1 metres (860 ft) rated hydraulic head. The underground powerhouse is located 244 metres (801 ft) below ground level.

=== Tumut Two Reservoir ===
Tumut Two Reservoir or Tumut Two Pondage (sometimes also Tumut 2 Reservoir/Tumut 2 Pondage) is formed by the Tumut Two Dam. Snowmelt and other runoff enter the reservoir from the upper Tumut River and the dam impounds the river's natural flow above the Tumut Pond Dam wall and the Tumut Pond Reservoir.

Water from the reservoir, after passing over the spillway of the Tumut Pond Dam, flows downstream, above the underground Tumut 1 Power Station, and into the impounded waters of Talbingo Reservoir, formed by the Talbingo Dam; past Tumut 3 Power Station, into Jounama Pondage, formed by Jounama Dam; and then into Blowering Reservoir, formed by Blowering Dam, passing through Blowering Power Stations. The natural flow of the Tumut River continues into the Riverina region.

== See also ==
- List of dams and reservoirs in New South Wales
