= Snowy Mountains Scheme =

Hydroelectricity and irrigation complex in the Snowy Mountains, Australia

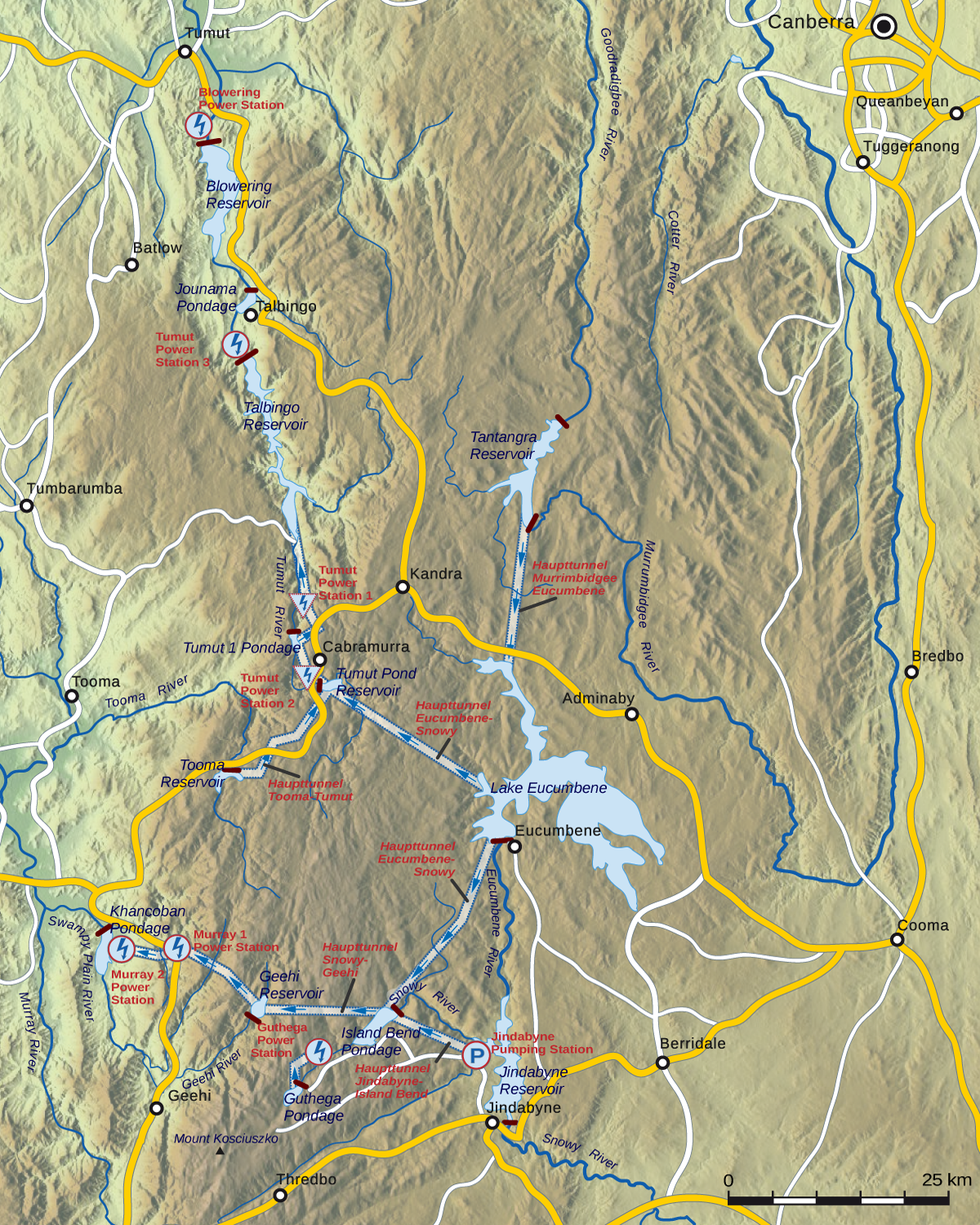
- Map of Snowy Mountains Scheme
- Interactive map of Snowy Mountains Scheme
- Country: Australia
- Location: Kosciuszko National Park, New South Wales
- Coordinates: 36.12°S 148.6°E
- Purpose: Hydroelectricity and irrigation project
- Status: Operational
- Construction began: 17 October 1949
- Opening date: 21 October 1972
- Construction cost: A$820 million
- Operator: Snowy Hydro Limited

The Snowy Mountains Scheme, also known as the Snowy Hydro or the Snowy scheme, is a hydroelectricity and irrigation complex in south-east Australia. Near the border of New South Wales and Victoria, the scheme consists of sixteen major dams; nine power stations; two pumping stations; and 225 kilometres (140 mi) of tunnels, pipelines and aqueducts that were constructed between 1949 and 1974. The scheme was completed under the supervision of Chief Engineer, Sir William Hudson. It is the largest engineering project undertaken in Australia.

The water of the Snowy River and some of its tributaries, much of which formerly flowed southeast onto the river flats of East Gippsland, and into Bass Strait of the Tasman Sea, is captured at high elevations and diverted inland to the Murray and Murrumbidgee Rivers irrigation areas. The scheme includes two major tunnel systems constructed through the continental divide of the Snowy Mountains, known in Australia as the Great Dividing Range. The water falls 800 metres (2,600 ft) and travels through large hydro-electric power stations which generate peak-load power for the Australian Capital Territory, New South Wales and Victoria. The Scheme also provides some security of water flows to the Murray-Darling basin, providing approximately 2,100 gigalitres (7.4×10^{10} cu ft) of water a year to the basin for use in Australia's irrigated agriculture industry.

In 2016, the Snowy Mountains Scheme was added to the Australian National Heritage List.

== History ==
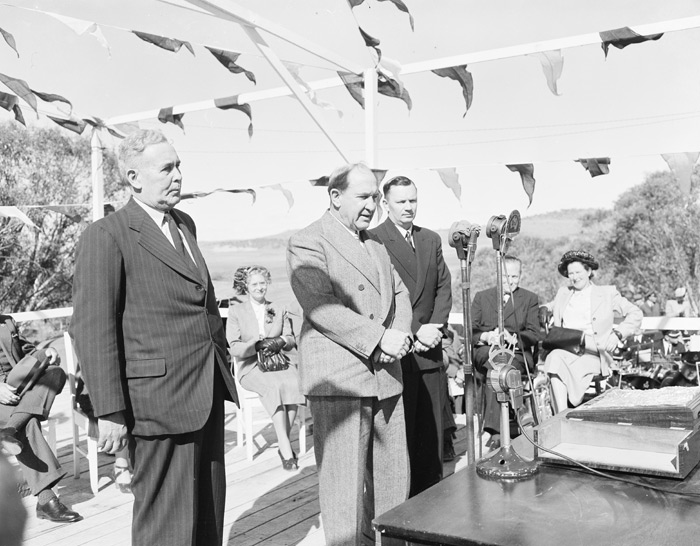
Official launch of the Snowy Mountains Scheme at Adaminaby. From the left, Prime Minister, Ben Chifley; Governor-General, William McKell and Minister for Works and Housing, Nelson Lemmon, 1949.

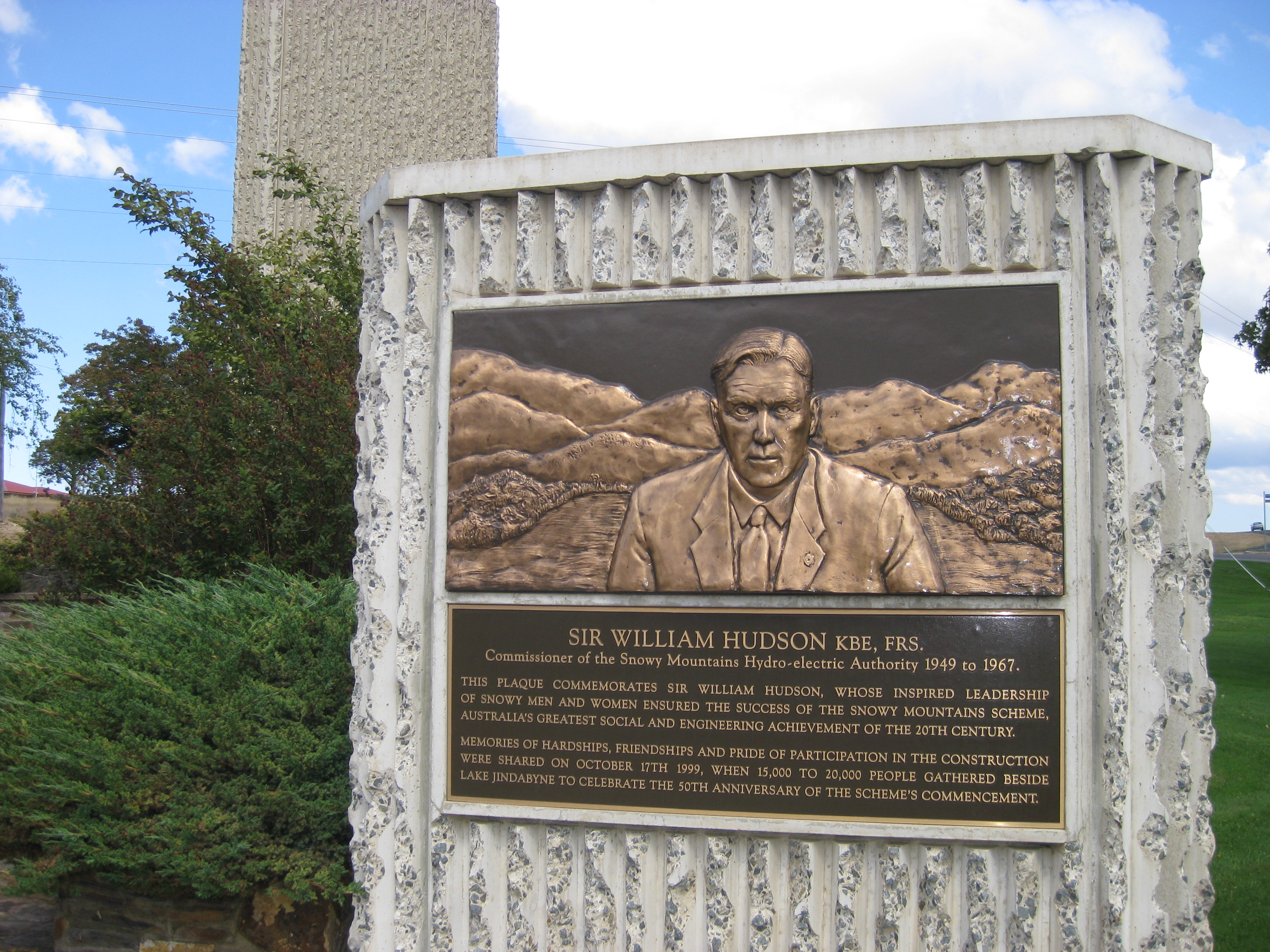
William Hudson KBE FRS Commissioner Snowy Mountains Hydro Electric Authority 1949-1967. Plaque at Cooma Visitors Centre.

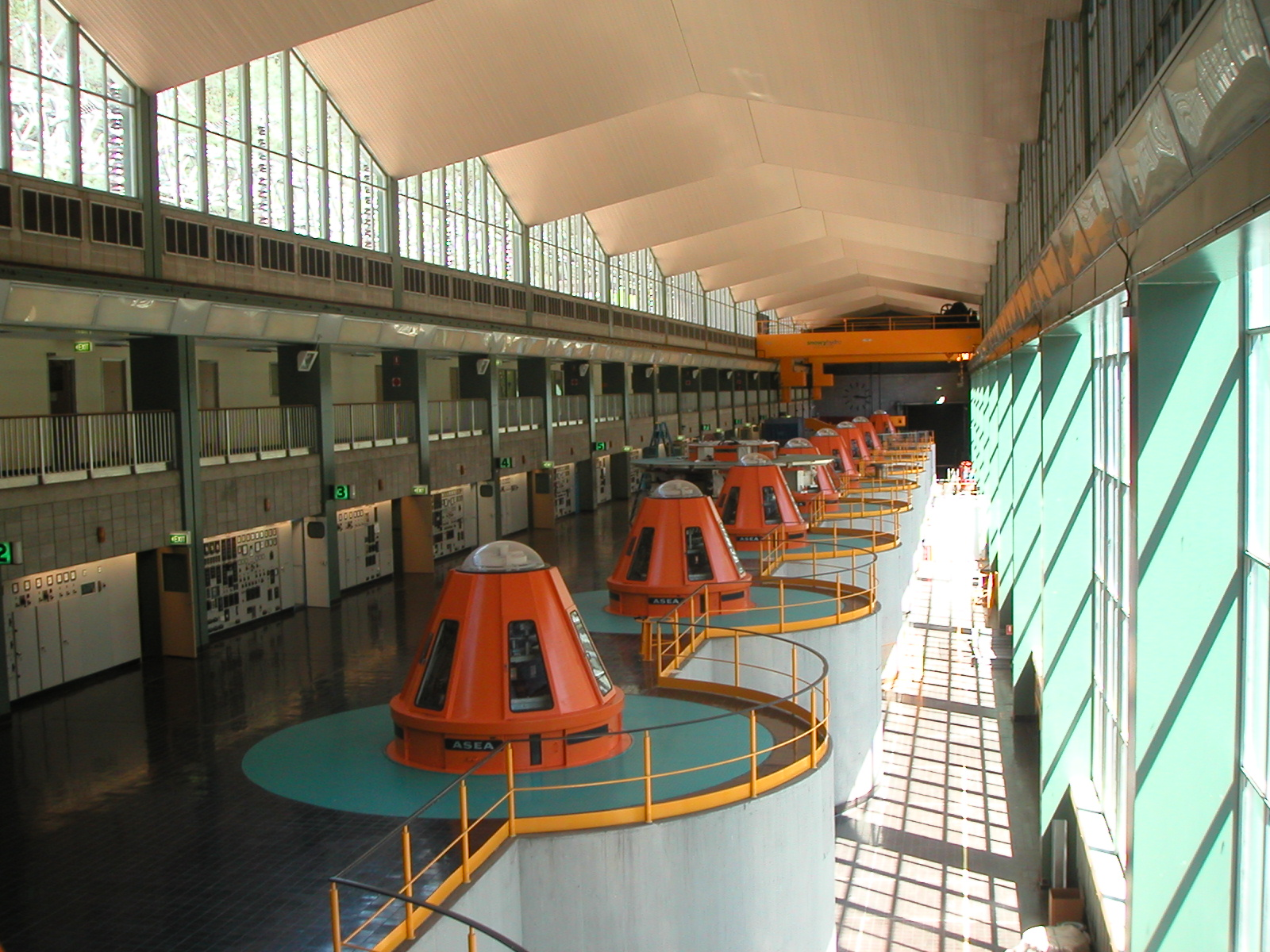
The Machine Hall Floor of Murray-1 Hydroelectric Power Station

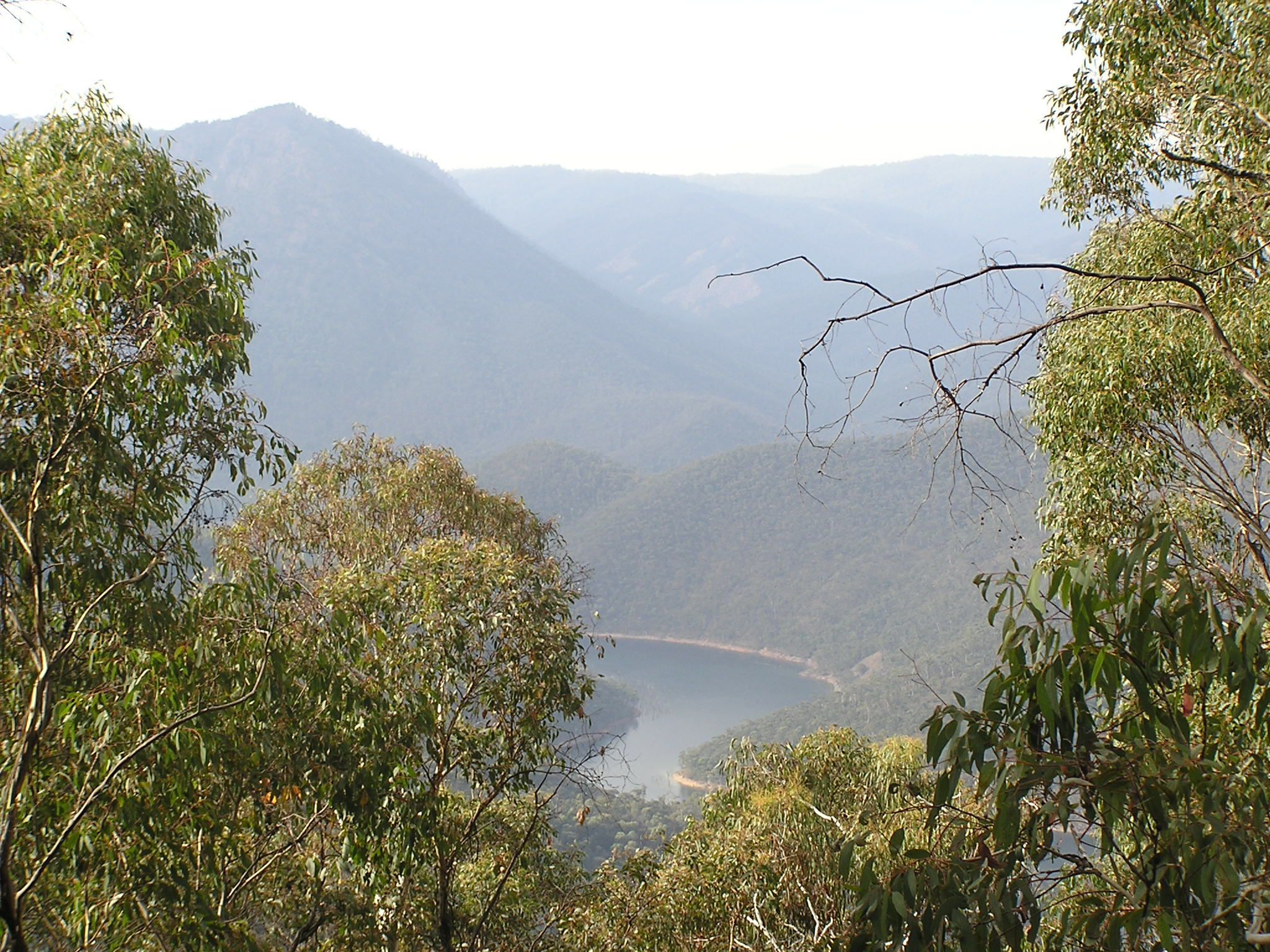
Talbingo Dam. 16 major dams store water in the scheme. Many were constructed in rugged wilderness areas.

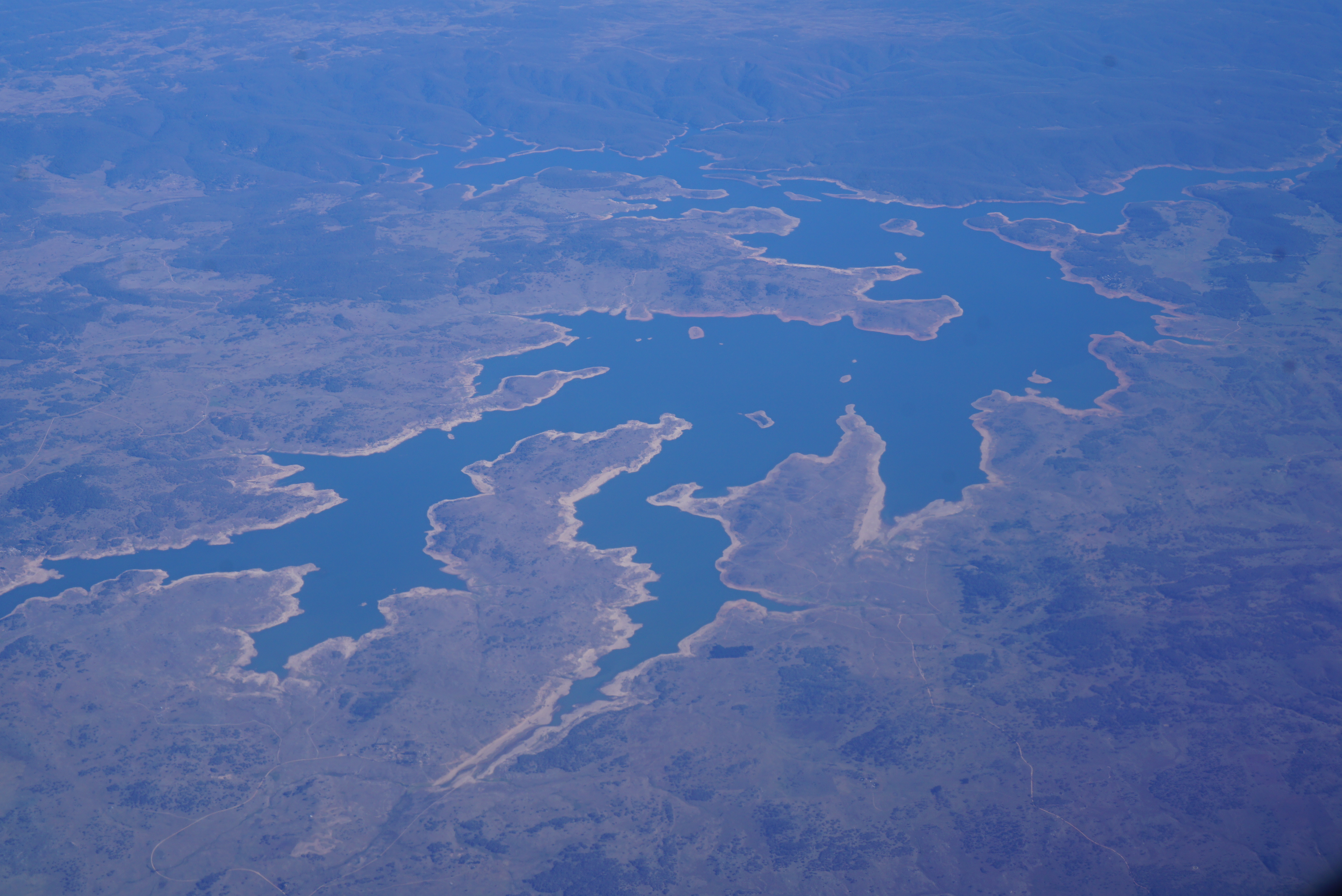
Lake Eucumbene from the air

=== Background ===
In the late 19th and early 20th centuries, the Murray and Murrumbidgee rivers were subject to development and control, to meet water supply and irrigation needs. By contrast, the Snowy River, that rose in the Australian Alps and flowed through mountainous and practically uninhabited country until debouching onto the river flats of East Gippsland, had never been controlled in any way, neither for the production of power nor for irrigation. A great proportion of its waters flowed eastwards into the South Pacific Ocean (the Tasman Sea). The Snowy River had the highest headwater source of any in Australia and drew away a large proportion of the waters from the south-eastern New South Wales snowfields. It was foreseen that construction works in the Snowy Mountains could supplement the flow of the great inland rivers, provide a means for developing hydro-electric power, and increase agricultural production in the Murray and Murrumbidgee valleys.

Following World War II, the Government of New South Wales proposed that the flow of the Snowy River be diverted into the Murrumbidgee River for irrigation and agricultural purposes. There was little emphasis placed on the generation of power. A counter proposal by the Government of Victoria involved a greater generation of power, and involved diversion of the Snowy River to the Murray River. Additionally, the Government of South Australia was concerned that downstream flows on the Murray River would be severely jeopardised.

The Commonwealth Government, looking at the national implications of the two proposals, initiated a meeting to discuss the use of the waters of the Snowy River, and a committee was set up in 1946 to examine the question on the broadest possible basis. This committee, in a report submitted in November 1948, suggested consideration of a far greater scheme than any previously put forward. It involved not only the simple question of use of the waters of the Snowy River, but consideration of the possible diversion of a number of rivers in the area, tributaries, not only of the Snowy, but of the Murray and Murrumbidgee. The recommendations of the committee were generally agreed to by a conference of Ministers representing the Commonwealth, New South Wales, and Victoria, and it was also agreed that the committee should continue its investigations.

However, limitations in the Australian Constitution meant that the Commonwealth Government was limited in the powers it could exercise, without the agreement of the States. Subsequently, the Commonwealth Government introduced legislation into the Federal Parliament under its defence power; and enacted the Snowy Mountains Hydro-Electric Power Act 1949 (Cth) that enabled the formation of the Snowy Mountains Hydroelectric Authority. Ten years later, the relevant states and territories introduced their own corresponding legislation and in January 1959 the Snowy Mountains Agreement was reached between the Commonwealth and the states.

The legislation created the Snowy Mountains Hydroelectric Authority to manage to scheme in 1949.

The chief engineer, New Zealand-born William Hudson (knighted 1955), was chosen to head the scheme as Chairman of the Snowy Mountains Hydroelectric Authority, and was instructed to seek workers from overseas. Hudson's employment of workers from 32 (mostly European) countries, many of whom had been at war with each other only a few years earlier, had a significant effect on the cultural mix of Australia.

=== Construction ===
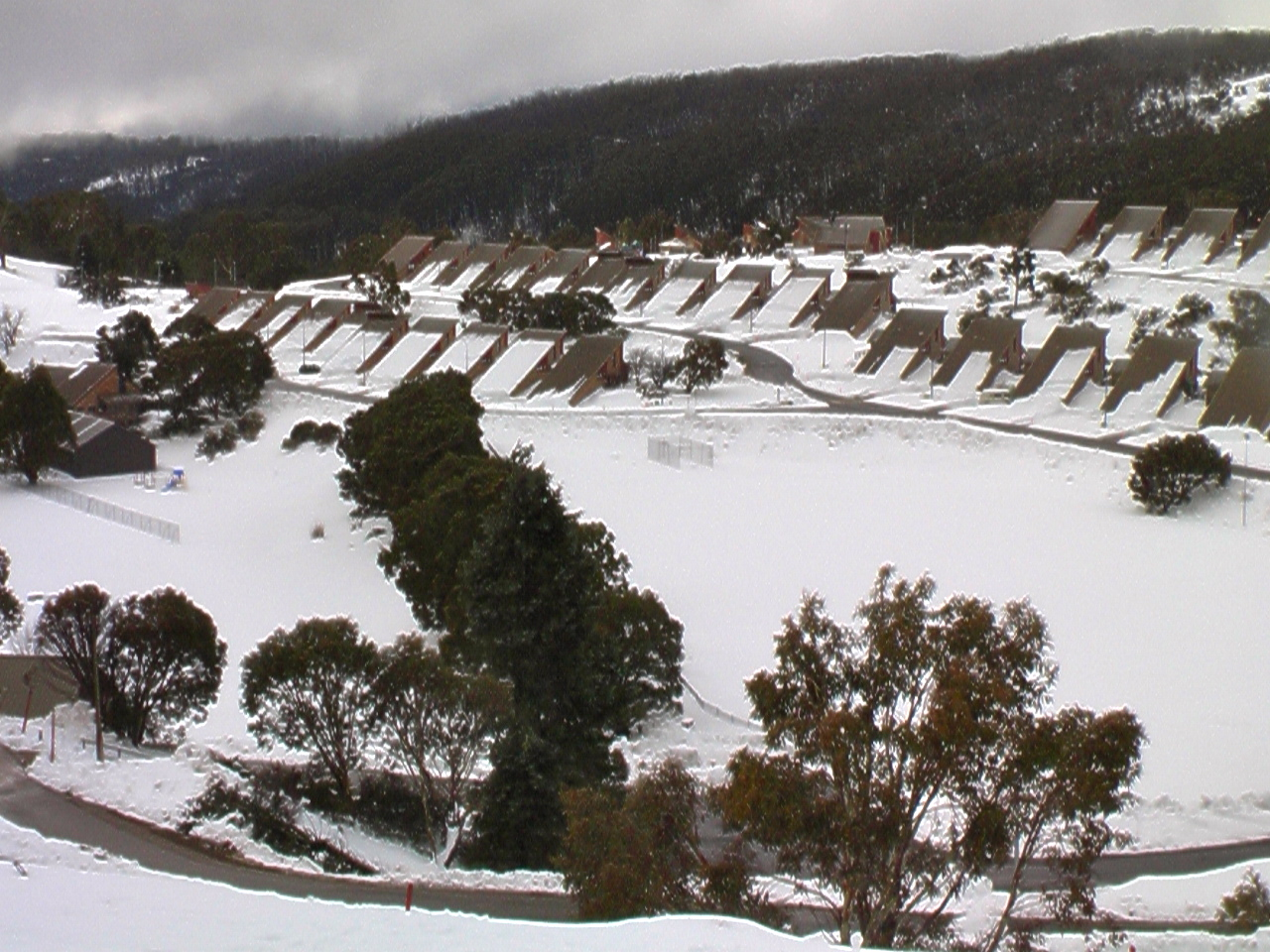
Cabramurra, Australia's highest town, is a Snowy Scheme company town.

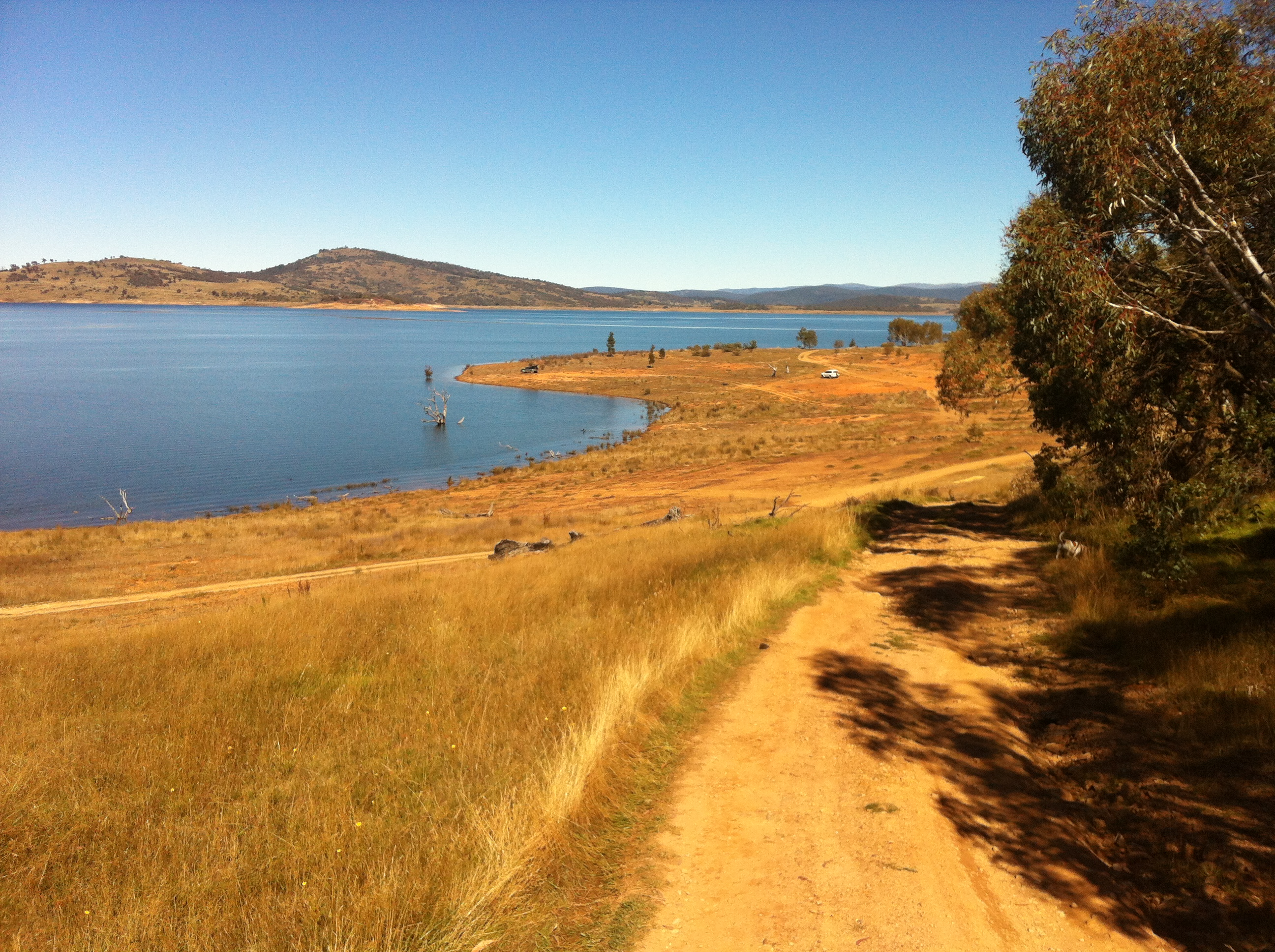
Lake Eucumbene flooded the township of Adaminaby. It is the largest reservoir in the Scheme, with a capacity some nine times that of Sydney Harbour.

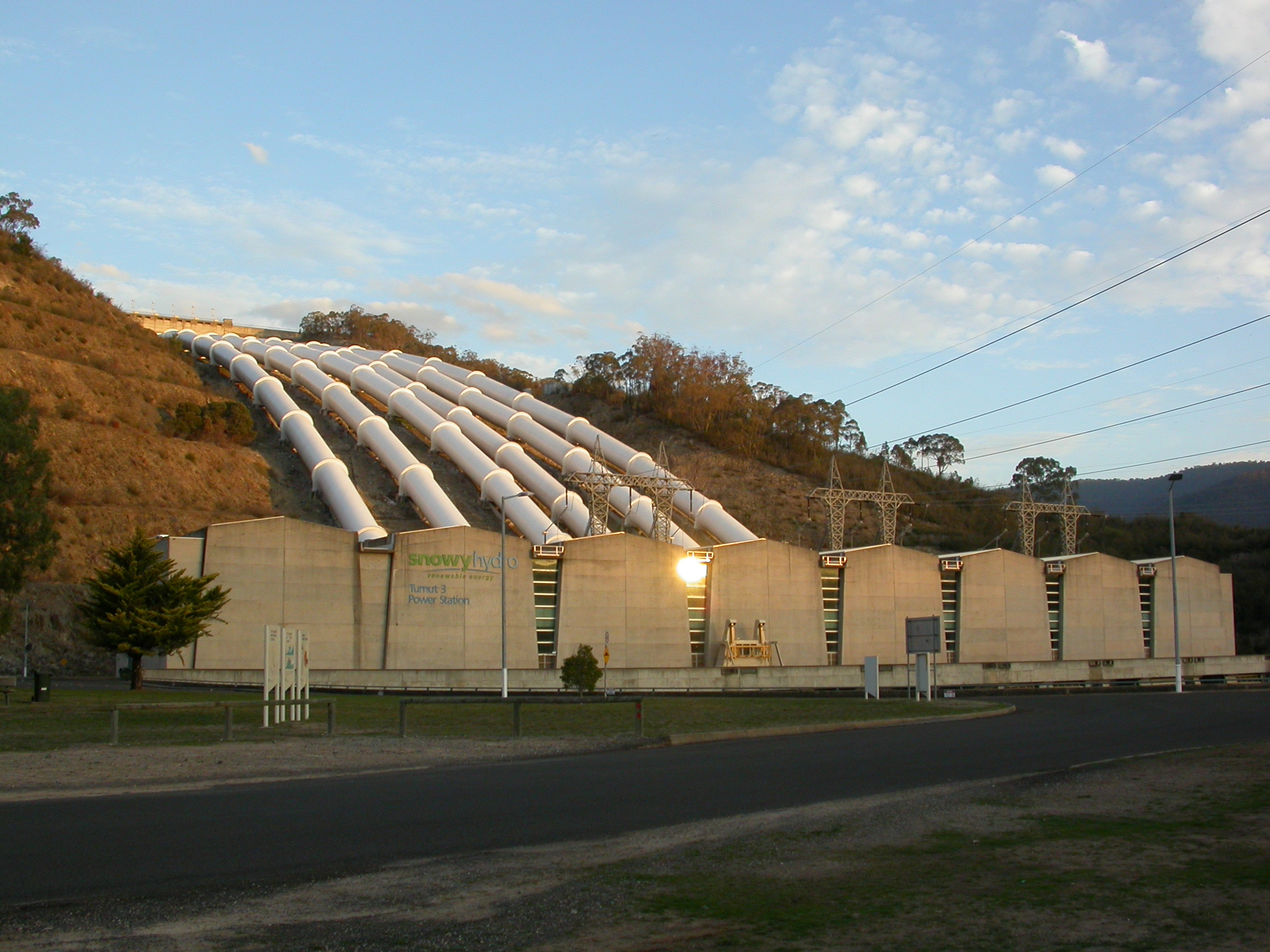
Tumut 3 generating station

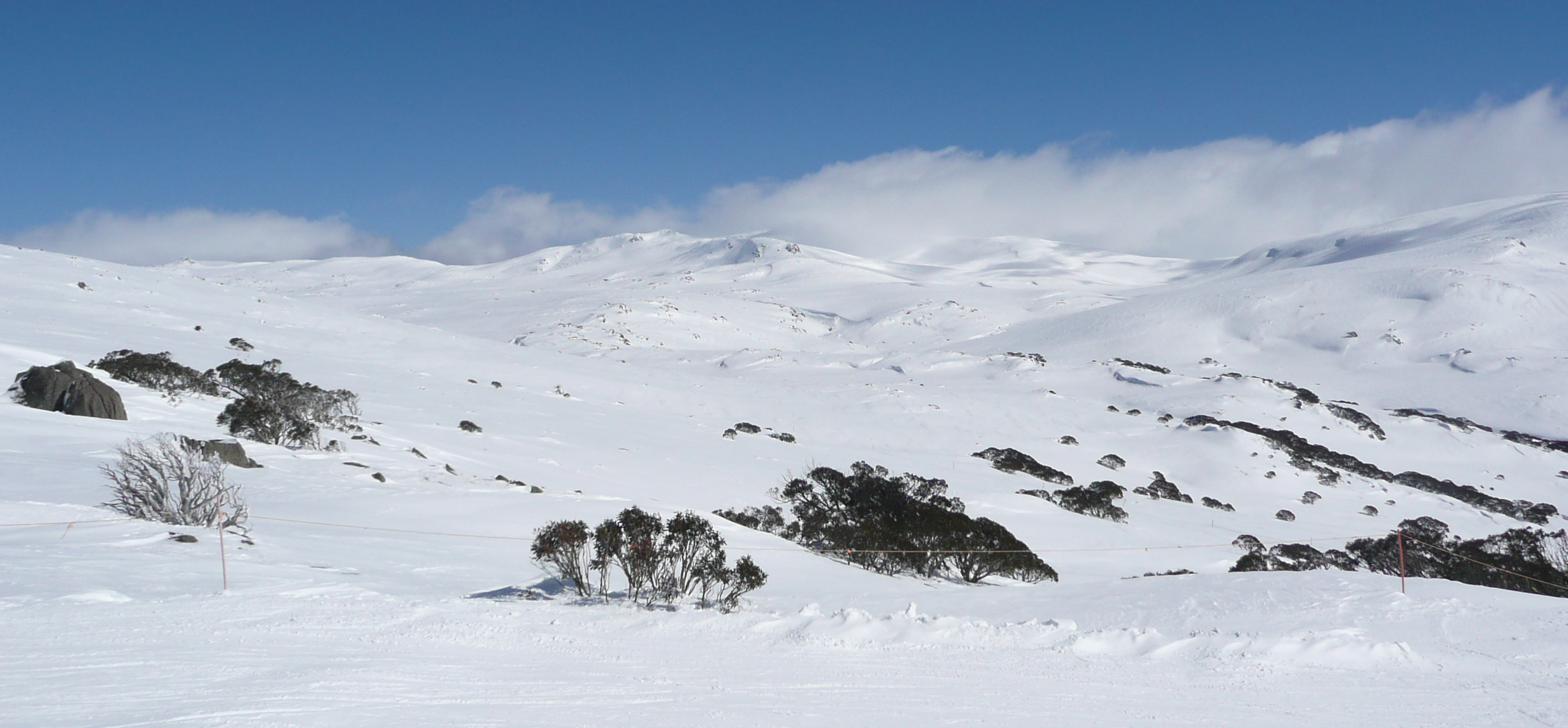
Mount Kosciuszko and the Main Range. Water from Snowy Mountains snow melt is used to generate electricity and divert water for irrigation.

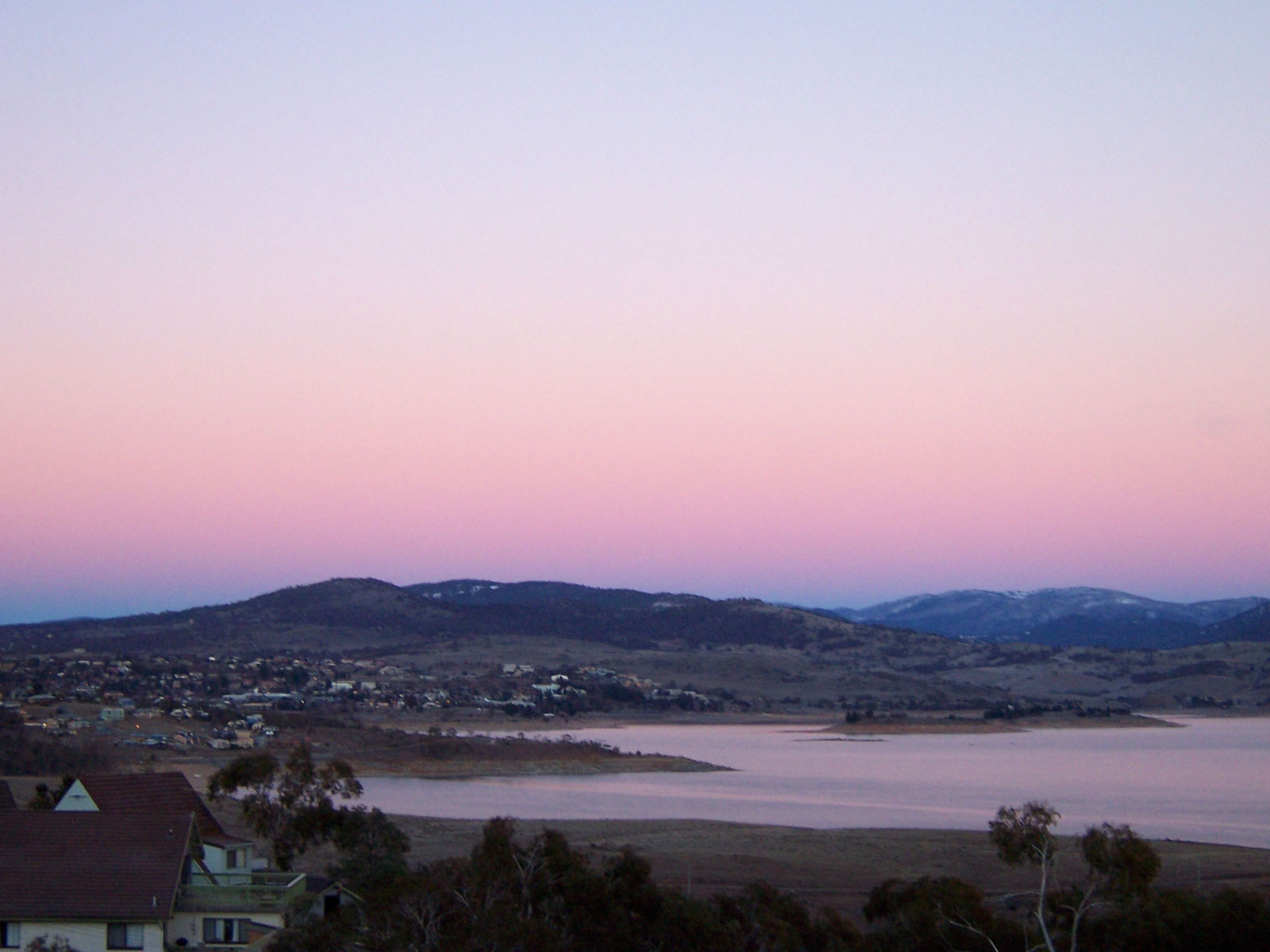
Jindabyne, as viewed from across Lake Jindabyne

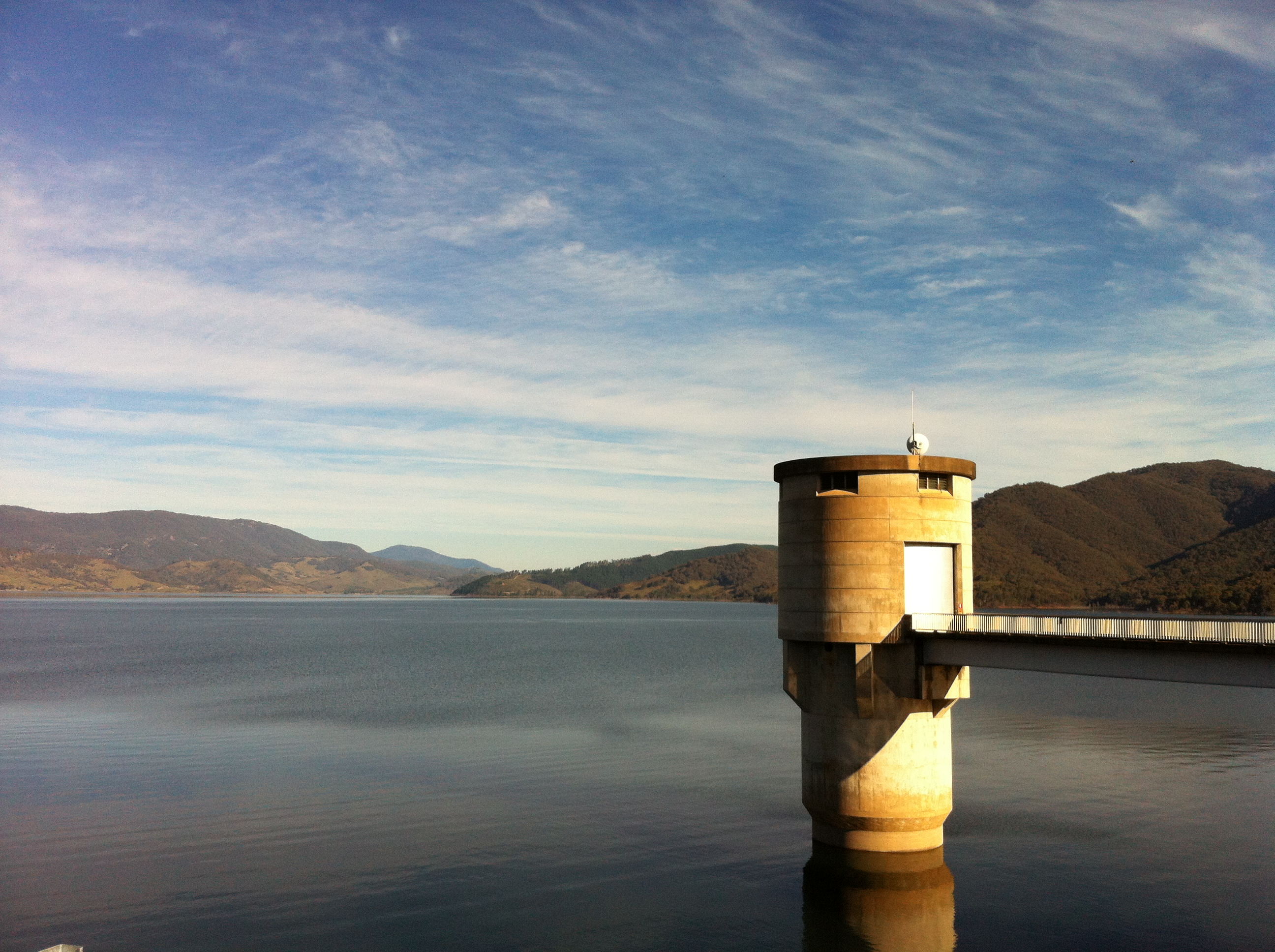
Blowering Dam

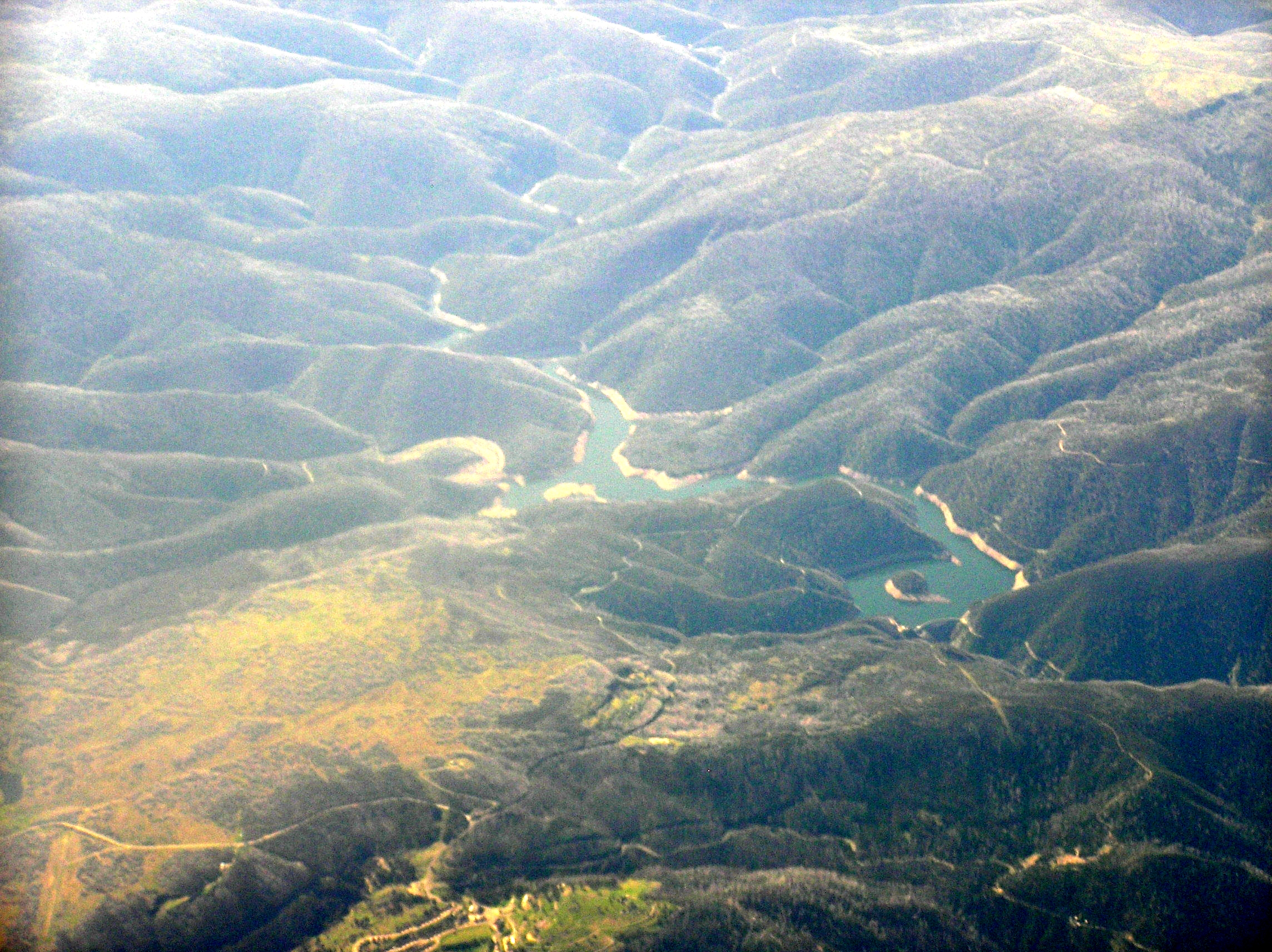
Aerial photo of Tumut Pond Reservoir and Dam, 2009

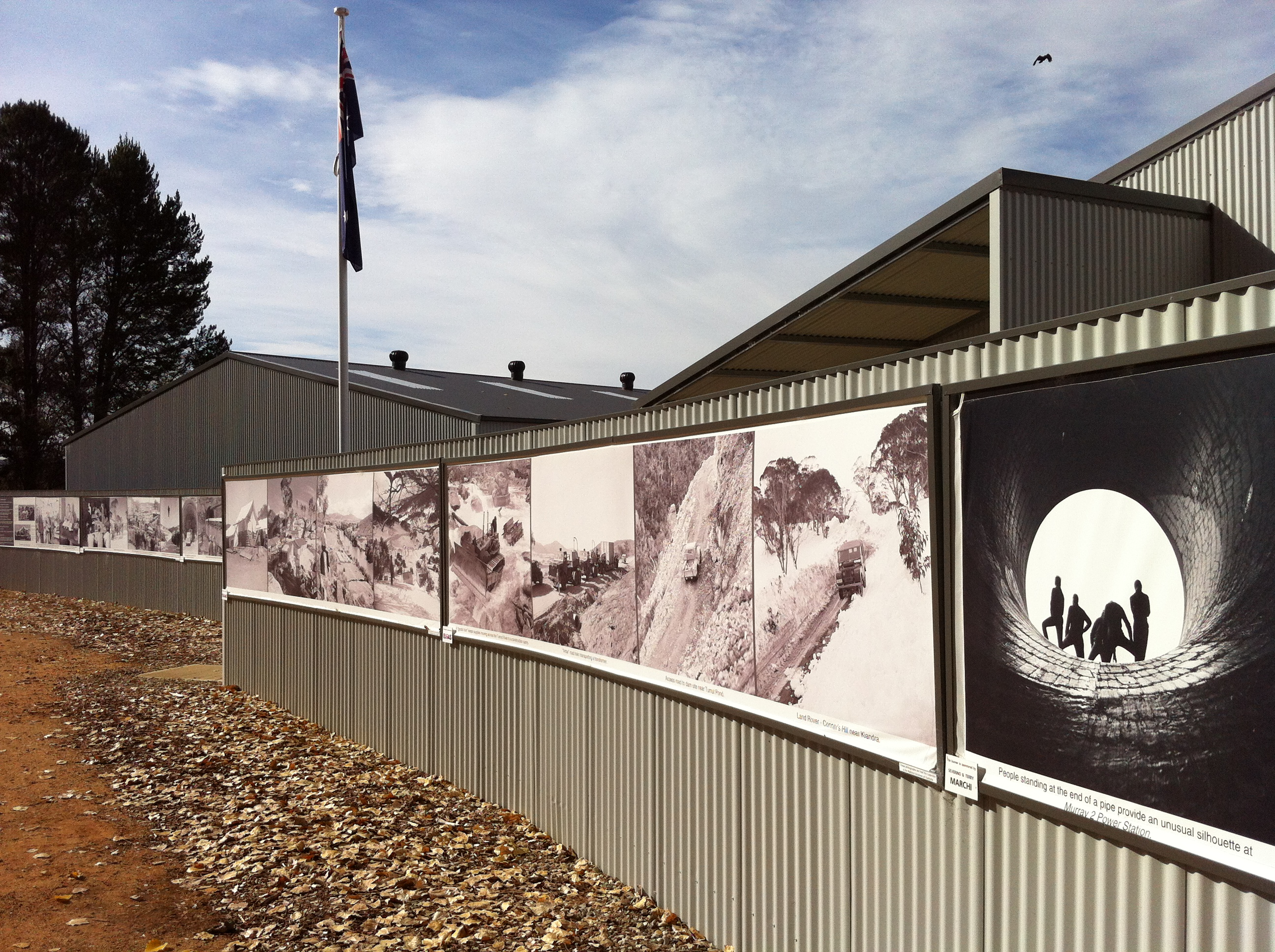
The Snowy Scheme Museum, in Adaminaby

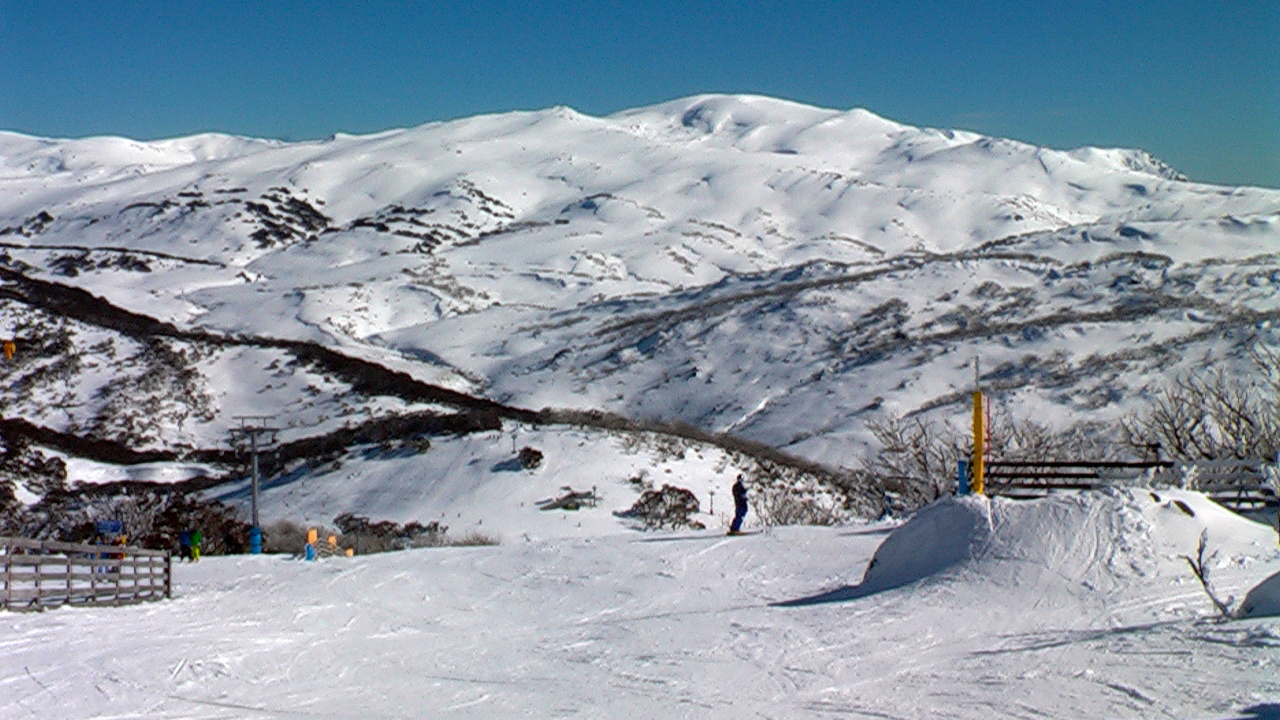
Guthega Ski Resort was built above Guthega Dam.

Construction of the Snowy Scheme was managed by the Snowy Mountains Hydroelectric Authority. It officially began on 17 October 1949 and took 25 years, being officially completed in 1974.

An agreement between the United States Bureau of Reclamation and Snowy Mountains Hydro to provide technical assistance and training of engineers was agreed between the United States and Australia in Washington, D.C., on 16 November 1951. A loan for $100 million was obtained from the World Bank in 1962.

Tunneling records were set in the construction of the Scheme and it was completed on time and on budget in 1974, at a cost of A$820 million; a dollar value equivalent in 1999 and 2004 to A$6 billion. Around two thirds of the workforce employed in the construction of the scheme were immigrant workers, originating from over thirty countries. The official death toll of workers on the Scheme stands at 121 people. Some 1,600 kilometres (990 mi) of roads and tracks were constructed, seven townships and over 100 camps were built to enable construction of the 16 major dams, seven hydroelectric power stations, two pumping stations, 145 kilometres (90 mi) of tunnel and 80 kilometres (50 mi) of pipelines and aqueducts. Just 2% of the construction work is visible from above ground.

Two of the towns constructed for the scheme are now permanent; Cabramurra, the highest town in Australia; and Khancoban. Cooma flourished during construction of the Scheme and remains the headquarters of the operating company of the Scheme. Townships at Adaminaby, Jindabyne and Talbingo were inundated by the flooded waters from Lake Eucumbene, Lake Jindabyne and Jounama Reservoir. Improved vehicular access to the high country enabled ski-resort villages to be constructed at Thredbo and Guthega in the 1950s by former Snowy Scheme workers who realised the potential for expansion of the Australian ski industry.

The Scheme is in an area of 5,124 square kilometres (1,978 sq mi), almost entirely within the Kosciuszko National Park. The design of the scheme was modelled on that of the Tennessee Valley Authority. Over 100,000 people from over 30 countries were employed during its construction, providing employment for many recently arrived immigrants, and was important in Australia's post-war economic and social development. Seventy percent of all the workers were migrants. During construction of the tunnels, a number of railways were employed to convey spoil from worksites and to deliver personnel, concrete and equipment throughout.

The project used Australia's first transistorised computer; one of the first in the world. Called 'Snowcom', the computer was used from 1960 to 1967.

At the completion of the project, the Australian Government maintained much of the diverse workforce and established the Snowy Mountains Engineering Corporation (SMEC), which is now an international engineering consultancy company. The Scheme is the largest renewable energy generator in mainland Australia and plays an important role in the operation of the National Electricity Market, generating approximately 67% of all renewable energy in the mainland National Electricity Market. The Snowy Scheme's primary function is as a water manager, however under the corporatised model must deliver dollar dividends to the three shareholder governments - the NSW, Commonwealth and Victorian Governments.

The Scheme also has a significant role in providing security of water flows to the Murray-Darling Basin. The Scheme provides approximately 2,100 gigalitres (7.4×10^{10} cu ft) of water a year to the Basin, providing additional water for an irrigated agriculture industry worth about A$3 bn per annum, representing more than 40% of the gross value of the nation's agricultural production.

The Snowy Mountains Hydro-electric Scheme, is one of the most complex integrated water and hydro-electric power schemes in the world and is listed as a "world-class civil engineering project" by the American Society of Civil Engineers. The scheme interlocks seven power stations and 16 major dams through 145 kilometres (90 mi) of trans-mountain tunnels and 80 kilometres (50 mi) of aqueducts. The history of the Snowy Scheme reveals its important role in building post World War II Australia.

Sir William Hudson was appointed the first commissioner of the Snowy Mountains Hydroelectric Authority, serving between 1949 and 1967. The Commissioner's role was the overall management of the Scheme. He represented the Scheme at the highest levels of government, welcomed international scientists and engineers, encouraged scientific and engineering research, as well as attending many social and civic activities. Sir William's management style 'stressed cooperation between management and labour and scientific knowledge (facts) over opinion'.

The Scheme was completed with the official opening of the Tumut 3 Power Station project by the Governor-General of Australia, Sir Paul Hasluck on 21 October 1972.

=== Safety ===
The scheme used a number of innovative approaches to many things during its construction. Notably, all vehicles driven on all parts of the scheme were required to be fitted with seatbelts for driver and front seat passenger; and that these seatbelts were required to be used.

On 16 April 1958, an elevator at Tumut 1 underground power station near Cabramurra fell about 400 feet when the cable broke, killing four Italian employees of a French construction firm.

The official death toll during construction was 121.

=== Personal stories and memoirs of work on the Snowy Scheme ===
Various stories and memoirs have been written about work on the Snowy Mountains Scheme. Siobhan McHugh's social history, The Snowy: The People Behind the Power is the most prominent, having been awarded the NSW Premier's Literary Award for Non-Fiction and being the source of an ABC radio documentary series (1987) and a Film Australia documentary, Snowy, A Dream of Growing Up (1989). Her book is based on about 90 oral histories with former Snowy workers and residents, with original recordings archived as a research collection at the State Library of New South Wales. An updated 70th anniversary edition of her book was published by New South in 2019 and its content showcased by Richard Fidler in an interview with McHugh for his popular ABC podcast, Conversations. Most recently, Snowy Hydro, Woden Community Service, Gen S Stories and PhotoAccess partnered for a Digital Storytelling project to present a diverse collection of stories told from the point of view of seven ex-workers, two lifelong employees and a child of a Snowy worker.

As part of the project, participants created short films about their experience on the Snowy Scheme, each story offering a unique perspective into what life was like building the Scheme between 1949 and 1974. The project's artistic director Jenni Savigny assisted participants to make the short films; enabling them to put together the scripts, record voice overs and edit the short films. In an interview with Andrew Brown (The Canberra Times), Savigny said it was important to create a history of the Snowy Hydro using the participant's own words, "You just get a personal sense of what it was like to be there, and what it meant to people's lives."

The films premiered 7 June 2018 at the Palace Electric Cinema in New Acton in Canberra and can be viewed on the Woden Community Service YouTube Channel.

=== Current operations ===
The Scheme is operated by Snowy Hydro Limited, an unlisted public company incorporated pursuant to the Corporations Act, 2001 (Cth), owned by the Australian Federal government.

There is currently further work ongoing for the expansion of the snowy scheme under the Snowy scheme 2.0 announced in 2017. Despite government support it has received many criticisms and concerns over the logistical and financial feasibility of the operation.

== Environmental concerns ==
The original plan was for 99% of the water of the Snowy River's natural flow to be diverted by the Scheme below Lake Jindabyne. Releases from the Scheme were based on the needs of riparian users only and took no account of the ecosystem's needs. It soon became clear that there were major environmental problems in the lower reaches of the Snowy River. An extensive public campaign led to the Snowy Water Inquiry being established in January 1998. The Inquiry reported to the New South Wales and Victorian Governments in October of that year, recommending an increase to 15% of natural flows. The two governments were equivocal about this target. Aside from economic considerations, there was a view that the health of the Murray was more important than that of the Snowy and that any extra environmental flows were better used there instead.

In the 1999 Victorian state election, the seat of Gippsland East was won by Craig Ingram, an independent and member of the Snowy River Alliance, based in large part on his campaign to improve Snowy flows. In 2000, Victoria and NSW agreed to a long-term target of 28%, requiring A$156 million of investment to offset losses to inland irrigators. In August 2002 flows were increased to 6%, with a target of 21% within 10 years. However, by October 2008 it was evident that the return of environmental flows to the Snowy River in 2009 would be no more than 4% of natural flow with governments arguing the Snowy River needs to "pay back" the "Mowamba Borrowings". At the 2010 state election, Ingram lost the seat of Gippsland East to the Nationals.

In 2017, it was announced that the 21% target would be reached for the first time.

Some concerned water managers, conservationists, politicians and farmers continue to advocate for the return of environmental flows to the Snowy River. The Snowy River Alliance formed in 1996 to address the lack of environmental flow commemorates Snowy River Day annually, towards the end of August, to mark the 2002 anniversary of when the governments of Victoria, NSW and the Commonwealth first released water into the Snowy River over the Mowamba Weir. The Dalgety District and Community Association started in response to dirty drinking water for the town of Dalgety, the loss of fishing and looming closure of the caravan park. A weir was constructed at Dalgety and the caravan park stayed as a result of their efforts. In accordance with the Snowy Water Licence, Snowy Hydro Limited has 're-commissioned' the Mowamba Aqueduct. Seasonal variable flows are essential to river ecology including flushing flows to support vital ecosystems for the Australian platypus and native Australian Bass, the species over which Ingram initially fought for flows into the Snowy River. A major spillway upgrade now facilitates these flows.

== Components ==
Construction of the Scheme began in 1949 and was completed in 1974. Guthega power station commenced power production on 21 February 1955.

=== Power stations ===
Hydro-electric power station	Installed capacity (MW)	HP (Thou)	Year completed
Guthega	60	80	1955
Tumut 1	330	440	1958
Tumut 2	286.4	384	1961
Blowering	80	110	1967
Murray 1	950	1,270	1967
Murray 2	550	740	1969
Tumut 3	1,800	2,210	1973
Tumut 3 Micro Hydro	0.72	0.97	2004
Jounama Small Hydro	14.4	19.3	2010
Jindabyne Dam Mini Hydro	1.1	1.5	2011

The total installed capacity is 4.073 gigawatts (5,462,000 hp).

=== Major dams and reservoirs ===
The Scheme's largest dam is Talbingo Dam with an embankment volume of 14 488 000 m^{3} and a wall height of 161.5 metres. Khancoban Dam is the longest dam in the scheme with a crest length of 1,067 metres (3,501 ft). A variety of dam and spillway types were used in the construction.

With a capacity of 4,798,400 megalitres (1,055.5×10^{9} imp gal; 1,267.6×10^{9} US gal), Lake Eucumbene is the largest reservoir in the Scheme. At the other end of the scale, Deep Creek Reservoir is the smallest reservoir with just 11 megalitres (2.4×10^{6} imp gal; 2.9×10^{6} US gal).

Dam constructed	Year completed	Impounded body of water	Reservoir capacity			Dam wall height	Crest length	Dam type	Spillway type
			ML	mill. imp gal	mill. US gal				
Blowering Dam	1968	Blowering Reservoir	1,628,000	358,000	430,000	112 m (367 ft)	747 m (2,451 ft)	Rockfill embankment	Concrete chute
Deep Creek Dam	1961	Deep Creek Reservoir	11	2.4	2.9	21 m (69 ft)	55 m (180 ft)	Concrete gravity	Uncontrolled
Eucumbene Dam	1958	Lake Eucumbene	4,798,400	1,055,000	1,267,600	116 m (381 ft)	579 m (1,900 ft)	Earthfill embankment	Overflow ski-jump and bucket
Geehi Dam	1966	Geehi Reservoir	21,093	4,640	5,572	91 m (299 ft)	265 m (869 ft)	Rockfill embankment	Bell Mouth
Guthega Dam	1955	Guthega Reservoir	1,604	353	424	34 m (112 ft)	139 m (456 ft)	Concrete gravity	Uncontrolled
Happy Jacks Dam	1959	Happy Jacks Pondage	271	60	72	29 m (95 ft)	76 m (249 ft)	Concrete gravity	Uncontrolled
Island Bend Dam	1965	Island Bend Pondage	3,084	678	815	49 m (161 ft)	146 m (479 ft)	Concrete gravity	Controlled
Jindabyne Dam	1967	Lake Jindabyne	688,287	151,402	181,826	72 m (236 ft)	335 m (1,099 ft)	Rockfill embankment	Controlled
Jounama Dam	1968	Jounama Pondage	43,542	9,578	11,503	44 m (144 ft)	518 m (1,699 ft)	Rockfill embankment	Controlled
Khancoban Dam	1966	Khancoban Reservoir	26,643	5,861	7,038	18 m (59 ft)	1,067 m (3,501 ft)	Earthfill embankment	Controlled
Murray Two Dam	1968	Murray Two Pondage	2,344	516	619	43 m (141 ft)	131 m (430 ft)	Concrete arch	Controlled
Talbingo Dam	1970	Talbingo Reservoir	921,400	202,700	243,400	162 m (531 ft)	701 m (2,300 ft)	Rockfill embankment	Concrete chute
Tantangara Dam	1960	Tantangara Reservoir	254,099	55,894	67,126	45 m (148 ft)	216 m (709 ft)	Concrete gravity	Concrete chute
Tooma Dam	1961	Tooma Reservoir	28,124	6,186	7,430	67 m (220 ft)	305 m (1,001 ft)	Concrete embankment	Concrete Chute
Tumut Pond Dam	1959	Tumut Pond Reservoir	52,793	11,613	13,946	86 m (282 ft)	218 m (715 ft)	Concrete arch	Controlled
Tumut Two Dam	1961	Tumut Two Pondage	2,677	589	707	46 m (151 ft)	119 m (390 ft)	Concrete gravity	Controlled

=== Tunnels ===
Tunnel	Length (km)	Percentage Lined	Capacity (m^{3}/s)	Section	Year Completed
Murrumbidgee-Eucumbene	16.6	17.7%	17	Horseshoe	1961
Eucumbene-Tumut	22.2	28.3%	113.2	Circular	1959
Tooma-Tumut	14.3	20%	38.5	Combination	1961
Tumut 1 Pressure	2.4	100%	124.6	Circular	1959
Tumut 1 Tailwater	1.3	54.5%	124.6	Horseshoe	1959
Tumut 2 Pressure	4.8	100%	124.6	Circular	1961
Tumut 2 Tailwater	6.4	100%	124.6	Circular	1961
Guthega Pressure	4.6	11.6%	34	Horseshoe	1955
Eucumbene-Snowy	23.5	19.7%	96.3	Horseshoe	1965
Jindabyne-Island Bend	9.8	10.6%	25.5	Combination	1968
Snowy-Geehi	14.5	13.3%	113.2-147.2	Horseshoe	1966
Murray 1 Pressure	12		189.2		
Murray 2 Pressure	2.4	100%	243.5	Horseshoe	1969

=== Pumping stations ===
The Snowy Mountains Scheme has two pumping stations. The 600 MW pump storage facility at Tumut 3 Power Station returns water to Talbingo Reservoir. The 62 MW Jindabyne Pumping Station pumps water from Lake Jindabyne through to the Snowy-Geehi Tunnel at Island Bend.

==== Expansion plans ====
In March 2017, the Australian government then headed by Malcolm Turnbull suggested a $2 billion project expanding the 4.1 GW Snowy Mountains Scheme by 2 GW of pump storage for a week, building new tunnels and power stations, but no new dams. The 80% efficiency of such storage can be sufficient in leveling differences between supply and demand. Dubbed Snowy 2.0, the expansion has been under construction since 2019 and was expected to be complete by 2026. Delays have meant the project will not be fully operational until 2029.

== Tourism ==
The Snowy Scheme is a major tourist destination. Sightseeing driving tours to the key locations of the Scheme are popular out of regional centres like Cooma, Adaminaby and Jindabyne along roads built for the Scheme like the Snowy Mountains Highway and Alpine Way and towards sights like Cabramurra, as Australia's highest town, spectacular dam walls, and scenic lakes. Trout fishing is popular in the lakes of the Scheme, notably Lake Jindabyne and Lake Eucumbene.

The Snowy Scheme Museum opened at Adaminaby in 2011 to profile the history of the Scheme.

Though skiing in Australia began in the northern Snowy Mountains in the 1860s, it was the construction of the vast Snowy Scheme from 1949, with its improvements to infrastructure and influx of experienced European skiers among the workers on the Scheme, that really opened up the mountains for the large scale development of a ski industry, and led to the establishment of Thredbo and Perisher as leading Australian resorts. The construction of Guthega Dam brought skiers to the isolated Guthega district and a rope tow was installed there in 1957. Charles Anton, a snowy worker identified the potential of the Thredbo Valley.

== Engineering heritage award ==
The scheme is listed as a National Engineering Landmark by Engineers Australia as part of its Engineering Heritage Recognition Program.

== See also ==
- Snowy A 1990s TV series starring Rebecca Gibney set in the scheme.
- Bradfield Scheme, a similar proposal for Queensland
- Economic history of Australia
- National Electricity Market
- Kiewa Hydroelectric Scheme
