= Tumut Pond Dam =

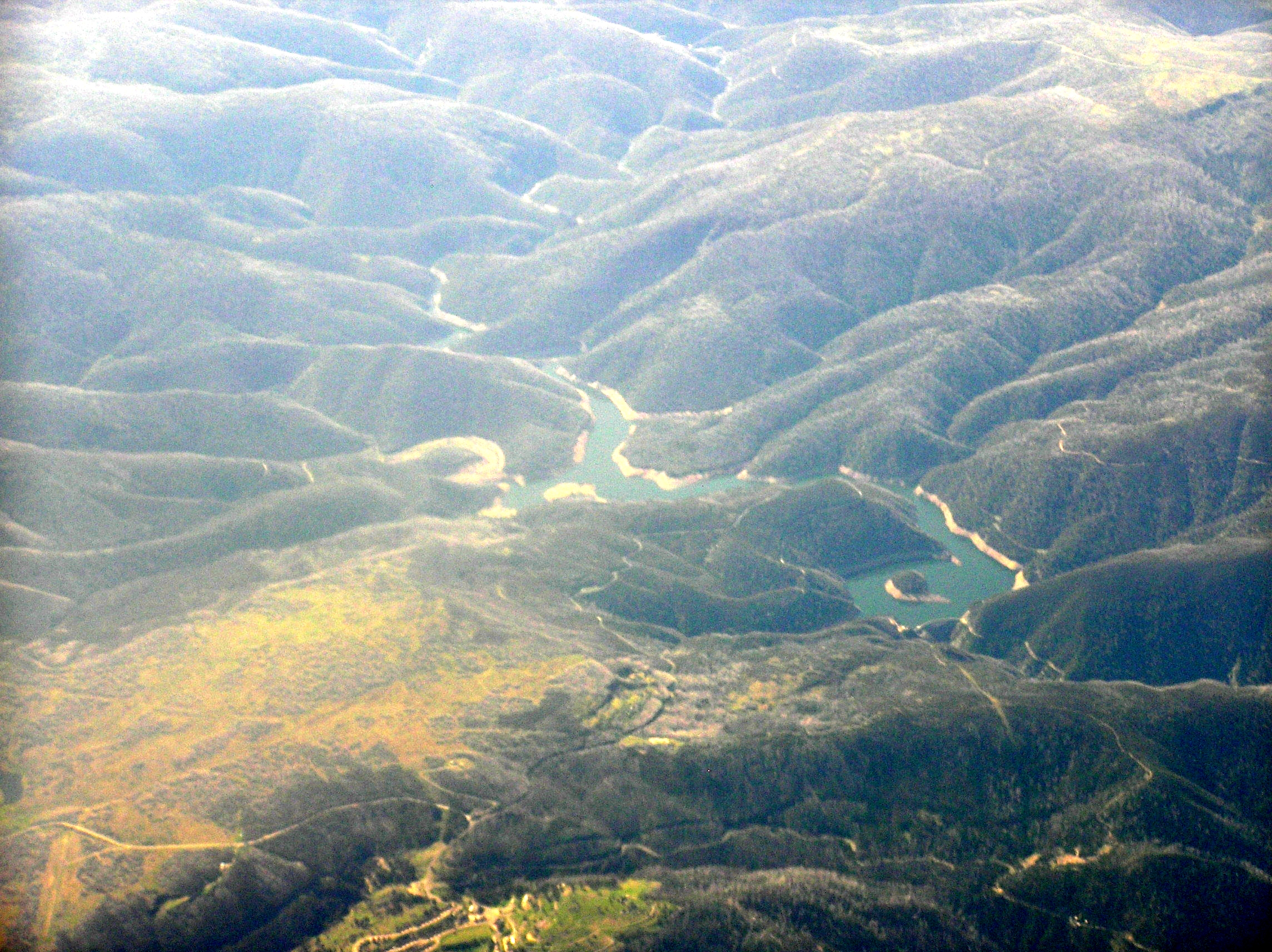
- An aerial photo of Tumut Pondage and dam, 2009.

- Location of Tumut Pond Dam in New South Wales
- Country: Australia
- Location: Snowy Mountains, New South Wales
- Coordinates: 35°37′54″S 148°23′24″E
- Purpose: Hydro-power, diversion, irrigation
- Status: Operational
- Opening date: 1959
- Owner: Snowy Hydro

Dam and spillways
- Type of dam: Arch dam
- Impounds: Tumut River
- Height: 86.3 m (283 ft)
- Length: 218 m (715 ft)
- Dam volume: 141,000 m^{3} (5,000,000 cu ft)
- Spillway capacity: 1,926 m^{3}/s (68,000 cu ft/s)

Reservoir
- Creates: Tumut Pond Reservoir
- Total capacity: 52,793 ML (1,864.4×10^{6} cu ft)
- Catchment area: 332 km^{2} (128 sq mi)
- Surface area: 202.7 ha (501 acres)

Power Station
- Operator: Snowy Hydro
- Commission date: 1959
- Type: Conventional
- Hydraulic head: 292.6 m (960 ft)
- Turbines: 4
- Installed capacity: 330 MW (440,000 hp)
- Annual generation: 847 GWh (3,050 TJ)

Tumut Pond Dam (/ˈtjuːmət/) is a major gated concrete arch dam across the upper reaches of the Tumut River in the Snowy Mountains of New South Wales, Australia. The dam's main purpose is for the generation of hydro-power and is one of the sixteen major dams that comprise the Snowy Mountains Scheme, a vast hydroelectricity and irrigation complex constructed in south-east Australia between 1949 and 1974 and now run by Snowy Hydro.

The impounded reservoir is called the Tumut Pond Reservoir, or less formally, the Tumut Pondage.

== Location and features ==
Completed in 1959, Tumut Pond Dam is a major dam, located approximately 3 kilometres (1.9 mi) south-east of Cabramurra. The dam was constructed by a consortium comprising Kaiser-Walsh-Perini-Raymond based on engineering plans developed by the United States Bureau of Reclamation under contract from the Snowy Mountains Hydroelectric Authority.

The dam wall comprising 141,000 cubic metres (5,000,000 cu ft) of concrete is 86 metres (282 ft) high and 218 metres (715 ft) long. At 100% capacity the dam wall holds back 52,793 megalitres (1,864.4×10^{6} cu ft) of water. The surface area of Tumut Pond Reservoir is 202.7 hectares (501 acres) and the catchment area is 332 square kilometres (128 sq mi). The gated spillway is capable of discharging 1,926 cubic metres per second (68,000 cu ft/s) through two 14.3 m (47 ft) wide by 9.1 m (30 ft) high radial gates.

The crest of the dam wall forms part of the road between Cabramurra and Khancoban. The road is closed to through traffic in winter as it is not routinely cleared of snow and ice.

=== Power generation ===
Downstream of the dam wall and located underground is Tumut 1, a conventional hydroelectric power station, that has four turbine generators, with a generating capacity of 330 megawatts (440,000 hp) of electricity; and a net generation of 847 gigawatt-hours (3,050 TJ) per annum. The power station has 262.1 metres (860 ft) rated hydraulic head. The underground powerhouse is located 366 metres (1,201 ft) below ground level.

=== Tumut Pond Reservoir ===
Tumut Pond Reservoir or Tumut Pond Pondage (sometimes also Tumut 1 Reservoir/Tumut 1 Pondage) is formed by the Tumut Pond Dam. Snowmelt and other runoff enter the reservoir from the upper Tumut River and the dam impounds the river's natural flow below the Tumut Two Dam wall.

Water from the reservoir, after passing over the spillway of the Tumut Pond Dam, flows downstream, above the underground Tumut 1 Power Station, and into the impounded waters of Talbingo Reservoir, formed by the Talbingo Dam; past Tumut 3 Power Station, into Jounama Pondage, formed by Jounama Dam; and then into Blowering Reservoir, formed by Blowering Dam, passing through Blowering Power Stations. The natural flow of the Tumut River continues into the Riverina region.

== See also ==
- List of dams and reservoirs in New South Wales
- Snowy Hydro Limited
- Snowy Mountains Scheme
- Tumut Hydroelectric Power Station
