= Tumut Hydroelectric Power Station =

Power stations in New South Wales, Australia

Tumut Hydroelectric Power Stations
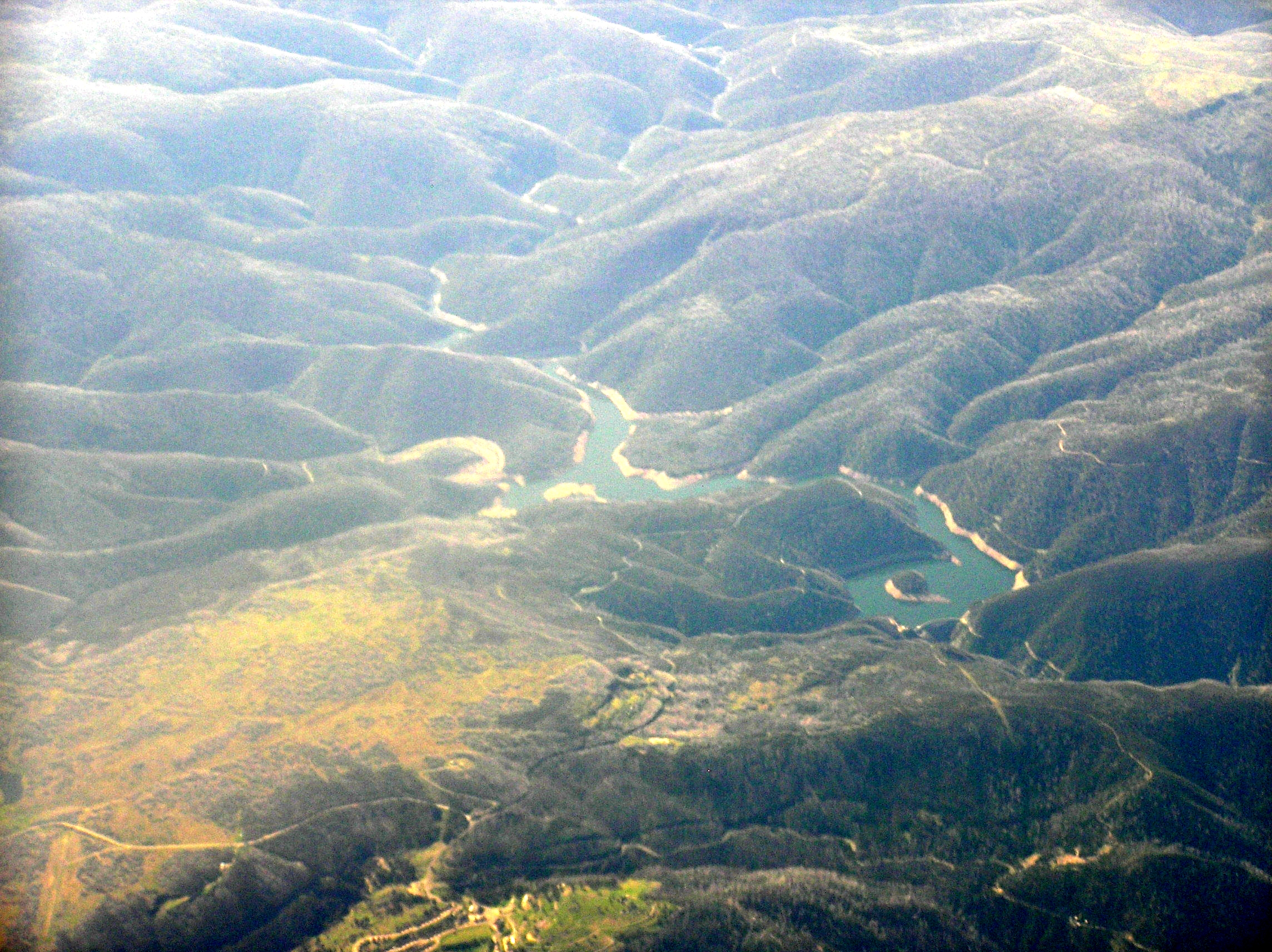
- An aerial photo of Tumut Pondage and dam, 2009.
- Interactive map of Tumut Hydroelectric Power Stations
- Country: Australia
- Location: Snowy Mountains Scheme, New South Wales
- Purpose: Power
- Status: Operational
- Opening date: 1959
- Owner: Snowy Hydro

Reservoir
- Creates: Tumut Pond Reservoir
- Total capacity: 52,793 ML (42,800 acre⋅ft)
- Catchment area: 332 km^{2} (128 sq mi)
- Surface area: 202.7 ha (501 acres)

Tumut 1 Power Station
- Coordinates: 35°57′08.1″S 148°22′02.9″E
- Operator: Snowy Hydro
- Commission date: 1959
- Type: Conventional
- Hydraulic head: 292.6 m (960 ft)
- Turbines: 4
- Installed capacity: 330 MW (440,000 hp)
- Annual generation: 847 GWh (3,050 TJ)
- Tumut 2 Power Station
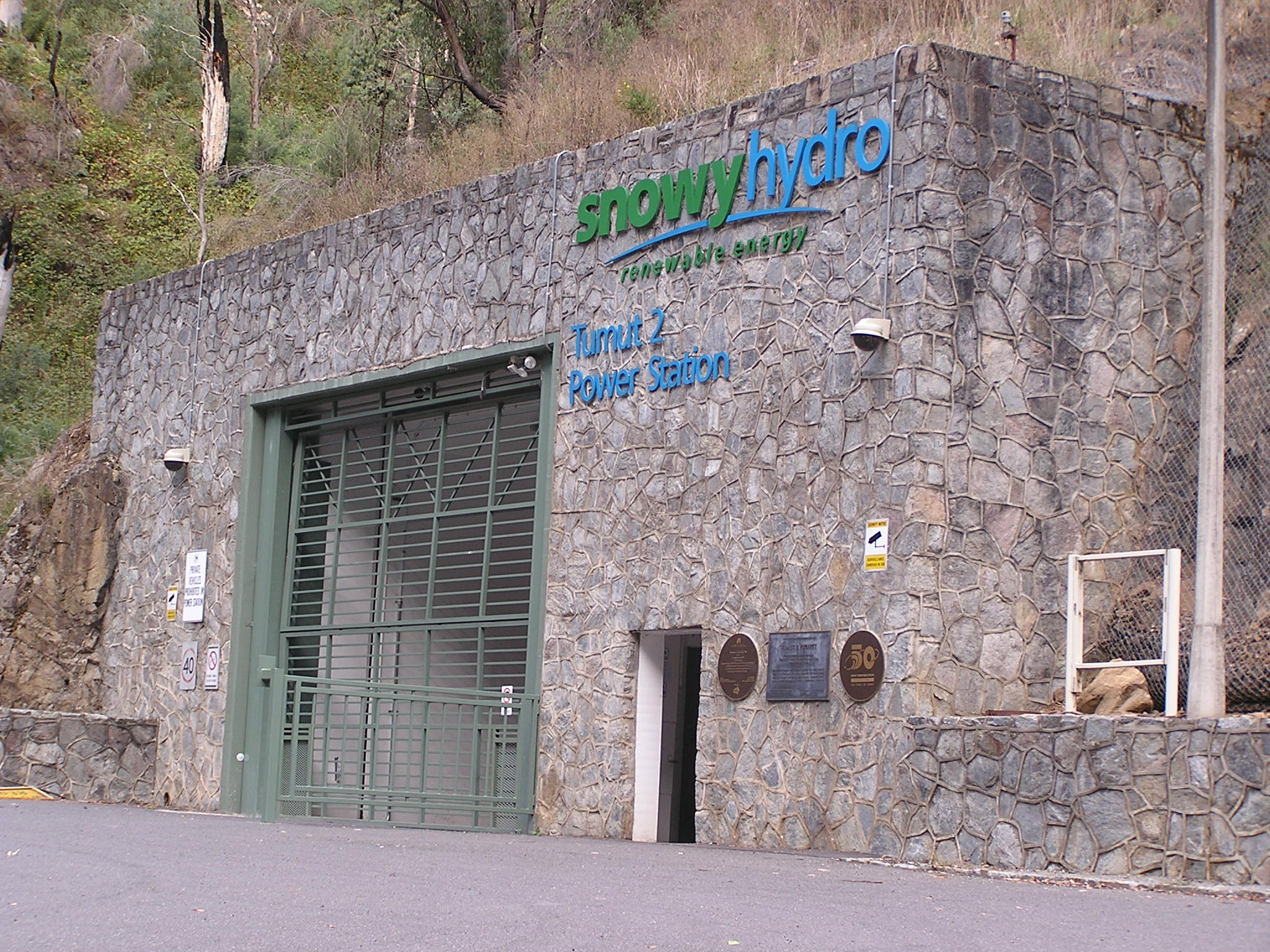
- Service entrance to the Tumut 2 Power Station
- Interactive map of Tumut 2 Power Station

Tumut 2 Power Station
- Coordinates: 35°52′56.6″S 148°22′12.6″E
- Operator: Snowy Hydro
- Commission date: 1962
- Type: Conventional
- Installed capacity: 286.4 MW (384,100 hp)
- Tumut 3 Power Station
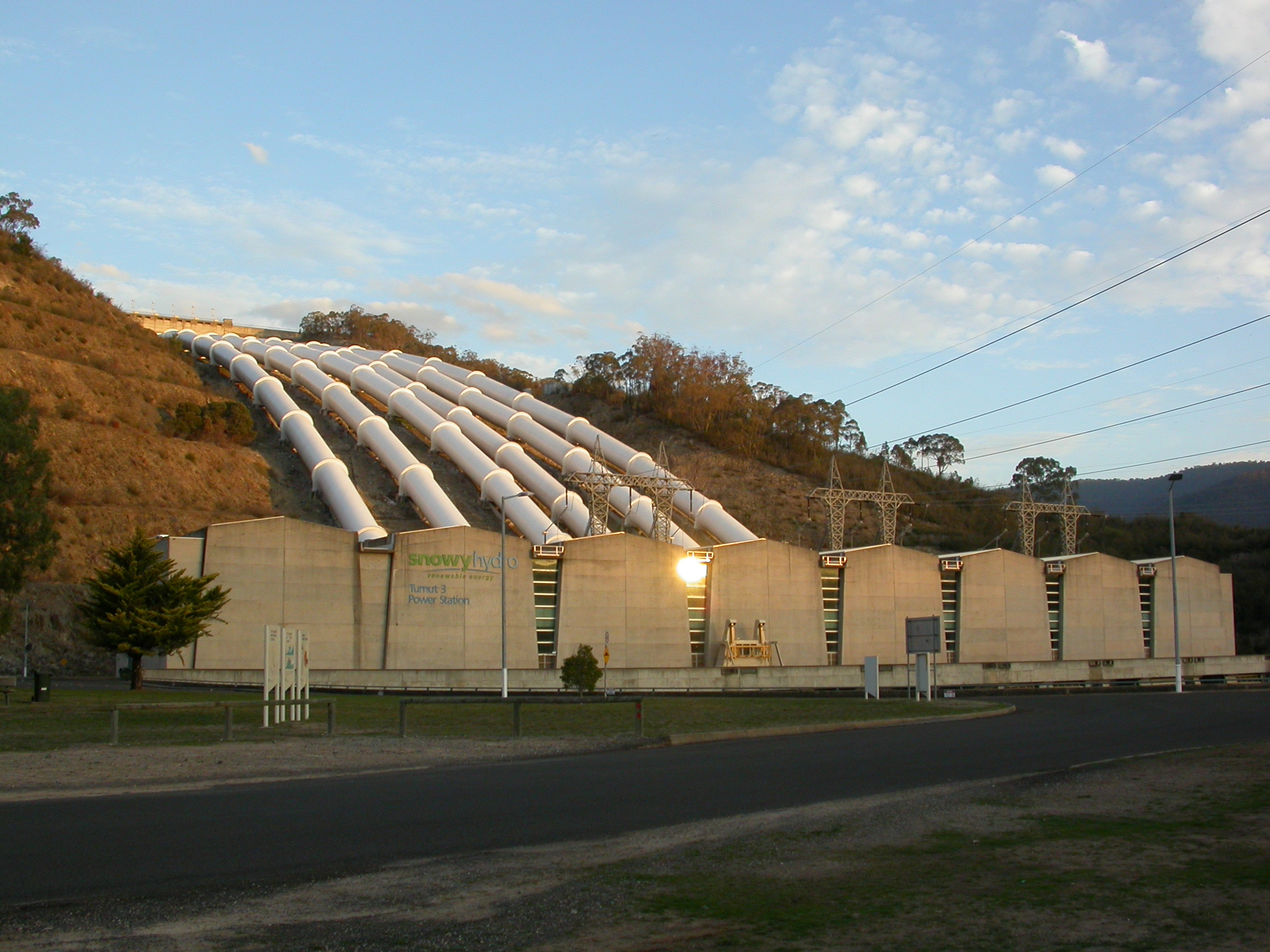
- Tumut 3 Power Station
- Interactive map of Tumut 3 Power Station

Upper reservoir
- Creates: Talbingo Reservoir
- Total capacity: 921,400 ML (747,000 acre⋅ft)

Lower reservoir
- Creates: Jounama Pondage
- Total capacity: 43,500 ML (35,300 acre⋅ft)

Tumut 3 Power Station
- Coordinates: 35°36′40″S 148°17′29″E
- Operator: Snowy Hydro
- Commission date: 1973
- Type: Pumped-storage
- Hydraulic head: 150.9 m (495 ft)
- Turbines: 6
- Pump-generators: 3
- Pumps: 600 MW (800,000 hp)
- Installed capacity: 1,800 MW (2,400,000 hp)
- Website; Tumut 3 Power Station at www.snowyhydro.com.au

The Tumut Hydroelectric Power Stations (/ˈtjuːmət/) is a series of three hydroelectric power stations on the Tumut River in New South Wales, Australia, that are part of the Snowy Mountains Scheme. The Tumut stations comprises two conventional and one pumped storage power stations.

The generating assets of the three Tumut power stations are owned by Snowy Hydro Limited, a company whose shareholders include the governments of Australia. The company is also licensed to manage the water rights used by the power stations.

== Stations ==
=== Tumut 1 Underground Power Station ===
Located downstream of Tumut Pond Dam and 366 metres (1,201 ft) below ground level, Tumut 1 Power Station is situated approximately 2.25 kilometres (1.40 mi) south-west from Cabramurra, under Happy Valley Road. (Note: A lift and ventilation shaft is located adjacent to Happy Valley Road.)

The conventional hydroelectric power station has four turbine generators, with a combined generating capacity of 330 megawatts (440,000 hp) of electricity; and a net generation of 847 gigawatt-hours (3,050 TJ) per annum. The power station was completed in 1959, and has 292.6 metres (960 ft) rated head.

The first 330 kV transmission lines were commissioned in New South Wales at the Tumut 1 Power Station during the 1950s. These cables were manufactured in England and linked to the underground transformers at Tumut 1, and connected with the transmission line. The lines carried power to Sydney where new sub-stations were established, to handle the upgrade from 132 kV transmission lines. This innovative plan, which faced significant scepticism initially, was considered to be at the forefront of technology which challenged designers and overseas manufacturers. Extra high voltage was in its infancy in the early 1950s. The lines were subject to a 1000 kV test on the cables prior to them going into service. These cables and the transmission system have been in service for over 50 years.

The original transformer at Tumut 1 weighed 81.2 tonnes (89.5 short tons); and each assembled generator rotor is in excess of 203 tonnes (224 short tons) necessitating delivery in component pieces and assembly on site.

The station is connected to the National Electricity Market via the 330 kV Upper Tumut Switching Station, 2.75 kilometres (1.71 mi) North of Cabramurra.

The Upper Tumut Works is sometimes used as a colloquial term to refer to both Tumut 1 and Tumut 2 Underground Power Stations as well as their respective dams, tunnels and the Upper Tumut Switching Station.

=== Tumut 2 Underground Power Station ===
Tumut 2 Power Station is situated approximately 5.91 kilometres (3.67 mi) north of north-west from Cabramurra, under Goat Ridge Rd, some 244 metres (801 ft) below ground level.
The conventional hydroelectric power station has four Francis turbine generators, with a combined generating capacity of 286.4 megawatts (384,100 hp) and a net generation of 787 gigawatt-hours (2,830 TJ) per annum. The power station was completed in 1962, and has 262.1 metres (860 ft) rated head. Water flows through the turbines at the rate of 118.9 cubic metres per second (4,200 cu ft/s).

The conventional gravity-fed hydroelectric power station is fed by water held in Tumut Two Pondage and from water discharged from Tumut 1 Power Station.

The station is connected to the National Electricity Market via the 330 kV Upper Tumut Switching Station, 2.75 kilometres (1.71 mi) North of Cabramurra.

=== Tumut 3 Power Station ===
Tumut 3 Power Station is the first major pumped storage hydroelectric power station in Australia. Pump-storage schemes use off-peak energy to pump water to a reservoir on a higher level. This water then passes through turbines to generate electricity when prices are higher. The sole powerhouse is located above ground, below Talbingo Dam.

The power station is fitted with six Toshiba turbines, each equipped with Melco-manufactured generators, has a combined generating capacity of 1,800 megawatts (2,400,000 hp) of electricity. Three of the six units can operate as pumps at a combined rate of 600 MW. The design for the power station was managed by Peter Hughes AM. It was completed in 1973, upgraded in 2012 and has 150.9 metres (495 ft) rated head. Water is carried in six penstocks, each 488 metres (1,601 ft) long and 5.6 metres (18 ft) in diameter, delivering water both from and to Talbingo Reservoir. The 3 pumps draw water from Jounama Pondage at the combined rate of 297 cubic metres per second (10,500 cu ft/s), returning water to Talbingo Reservoir for later generation use in periods of peak-demand, usually within the same month.

During 2003, Snowy Hydro commissioned six 150 kilowatts (200 hp) micro-hydro generators on the existing cooling water systems on each of the six generating units at Tumut 3 Power Station. These GreenPower accredited units enable Snowy Hydro to save approximately 3,137 tonnes (3,458 short tons) of carbon dioxide per annum. In addition, this installation not only captures previous wasted renewable energy, but also will be substantially reducing the noise that was associated with the previous pressure reducing valves on the six generating unit's cooling systems. Between 2009 and December 2011, there was a major upgrade of Tumut 3, adding additional capacity in the range of 25 megawatts (34,000 hp) to 50 megawatts (67,000 hp) per unit.

The station is connected to the National Electricity Market via the 330 kV Lower Tumut Switching Station, 500m North West of Tumut 3 or 3.0 km south of south-west from Talbingo. A 450 MW / 1,800 megawatt-hour grid battery is proposed for the switching station.

== See also ==
External image
- Tumut 3 generation and pumping statistics, by Open Electricity

- List of power stations in New South Wales
- List of dams and reservoirs in New South Wales
