= Talbingo Dam =

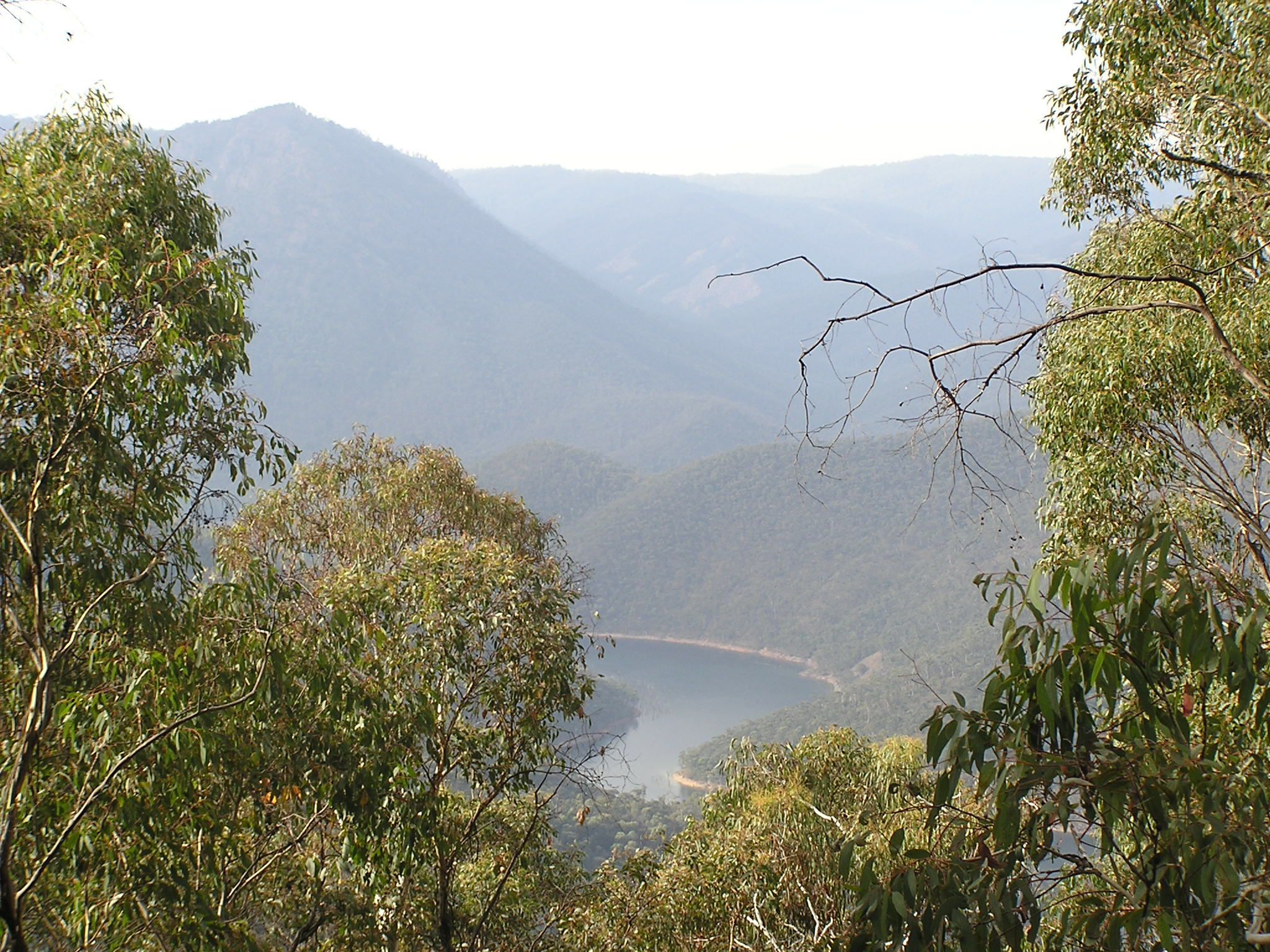
- Talbingo Dam in 2005

- Location of the Talbingo Dam in New South Wales
- Country: Australia
- Location: Snowy Mountains, New South Wales
- Coordinates: 35°36′54″S 148°18′04″E
- Purpose: Power
- Status: Operational
- Construction began: 1968
- Opening date: 1971
- Built by: Thiess Brothers
- Owner: Snowy Hydro

Dam and spillways
- Type of dam: Rock-fill dam
- Impounds: Tumut River
- Height: 162 m (531 ft)
- Length: 701 m (2,300 ft)
- Dam volume: 14.488×10^{6} m^{3} (511.6×10^{6} cu ft)
- Spillways: 1
- Spillway type: Concrete chute
- Spillway capacity: 4,290 m^{3}/s (151,000 cu ft/s)

Reservoir
- Creates: Talbingo Reservoir
- Total capacity: 921,400 ML (747,000 acre⋅ft)
- Catchment area: 1,093 km^{2} (422 sq mi)
- Surface area: 1,935.5 ha (4,783 acres)
- Maximum water depth: 110 m (360 ft)

Power Station
- Operator: Snowy Hydro
- Commission date: 1973
- Type: Pumped-storage
- Hydraulic head: 150.9 m (495 ft)
- Turbines: 6
- Installed capacity: 1,800 MW (2,400,000 hp)
- Website www.snowyhydro.com.au

The Talbingo Dam is a major embankment dam across the Tumut River upstream of Talbingo in the Snowy Mountains region of New South Wales, Australia. The impounded reservoir is called Talbingo Reservoir.

== History ==
The concrete-faced rock-filled dam was completed by Thiess Brothers in 1971, and is one of the sixteen major dams that comprise the Snowy Mountains Scheme, a vast hydroelectricity and irrigation complex constructed in south-east Australia between 1949 and 1974, now run by Snowy Hydro.

== Location and features ==
The Talbingo Dam is a major dam on the Tumut River, within the Snowy Mountains, approximately 5 kilometres (3.1 mi) south of the village of Talbingo. The dam was constructed by Thiess Brothers and, at the time, the project was the largest dam ever built in Australia. The dam is the largest and last of the sixteen dams completed as part of the Snowy Mountains Scheme.

The dam wall comprising 14,488,000 cubic metres (511,600,000 cu ft) of rockfill with an upstream sloping silty clay core is 162 metres (531 ft) high and is 701 metres (2,300 ft) long. When full, the reservoir has a capacity of 920,000 megalitres (750,000 acre⋅ft) at an average depth of 70 metres (230 ft). The surface area of Talbingo Reservoir is 1,935.5 hectares (4,783 acres) and the catchment area is 1,093 square kilometres (422 sq mi). The concrete chute spillway is capable of discharging 4,290 cubic metres per second (151,000 cu ft/s).

=== Power generation ===
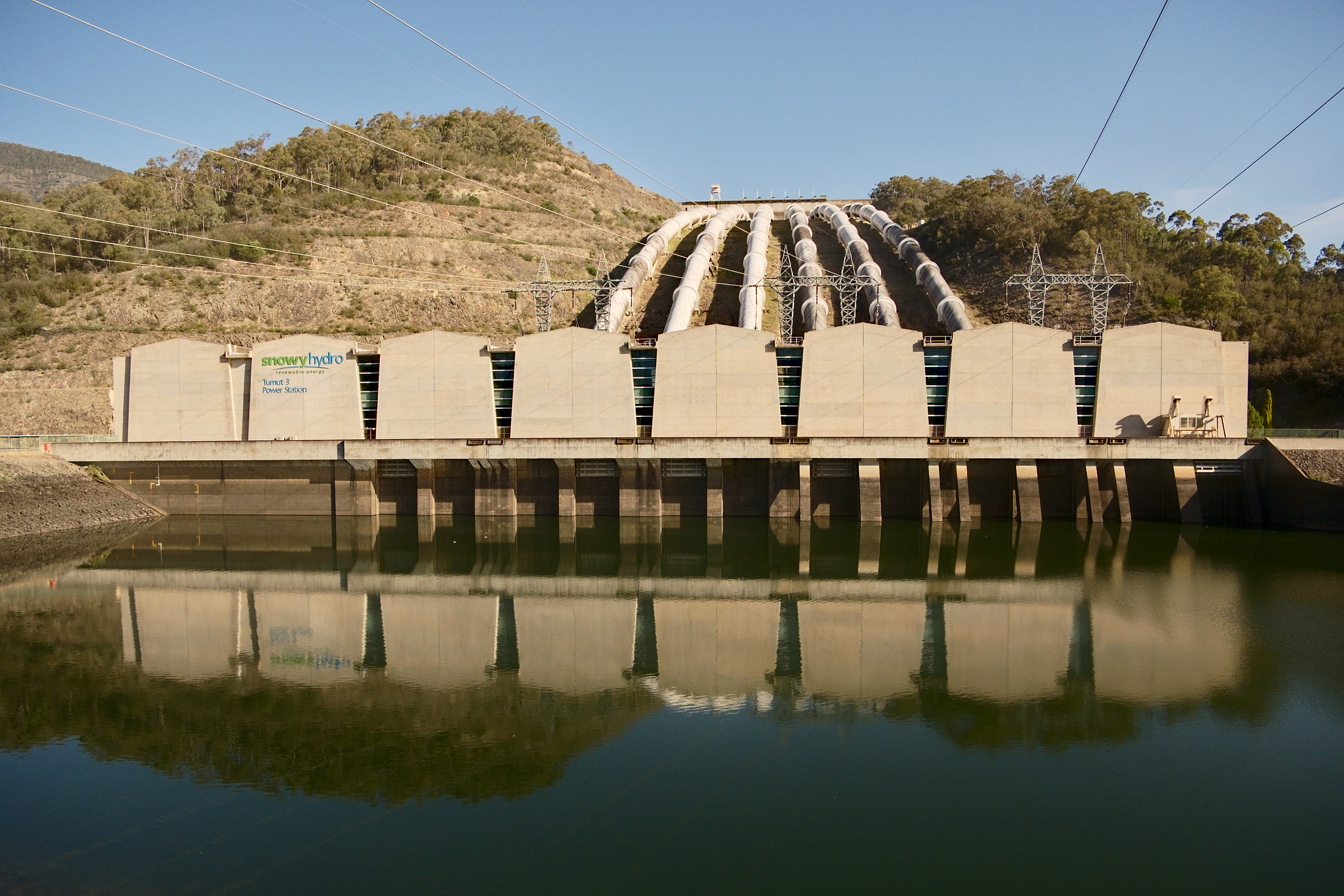
Tumut 3 Power Station

Directly downstream of the dam wall is Tumut 3, a pumped-storage hydroelectric power station, that has six turbine generators (3 of which double as the station's water pumps) with a total generating capacity of 1,800 megawatts (2,400,000 hp) of electricity; with a net generation of 812 gigawatt-hours (2,920 TJ) per annum. The power station has 150.9 metres (495 ft) rated hydraulic head, which flows into the station from 6 large pressure pipes (one for each turbine) from a concrete inlet structure at the edge of the reservoir, built about midway between the proper Talbingo dam and its spillway. The inlet structure can be mistaken by tourists for being the main dam, due to being a far more conspicuous sight from the road that leads into the Talbingo Dam/Tumut 3 complex. The pumps draw water from Jounama Pondage at the rate of 297 cubic metres per second (10,500 cu ft/s), returning water to Talbingo Reservoir for later generation use in periods of peak-demand. The power generated at Tumut 3 serves both New South Wales and Victoria.

The reservoir is a key part of the Snowy 2.0 Pumped Storage Power Station: it will act as the bottom storage for pumped hydro power station.

== Recreation ==
The reservoir is a popular area for fishing; inclusive of Brown Trout, Rainbow Trout, golden perch, Macquarie Perch, redfin, and Trout Cod. Power boating is permitted.

Camping is permitted in Kosciuszko National Park.
