= Snowy Scheme Museum =

Museum in Adaminaby, New South Wales, Australia

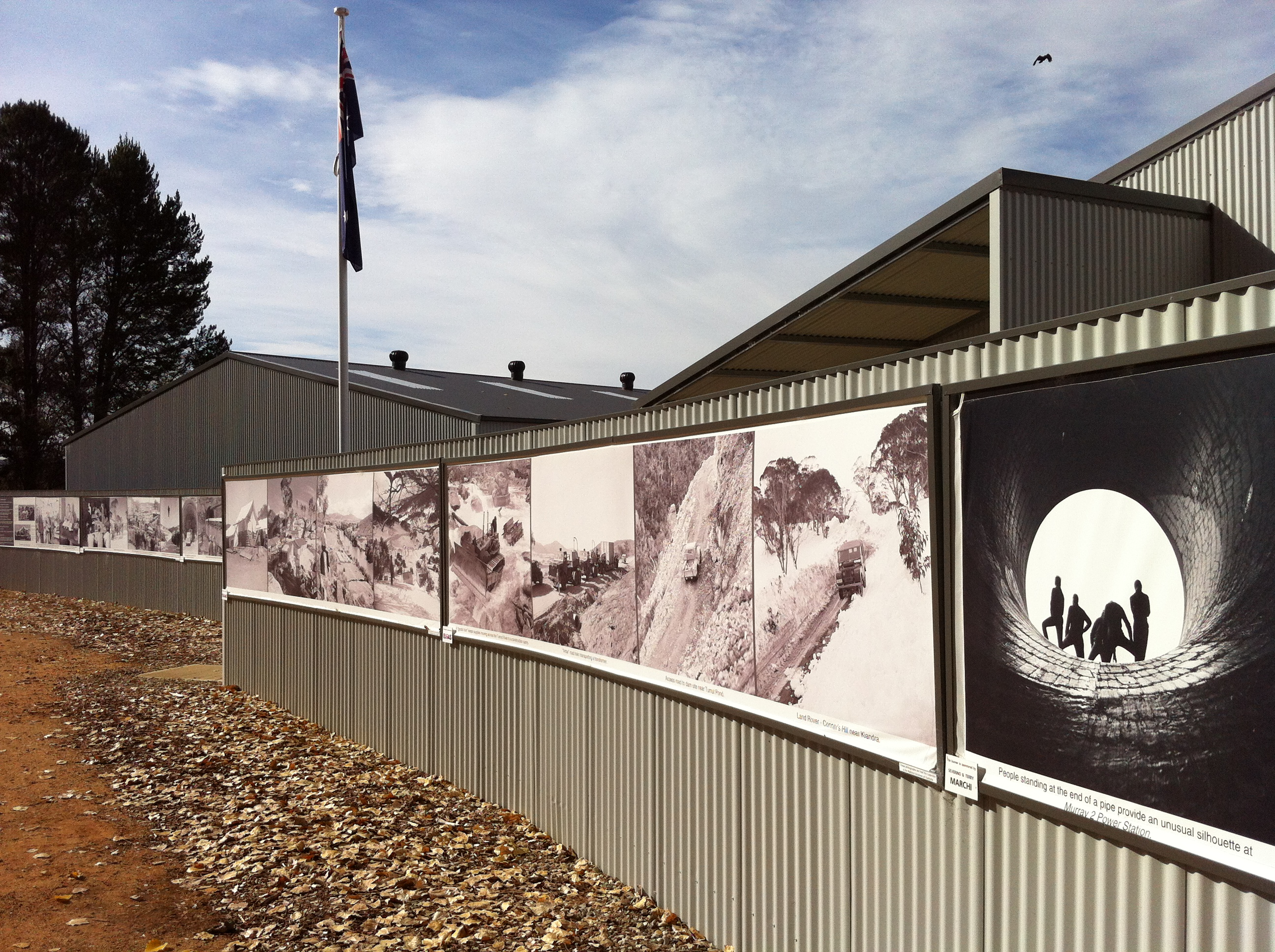
- Established: 2011
- Location: Adaminaby, New South Wales
- Coordinates: 35.9983°S 148.7750°E
- Website: http://www.snowyschememuseum.com.au/

The Snowy Scheme Museum is a museum in the Snowy Mountains town of Adaminaby, New South Wales, Australia. It houses exhibitions relating to the Snowy Mountains Hydro Electric Scheme.

== Overview ==
The Museum tells the story of the construction of the Snowy Mountains Hydro Electric Scheme and what life was like on the Scheme. The collection consists of significant examples of the machines and materials used to build the Scheme. Films, photographic murals and artistic panoramas are also exhibited. The museum concentrates on the stories of the Snowy workers and their impact on Australia, especially on modern Australia's migration program.

The museum collection was gathered by enthusiasts over a ten-year period and the Museum was officially opened to the public by Governor General Quentin Bryce on 17 October 2011. Governor General Bryce told those in attendance: "It is bringing this powerful component of Australia's history into a museum, for people to come and learn the history of the Snowy, for it to be passed down to generations."

== Snowy Scheme ==
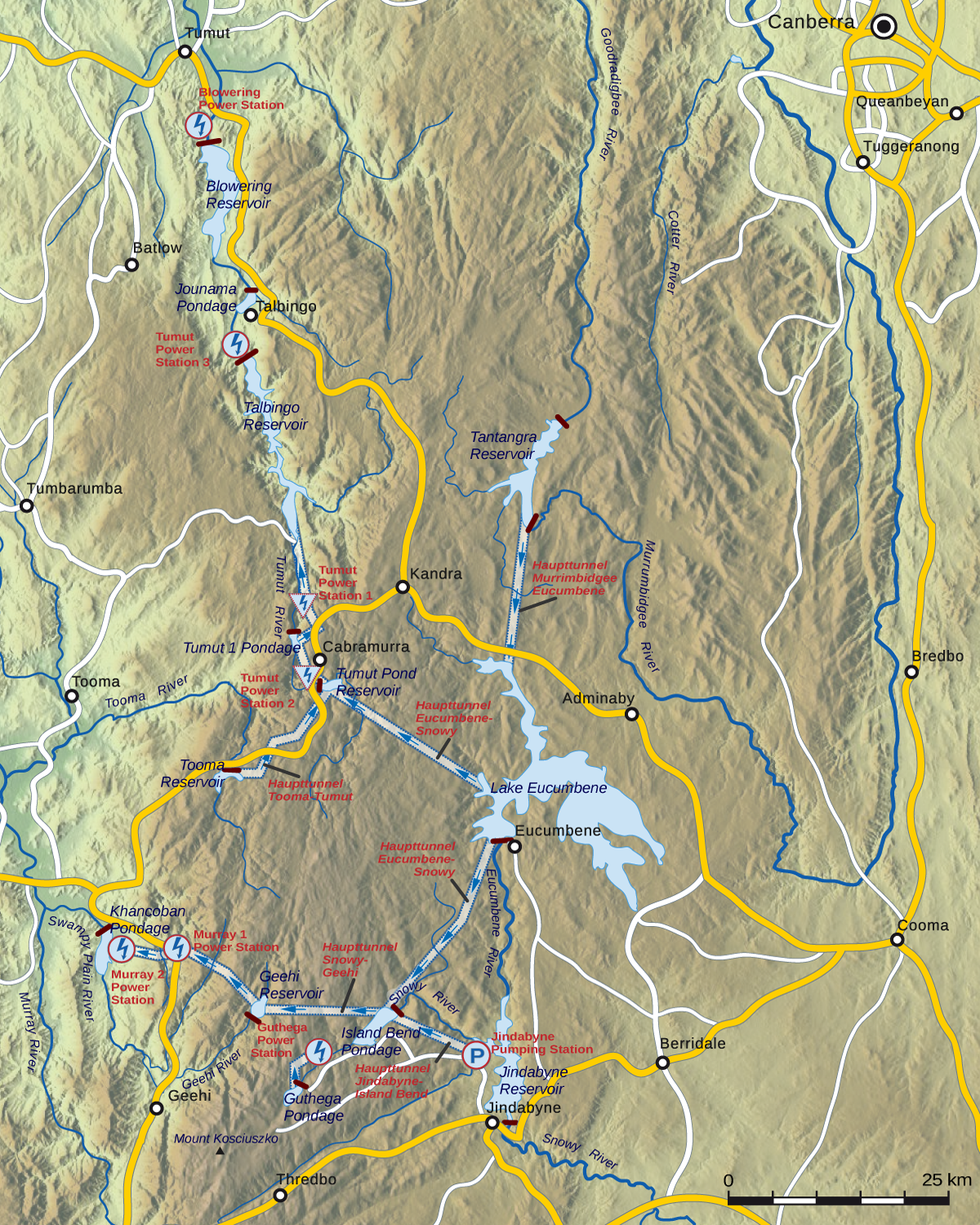
Map of Snowy Mountains Scheme

The Snowy Mountains scheme began construction in 1949 and was completed in 1974. It was a world-class feat of engineering and became a symbol of post-war reconstruction. It involved 100,000 workers from around the world who reversed rivers and built 16 dams, 7 power stations and 145 kilometres of tunnels. Construction of the Scheme necessitated the flooding of the Eucumbene River Valley near Old Adaminaby and resulted in the relocation of the entire population of the township and construction of a new town on the Snowy Mountains Highway away from the rising waters of Lake Eucumbene.
