= Jounama Dam =

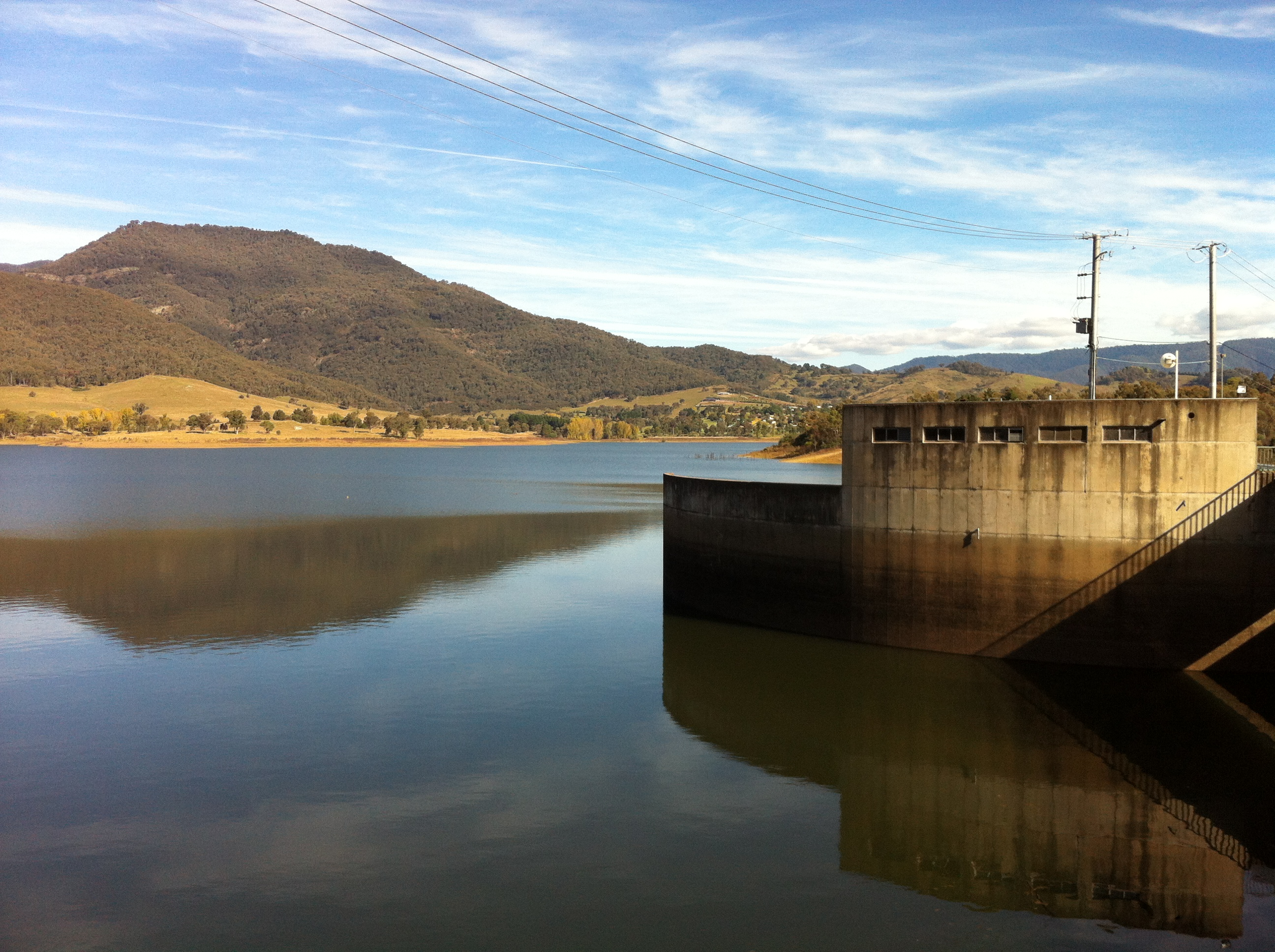
- Jounama Dam looking towards Talbingo, 2012.

- Location of Jounama Dam in New South Wales
- Country: Australia
- Location: Snowy Mountains, New South Wales
- Coordinates: 35°33′46″S 148°18′22″E
- Status: Operational
- Opening date: 1968
- Owner: Snowy Hydro

Dam and spillways
- Type of dam: Embankment dam
- Impounds: Tumut River
- Height: 43.9 m (144 ft)
- Length: 518.2 m (1,700 ft)
- Dam volume: 554,500 m^{3} (19,580,000 cu ft)
- Spillways: 1
- Spillway capacity: 3,965 m^{3}/s (140,000 cu ft/s)

Reservoir
- Creates: Jounama Pondage
- Total capacity: 43,542,000 m^{3} (35,300 acre⋅ft)
- Catchment area: 1,355 km^{2} (523 sq mi)
- Surface area: 3,804 ha (9,400 acres)

Power Station
- Operator: Snowy Hydro
- Commission date: 2010
- Type: Small
- Installed capacity: 14.4 MW (19,300 hp)

Jounama Dam is a major ungated rockfill embankment dam across the Tumut River in the Snowy Mountains of New South Wales, Australia. The dam's main purpose is for the generation of hydro-power and is one of the sixteen major dams that comprise the Snowy Mountains Scheme, a vast hydroelectricity and irrigation complex constructed in south-east Australia between 1949 and 1974 and now run by Snowy Hydro.

The impounded reservoir is called the Jounama Pondage.

== Location and features ==
Completed in 1968, Jounama Dam is a major dam, located approximately 2 kilometres (1.2 mi) north by east of the town of Talbingo. The dam was constructed by Societe Dumez based on engineering plans developed under contract by the Snowy Mountains Hydroelectric Authority. Construction of the dam flooded the historic valley and town of Talbingo.

The dam wall comprising 554,500 cubic metres (19,580,000 cu ft) of rock fill is 44 metres (144 ft) high and 518 metres (1,699 ft) long. At 100% capacity the dam wall holds back 43,542,000 cubic metres (35,300 acre⋅ft) of water. The surface area of Jounama Pondage is 381 hectares (940 acres) and the catchment area is 1,355 square kilometres (523 sq mi). The spillway is capable of discharging 3,965 cubic metres per second (140,000 cu ft/s).

The Snowy Mountains Highway passes adjacent to the reservoir.

=== Power generation ===
A 14.4 megawatts (19,300 hp) small hydroelectric power station was completed in 2010 and is attached to the diverted flow of the Tumut River below the Jounama Dam wall. It is claimed that the small hydro facility generates enough energy to power 6,800 homes.

== See also ==
- List of dams and reservoirs in New South Wales
- Snowy Hydro Limited
- Snowy Mountains Scheme
