= Tooma =

Tooma may refer to:

== Australia ==
- Tooma, New South Wales, village community in Riverina, New South Wales, Australia
- Tooma River, river in the Snowy Mountains of New South Wales, Australia
  - Tooma Dam, the dam on the Tooma River, forming the Tooma Reservoir

== Estonia ==
- Tooma, Estonia, village in Jõgeva Parish, Jõgeva County, Estonia
- Lake Tooma, lake in Tallinn, Estonia

== See also ==
- Toomas
