= Tumbarumba (disambiguation) =

Tumbarumba may refer to:

- Tumbarumba, a town in the Snowy Mountains region of New South Wales, Australia
- Tumbarumba Creek
- Tumbarumba wine region
- Tumbarumba Shire former local government area, merged into Snowy Valleys Council in 2016
- Tumbarumba railway line
- Tumbarumba Australian Football Netball Club
