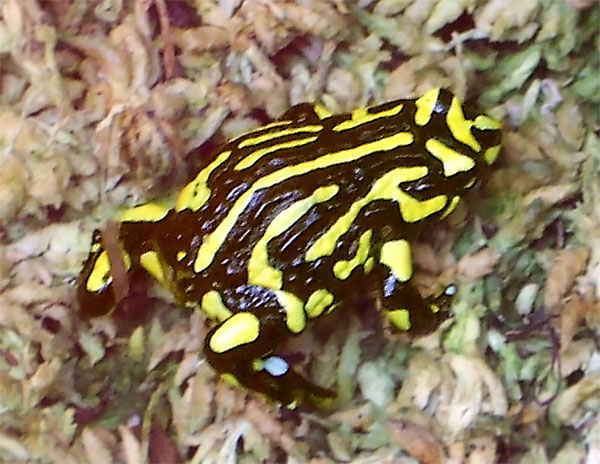

Conservation status
- Critically Endangered (IUCN 3.1)

Scientific classification
- Kingdom: Animalia
- Phylum: Chordata
- Class: Amphibia
- Order: Anura
- Family: Myobatrachidae
- Genus: Pseudophryne
- Species: P. corroboree

Binomial name
- Pseudophryne corroboree Moore, 1953

= Southern corroboree frog =

Species of amphibian

The southern corroboree frog (Pseudophryne corroboree) is a species of Australian ground frog native to southeastern Australia. They are yellow and black in colour.

The species was described in 1953 by Fulbright research scholar John A. Moore from a specimen collected at Towong Hill Station at Corryong, Victoria, and sent to the Australian Museum. The curator, Roy Kinghorn, recognised it as a new species and allowed Moore to describe it.

== Description ==
Adult female southern corroboree frogs are 26–31 mm (1.0–1.2 in) long, while males measure 22–29 mm (0.87–1.14 in); both bear vivid yellow and black stripes across the head, back, and limbs. The body and head are short and wide, the snout has a slight point, and the fingers and toes lack webbing. The iris is black. The northern corroboree frog has narrower and more greenish-yellow striping.

Sexual maturity of P. corroboree is reached at four years of age, with one year as an embryo/tadpole and two years as a juvenile/subadult. Adults primarily have only one breeding season. Breeding occurs around December terrestrially near shallow pools, fens, seepages, wet grassland or wet heaths, where the males build chamber nests within the grasses and moss. Males compete for females via song. Each male will attract up to ten females to his burrow sequentially and may dig a new burrow if his first is filled with eggs. The female lays up to 38 eggs and the male grasps her and deposits sperm directly onto the eggs. Tadpoles develop but remain within the protective egg coat until hatching occurs when high ground-water levels after rain cause the nest to become flooded at 4 to 6 months. Tadpole development takes six to eight months. Metamorphosis occurs between December and February.

The typical diet of a mature southern corroboree frog includes beetles, mites, ants and insect larvae. However, as tadpoles they also tend to eat algae and other small pieces of organic material found in their pools.

== Habitat and conservation ==
Southern corroboree frogs live at altitudes of 1,300–1,760 m (4,270–5,770 ft) above sea level, historically in an area now within Kosciuszko National Park in the Snowy Mountains of NSW, from Smiggin Holes in the south, and northwards to the Maragle Range. Reported as abundant during the 1970s, it declined drastically during the 1980s from chytridiomycosis. The species are critically endangered, with the wild population thought to number around 30 individuals. The natural habitat is sphagnum bog at elevations greater than 1,200 m (3,900 ft).

The main threats to the survival of the frogs are thought to be infection with the chytrid fungus and bushfires. Other threats to the southern species include residential and commercial development (including ski resorts); climate change (causing drought and fires); and pollution.

Efforts to conserve the species have included establishing captive breeding programs across four institutions: the Amphibian Research Centre in 1997, Melbourne Zoo in 2001, Taronga Zoo in 2006, and Healesville Sanctuary in 2007. By 2018, there were over 400 southern corroboree frogs in zoos. Conservationists have stepped up efforts to increase the population of the southern corroboree frog since the 2019–20 bushfires. In March 2022, 100 frogs were released into the park as part of a joint breeding program between Taronga Zoo, Zoos Victoria, the NSW National Parks and Wildlife Service and the NSW Government's "Saving our Species" program. At this time there are five enclosures for the frogs, with the newest one built to better withstand the effect of fire.

Five breeding enclosures have established in Kosciuszko National Park. Two-thirds of the frogs in these perished in the 2019–20 Australian bushfires. In 2022, a further 100 frogs were released from captive breeding programs.

The southern corroboree frog was considered relatively numerous within its very small distribution in the 1970s, as of June 2004 it had an estimated adult population of 64, but suffered declines of up to 80% over the 10 years up to 1989, at which time it was found only within a fragmented region of less than 10 km^{2} (3.9 sq mi) within Kosciuszko National Park. It has been listed as critically endangered since at least 2004 and is considered to be one of Australia's most endangered species. There are fewer than 30 individuals left in the wild as of March 2022.
