= Paur =

Paur is a surname. Notable people with the surname include:

- Emil Paur (1855–1932), Austrian orchestra conductor
- Frank Paur, American television director of animated cartoons
- Gary Paur (born 1947), American politician
- Jakub Paur (born 1992), Slovak football midfielder
- Leonard De Paur (1914–1998), African-American composer, choral director and arts administrator
- Toomas Paur (born 1949), Estonian politician.

== See also ==
- Pauer
