= Paddys River =

Paddys River may refer to:

== Locality ==
- Paddys River, Australian Capital Territory, a locality west of Tuggeranong in the ACT
- Paddys River, New South Wales, a locality in the Southern Highlands of New South Wales, Australia
- Paddys River (Snowy Valleys), New South Wales, a locality in the Snowy Valleys Council LGA of New South Wales, Australia

== Waterways ==
- Paddys River (Australian Capital Territory), flows into the Cotter River
- Paddys River (Southern Highlands, New South Wales), which flows through the Southern Highlands of New South Wales
- Paddys River (South West Slopes, New South Wales), which flows through the South West Slopes of New South Wales
