= Pauer =

Pauer is a surname. Notable people with the surname include:

- Ernst Pauer (1826–1905), Austrian pianist, composer and educator
- Fritz Pauer (1943–2012), Austrian jazz pianist, composer and bandleader
- Géza Pauer (born 1976), Hungarian sprinter
- Jiří Pauer (1919–2007), Czech composer
- Maria Pauer (1734/36–1750), Austrian witch

== See also ==
- Paur
