= Selwyn County, New South Wales =

Selwyn New South Wales
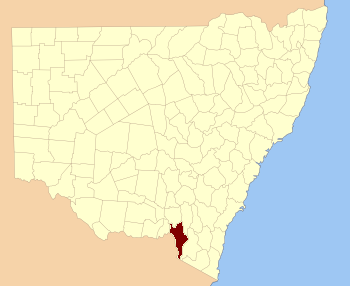
- Location in New South Wales
Lands administrative divisions around Selwyn:
Goulburn	Wynyard	Buccleuch
Goulburn	Selwyn	Wallace
Benambra (Vic)	Tambo (Vic)	Wallace

Selwyn County is one of the 141 cadastral divisions of New South Wales. It is located to the east of the Murray River, with part of the Tumut River as its boundary to the north-east. It includes Mount Kosciuszko, the highest mountain in Australia.

Selwyn County was named in honour of geologist Alfred Richard Cecil Selwyn (1824–1902).

== Parishes within this county ==
A full list of parishes found within this county. After the local government mergers of 2016, all parishes of Selwyn County are in the Snowy Valleys Council.

Parish	Coordinates
Beaumont	35°45′54″S 148°10′04″E
Boganyera	35°54′54″S 147°57′04″E
Bringenbrong	36°07′54″S 148°03′04″E
Buccleuch	35°44′54″S 148°18′04″E
Buddong	35°38′54″S 148°16′04″E
Burra	35°51′54″S 148°03′04″E
Clear Hill	36°04′54″S 148°26′04″E
Cowra	35°55′54″S 148°17′04″E
Craven	35°40′54″S 147°50′04″E
Dargals	36°09′54″S 148°18′04″E
Geehi	36°19′54″S 148°06′04″E
Glenken	35°55′54″S 147°48′04″E
Glenroy	35°44′54″S 147°51′04″E
Greg Greg	36°03′54″S 148°03′04″E
Gungartan	36°13′54″S 148°22′04″E
Hay	35°51′54″S 148°09′04″E
Hume	36°19′54″S 148°11′04″E
Indi	36°13′54″S 148°04′04″E
Jagumba	35°58′54″S 148°17′04″E
Jagungal	36°10′54″S 148°23′04″E
Jingellic East	35°52′54″S 147°45′04″E
Khancoban	36°10′54″S 148°11′04″E
King	35°44′54″S 148°05′04″E
Kosciusko	36°30′54″S 148°12′04″E
Lea	36°07′54″S 148°10′04″E
Manjar	35°51′54″S 148°19′04″E
Mannus	35°49′54″S 147°57′04″E
Maragle	35°53′54″S 148°09′04″E
Mate	35°39′54″S 147°53′04″E
Munderoo	35°49′54″S 147°51′04″E
Munyang	36°12′54″S 148°27′04″E
Murray	36°12′54″S 148°16′04″E
Nurenmerenmong	35°49′54″S 148°15′04″E
Ournie	35°56′54″S 147°52′04″E
Round Hill	35°58′54″S 148°23′04″E
Scott	35°59′54″S 148°30′04″E
Selwyn	35°49′54″S 148°24′04″E
Table Top	35°55′54″S 148°24′04″E
Tooma	35°55′54″S 148°04′04″E
Tougaroo	36°33′54″S 148°13′04″E
Tumbarumba	35°51′54″S 148°02′04″E
Twynam	36°41′54″S 148°13′04″E
Victoria	36°25′54″S 148°08′04″E
Wallace	35°47′54″S 148°19′04″E
Welaregang	35°58′54″S 147°56′04″E
Welumba	35°58′54″S 148°08′04″E
Yellowin	35°27′54″S 148°14′04″E
Youngal	36°13′54″S 148°10′04″E
