= John Alexander Moore =

- Born: June 27, 1915; Charles Town, West Virginia
- Died: May 26, 2002 (aged 86); Riverside, California
- Education: B.S Columbia College (1936): Ph.D Columbia University (1940)
- Title: President, Society for the Study of Evolution (1963): President, American Society of Zoologists (1974); Professor Emeritus of Biology at University of California, Riverside (1982)
- Spouse: Betty Clark
- Children: Sally Moore Gall
- Awards: Fellow, Guggenheim Foundation (1959): Fellow, American Academy of Arts and Sciences (1960); Member, National Academy of Sciences (1963); Education Award, American Institute for Biological Sciences (2002)

John Alexander Moore (June 27, 1915 – May 26, 2002) was an American zoology professor.

== Early life and education ==
Moore was born to Louise Hammond Blume and George Douglas Moore, a lawyer, in Charles Town, West Virginia in 1915. Four years later his parents divorced and Moore traveled with his mother first to Carson City, Nevada, and Oakland, California, until she remarried and moved the family to Markham, Virginia, two years after her divorce. Although the schools he attended at the time were not the best, Moore's location in the Blue Ridge Mountains kindled his interest in birds from a young age; Moore published his first academic article in The Auk at age 15. In the early 1930s Moore's mother divorced again and took the family to Washington, D.C., and then to New York City. Moore finished his last two years of high school at Haaren High School. He also volunteered at the American Museum of Natural History. Despite his humble background he was accepted to Columbia College as an undergraduate after a strong interview. While there, he married fellow embryology graduate student Betty Clark in 1938. Both had studied under Lester Barth. It was likely Moore's suggestion in the 1930s that influenced Lester Sharp and Franz Schrader to coin the term kinetochore, which refers to a genetic structure key to chromosome congression during metazoan mitosis.

== Career ==
From 1939 to 1941 Moore tutored biology at Brooklyn College and from 1941 to 1943 he taught biology at Queens College. In 1943 Moore was hired by Barnard College to teach zoology. He was promoted to full professor in 1950 and was made the chair of the zoology department at Columbia University. Moore received a Fulbright Scholarship in 1952; he and his wife spent a year in Australia using cross-fertilization to study frog speciation. The resulting monograph, published in 1961, described 94 frog species. An illustration of one of the frogs discussed in Moore's monograph, the Corroboree frog, was featured on an Australian postage stamp. No longer a department chair, Moore continued teaching at Columbia until 1968 when he was hired by University of California, Riverside (UCR). Although Moore reached mandatory retirement age in 1982, UCR allowed Moore to keep his office and continue to teach until his death in 2002.

Since 2013, Moore has been listed on the Advisory Council of the National Center for Science Education.

== Published works ==
In his lifetime, Moore published more than 180 journal articles and books. In 1957, Moore published a seminal textbook, Principles of Zoology. From 1960 to 1976, Moore developed and supervised the yellow version of the Biological Sciences Curriculum Study (BSCS). With the wide implementation of BSCS, the yellow version sold two million copies and was adapted for use in 11 different countries. During his retirement, Moore pursued improving methods of teaching science, publishing the Science as a Way of Knowing series. Moore became a vocal opponent of creationism. He wrote several publications about this issue including Science and Creationism: A View from the National Academy of Sciences in 1999. His last publication, From Genesis to Genetics, was written as a repudiation of efforts to replace the science curriculum with biblical literalism.

- Moore, John Alexander (1957). Principles of Zoology.
- Biological science: an inquiry into life. Biological Sciences Curriculum Study. 1968. ISBN 9780153608100.
- "Science for Society: A Bibliography" (PDF). American Association for the Advancement of Science. 1970.
- From Genesis to Genetics: The Case of Evolution and Creationism. 2003.
