= Tumbarumba Creek =

Coordinates: 35°56′S 148°03′E

- Etymology: Aboriginal: 1. (Wiradjuri) dhamba dhamba, meaning "very soft" 2. words for "hollow sounding ground", "thunder", "sound" or "place of big trees".

Location
- Country: Australia
- State: New South Wales
- Region: IBRA: Australian Alps, Riverina, Snowy Mountains, South West Slopes
- Local government area: Snowy Valleys

Physical characteristics
- Source: Tumbarumba Hill, Snowy Mountains
  - location: south of Laurel Hill
  - elevation: 611 m (2,005 ft)
- Mouth: confluence with the Tooma River
  - location: south of Tooma
  - elevation: 252 m (827 ft)
- Length: 30 km (19 mi)

Basin features
- River system: Murray River, Murray–Darling basin
- Tributaries
  - left: Maragle Creek, Paddys River
  - right: Mannus Creek
- Nature reserve: Bogandyera Nature Reserve

Tumbarumba Creek, a watercourse of the Murray catchment within the Murray–Darling basin, is located in the region bordering the Riverina and Australian Alps of New South Wales, Australia.

== Course and features ==
The creek rises below Tumbarumba Hill, south of Laurel Hill, on the western slopes of the Snowy Mountains, and its natural flow drains generally south, joined by three tributaries including Paddys River, before reaching its confluence with the Tooma River, south of the village of Tooma, descending 358 metres (1,175 ft) over its 30 kilometres (19 mi) course.

== See also ==
- List of rivers of New South Wales (L–Z)
- Rivers of New South Wales
- List of rivers of Australia
