= Mannus, New South Wales =

Mannus
- Town
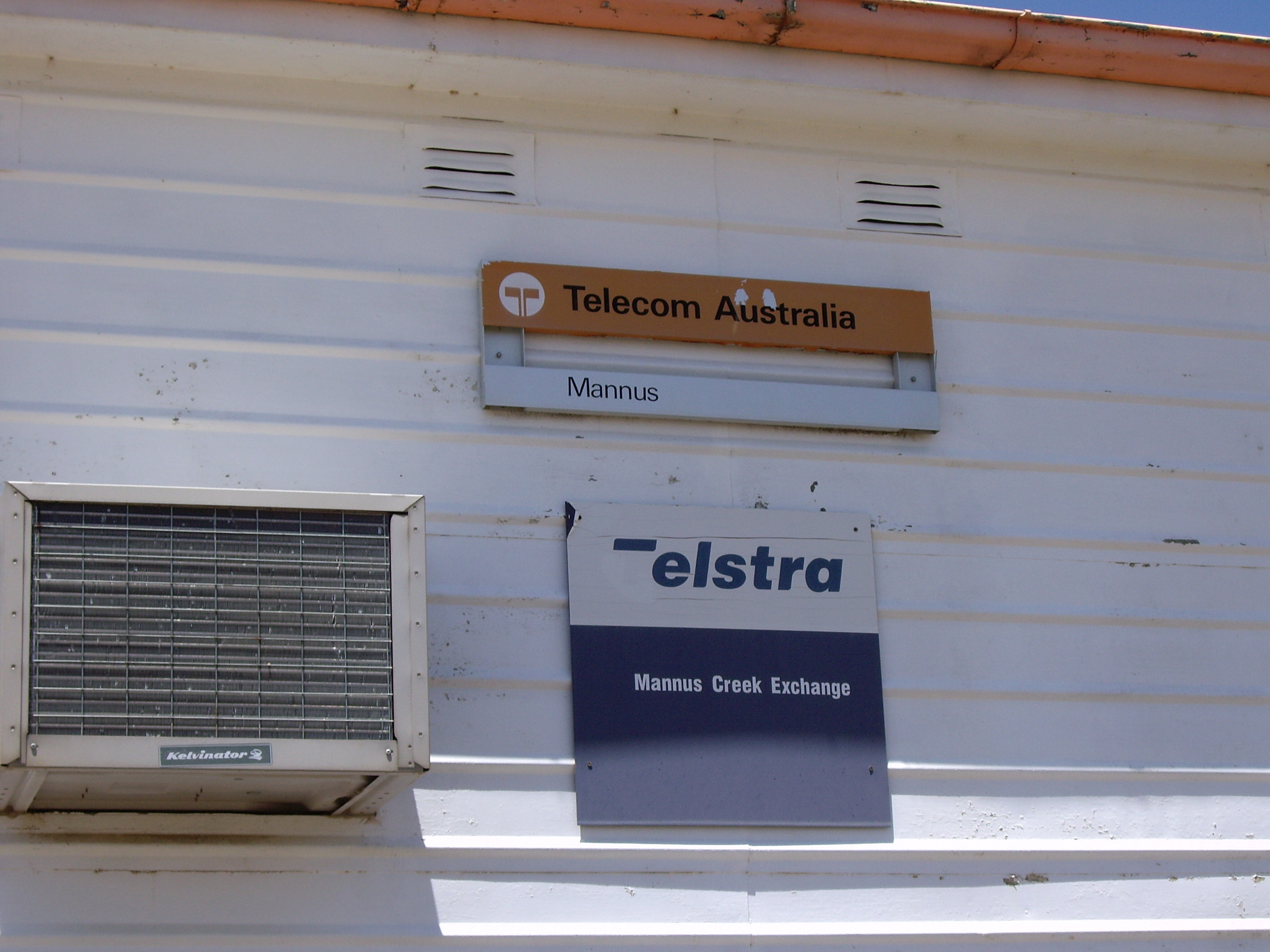
- Mannus Telephone Exchange -the only building that can be photographed in Mannus (it is illegal to photograph the Correctional Centre)

- Coordinates: 35°47′57″S 147°56′14″E
- Country: Australia
- State: New South Wales
- LGA: Snowy Valleys Council
- Location: 9 km (5.6 mi) from Tumbarumba; 11 km (6.8 mi) from Munderoo

Government
  - State electorate: Albury
- Elevation: 444 m (1,457 ft)

Population
  - Total: 225 (SAL 2021)
- Postcode: 2653
- County: Selwyn

Mannus is a small rural community in the south east part of the Riverina. It is about 9 kilometres (6 mi) west from Tumbarumba and 11 kilometres (7 mi) east from Munderoo.

Mannus is the home to the Mannus Correctional Centre situated on Linden Roth Drive (the road between Tumbarumba and Munderoo). The centre provides minimum-security incarceration for 164 full-time male prisoners. There is also a periodic detention centre for both males and females nearby and these detainees undertake community projects on weekends.

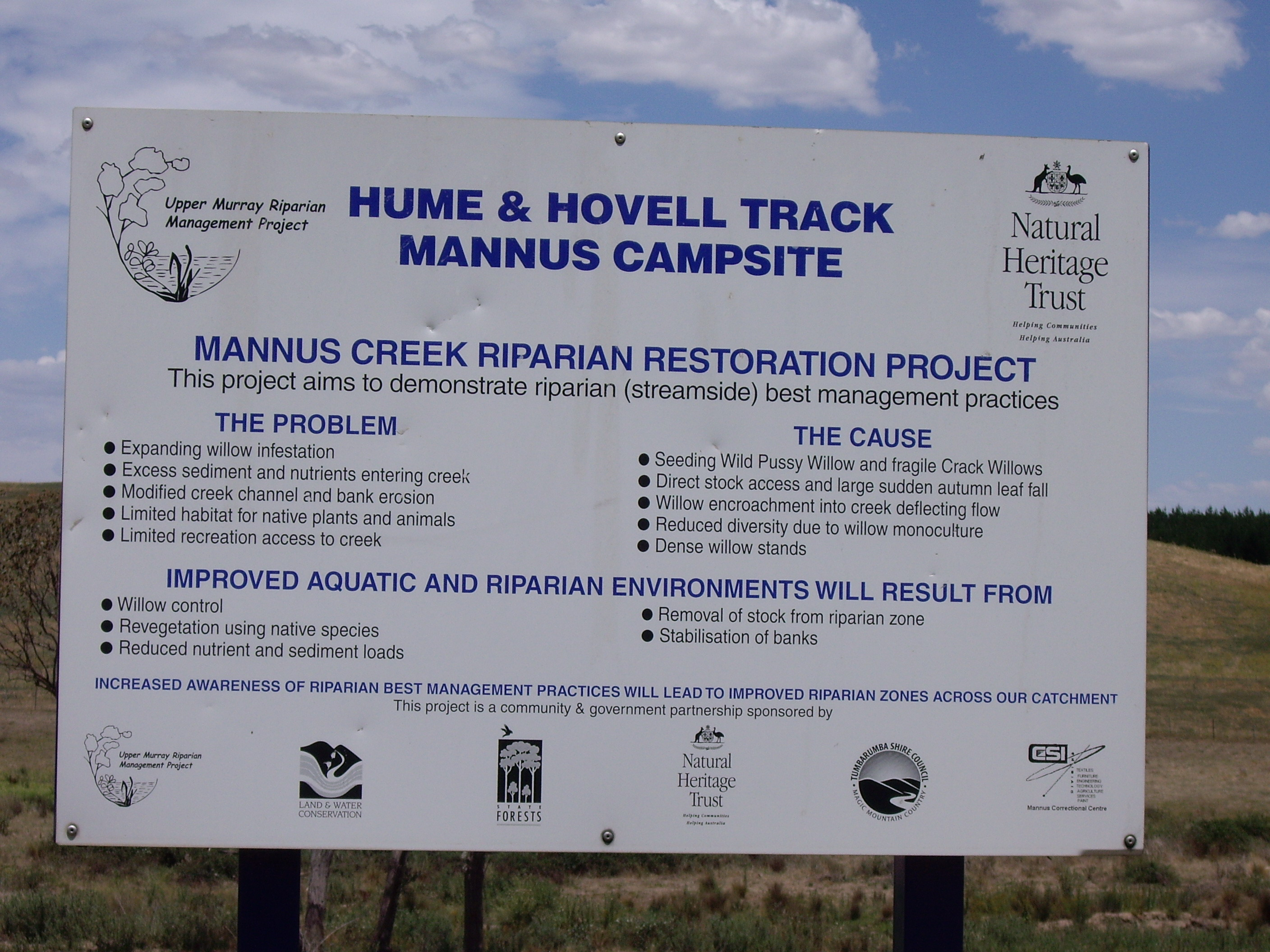
Mannus Campsite - part of the Hume and Hovell Track

Other than the Correctional Centre the only public establishments in the area are the remote telephone exchange (called the Mannus Creek Exchange) and the Mannus Campsite including Mannus Lake — both of which are linked to the Hume & Hovell Walking Track, which is part of the National Trust. These campsites are only suitable for small tents and there are very limited sites.

In October 2010 Mannus Lake was inundated with water run-off after days of rain. The dam wall had approximately 600 millimetres (24 in) of water over the top, which is approximately 3 metres (10 ft) above the spillway. About one third of the wall was washed away early on Saturday 16 October 2010, emptying the lake. It does not appear to have been repaired as of 2 January 2011.
