= Toomas =

Male given name

- Gender: Male
- Language: Estonian
- Name day: 21 December

Origin
- Region of origin: Estonia

Toomas is an Estonian masculine given name, a cognate of Thomas.

People named Toomas include:

- Toomas Alatalu (born 1942), historian, educator, political commentator and politician
- Toomas Altnurme (born 1973), painter
- Toomas Annus (born 1960), entrepreneur
- Toomas Frey (1937–2020), ecologist, geobotanist and forest scientist
- Toomas Heikkinen (born 1991), Finnish rallycross driver
- Toomas Helin (born 1966), drug smuggler
- Toomas Hiio (born 1965), historian
- Toomas Hussar (born 1962), actor, film and theatre director and dramaturge
- Toomas Hendrik Ilves (born 1953), politician, President of Estonia
- Toomas Järveoja (born 1961), Estonian politician
- Toomas Jürgenstein (born 1964), educator and politician
- Toomas Kaldma (1943–2026), footballer, referee and coach
- Toomas Kall (born 1947), humorist, caricaturist, writer, screenwriter and translator
- Toomas Kallaste (born 1971), football player
- Toomas Kandimaa (born 1975), basketball player and coach
- Toomas Kivimägi (born 1963), politician and lawyer
- Toomas Kivisild (born 1969), geneticist
- Toomas Kork (born 1945), social activist, businessman and politician
- Toomas Krõm (born 1971), football player
- Toomas Kukk (born 1971), botanist
- Toomas Leius (born 1941), tennis player
- Toomas Liivak (born 1970), basketball player
- Toomas Merila (born 1939), track and field athlete and coach
- Toomas Napa (born 1953), racing driver
- Toomas Paur (born 1949), politician
- Toomas Proovel (born 1973), wrestler
- Toomas Raadik (born 1990), basketball player
- Toomas Raudam (born 1947), writer
- Toomas Rein (born 1940), architect
- Toomas Savi (born 1942), politician
- Toomas Sildmäe (born 1959), entrepreneur, politician, motorsportsman and sportsman
- Toomas Sulling (born 1940), surgeon
- Toomas Tammaru (born 1968), lepidopterist and professor of entomology
- Toomas Tarm (born 1968), marathon runner
- Toomas Tohver (born 1973), football goalkeeper
- Toomas Tõnise (born 1952), modern pentathlete
- Toomas Tõniste (born 1967), sailor and a politician
- Toomas Triisa (born 1982), rally driver
- Toomas Turb (born 1957), competitive runner
- Toomas Uba (1943–2000), sports journalist
- Toomas Uibo (born 1971), Estonian aviation specialist, singer and politician
- Toomas Urb (born 1958), actor and singer
- Toomas Väinaste (born 1950), politician
- Toomas Varek (born on 1948), politician
- Toomas Vilosius (born 1951), politician
- Toomas Vilpart (born 1971), rower
- Toomas Vint (born 1944), painter and writer
- Toomas Vitsut (born 1960), politician
- Toomas Voll (born 1958), composer, conductor and choir director

Fictional characters

- Toomas Nipernaadi, main character from August Gailit's 1929 novel Toomas Nipernaadi.
