= Paddys River Falls =

Waterfall in New South Wales, Australia

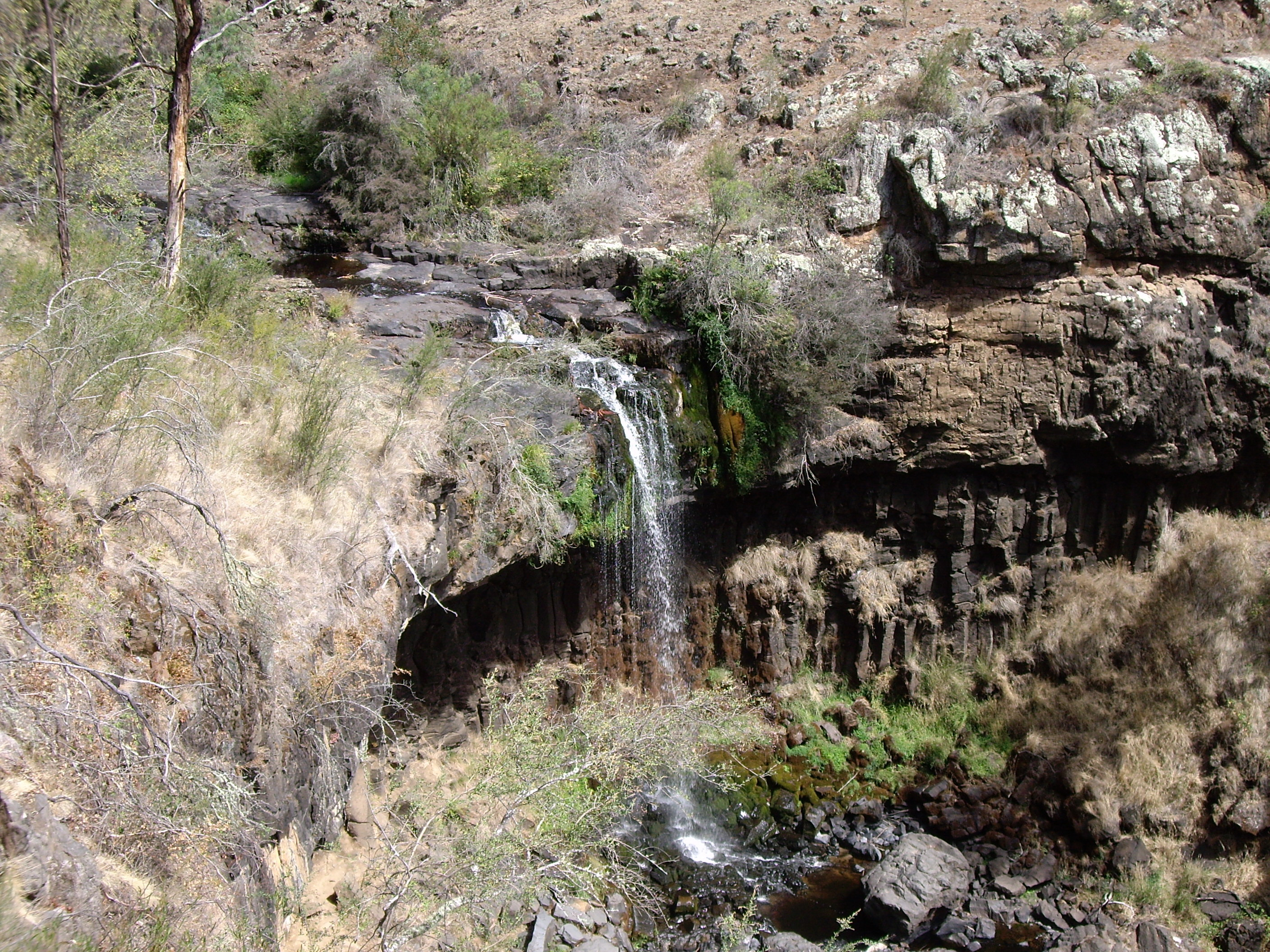
- Paddys River Falls

- Location within New South Wales
- Location: Tumbarumba, Riverina, New South Wales, Australia
- Coordinates: 35.8597°S 148.1149°E
- Type: Cascade
- Total height: 18 metres (59 ft)
- Watercourse: Paddys River

The Paddys River Falls, sometimes also Paddy's River Falls, is a cascade waterfall located on the Paddys River, situated approximately 15 kilometres (9.3 mi) south of Tumbarumba, in the eastern Riverina region of New South Wales, Australia.

The falls are 18 metres (59 ft) in height and the water flows over the drop and then continues down the Paddys River.

Adjacent to the falls on the Tumbarumba to Tooma Road is a barbecue and picnic area situated above the falls. A staired 150-metre (490 ft) track from the picnic area leads to the base of the falls.

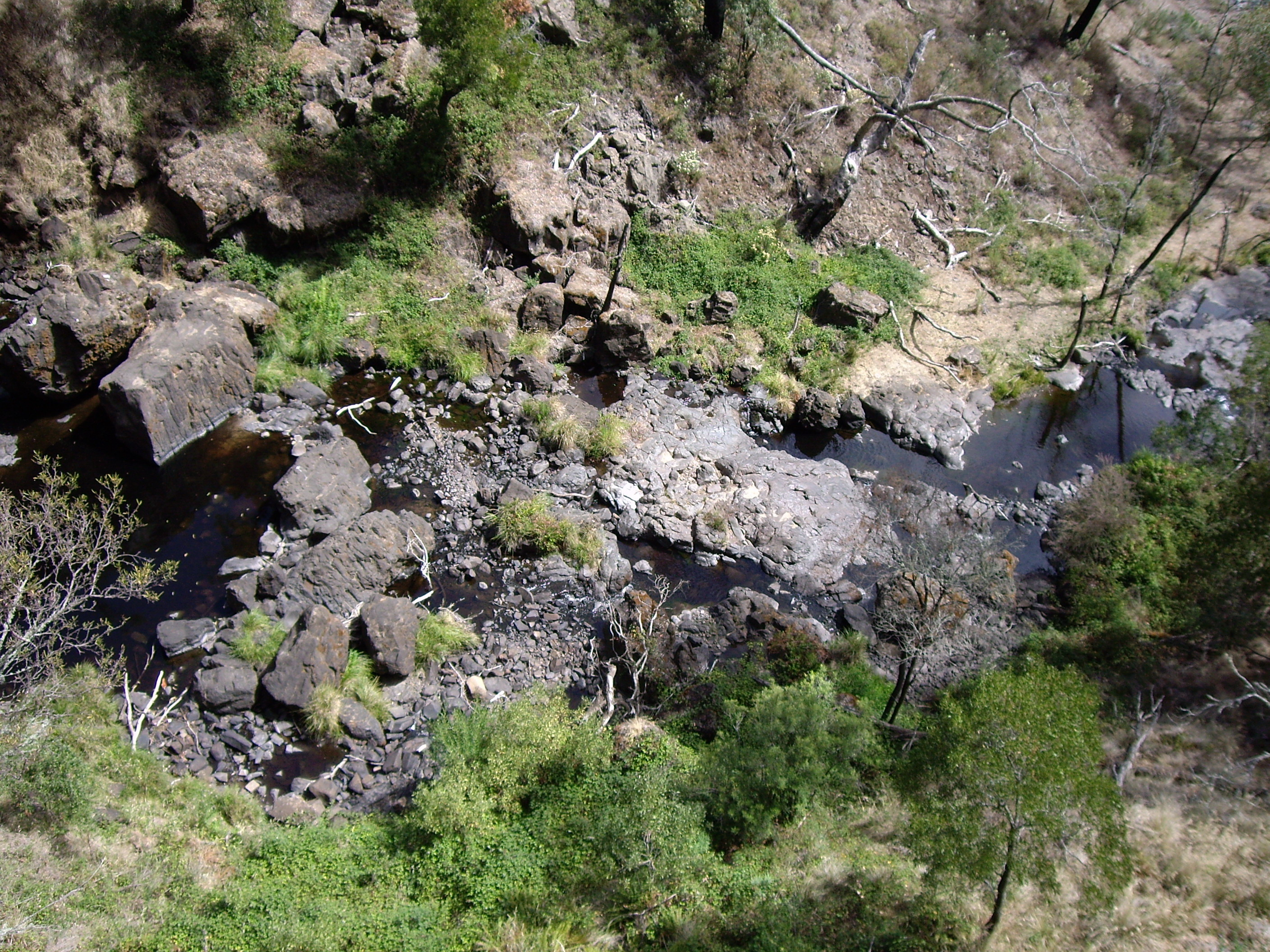
Paddys River

== See also ==
- List of waterfalls
- List of waterfalls in Australia
