= Munderoo =

- Town
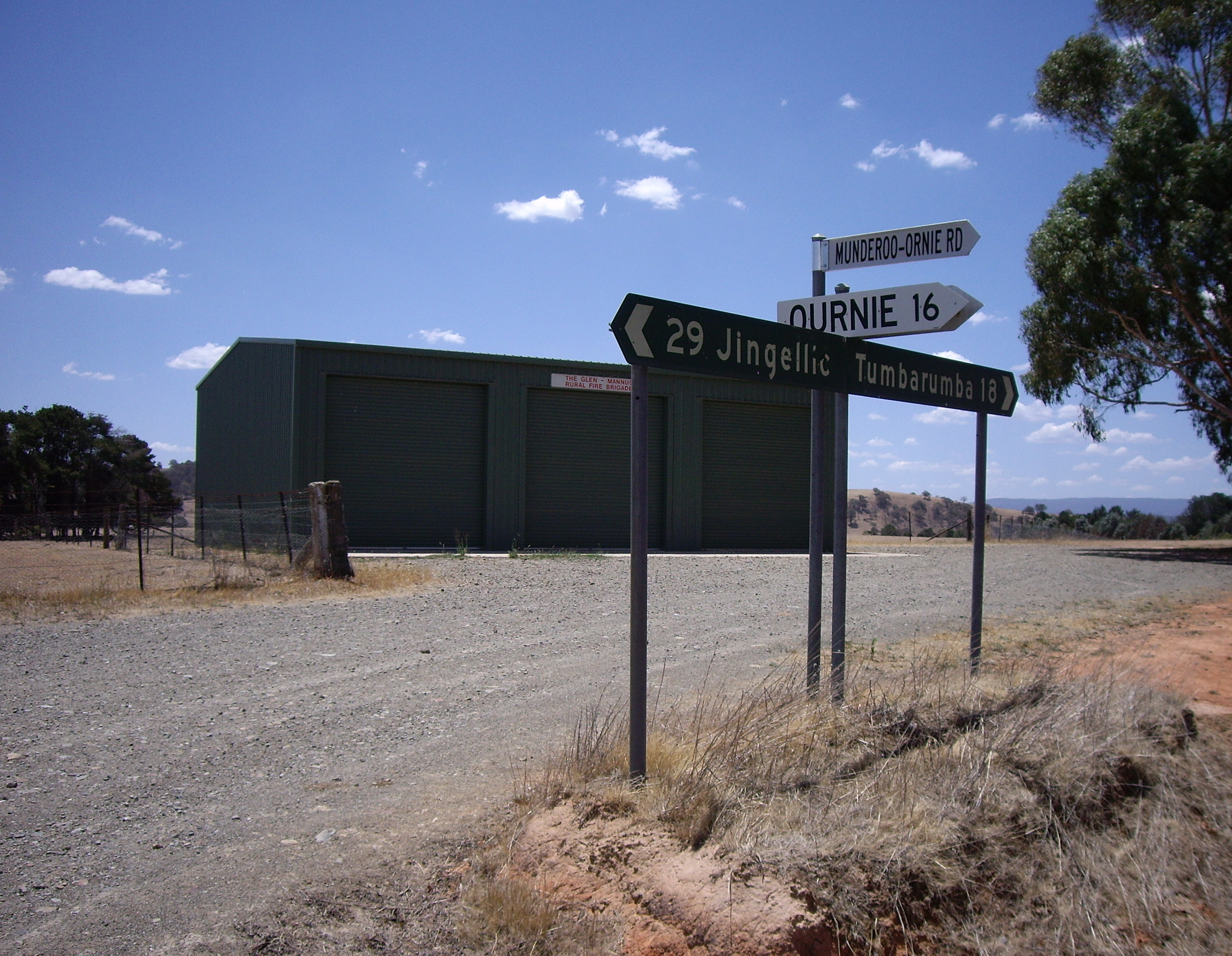
- Munderoo - showing Bush Fire Brigade Shed

- Coordinates: 35°51′S 147°52′E
- Country: Australia
- State: New South Wales
- Location: 11 km (6.8 mi) from Mannus; 16 km (9.9 mi) from Ournie

Government
  - State electorate: Albury
- Elevation: 561 m (1,841 ft)

Population
  - Total: 58 (2021 census)
- Postcode: 2653
- County: Selwyn

Munderoo is a rural community in the south east part of the Riverina. It is situated about 11 kilometres west from Mannus, and 16 kilometres north from Ournie. At the 2021 census, Munderoo had a population of 58 people.

The area took its name from a farming property Mundaroo which is situated near the Ournie Road and Linden Roth Drive T-intersection.

The only public building in the area is the Bush Fire Brigade Shed situated on that same intersection.
