= Ournie, New South Wales =

Ournie
- Town
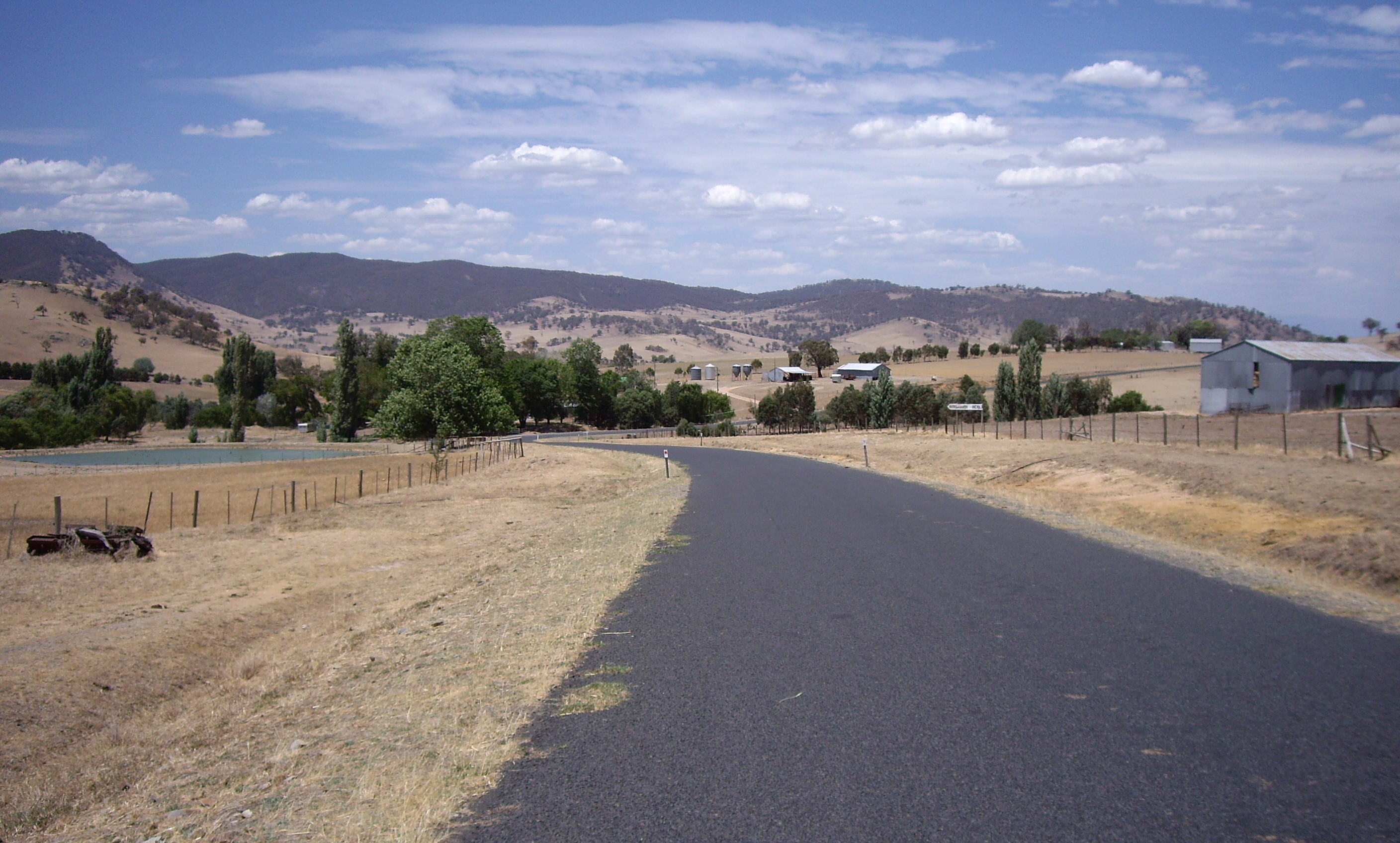
- Ournie

- Coordinates: 35°56′41″S 147°50′58″E
- Country: Australia
- State: New South Wales
- Location: 15 km (9.3 mi) from Welaregang; 20 km (12 mi) from Munderoo

Government
  - State electorate: Albury
- Elevation: 516 m (1,693 ft)

Population
  - Total: 34 (2021 census)
- Postcode: 2640
- County: Selwyn

Ournie is a rural community in the far south east part of the Riverina and situated about 15 kilometres north west from Welaregang and 20 kilometres south from Munderoo. Ournie is situated on the banks of the Ournie Creek which flows into the Murray River and the area is only about 4 kilometres from the border of Victoria.

While never a major mining field, Ournie was the site of gold mining. There was a settlement that grew to have a population of over 400 people in the late 1800s. 111.44 kg (3,583 ounces) of gold was mined from a quartz reef, known as the Isabella Reef, from 1875 to 1901. The Peep-O-Day mine, produced 214.61 kg (6,900 oz), from a different quartz reef, between 1875 and 1906.

The mining settlement was centred around the gold mining area at 35°56′26.1″S 147°47′48.9″E. The remains of the old mine shafts still exist at this location. The site is now located on private property.

Ournie Post Office opened on 1 July 1872, closed in 1875, reopened in 1904 and closed again in 1968. There was a school there, from May 1879 to December 1969.

Ouranee is an earlier spelling of the name and, prior to 1977, it was used for Ournie Creek and the cadestral parish of Ournie.

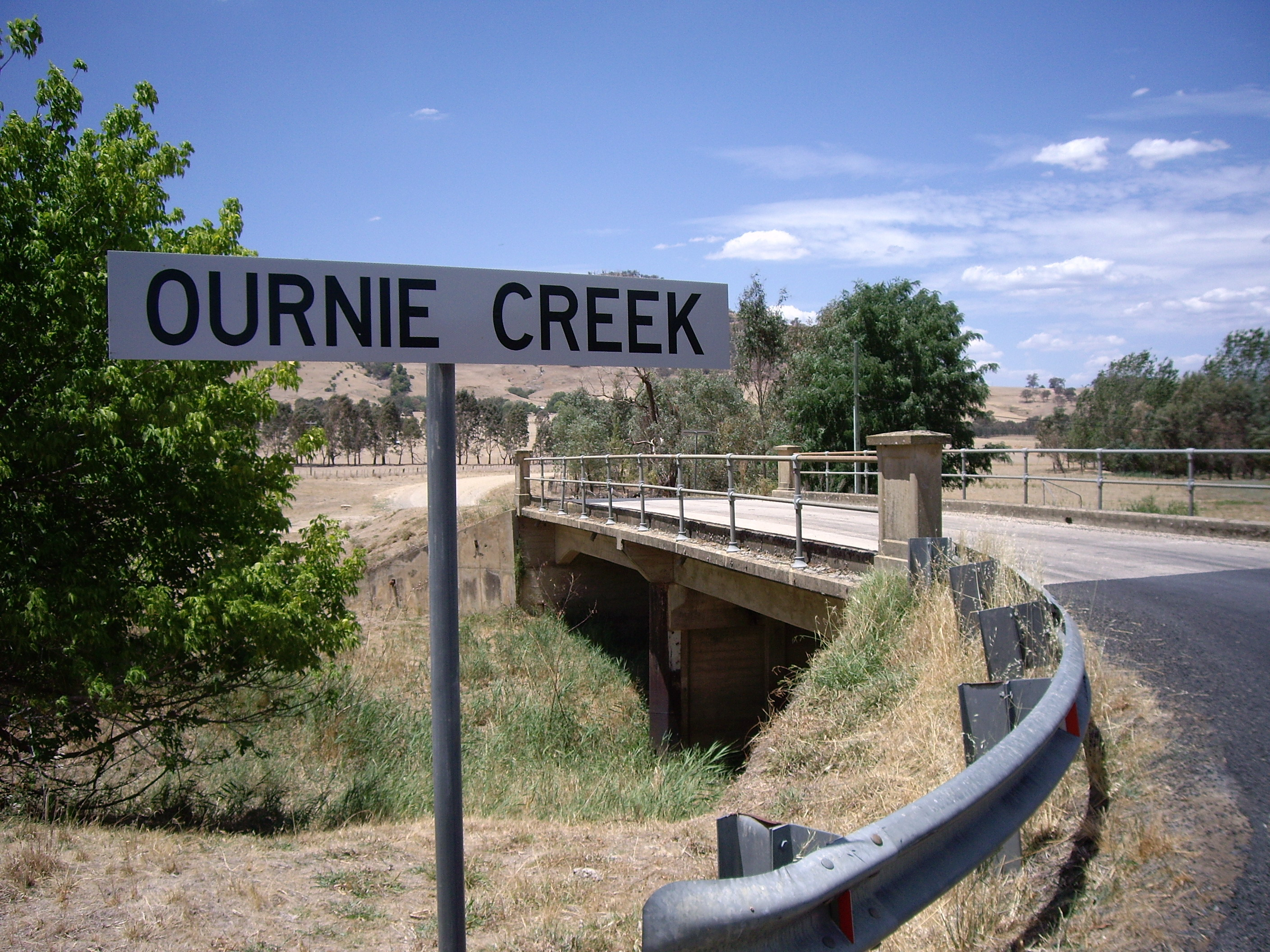
Ournie Creek
