= Paddys River (South West Slopes, New South Wales) =

Paddys River Cowra Creek
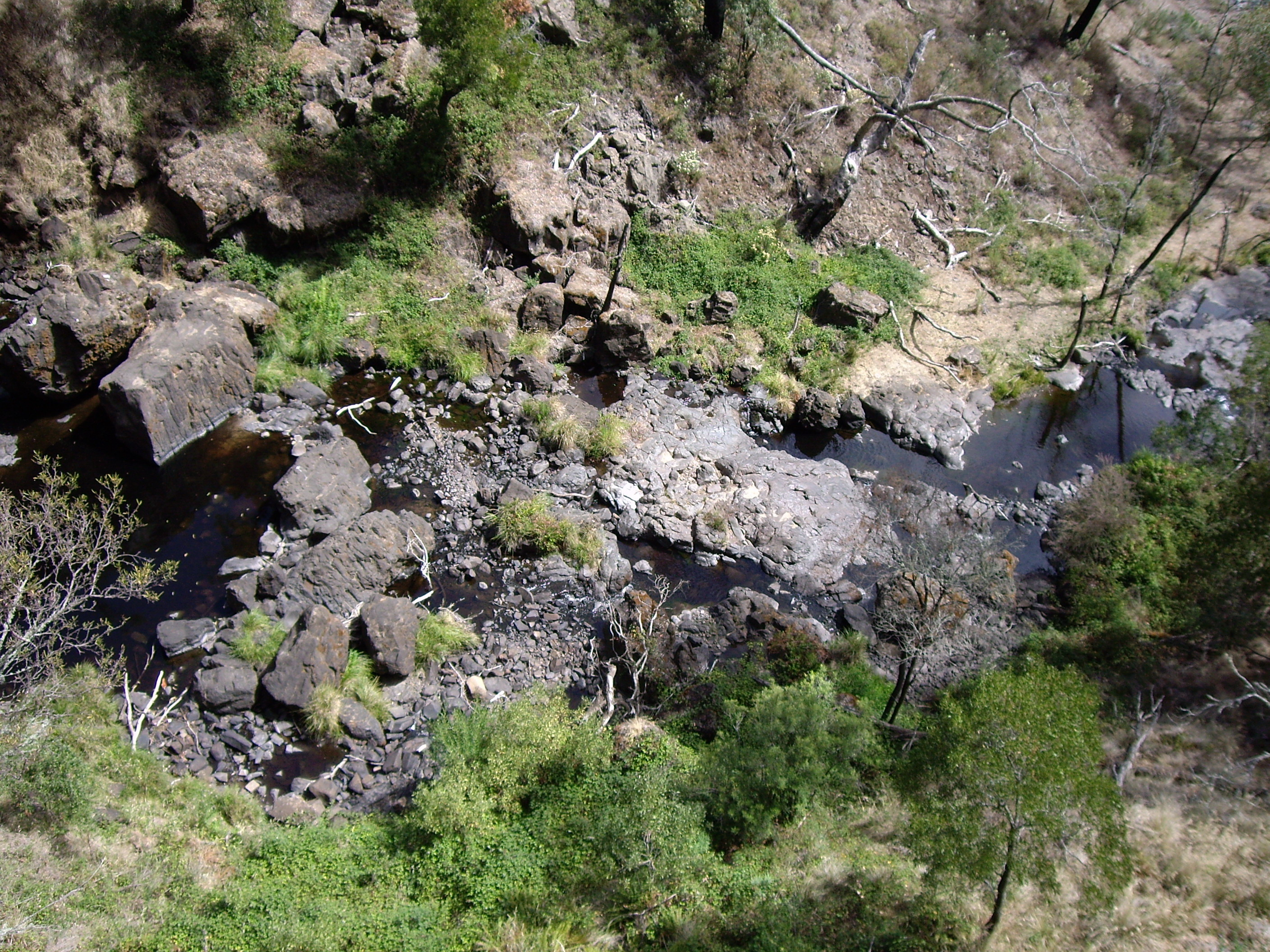
- Paddys River, located at the Paddys River Falls

- Location in New South Wales

Location
- Country: Australia
- State: New South Wales
- Region: IBRA: Australian Alps
- District: Snowy Mountains, South West Slopes
- Municipality: Tumbarumba

Physical characteristics
- Source: Snowy Mountains
  - location: east of Tumbarumba
  - elevation: 1,180 m (3,870 ft)
- Mouth: confluence with the Tumbarumba Creek
  - location: north of Tooma
  - coordinates: 35°49′22″S 148°10′49″E
  - elevation: 346 m (1,135 ft)
- Length: 31 km (19 mi)

Basin features
- River system: Murray River, Murray–Darling basin
- Waterbodies: Paddys River Dam
- Waterfalls: Paddys River Falls

Paddys River, a watercourse of the Murray catchment within the Murray–Darling basin, is located in the Australian Alpine region of New South Wales, Australia.

== Course and features ==
The river rises below Granite Mountain, east of Tumbarumba, on the western slopes of the Snowy Mountains within Bago State Forest, and its natural flow drains generally south, and then south-west, before reaching its confluence with the Tumbarumba Creek, north of the village of Tooma, descending 832 metres (2,730 ft) over its 31 kilometres (19 mi) course. The river is impounded by Paddys River Dam. Approximately 15 kilometres (9.3 mi) south of Tumbarumba, the river descends 18-metre (59 ft) over the Paddys River Falls.

== See also ==
- List of rivers of New South Wales (L–Z)
- Rivers of New South Wales
