= Maragle =

- Town
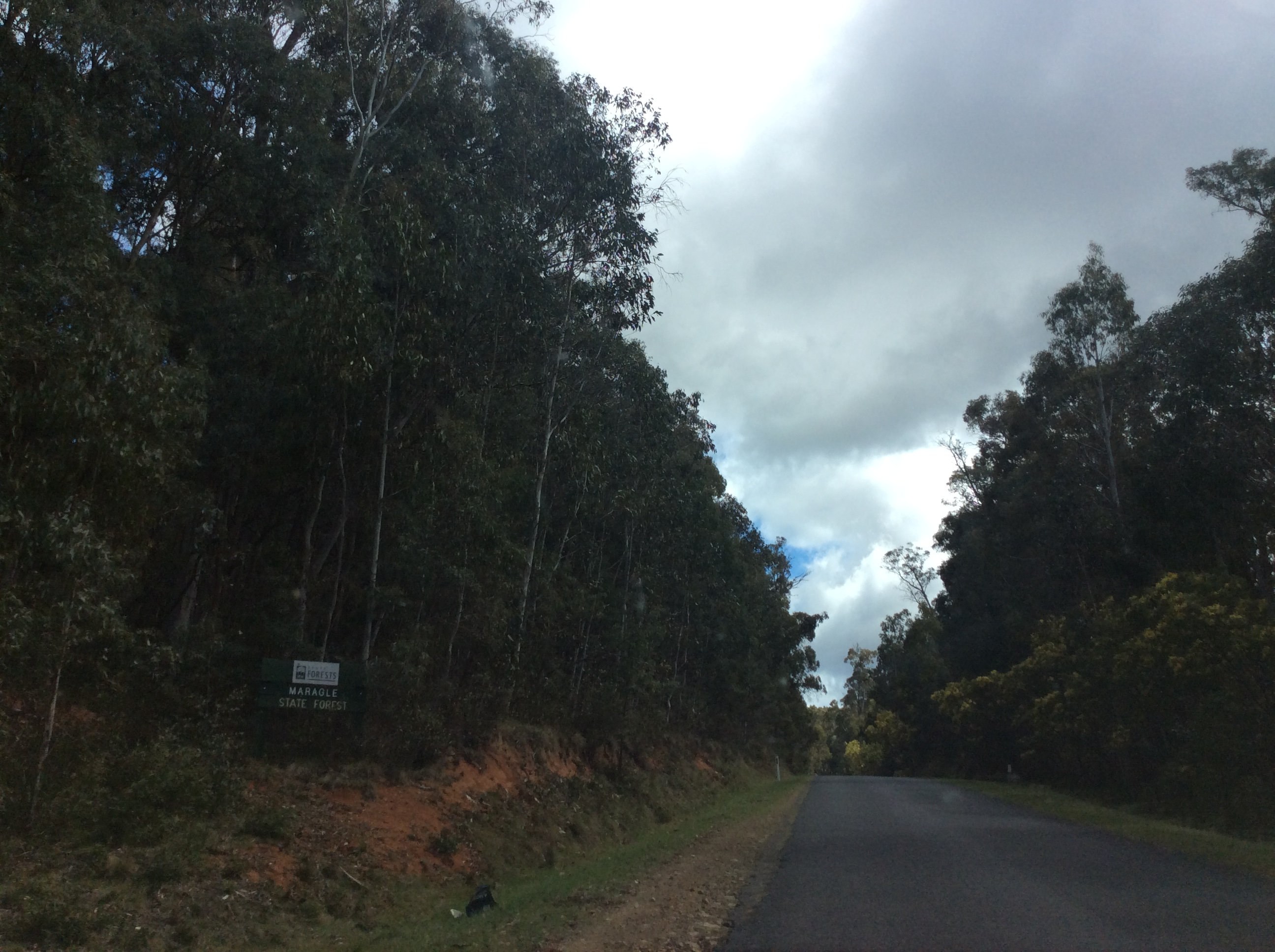
- Maragle State Forest along the Elliott Way, at an elevation of 1,200 metres (3,900 ft)

- Coordinates: 35°53′54″S 148°09′04″E
- Country: Australia
- State: New South Wales
- LGA: Snowy Valleys Council
- Location: 19 km (12 mi) ESE of Tumbarumba; 55 km (34 mi) NE of Corryong; 50 km (31 mi) WNW of Cabramurra

Government
  - State electorate: Albury
  - Federal division: Riverina
- Elevation: 420–1,375 m (1,378–4,511 ft)

Population
  - Total: 58 (2016 census)
- Postcode: 2653
- County: Selwyn
- Mean max temp: 16.4 °C (61.5 °F)
- Mean min temp: 7.9 °C (46.2 °F)
- Annual rainfall: 1,219.1 mm (48.00 in)

Maragle is a rural locality in the southeast part of the Riverina, situated approximately 22 kilometres (14 mi) west of Cabramurra as the crow flies, or 50 kilometres (31 mi) by road. The nearest towns are Tumbarumba 19 kilometres (12 mi) to the northwest, and Corryong 55 kilometres (34 mi) to the southwest. At the 2016 census, it had a population of 58.

== Geography ==
The region varies greatly in altitude, ranging from 420 metres (1,380 ft) at the valley floor near Tooma to 1,375 metres (4,511 ft) at Pilot Reef Mountain. State forest (chiefly Eucalyptus delegatensis and pinus radiata) as well as semi-cleared, undulating grazing land characterise the area.

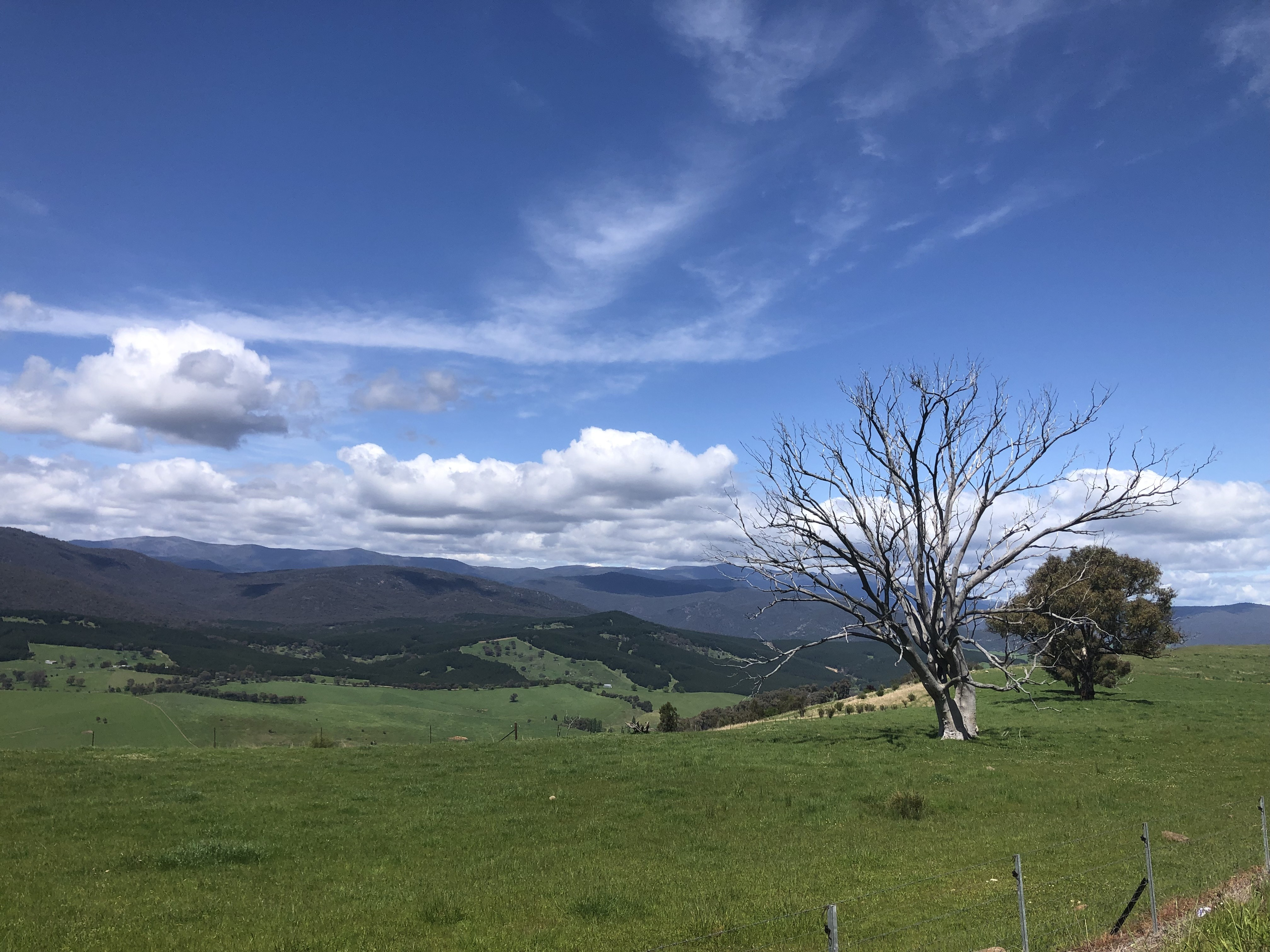
Characteristic 'emerald green' country of the Upper Murray valleys in springtime.

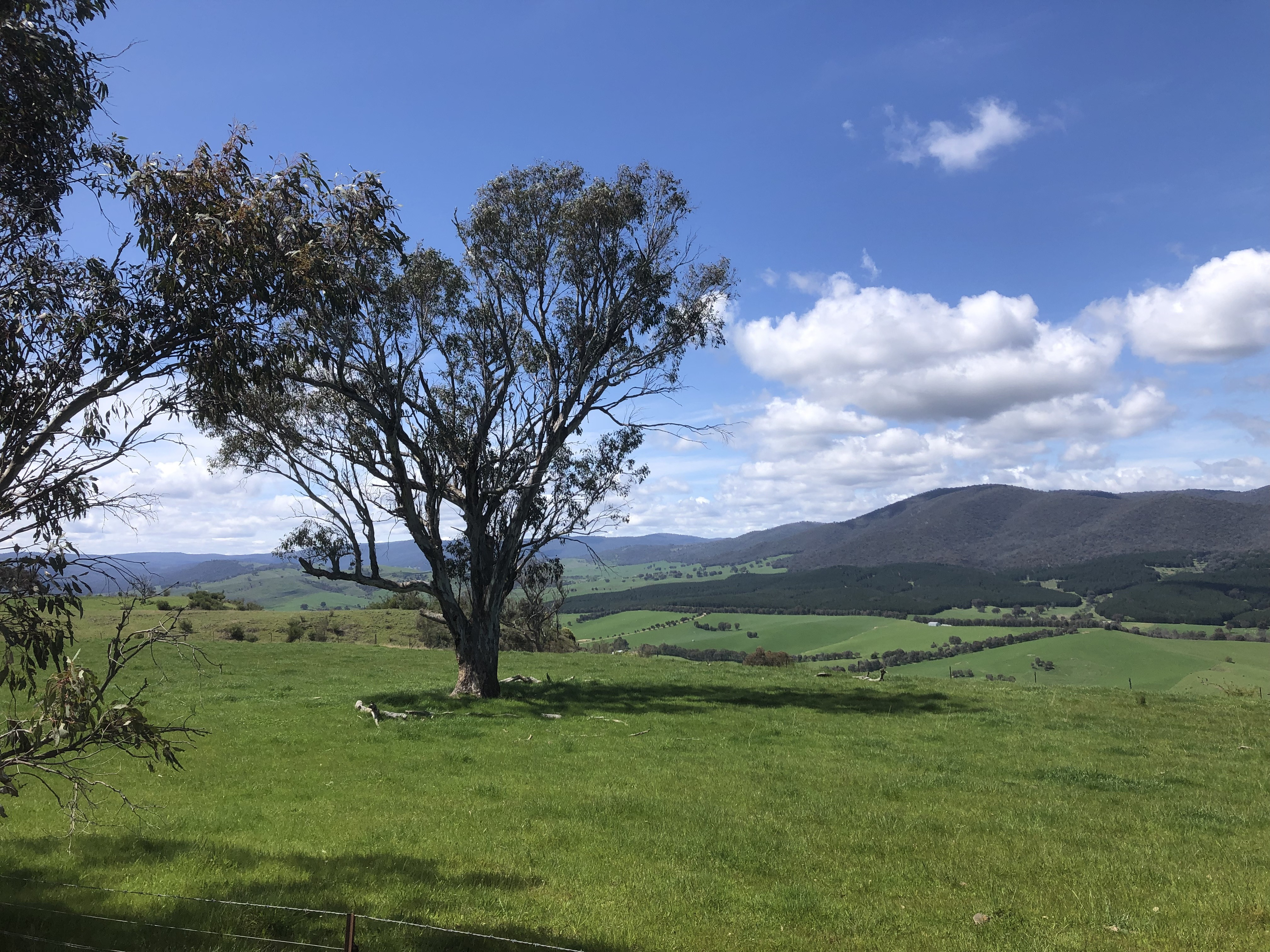

== Climate ==
The area has a temperate oceanic climate (Cfb) in a cold rainforest zone, with mild to warm summers and cold, wet winters. Although high summer to mid autumn is relatively dry, springs are characterised by frequent and severe thunderstorms. Sleet and graupel are very common occurrences throughout the year (at times even in early summer) and snow often falls heavily in the winter and spring months. Low, heavy cloud dominates the winter skies. Seasonal range is especially great about the maximum temperatures, from 26 °C (79 °F) in January to just 7 °C (45 °F) in July.

Climate data are sourced from an altitude of 981 metres (3,219 ft) at Hunters Hill across the border into Victoria, operating since 1993.

Climate data for Hunters Hill (1993–2023); 981 m AMSL; 36.21° S, 147.54° E
Month	Jan	Feb	Mar	Apr	May	Jun	Jul	Aug	Sep	Oct	Nov	Dec	Year
Record high °C (°F)	38.8 (101.8)	36.9 (98.4)	32.8 (91.0)	26.2 (79.2)	21.3 (70.3)	16.2 (61.2)	13.8 (56.8)	18.4 (65.1)	24.5 (76.1)	28.6 (83.5)	33.3 (91.9)	36.0 (96.8)	38.8 (101.8)
Mean daily maximum °C (°F)	26.1 (79.0)	25.1 (77.2)	21.7 (71.1)	16.5 (61.7)	11.7 (53.1)	8.4 (47.1)	7.4 (45.3)	9.0 (48.2)	12.3 (54.1)	16.2 (61.2)	19.9 (67.8)	22.8 (73.0)	16.4 (61.6)
Mean daily minimum °C (°F)	14.6 (58.3)	13.9 (57.0)	11.6 (52.9)	8.5 (47.3)	5.4 (41.7)	3.0 (37.4)	2.0 (35.6)	2.6 (36.7)	4.6 (40.3)	7.2 (45.0)	10.0 (50.0)	11.9 (53.4)	7.9 (46.3)
Record low °C (°F)	3.0 (37.4)	2.3 (36.1)	1.6 (34.9)	−0.3 (31.5)	−2.1 (28.2)	−2.2 (28.0)	−2.6 (27.3)	−3.1 (26.4)	−4.1 (24.6)	−1.4 (29.5)	−1.0 (30.2)	0.8 (33.4)	−4.1 (24.6)
Average precipitation mm (inches)	78.8 (3.10)	69.6 (2.74)	72.8 (2.87)	73.4 (2.89)	100.7 (3.96)	140.0 (5.51)	150.6 (5.93)	138.9 (5.47)	117.0 (4.61)	95.3 (3.75)	100.2 (3.94)	78.1 (3.07)	1,219.1 (48.00)
Average precipitation days (≥ 0.2 mm)	8.3	7.4	8.0	8.4	12.0	15.3	18.5	16.4	13.6	11.3	10.8	8.8	138.8
Average afternoon relative humidity (%)	43	47	48	58	73	82	80	74	68	58	52	46	61
Source: Australian Bureau of Meteorology; Hunters Hill
