= Welaregang =

- Town
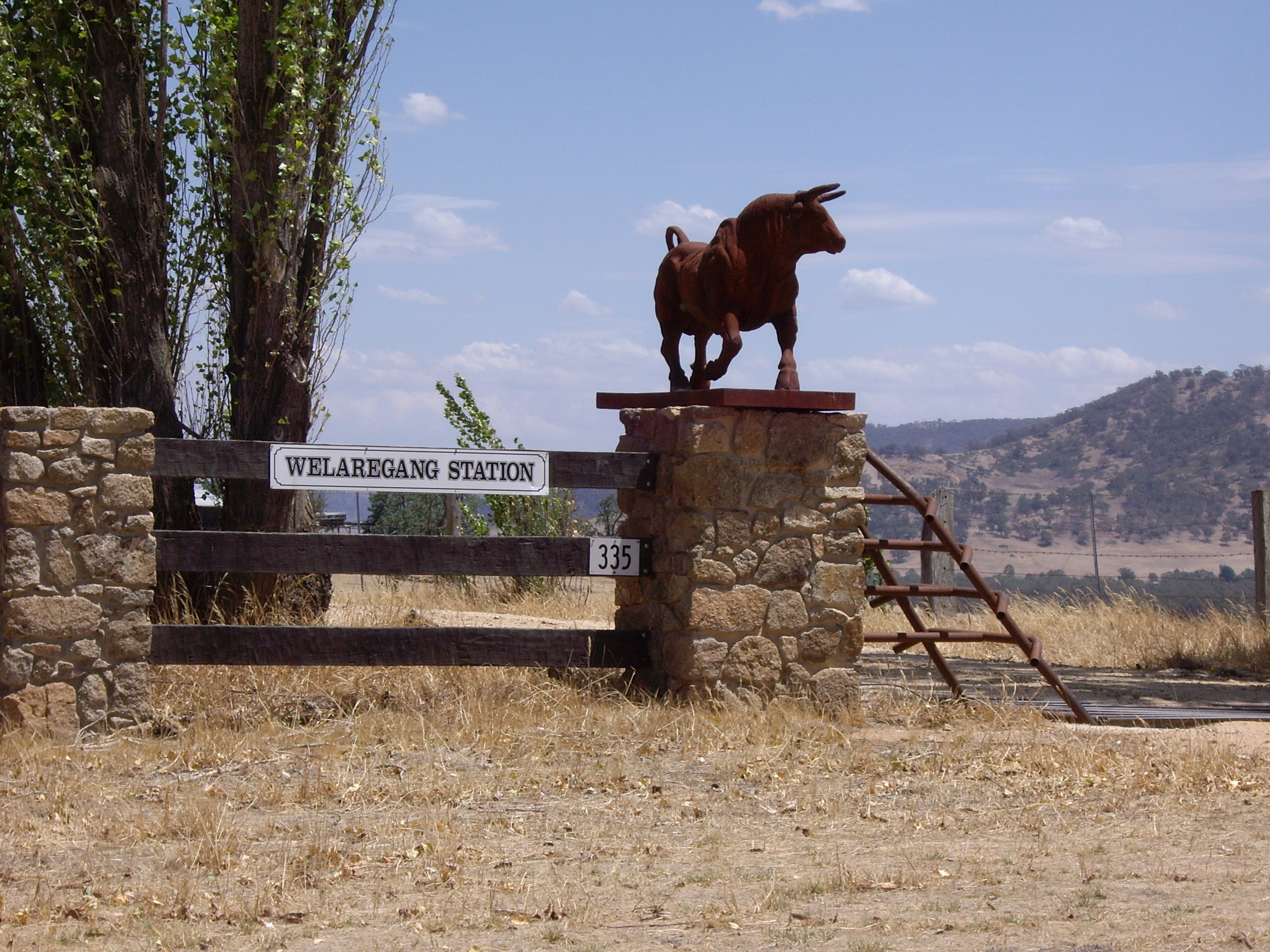
- Welaregang Station

- Coordinates: 36°01′S 147°58′E
- Country: Australia
- State: New South Wales
- Location: 11 km (6.8 mi) from Tooma; 15 km (9.3 mi) from Ournie

Government
  - State electorate: Albury
- Elevation: 310 m (1,020 ft)

Population
  - Total: 32 (2021 census)
- Postcode: 2642
- County: Selwyn

Welaregang is a rural community in the far south east part of the Riverina and situated about 11 kilometres south west from Tooma and 15 kilometres south east from Ournie. At the 2006 census, Welaregang had a population of 162.

The community area is named after the parish of Welaregang, and the nearby Welaregang Station also takes the name. There are numerous other grazing properties nearby. Welaregang is situated on the Ournie to Tooma road, a dirt track, and only 3 kilometres (1.9 mi) from the Murray River, the border with Victoria.

During the time that the Tooma District was considered as a proposed location for the national capital of Australia, the area around the village reserve at Welaregang was identified as a site for the city.

Welaregang Post Office opened on 1 January 1861 and closed in 1873.

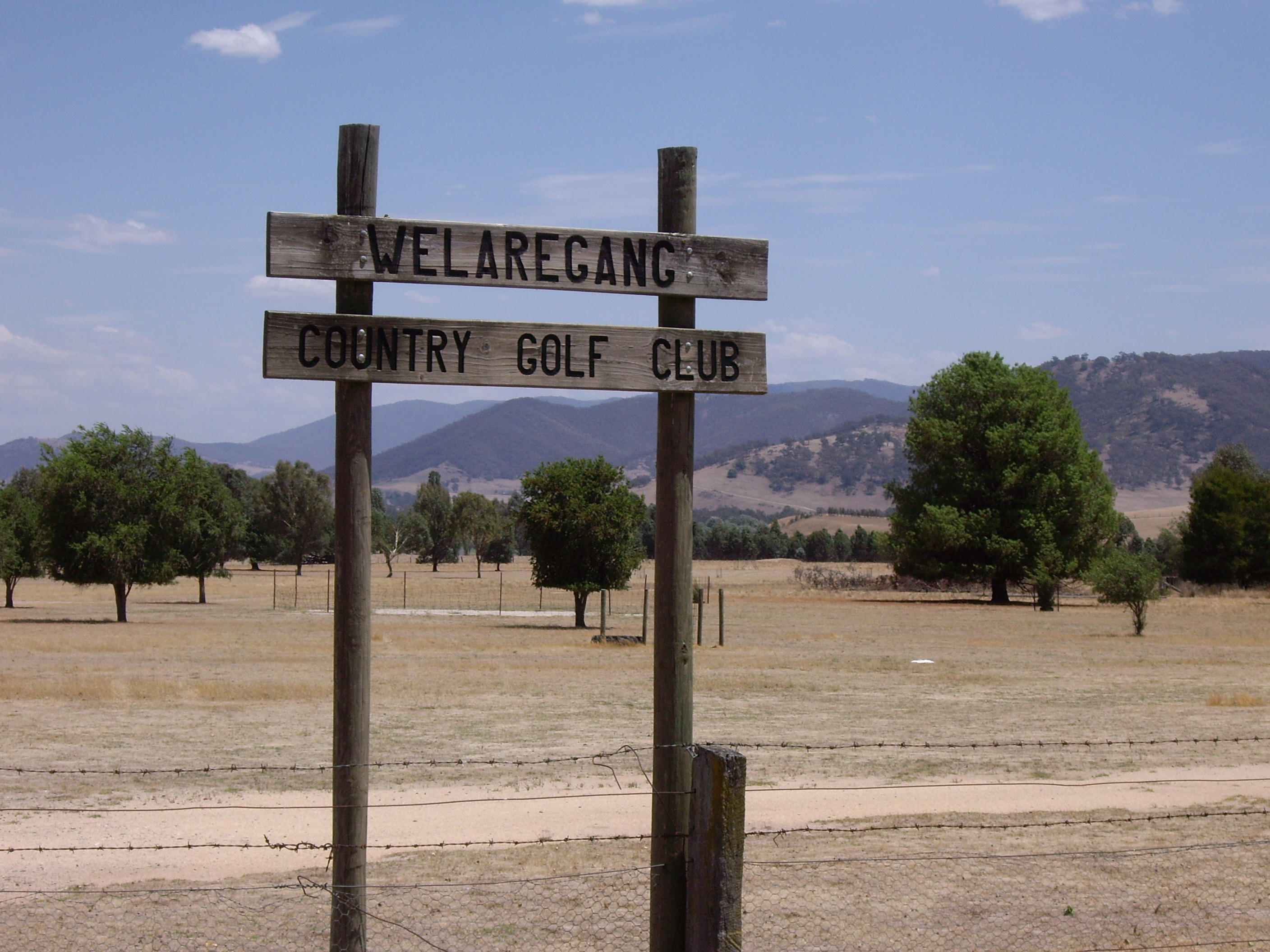
Welaregang Country Golf Club

The community has a Golf Club which is cut directly into the surrounding landscape.

== Notes and references ==
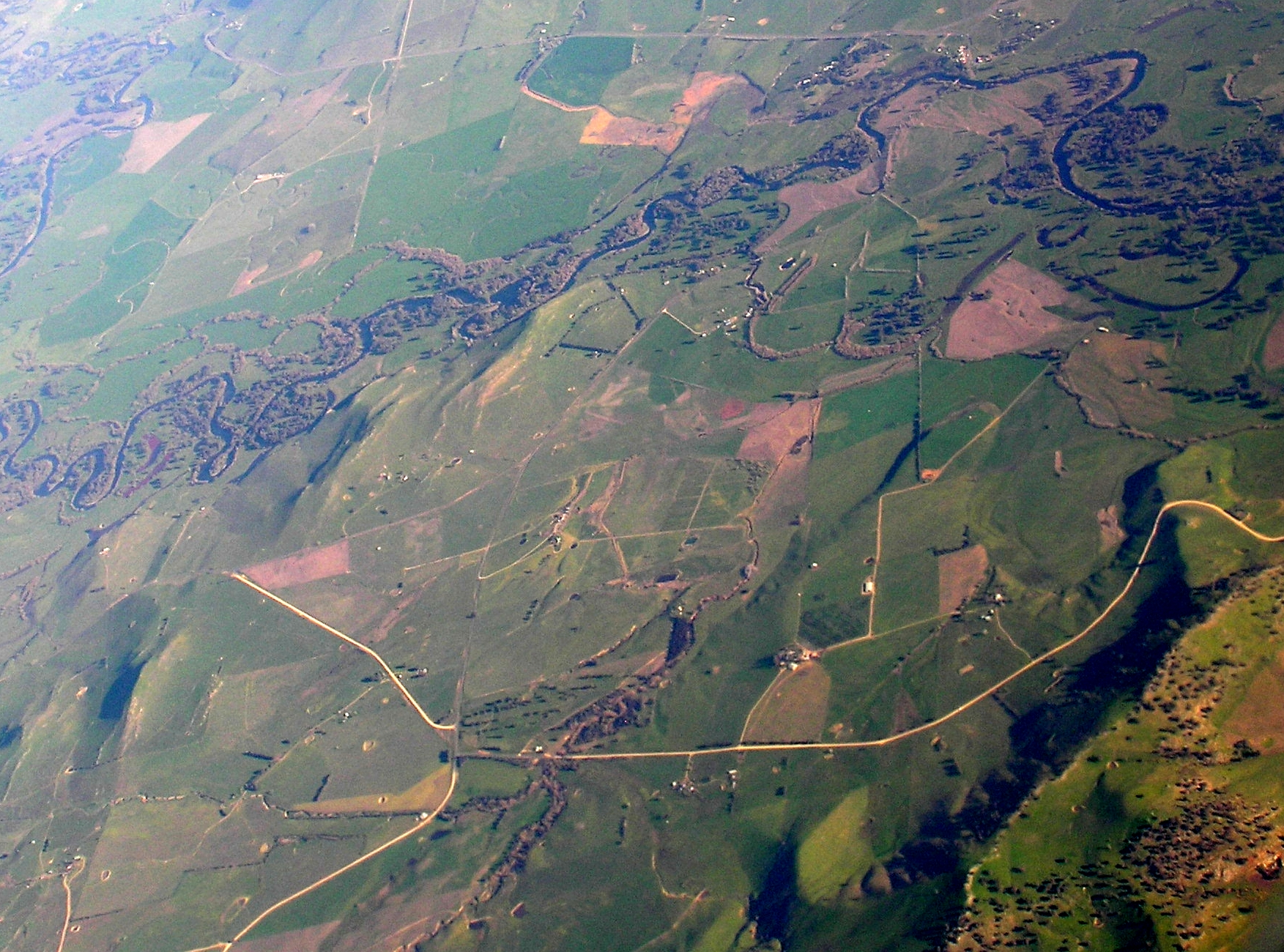
Aerial photo from north west
