= Laurel Hill, New South Wales =

Laurel Hill
- Town
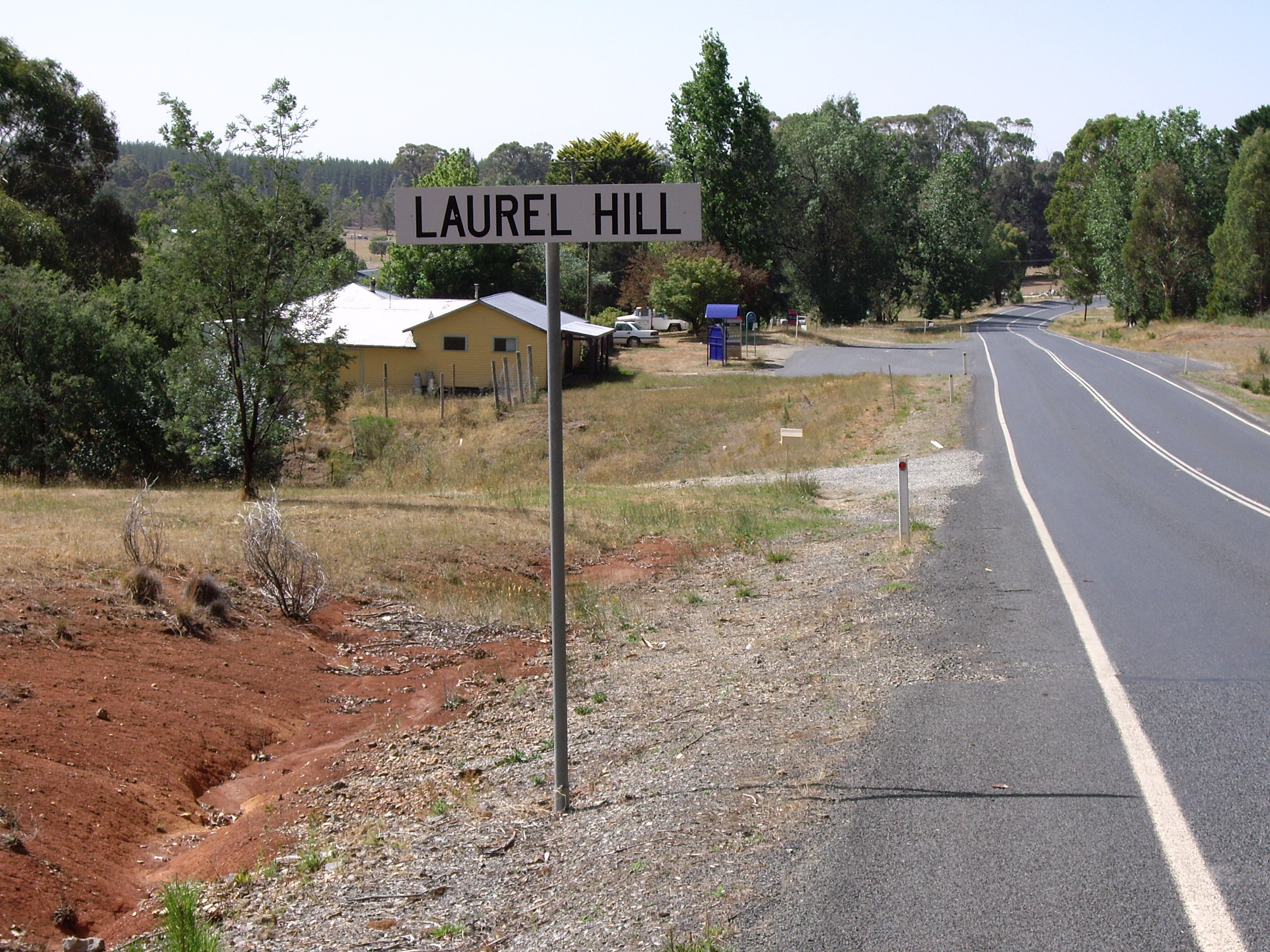
- Laurel Hill

- Coordinates: 35°36′01″S 148°05′35″E
- Country: Australia
- State: New South Wales
- LGA: Snowy Valleys Council
- Location: 14 km (8.7 mi) SSW of Batlow; 22 km (14 mi) NNE of Tumbarumba

Government
  - State electorate: Albury
- Elevation: 1,045 m (3,428 ft)

Population
  - Total: 21 (SAL 2021)
- Postcode: 2649
- County: Wynyard
- Mean max temp: 15.2 °C (59.4 °F)
- Mean min temp: 4.2 °C (39.6 °F)
- Annual rainfall: 1,413.5 mm (55.65 in)

Laurel Hill is a village community in the south east part of the Riverina, in New South Wales, Australia. It is situated by road, about 14 kilometres south-southwest of Batlow and 22 kilometres north-northeast of Tumbarumba.

In the late 1800s, gold mining was being carried out at a location about 12 km south of Batlow on the Paddy's River. This location, named Quartzville, was home at one point to about 2,000 people. A dam for the washing of alluvial gold and sluicing operations was constructed at the site. The population in the area extended into the Bago forest area and Laurel Hill came into being on the route taken by coaches from Adelong to Tumbarumba.

Bago Post Office opened on 10 June 1878, was renamed Laurel Hill in 1880 and closed in 1989.

The Miners Arms hotel at Laurel Hill was owned by the Waters family who held the licence until 1887, when it was taken over by Mr Dickson Currie. Mary Ann Waters took over the hotel as licensee in 1891 and Mr Currie built a new hotel for her in the early 1900s, as the old building had been condemned. The new hotel was located on the opposite side of the road to the original pub. Mr Jim Waters bought the new hotel in 1910 and operated it until 1928 when it was sold to a Mr Hayden. The hotel was later sold to Mr George King, who remodelled the building, altering the roof and enclosing the front verandah. Mr King later moved to Batlow and the hotel was taken over for a time by Mrs Latham, before she too moved to Batlow. The hotel building burned down in 1958 and was not replaced.

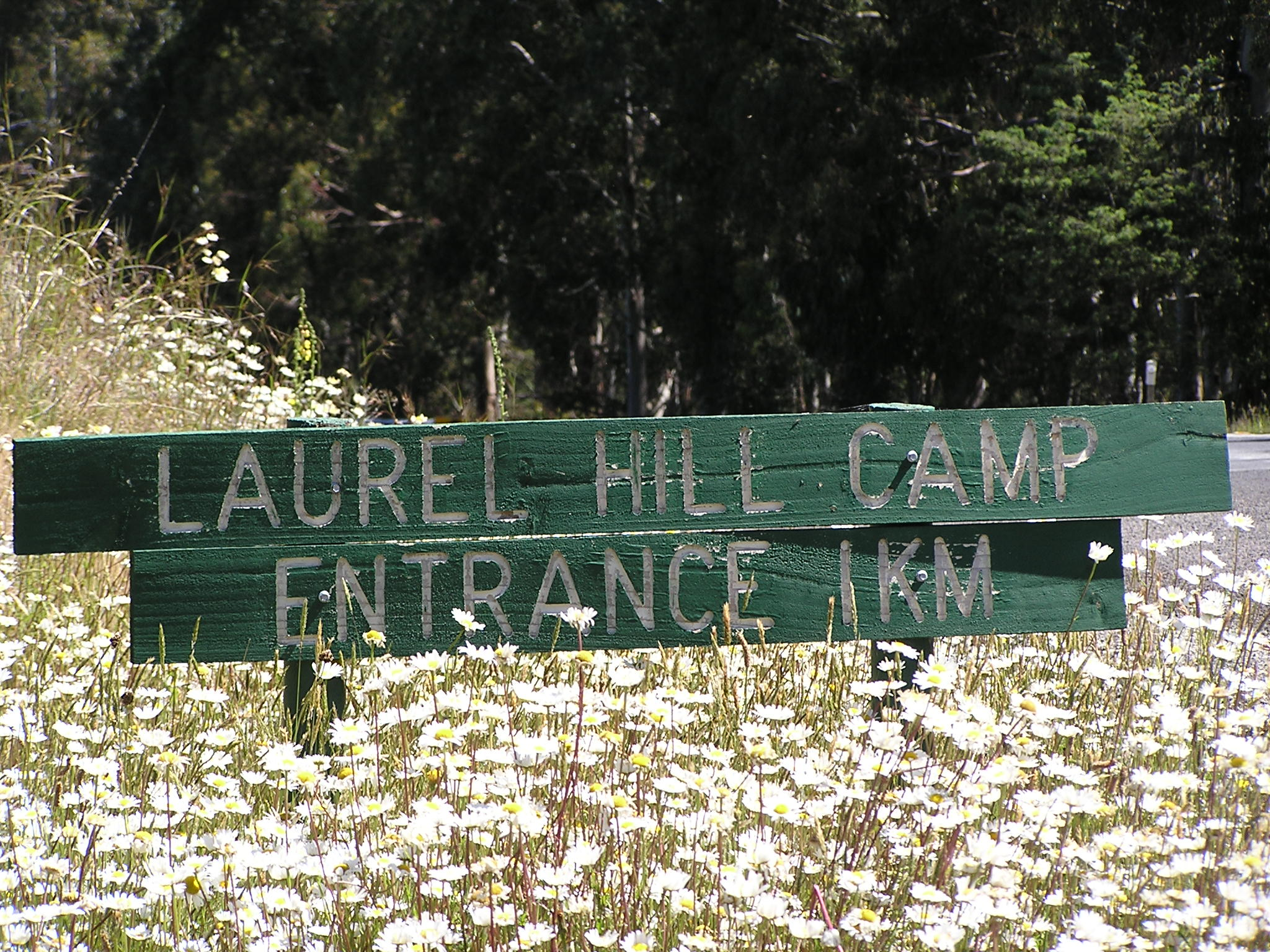
Sign for Laurel Hill Camp

Laurel Hill Prison Farm was established in 1957. It was renamed the Leslie Nott Afforestation Camp in 1958 and then the Laurel Hill Forest Camp, under the direction of the Forestry Commission of New South Wales. It is now a privately owned conference centre.

== Climate ==
The Bago Plateau, to the south of Batlow, has a considerably cooler and wetter climate owing to its great elevation and exposure. Snow is frequent from June to September, with heavy falls that can last for more than a week at a time in shaded areas, and can even occur in the late spring to early summer period on rare occasions. The region is subject to heavy cloud cover in the winter months.

Climate data are sourced from Pilot Hill, at an altitude of 1,128 metres (3,701 ft).

Climate data for Bago (Pilot Hill, 1921–1951, rainfall 1910–1951); 1,128 m AMSL; 35.62° S, 148.15° E
Month	Jan	Feb	Mar	Apr	May	Jun	Jul	Aug	Sep	Oct	Nov	Dec	Year
Mean daily maximum °C (°F)	23.5 (74.3)	23.3 (73.9)	20.7 (69.3)	15.3 (59.5)	11.1 (52.0)	7.8 (46.0)	6.6 (43.9)	7.9 (46.2)	11.5 (52.7)	14.8 (58.6)	18.4 (65.1)	22.0 (71.6)	15.2 (59.4)
Mean daily minimum °C (°F)	9.7 (49.5)	10.3 (50.5)	8.3 (46.9)	4.5 (40.1)	1.5 (34.7)	−0.4 (31.3)	−1.4 (29.5)	−0.7 (30.7)	1.3 (34.3)	3.3 (37.9)	6.1 (43.0)	8.3 (46.9)	4.2 (39.6)
Average precipitation mm (inches)	74.1 (2.92)	75.5 (2.97)	100.8 (3.97)	102.0 (4.02)	124.1 (4.89)	166.7 (6.56)	171.3 (6.74)	158.1 (6.22)	131.0 (5.16)	132.5 (5.22)	97.4 (3.83)	80.0 (3.15)	1,413.5 (55.65)
Average precipitation days (≥ 0.2 mm)	6.1	5.7	6.7	6.6	8.0	12.4	11.7	13.9	11.9	10.5	7.7	7.3	108.5
Source: Australian Bureau of Meteorology; Bago (Pilot Hill)
