= Tooma Dam =

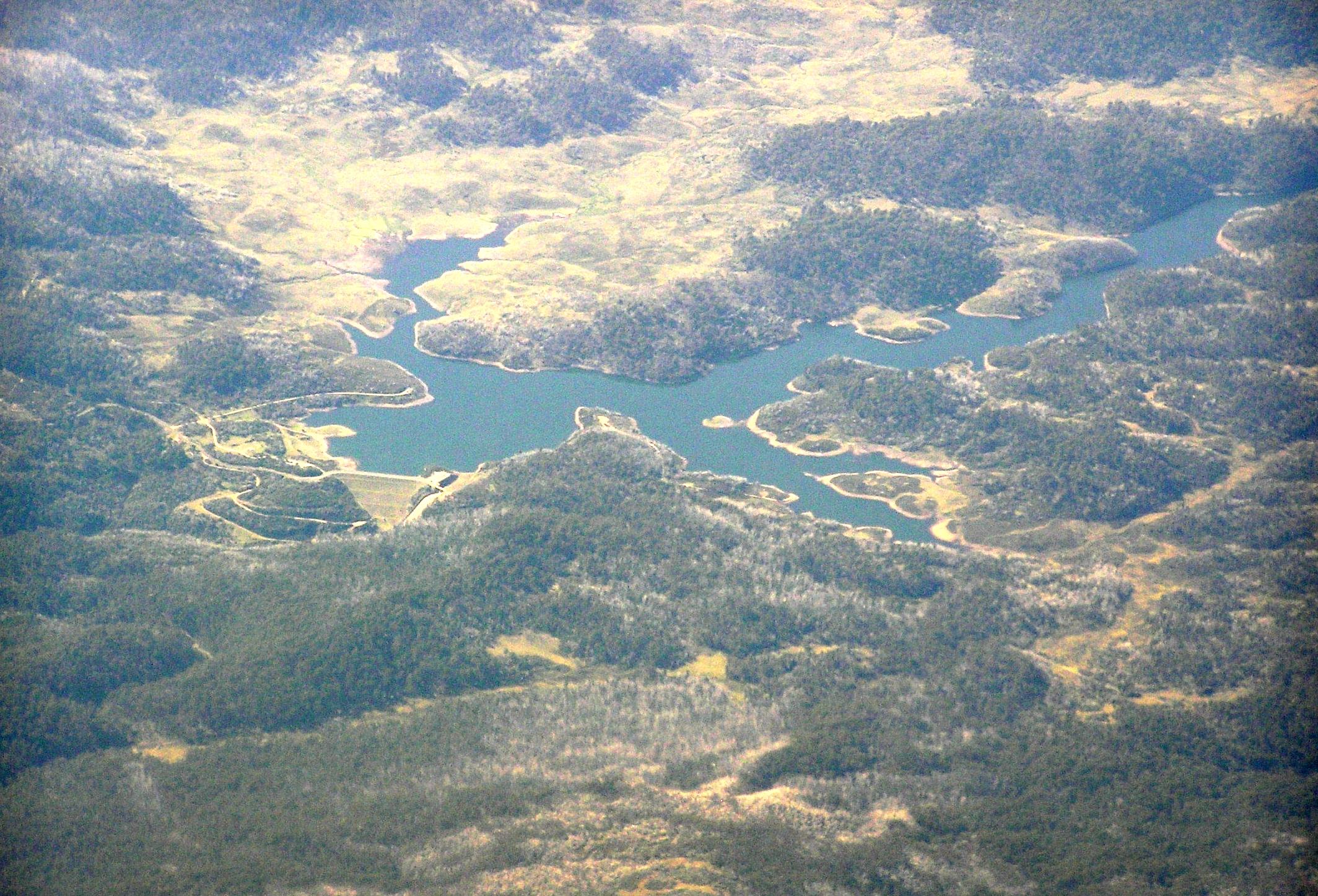
- Aerial view over Tooma Dam and Reservoir, 2009.

- Location of Tooma Dam in New South Wales
- Country: Australia
- Location: Snowy Mountains, New South Wales
- Coordinates: 36°03′03.4″S 148°16′30.5″E
- Status: Operational
- Opening date: 1961
- Owner: Snowy Hydro

Dam and spillways
- Type of dam: Embankment dam
- Impounds: Tooma River
- Height: 67 metres (220 ft)
- Length: 305 metres (1,001 ft)
- Dam volume: 1,111,000 cubic metres (39,200,000 cu ft)
- Spillways: 1
- Spillway capacity: 1,246 cubic metres per second (44,000 cu ft/s)

Reservoir
- Creates: Tooma Reservoir
- Total capacity: 28,124 megalitres (993.2×10^{6} cu ft)
- Catchment area: 152 square kilometres (59 sq mi)
- Surface area: 180 hectares (440 acres)
- Maximum water depth: 12 metres (39 ft)
- Normal elevation: 1,209 metres (3,967 ft) AHD

Tooma Dam is a major ungated earthen embankment dam across the Tooma River in the Snowy Mountains of New South Wales, Australia. The dam's main purpose is for the generation of hydro-power and is one of the sixteen major dams that comprise the Snowy Mountains Scheme, a vast hydroelectricity and irrigation complex constructed in south-east Australia between 1949 and 1974 and now run by Snowy Hydro.

The impounded reservoir is called the Tooma Reservoir.

== Location and features ==
Completed by Theiss Brothers in 1961, Tooma Dam is a major dam, located near the village of Tooma and approximately 21 kilometres (13 mi) from the town of Khancoban. The dam was constructed by Societe Dumez based on engineering plans developed under contract by the Snowy Mountains Hydroelectric Authority. Construction of the dam did not flood any towns or villages as it did in at Talbingo.

The dam wall comprising 111,100 cubic metres (3,920,000 cu ft) of concrete is 67 metres (220 ft) high and 305 metres (1,001 ft) long. At 100% capacity the dam wall holds back 28,124 megalitres (993.2×10^{6} cu ft) of water. The surface area of Tooma Reservoir is 180 hectares (440 acres) and the catchment area is 152 square kilometres (59 sq mi). The spillway is capable of discharging 1,246 cubic metres per second (44,000 cu ft/s).

The water behind the dam is diverted to Tumut Pond by the Tooma-Tumut tunnel, for power generation in the Tumut Hydroelectric Power Stations. This flow is supplemented by an intake shaft at Deep Creek Dam and three other creek diversions.

== Recreation ==
Tooma Reservoir is a popular alpine fishing location; and holds both Brown and Rainbow trout. Camping is permitted in the Clover Flat Camping area. Campers are encouraged to carry their own water supplies.

== See also ==
- List of dams and reservoirs in New South Wales
- Snowy Hydro Limited
- Snowy Mountains Scheme
