= Lake Tooma =

Lake in Estonia

- Tooma järv (Estonian)
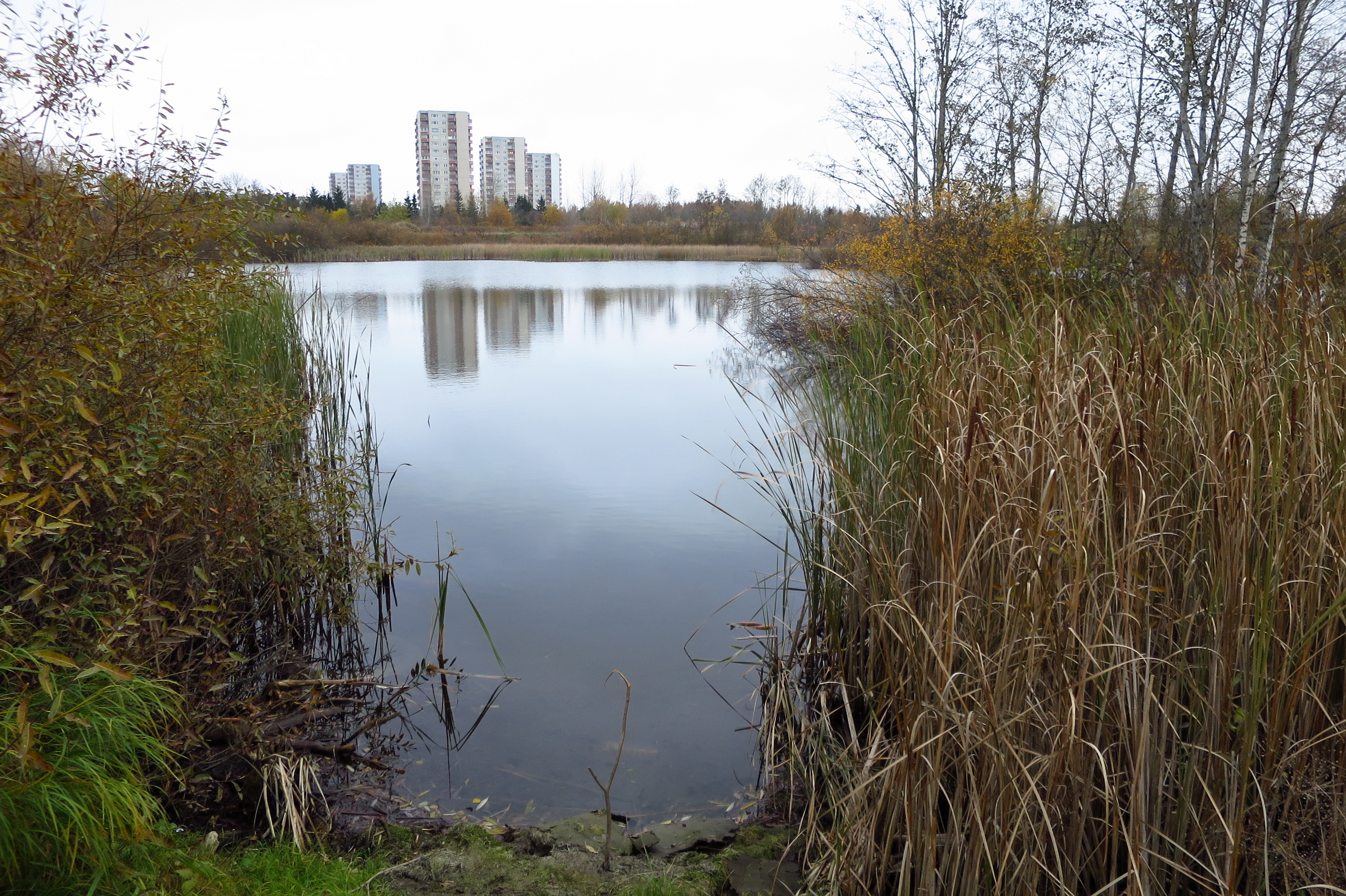

- Location within Estonia
- Coordinates: 59.4400°N 24.9022°E
- Basin countries: Estonia
- Max. length: 170 meters (560 ft)
- Surface area: 1.5 hectares (3.7 acres)
- Shore length^{1}: 620 meters (2,030 ft)
- Surface elevation: 34.5 meters (113 ft)
- Islands: 2
- ^{1} Shore length is not a well-defined measure.

Lake Tooma (Estonian: Tooma järv) is a lake in Estonia. It is located in the Lasnamäe district of the capital, Tallinn.

== Physical description ==
The lake has an area of 1.5 hectares (3.7 acres), and it has two islands with a combined area of 0.02 hectares (0.049 acres). It is 170 meters (560 ft) long, and its shoreline measures 620 meters (2,030 ft).

== See also ==
- List of lakes of Estonia
