= Tooma River =

River in New South Wales, Australia

Coordinates: 36°04′S 148°00′E

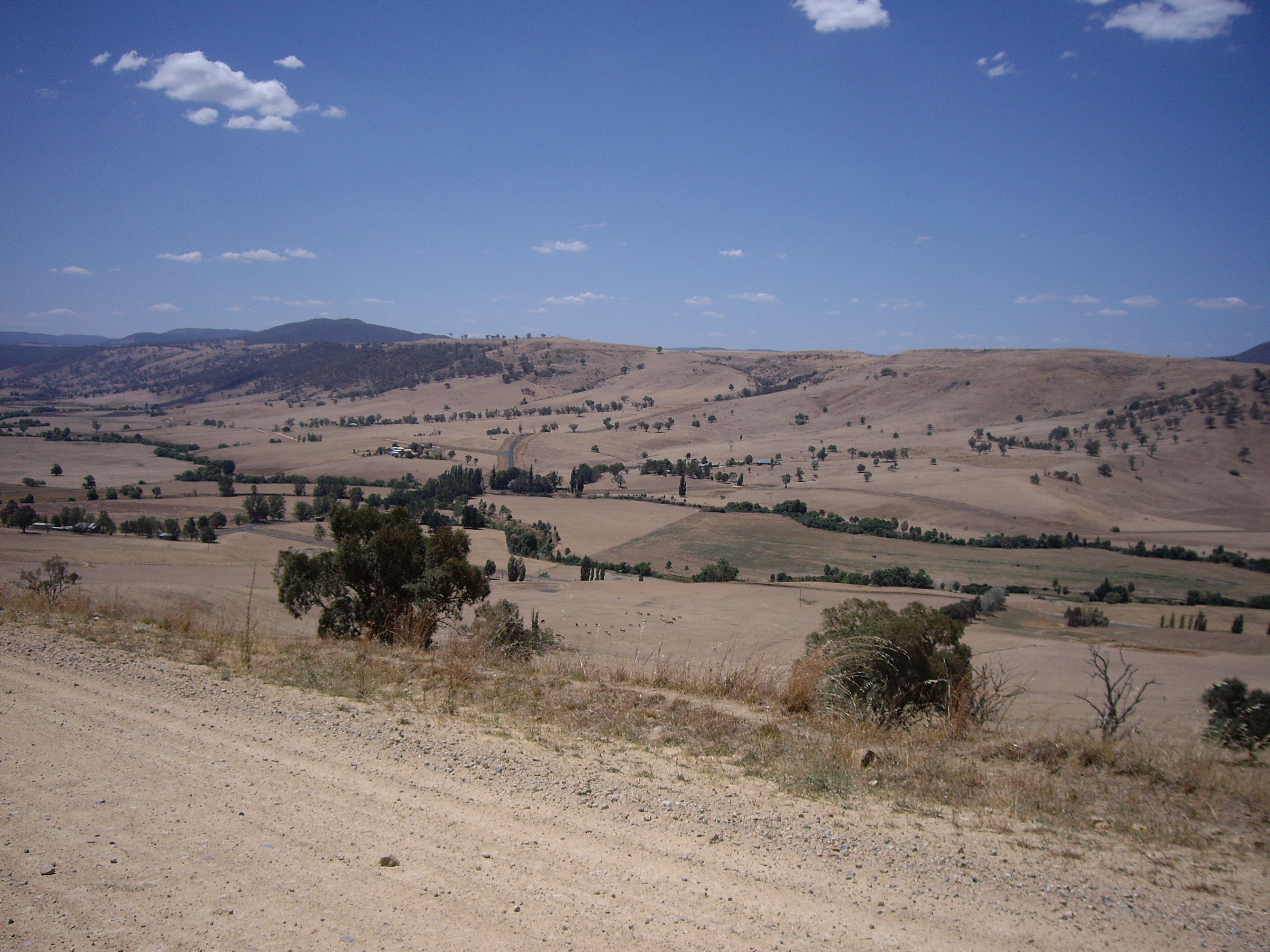
- Overlooking Tooma River from Ardenside Road, Tooma

Location
- Country: Australia
- State: New South Wales and Victoria
- Region: IBRA: Australian Alps, Snowy Mountains, and Victorian Alps
- Local government areas: Tumbarumba and Towong

Physical characteristics
- Source: Snowy Mountains
  - location: Mount Jagungal, New South Wales
  - elevation: 1,590 m (5,220 ft)
- Mouth: confluence with the Murray River
  - location: near Tintaldra, Victoria
  - elevation: 236 m (774 ft)
- Length: 74 km (46 mi)

Basin features
- River system: Murray River, Murray–Darling basin
- Tributaries
  - left: Bulls Head Creek; Broadway Creek; Little River; Yellow Bog Creek; Taylors Creek
  - right: Pugilistic Creek; Hell Hole Creek; Tumbarumba Creek
- Reservoir: Tooma Reservoir

Tooma River, a perennial stream that has had some of its flow diverted as a result of the Snowy Mountains Scheme, is part of the Murray catchment within the Murray–Darling basin, in the Australian Alpine region of New South Wales, Australia.

== Course and features ==
The river rises near Mount Jagungal on the western slopes of the Snowy Mountains and its natural flow drains generally north, then west before turning south, joined by eight tributaries including the Tumbarumba Creek, and reaching its confluence with the Murray River between the villages of Tooma and Tintaldra, descending 1,350 metres (4,430 ft) over its 74 kilometres (46 mi) course.

The Tooma Reservoir, part of the Snowy Mountains Scheme, captures water in the headwaters of the Tooma River, and diverts some of the water to the Tumut Pondage on the Tumut River, where the water is used to generate electricity in the sequence of hydro-electric power stations along the length of the Tumut River. This diversion results in a transfer of water from the Murray River catchment (which includes the Tooma River), to the Murrumbidgee River catchment (which includes the Tumut River). However, a compensating opposite transfer from the Murrumbidgee to the Murray basins is made using a different part of the Snowy Mountains Scheme.

== See also ==
- List of rivers of New South Wales (L–Z)
- List of rivers of Australia
- Snowy Mountains
- Rivers of New South Wales
