= Toomas Paur =

Estonian politician (born 1949)

Toomas Paur (born 17 March 1949 in Võru) is an Estonian politician. He was a member of the XIII Riigikogu.

He is a member of Estonian Centre Party.
