= Tooma, New South Wales =

Tooma
- Town
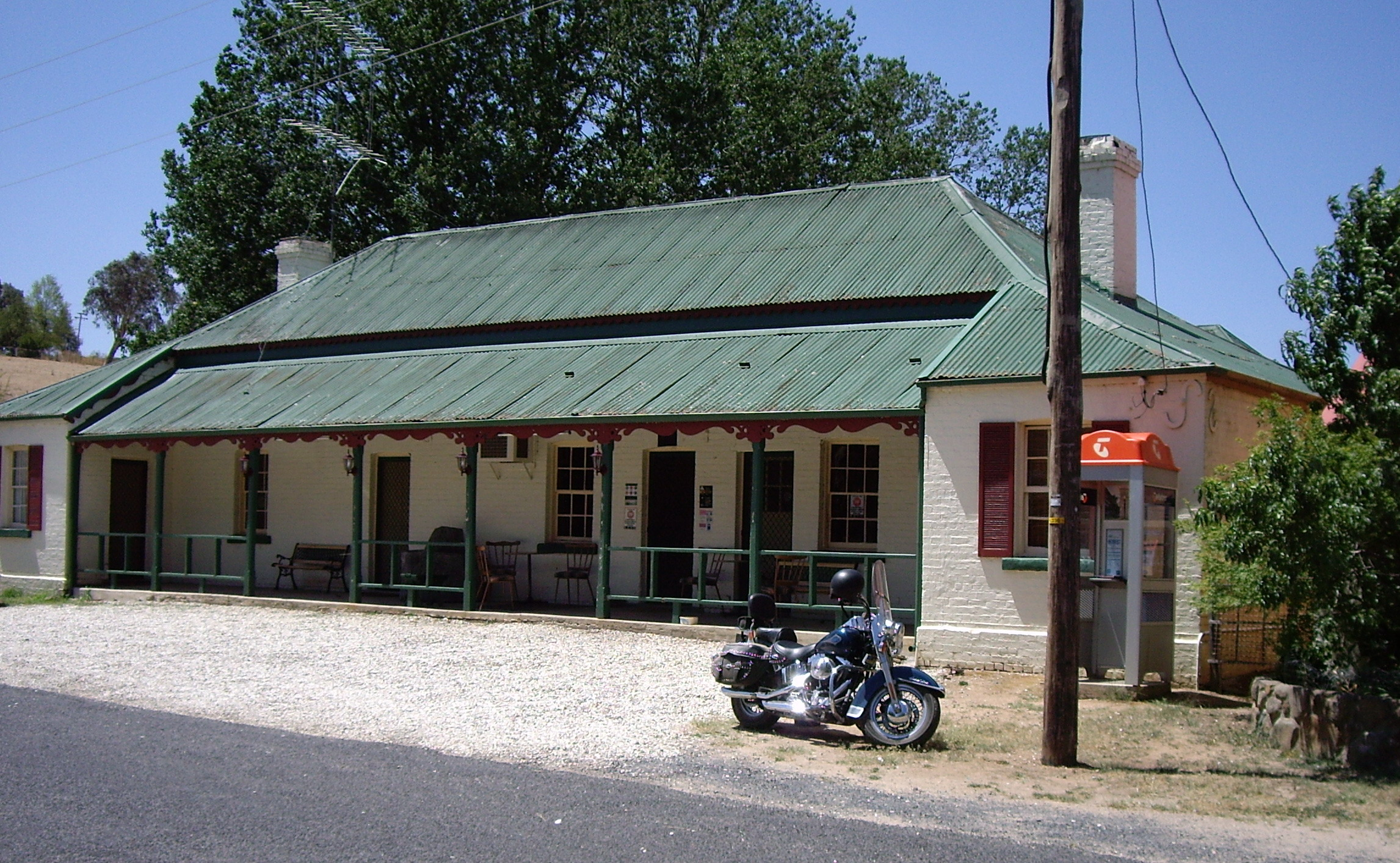
- The It's Not a Tooma Inn aka The Three Stags Inn

- Coordinates: 35°58′17.5″S 148°3′3.6″E
- Country: Australia
- State: New South Wales
- LGA: Snowy Valleys Council
- Location: 11 km (6.8 mi) from Welaregang; 34 km (21 mi) from Tumbarumba

Government
  - State electorate: Albury
  - Federal division: Riverina
- Elevation: 331 m (1,086 ft)

Population
  - Total: 104 (2016 census)
- Postcode: 2642
- County: Selwyn
- Mean max temp: 20.5 °C (68.9 °F)
- Mean min temp: 7.0 °C (44.6 °F)
- Annual rainfall: 963.5 mm (37.93 in)

Tooma is a locality and village community in the Snowy Valleys Council local government area, in the eastern part of the Riverina region of New South Wales.

== Location ==
Tooma is in the valley of the Tooma River, not far from its confluence with the Murray River. The village is adjacent to Tumbarumba Creek, a tributary of the Tooma River. It is about 11 kilometres (6.8 mi) east of Welaregang and 34 kilometres (21 mi) south of Tumbarumba.

== History ==
Tooma Post Office opened on 1 January 1873. A school opened in Tooma in February 1876 and closed in August 1980.

The Tooma District was one of ten locations that were shortlisted for the site of Australia's national capital in 1900. It was one of the last to be eliminated. In the final series of parliamentary ballots in October 1908, Tooma was one of the eleven sites in contention, and it survived until the eighth of the nine ballots, after which only Dalgety and the eventual capital site Canberra remained in contention. The site for the city was identified as being at nearby Welaregang.

== Climate ==
Climate data for Tooma are sourced at nearby Khancoban of approximately the same altitude. Summers are hot and dry, winters cool and rainy with occasional snowfalls.

Climate data for Khancoban SMHEA (1961–1994); 337 m AMSL; 36.23° S, 148.14° E
Month	Jan	Feb	Mar	Apr	May	Jun	Jul	Aug	Sep	Oct	Nov	Dec	Year
Record high °C (°F)	41.7 (107.1)	41.7 (107.1)	37.6 (99.7)	34.4 (93.9)	26.4 (79.5)	20.0 (68.0)	19.5 (67.1)	23.3 (73.9)	28.3 (82.9)	30.8 (87.4)	38.5 (101.3)	39.1 (102.4)	41.7 (107.1)
Mean daily maximum °C (°F)	29.7 (85.5)	29.7 (85.5)	26.4 (79.5)	21.2 (70.2)	15.7 (60.3)	11.6 (52.9)	11.0 (51.8)	13.1 (55.6)	16.3 (61.3)	20.2 (68.4)	23.7 (74.7)	27.0 (80.6)	20.5 (68.9)
Mean daily minimum °C (°F)	12.8 (55.0)	13.0 (55.4)	10.4 (50.7)	7.0 (44.6)	4.2 (39.6)	1.8 (35.2)	1.3 (34.3)	2.6 (36.7)	4.4 (39.9)	6.8 (44.2)	8.9 (48.0)	11.3 (52.3)	7.0 (44.7)
Record low °C (°F)	1.8 (35.2)	3.5 (38.3)	−0.6 (30.9)	−2.4 (27.7)	−4.1 (24.6)	−8.0 (17.6)	−6.4 (20.5)	−5.6 (21.9)	−3.9 (25.0)	−1.8 (28.8)	−0.4 (31.3)	1.1 (34.0)	−8.0 (17.6)
Average precipitation mm (inches)	59.8 (2.35)	53.0 (2.09)	56.0 (2.20)	63.3 (2.49)	80.6 (3.17)	84.9 (3.34)	100.9 (3.97)	112.9 (4.44)	97.9 (3.85)	96.8 (3.81)	81.7 (3.22)	75.7 (2.98)	963.5 (37.91)
Average precipitation days (≥ 0.2 mm)	7.4	7.1	7.1	9.0	11.9	14.7	15.9	16.0	14.5	12.4	10.7	9.2	135.9
Average afternoon relative humidity (%)	34	34	37	48	61	71	68	59	55	48	43	42	50
Mean monthly sunshine hours	303.8	268.4	257.3	210.0	145.7	99.0	108.5	136.4	177.0	235.6	261.0	269.7	2,472.4
Source: Australian Bureau of Meteorology; Khancoban SMHEA

Climate data for Khancoban AWS (1997–2022); 339 m AMSL; 36.23° S, 148.14° E
Month	Jan	Feb	Mar	Apr	May	Jun	Jul	Aug	Sep	Oct	Nov	Dec	Year
Record high °C (°F)	43.3 (109.9)	43.3 (109.9)	38.0 (100.4)	32.5 (90.5)	25.4 (77.7)	20.0 (68.0)	19.0 (66.2)	22.1 (71.8)	28.0 (82.4)	33.8 (92.8)	38.0 (100.4)	41.1 (106.0)	43.3 (109.9)
Mean daily maximum °C (°F)	31.7 (89.1)	30.3 (86.5)	27.0 (80.6)	21.7 (71.1)	16.0 (60.8)	12.2 (54.0)	11.7 (53.1)	13.6 (56.5)	17.2 (63.0)	21.0 (69.8)	25.0 (77.0)	28.4 (83.1)	21.3 (70.4)
Mean daily minimum °C (°F)	13.7 (56.7)	13.3 (55.9)	10.7 (51.3)	7.3 (45.1)	4.2 (39.6)	2.2 (36.0)	1.7 (35.1)	2.7 (36.9)	4.6 (40.3)	6.6 (43.9)	9.5 (49.1)	11.3 (52.3)	7.3 (45.2)
Record low °C (°F)	4.0 (39.2)	3.0 (37.4)	−2.0 (28.4)	−1.4 (29.5)	−4.0 (24.8)	−4.2 (24.4)	−4.6 (23.7)	−5.0 (23.0)	−7.0 (19.4)	−1.3 (29.7)	0.0 (32.0)	2.2 (36.0)	−7.0 (19.4)
Average precipitation mm (inches)	60.0 (2.36)	60.2 (2.37)	63.2 (2.49)	57.3 (2.26)	68.7 (2.70)	95.8 (3.77)	89.0 (3.50)	106.5 (4.19)	88.6 (3.49)	80.4 (3.17)	92.2 (3.63)	74.6 (2.94)	936.5 (36.87)
Average precipitation days (≥ 0.2 mm)	7.7	7.9	8.5	8.8	14.6	19.6	20.2	18.3	14.2	11.8	11.1	9.3	152.0
Average afternoon relative humidity (%)	31	33	34	43	57	69	69	61	55	49	43	35	48
Source: Australian Bureau of Meteorology; Khancoban AWS

== Gallery ==
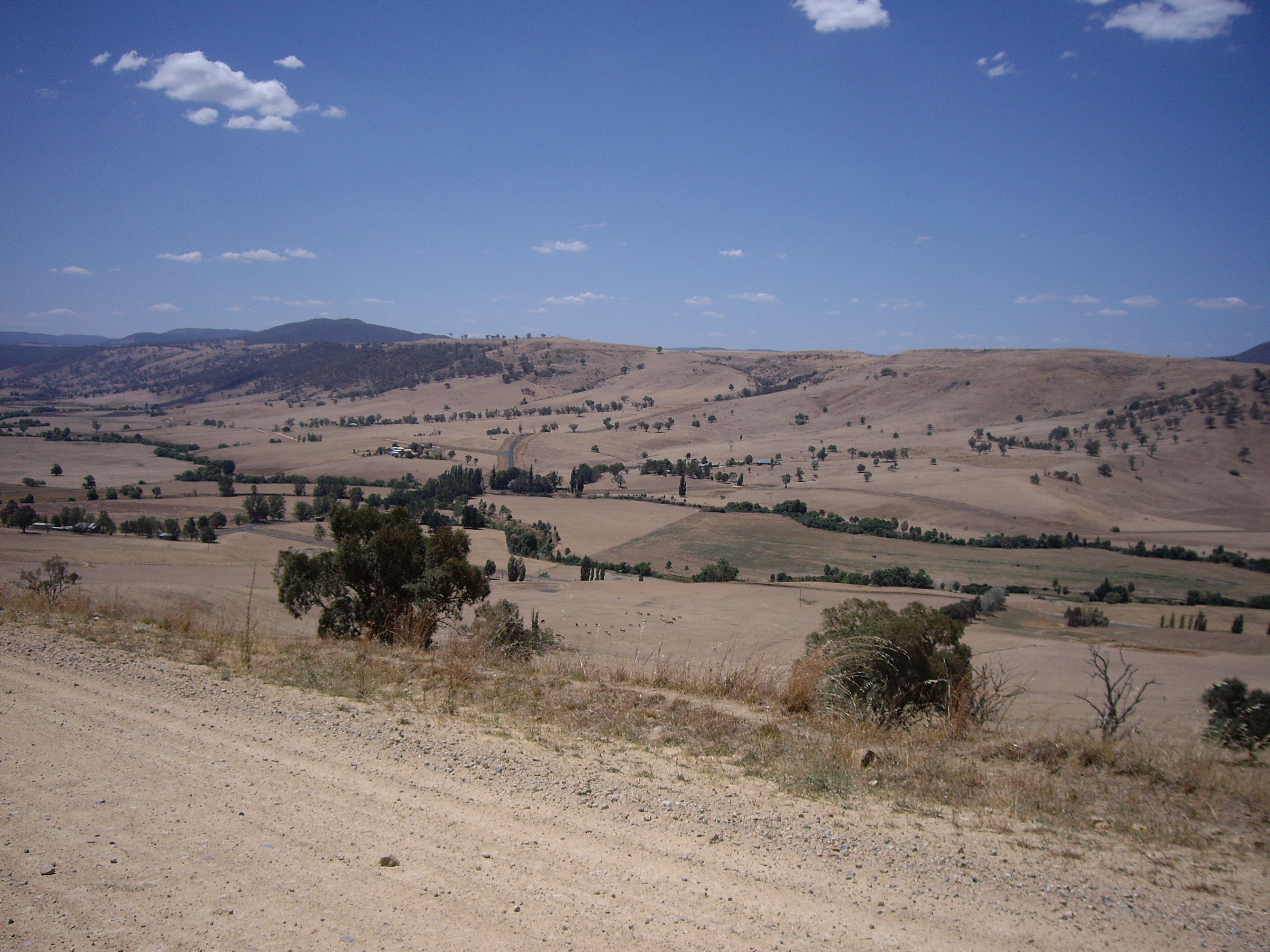
Looking down upon Tooma from the Welaregang Road.

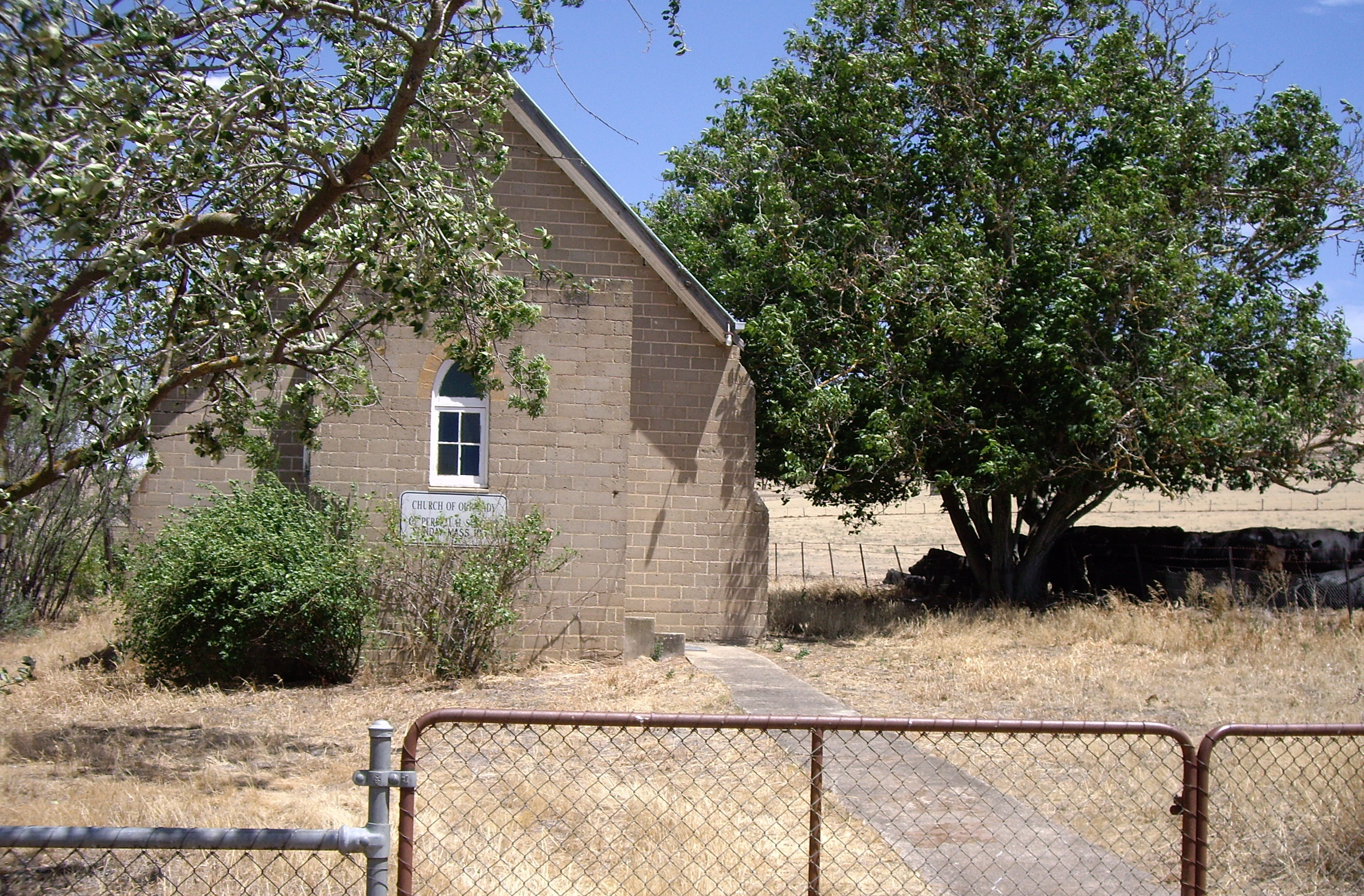
Tooma - Church of Our Lady of Perpetual Succor.

== See also ==
- Snowy Mountains Scheme
- Tooma River
- Tooma Dam
