= Murray Two Dam =

- Location of the Khancoban Dam in New South Wales
- Country: Australia
- Location: Snowy Mountains, New South Wales
- Coordinates: 36°14′S 148°11′E
- Status: Operational
- Opening date: 1968
- Owner: Snowy Hydro

Dam and spillways
- Type of dam: Arch dam
- Impounds: Khancoban Back
- Height: 43 metres (141 ft)
- Length: 131 metres (430 ft)
- Dam volume: 19,500 cubic metres (690,000 cu ft)
- Spillways: 1
- Spillway type: Controlled
- Spillway capacity: 566 cubic metres per second (20,000 cu ft/s)

Reservoir
- Creates: Murray Two Pondage
- Total capacity: 2,344 megalitres (82.8×10^{6} cu ft)
- Catchment area: 53 square kilometres (20 sq mi)
- Surface area: 190 hectares (470 acres)

Murray Two Dam is a major ungated concrete arch dam with a controlled spillway across Khancoban Bank, a diverted flow of the Snowy and Geehi rivers in the Snowy Mountains region of New South Wales, Australia. The impounded reservoir is called the Murray Two Pondage.

== History ==
The structure was completed by Thiess in 1968, and is one of the sixteen major dams that comprise the Snowy Mountains Scheme, a vast hydroelectricity and irrigation complex constructed in south-east Australia between 1949 and 1974 that is now run by Snowy Hydro.

== Location and features ==
Murray Two Dam is a major dam, located within the Snowy Valleys local government area, approximately 5 kilometres (3.1 mi) southeast of the town of Khancoban. The dam was constructed by a consortium including Thiess and Dillingham Corporation based on engineering plans developed under contract from the Snowy Mountains Hydroelectric Authority.

The arch dam wall comprises 19,500 cubic metres (690,000 cu ft) of concrete and is 43 metres (141 ft) high and 131 metres (430 ft) long. At 100% capacity the dam wall holds back 2,344 megalitres (82.8×10^{6} cu ft) of water. The surface area of Murray Two Pondage is 190 hectares (470 acres) and the catchment area is 53 square kilometres (20 sq mi). The controlled spillway is capable of discharging 566 cubic metres per second (20,000 cu ft/s).

=== Power generation ===
Located immediately upstream of the Murray Two Pondage is the Murray 1 Power Station, a 950 megawatts (1,270,000 hp) conventional hydroelectric power station. Murray 1 draws the supply of its water under pressure from an 11.8 kilometres (7.3 mi) Haupt-tunnel, with a diameter of 6.93 metres (22.7 ft), that is fully lined along its length; completed in 1966. Meanwhile, located immediately downstream is the Murray 2 Power Station, a 550 megawatts (740,000 hp) conventional hydroelectric power station. Water from the power plant is discharged into the reservoir, before passing over the spillway of Khancoban Dam, and down the Swampy Plain River.
