= Island Bend Dam =

- Location of the Island Bend Dam in New South Wales
- Country: Australia
- Location: Snowy Mountains, New South Wales
- Coordinates: 36°19′10″S 148°28′13″E
- Status: Operational
- Opening date: 1965
- Owner: Snowy Hydro

Dam and spillways
- Type of dam: Gravity dam
- Impounds: Snowy River
- Height: 49 metres (161 ft)
- Length: 146 metres (479 ft)
- Dam volume: 60,400 cubic metres (2,130,000 cu ft)
- Spillways: 1
- Spillway type: Controlled
- Spillway capacity: 2,832 cubic metres per second (100,000 cu ft/s)

Reservoir
- Creates: Island Bend Pondage
- Total capacity: 3,084 megalitres (108.9×10^{6} cu ft)
- Catchment area: 221 square kilometres (85 sq mi)
- Surface area: 327 hectares (810 acres)

Island Bend Dam is a major gated concrete gravity dam with a controlled spillway across the Snowy River in the Snowy Mountains region of New South Wales, Australia. The dam's main purpose is for the diversion of water for generation of hydro-power and is one of the sixteen major dams that comprise the Snowy Mountains Scheme, a vast hydroelectricity and irrigation complex constructed in south-east Australia between 1949 and 1974 and now run by Snowy Hydro.

The impounded reservoir is called the Island Bend Pondage.

== Location and features ==
Completed in 1965, Island Bend Dam is a major dam, located within the Snowy Monaro Regional Council, adjacent to the locality of Island Bend. The dam was constructed by Utah Construction and Engineering Pty Limited based on engineering plans developed under contract by the Snowy Mountains Hydroelectric Authority.

The dam wall comprising 60,400 cubic metres (2,130,000 cu ft) of concrete is 49 metres (161 ft) high and 146 metres (479 ft) long. At 100% capacity the dam wall holds back 3,084 megalitres (108.9×10^{6} cu ft) of water. The surface area of Island Bend Pondage is 327 hectares (810 acres) and the catchment area is 221 square kilometres (85 sq mi). The controlled spillway is capable of discharging 2,832 cubic metres per second (100,000 cu ft/s).

The dam receives water from Lake Jindabyne and Lake Eucumbene through the Snowy-Island Bend and Snowy-Eucumbene tunnels respectively. The combined water is then sent West through the Snowy-Geehi trans-mountain tunnel to Geehi Dam for generation in the Murray Power Stations. Water can flow in the reverse direction, to Eucumbene and Jindabyne from Geehi for storage during periods of high river flow, or otherwise.

== Climate ==
Climate data for Island Bend, NSW (Island Bend Dam); 1,275 m AMSL; 36° 19′ 59.88″ S
Month	Jan	Feb	Mar	Apr	May	Jun	Jul	Aug	Sep	Oct	Nov	Dec	Year
Mean daily maximum °C (°F)	21.9 (71.4)	22.3 (72.1)	19.9 (67.8)	15.2 (59.4)	11.4 (52.5)	8.9 (48.0)	5.8 (42.4)	7.3 (45.1)	10.8 (51.4)	15.4 (59.7)	17.0 (62.6)	20.1 (68.2)	14.7 (58.4)
Mean daily minimum °C (°F)	6.2 (43.2)	6.5 (43.7)	4.4 (39.9)	1.4 (34.5)	−0.8 (30.6)	−2.5 (27.5)	−3.1 (26.4)	−2.2 (28.0)	−0.2 (31.6)	2.9 (37.2)	3.3 (37.9)	6.2 (43.2)	1.8 (35.3)
Average precipitation mm (inches)	61.7 (2.43)	53.5 (2.11)	81.2 (3.20)	87.4 (3.44)	105.5 (4.15)	140.9 (5.55)	138.2 (5.44)	133.7 (5.26)	134.4 (5.29)	148.8 (5.86)	131.8 (5.19)	113.5 (4.47)	1,330.6 (52.39)
Source: Australian Bureau of Meteorology; Island Bend Dam

== See also ==
- Kosciuszko National Park
- List of dams and reservoirs in New South Wales
- Snowy Hydro Limited
- Snowy Mountains Scheme
- Snowy Scheme Museum
