= Olearia lasiophylla =

Scientific classification
- Kingdom: Plantae
- Clade: Tracheophytes
- Clade: Angiosperms
- Clade: Eudicots
- Clade: Asterids
- Order: Asterales
- Family: Asteraceae
- Genus: Olearia
- Species: O. lasiophylla

Binomial name
- Olearia lasiophylla Lander

Species of shrub

Olearia lasiophylla is a species of flowering plant in the family Asteraceae and is endemic to south-eastern New South Wales. It is a shrub with hairy, elliptic leaves and white or mauve, and yellow daisy-like inflorescences.

== Description ==
Olearia lasiophylla is a shrub that typically grows to a height of up to 1 m (3 ft 3 in), its stems, leaves and bracts covered with star-shaped hairs. The leaves are arranged alternately, scattered, elliptic, 7–55 mm (0.28–2.17 in) long and 4–16 mm (0.16–0.63 in) wide, the edges sometimes wavy or toothed. The heads or daisy-like "flowers" are arranged singly or in small groups on the ends of branchlets and are 22–27 mm (0.87–1.06 in) in diameter on a peduncle up to 34 mm (1.3 in) long. There are three or four rows of bracts at the base of each head, forming a hemispherical involucre 2.8–6 mm (0.11–0.24 in) long. Each head has fourteen or fifteen white or mauve ray florets, the ligule 10–11 mm (0.39–0.43 in) long, surrounding nine to fifteen yellow disc florets. Flowering occurs from November to February and the fruit is a silky-hairy achene, the pappus with 39–52 bristles in two rows.

== Taxonomy ==
Olearia lasiophylla was first formally described in 1991 by Nicholas Sèan Lander in the journal Telopea from plant material collected near Mount Townsend by Neridah Clifton Ford in 1959. The specific epithet (lasiophylla) means "woolly-leaved".

== Distribution and habitat ==
Olearia lasiophylla grows in forest on steep slopes near Geehi Reservoir in Kosciuszko National Park.
