= Port Stanvac Power Station =

Power station in Lonsdale, South Australia

Port StanvacPower Station
- Country: Australia
- Location: Lonsdale, South Australia
- Coordinates: 35.1105°S 138.491°E
- Status: Operational
- Commission date: 2011
- Owner: Snowy Hydro
- Operator: Cummins Power Generation

Thermal power station
- Primary fuel: Diesel
- Turbine technology: Reciprocating engine

Power generation
- Units operational: 36
- Make and model: Cummins
- Nameplate capacity: 58 MW

External links
- Website: www.snowyhydro.com.au/our-energy/gas/diesel/

Port Stanvac Power Station is a diesel-powered electricity generator in South Australia in Lonsdale, an industrial southern suburb of Adelaide. It is owned by Snowy Hydro since 2014. It consists of 36 diesel engines each generating 1.6 MW for a total of 58 MW of electricity to meet peak demands in the National Electricity Market.

The power station was designed by Petro Min Engineers and built by Cummins Power Generation under contract from Infratil. The site had previously been used by the Lonsdale Power Station which was moved to a new site next door in 2011. Snowy Hydro bought assets from Infratil in 2014. These included Lumo Energy, Direct Connect and three diesel peaking generators for a total of 136 MW. The power stations were the Angaston Power Station along with Lonsdale and Port Stanvac.
