= Lonsdale Power Station =

Electricity generating facility in Australia

- Country: Australia
- Location: Lonsdale, South Australia
- Coordinates: 35.1097°S 138.491°E
- Status: Operational
- Commission date: 2002
- Owner: Snowy Hydro
- Operator: Cummins Power Generation

Thermal power station
- Primary fuel: Diesel
- Turbine technology: Reciprocating engine

Power generation
- Units operational: 18
- Make and model: Cummins
- Nameplate capacity: 21 MW

External links
- Website: www.snowyhydro.com.au/our-energy/gas/diesel/

Lonsdale Power Station is a diesel-powered electricity generator in South Australia in Lonsdale, an industrial southern suburb of Adelaide. It is owned by Snowy Hydro since 2014. It consists of 18 diesel reciprocating engines generating up to 21 MW of electricity to meet peak demands in the National Electricity Market.

The power station was designed and built by Cummins Power Generation under contract from Infratil in 2002 on what is now the site of the Port Stanvac Power Station. It was moved along the road to its present site in 2011. Snowy Hydro bought assets from Infratil in 2014. These included Lumo Energy, Direct Connect and three diesel peaking generators for a total of 136 MW. The other two were Angaston Power Station and Port Stanvac Power Station.

It achieves the low emissions mandated by the Environment Protection Agency through selective catalytic reduction technology, matching standards set for gas turbines.
