= Geehi Dam =

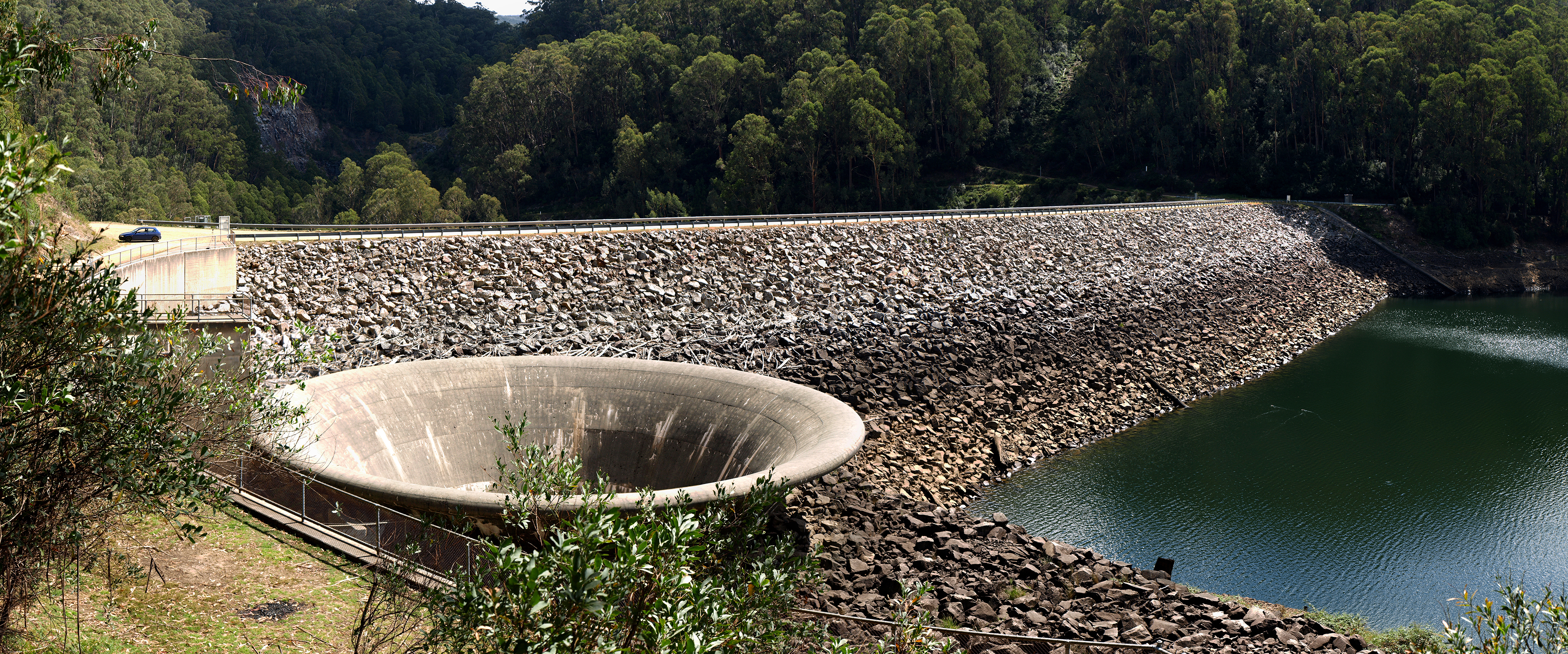
- Wall and spillway.

- Location of Geehi Dam in New South Wales
- Country: Australia
- Location: Snowy Mountains, New South Wales
- Coordinates: 36°18′16.8″S 148°18′55.8″E
- Status: Operational
- Opening date: 1966
- Owner: Snowy Hydro

Dam and spillways
- Type of dam: Embankment dam
- Impounds: Geehi River
- Height: 91 metres (299 ft)
- Length: 265 metres (869 ft)
- Dam volume: 1.421 million cubic metres (50.2×10^{6} cu ft)
- Spillways: 1
- Spillway type: Uncontrolled bell-mouth spillway
- Spillway capacity: 1,534 cubic metres per second (54,200 cu ft/s)

Reservoir
- Creates: Geehi Reservoir
- Total capacity: 21,093 megalitres (744.9×10^{6} cu ft)
- Catchment area: 149 square kilometres (58 sq mi)
- Surface area: 700 hectares (1,700 acres)

Power Station
- Operator: Snowy Hydro
- Commission date: 1967
- Type: Conventional
- Hydraulic head: 460.2 metres (1,510 ft)
- Turbines: 10
- Installed capacity: 950 megawatts (1,270,000 hp)

Geehi Dam is a major ungated rockfill embankment dam across the Geehi River in the Snowy Mountains of New South Wales, Australia. The reservoir impounded by the dam is known as Geehi Reservoir.

== History ==
The structure was completed by Thiess Brothers in 1966, and is one of the sixteen major dams that comprise the Snowy Mountains Scheme, a vast hydroelectricity and irrigation complex constructed in south-east Australia between 1949 and 1974 that is now run by Snowy Hydro.

== Location and features ==
The dam is located within what is now the Snowy Valleys local government area. It was constructed by Thiess Brothers based on engineering plans developed under contract by the Snowy Mountains Hydroelectric Authority.

The dam wall, comprising 1,421,000 cubic metres (50,200,000 cu ft) of rockfill with an earth core, is 91 metres (299 ft) high and 265 metres (869 ft) long. At 100% capacity the dam wall holds back 21,093,000 cubic metres (744,900,000 cu ft) of water. The surface area of Geehi Reservoir is 70 hectares (170 acres) and the catchment area is 149 square kilometres (58 sq mi). The uncontrolled bell-mouth spillway has a diameter of 32 metres (105 ft) and is capable of discharging up to 1,534 cubic metres per second (54,200 cu ft/s).

=== Power generation ===
Geehi Reservoir receives water from Island Bend Pondage through the Snowy-Geehi tunnel. Water from Geehi Reservoir is carried via the Murray 1 pressure tunnel to the Murray 1 power station, which is rated for a hydraulic head of 460.2 metres (1,510 ft) and has a total generating capacity of 950 megawatts (1,270,000 hp) (a net generation of 1,413 gigawatt-hours (5,090 TJ) per annum). The outlet structure for the Snowy-Geehi tunnel is shared with the intake of the Murray 1 pressure tunnel and is accessible by a suspended footbridge.

== See also ==
- Kosciuszko National Park
- List of dams and reservoirs in New South Wales
- Snowy Hydro Limited
- Snowy Mountains Scheme
- Snowy Scheme Museum
