= Angaston =

Angaston may refer to:

- Angaston, South Australia, a town on the eastern side of the Barossa Valley in South Australia

- Angaston railway line, a former railway line which terminated in the town
- Angaston railway station, the terminal station on the railway line
- Angaston Power Station, a 50MW diesel-powered electricity generator outside the town
- Angaston Football Club, Australian Rules football club based in the town
