= List of acts of the Parliament of Victoria from 1997 =

This is a list of acts of the Parliament of Victoria, Australia for the year 1997.

== 1997 ==
Short title, or popular name	Citation	Royal assent
Long title
Parliament House Completion Authority (Repeal) Act 1997	No. 1 of 1997	15 April 1997
An Act to repeal the Parliament House Completion Authority Act 1996 (Note: Parliament House Completion Authority Act 1996 (No. 9 of 1996)) and for other purposes.
Cinemedia Corporation Act 1997	No. 2 of 1997	22 April 1997
An Act to establish the Cinemedia Corporation, to repeal the Film Victoria Act 1981 (Note: Film Victoria Act 1981 (No. 9716)) and the State Film Centre of Victoria Council Act 1983 (Note: State Film Centre of Victoria Council Act 1983 (No. 9943)) and for other purposes.
Education (Standards Council) Act 1997	No. 3 of 1997	
Evidence (Audio Visual and Audio Linking) Act 1997	No. 4 of 1997	
Fisheries (Further Amendment) Act 1997	No. 5 of 1997	
Interpretation of Legislation (Amendment) Act 1997 (repealed)	No. 6 of 1997	
(Repealed by Statute Law Revision Act 2000 (No. 74 of 2000))
National Parks (Amendment) Act 1997 (repealed)	No. 7 of 1997	
(Repealed by Legislation Reform (Repeals No. 2) Act 2008 (No. 16 of 2008))
Board of Studies (Amendment) Act 1997 (repealed)	No. 8 of 1997	
(Repealed by Statute Law Revision Act 2000 (No. 74 of 2000))
Melbourne University (VCAH) Act 1997	No. 9 of 1997	29 April 1997
An Act to amend the Melbourne University Act 1958 (Note: University Act 1958 (No. 6405)) to provide for the merger of the Victorian College of Agriculture and Horticulture with The University of Melbourne, to make consequential amendments to the Vocational Education and Training Act 1990 (Note: Vocational Education and Training Act 1990 (No. 45 of 1990)) and for other purposes.
National Australia Bank and Bank of New Zealand Act 1997	No. 10 of 1997	29 April 1997
An Act to provide for the transfer to National Australia Bank Limited of the banking business of Bank of New Zealand and for other purposes.
Racing (Amendment) Act 1997 (repealed)	No. 11 of 1997	
(Repealed by Statute Law Revision Act 2000 (No. 74 of 2000))
Teaching Service (Amendment) Act 1997 (repealed)	No. 12 of 1997	
(Repealed by Statute Law Revision Act 2000 (No. 74 of 2000))
Constitution and Parliamentary Committees (Amendment) Act 1997	No. 13 of 1997	
Electricity Industry (Loy Yang B) Act 1997 (repealed)	No. 14 of 1997	
(Repealed by Statute Law Revision Act 2000 (No. 74 of 2000))
Gaming Acts (Further Amendment) Act 1997	No. 15 of 1997	
Gaming No. 2 Act 1997	No. 16 of 1997	
Health Services (Community Health Centres) Act 1997 (repealed)	No. 17 of 1997	
(Repealed by Statute Law Revision Act 2000 (No. 74 of 2000))
Heritage (Amendment) Act 1997 (repealed)	No. 18 of 1997	
(Repealed by Statute Law Revision Act 2000 (No. 74 of 2000))
Hire-Purchase (Amendment) Act 1997 (repealed)	No. 19 of 1997	
(Repealed by Statute Law Revision Act 2000 (No. 74 of 2000))
Education (Further Amendment) Act 1997 (repealed)	No. 20 of 1997	
(Repealed by Statute Law Revision Act 2000 (No. 74 of 2000))
Land (Revocation of Miscellaneous Reservations) Act 1997	No. 21 of 1997	
Office of the Regulator-General (Amendment) Act 1997 (repealed)	No. 22 of 1997	
(Repealed by Statute Law Revision Act 2000 (No. 74 of 2000))
Anglican Welfare Agency Act 1997	No. 23 of 1997	20 May 1997
An Act relating to the Anglican Welfare Agency and for other purposes.
Fire Authorities (Amendment) Act 1997	No. 24 of 1997	
Livestock Disease Control (Amendment) Act 1997 (repealed)	No. 25 of 1997	
(Repealed by Statute Law Revision Act 2000 (No. 74 of 2000))
Police and Corrections (Amendment) Act 1997 (repealed)	No. 26 of 1997	
(Repealed by Statute Law Revision Act 2000 (No. 74 of 2000))
Local Government (Further Amendment) Act 1997 (repealed)	No. 27 of 1997	
(Repealed by Statute Law Revision Act 2000 (No. 74 of 2000))
Melbourne Lands (Yarra River North Bank) Act 1997	No. 28 of 1997	
National Electricity (Victoria) Act 1997 (repealed)	No. 29 of 1997	27 May 1997
An Act to make provision for the operation of a national electricity market and for other purposes. (Repealed by National Electricity (Victoria) Act 2005 (No. 8 of 2005))
Road Safety (Disclosure of Information) Act 1997 (repealed)	No. 30 of 1997	
(Repealed by Statute Law Revision Act 2000 (No. 74 of 2000))
State Taxation Acts (Amendment) Act 1997 (repealed)	No. 31 of 1997	
(Repealed by Statute Law Revision Act 2000 (No. 74 of 2000))
Appropriation (1997/98) Act 1997	No. 32 of 1997	
Appropriation (Parliament 1997/98) Act 1997	No. 33 of 1997	
Building (Further Amendment) Act 1997	No. 34 of 1997	
Electricity Industry (Miscellaneous Amendment) Act 1997	No. 35 of 1997	3 June 1997
An Act to provide for further miscellaneous amendment of the Electricity Industry Act 1993, (Note: Electricity Industry Act 1993 (No. 130 of 1993)) to amend the State Electricity Commission Act 1958 (Note: State Electricity Commission Act 1958 (No. 6377)) and certain other Acts and for other purposes.
Gas Industry (Amendment) Act 1997	No. 36 of 1997	3 June 1997
Infertility Treatment (Amendment) Act 1997 (repealed)	No. 37 of 1997	3 June 1997
(Repealed by Statute Law Revision Act 2000 (No. 74 of 2000))
Melbourne and Metropolitan Board of Works (Amendment) Act 1997 (repealed)	No. 38 of 1997	3 June 1997
(Repealed by Statute Law Revision Act 2000 (No. 74 of 2000))
Melbourne City Link (Further Amendment) Act 1997 (repealed)	No. 39 of 1997	3 June 1997
(Repealed by Statute Law Revision Act 2000 (No. 74 of 2000))
Taxation Administration Act 1997	No. 40 of 1997	3 June 1997
An Act to make general provision for the administration and enforcement of taxation laws, to make consequential amendments to other Acts and for other purposes.
Environment Conservation Council Act 1997 (repealed)	No. 41 of 1997	11 June 1997
An Act to establish an Environment Conservation Council, to make consequential amendments to other Acts and for other purposes. (Repealed by Victorian Environmental Assessment Council Act 2001 (No. 81 of 2001))
Financial Management (Amendment) Act 1997 (repealed)	No. 42 of 1997	11 June 1997
(Repealed by Statute Law Revision Act 2000 (No. 74 of 2000))
Friendly Societies (Victoria) (Amendment) Act 1997	No. 43 of 1997	11 June 1997
Law and Justice Legislation Amendment Act 1997	No. 44 of 1997	11 June 1997
Miscellaneous Acts (Omnibus No. 3) Act 1997 (repealed)	No. 45 of 1997	11 June 1997
An Act to amend the Accident Compensation Act 1985, (Note: Accident Compensation Act 1985 (No. 10191)) the Accident Compensation Act (Further Amendment) Act 1996, (Note: Accident Compensation (Further Amendment) Act 1996 (No. 60 of 1996)) the Borrowing and Investment Powers Act 1987, (Note: Borrowing and Investment Powers Act 1987 (No. 13 of 1987)) the Cancer Act 1958, (Note: Cancer Act 1958 (No. 6213)) the Dried Fruits Act 1958, (Note: Dried Fruits Act 1958 (No. 6239)) the Melbourne and Metropolitan Board of Works Act 1958, (Note: Melbourne and Metropolitan Board of Works Act 1958 (No. 6310)) the Parliamentary Officers Act 1975, (Note: Parliamentary Officers Act 1975 ( No. 8730)) the Pharmacists Act 1974, (Note: Pharmacists Act 1974 (No. 8593)) the Plant Health and Plant Products Act 1995, (Note: Plant Health and Plant Products Act 1995 (No. 51 of 1995)) the State Owned Enterprises Act 1992, (Note: State Owned Enterprises Act 1992 (No. 90 of 1992)) the Water Industry Act 1994 (Note: Water Industry Act 1994 (No. 121 of 1994)) and the Zoological Parks and Gardens Act 1995 (Note: Zoological Parks and Gardens Act 1995 (No. 106 of 1995)) and for other purposes. (Repealed by Statute Law Revision Act 2000 (No. 74 of 2000))
Project Development and Construction Management (Amendment) Act 1997 (repealed)	No. 46 of 1997	
(Repealed by Statute Law Revision Act 2000 (No. 74 of 2000))
Prostitution Control (Amendment) Act 1997 (repealed)	No. 47 of 1997	
(Repealed by Statute Law Revision Act 2000 (No. 74 of 2000))
Sentencing and Other Acts (Amendment) Act 1997	No. 48 of 1997	
State Taxation Acts (Further Amendment) Act 1997 (repealed)	No. 49 of 1997	
(Repealed by Statute Law Revision Act 2000 (No. 74 of 2000))
Superannuation Acts (Miscellaneous Amendment) Act 1997 (repealed)	No. 50 of 1997	
(Repealed by Statute Law Revision Act 2000 (No. 74 of 2000))
Unclaimed Moneys (Superannuation Benefits) Act 1997	No. 51 of 1997	
Victims of Crime Assistance (Amendment) Act 1997	No. 52 of 1997	
Construction Industry Long Service Leave Act 1997	No. 53 of 1997	
Drugs, Poisons and Controlled Substances (Amendment) Act 1997 (repealed)	No. 54 of 1997	
(Repealed by Statute Law Revision Act 2000 (No. 74 of 2000))
Electricity Industry (Further Miscellaneous Amendment) Act 1997	No. 55 of 1997	
Melbourne and Olympic Parks (Amendment) Act 1997 (repealed)	No. 56 of 1997	21 October 1997
An Act to amend the Melbourne and Olympic Parks Act 1985 (Note: National Tennis Centre Act 1985 (No. 10206)) to extend the functions of the Melbourne and Olympic Parks Trust and for other purposes. (Repealed by Statute Law Revision Act 2000 (No. 74 of 2000))
Associations Incorporation (Amendment) Act 1997 (repealed)	No. 57 of 1997	
(Repealed by Statute Law Revision Act 2000 (No. 74 of 2000))
Veterinary Practice Act 1997	No. 58 of 1997	
Commonwealth Powers (Family Law-Children) (Amendment) Act 1997 (repealed)	No. 59 of 1997	5 November 1997
An Act to amend the Commonwealth Powers (Family Law-Children) Act 1986 (Note: Commonwealth Powers (Family Law-Children) Act 1986 (No. 92 of 1986)) with respect to the reference of matters to the Commonwealth Parliament and for other purposes. (Repealed by Statute Law Revision Act 2000 (No. 74 of 2000))
Education (Work Experience) Act 1997 (repealed)	No. 60 of 1997	
(Repealed by Statute Law Revision Act 2000 (No. 74 of 2000))
Financial Institutions Legislation (Amendment) Act 1997 (repealed)	No. 61 of 1997	
(Repealed by Statute Law Revision Act 2000 (No. 74 of 2000))
Forests (Dunstan Agreement) (Amendment) Act 1997 (repealed)	No. 62 of 1997	
(Repealed by Statute Law Revision Act 2000 (No. 74 of 2000))
Port Services (Amendment) Act 1997 (repealed)	No. 63 of 1997	
(Repealed by Statute Law Revision Act 2000 (No. 74 of 2000))
Road Transport (Dangerous Goods) (Amendment) Act 1997 (repealed)	No. 64 of 1997	
(Repealed by Statute Law Revision Act 2000 (No. 74 of 2000))
Crimes (Mental Impairment and Unfitness to be Tried) Act 1997	No. 65 of 1997	18 November 1997
An Act to reform the law relating to fitness to stand trial for criminal offences and to the defence of insanity, to amend the Corrections Act 1986, (Note: Corrections Act 1986 (No. 117 of 1986)) the Crimes Act 1958, (Note: Crimes Act 1958 (No. 6231)) the Intellectually Disabled Persons' Services Act 1986 (Note: Intellectually Disabled Persons' Services Act 1986 (No. 53 of 1986)) and the Mental Health Act 1986 (Note: Mental Health Act 1986 (No. 59 of 1986)) and for other purposes.
Docklands Authority (Amendment) Act 1997 (repealed)	No. 66 of 1997	18 November 1997
An Act to amend the Docklands Authority Act 1991 (Note: Docklands Authority Act 1991 (No. 22 of 1991)) and to repeal the Development Areas Act 1973 (Note: Development Areas Act 1973 (No. 8524)) and for other purposes. (Repealed by Statute Law Revision Act 2000 (No. 74 of 2000))
Geelong Performing Arts Centre Trust (Amendment) Act 1997 (repealed)	No. 67 of 1997	18 November 1997
(Repealed by Statute Law Revision Act 2000 (No. 74 of 2000))
Melbourne Sports and Aquatic Centre (Amendment) Act 1997 (repealed)	No. 68 of 1997	18 November 1997
(Repealed by Statute Law Revision Act 2000 (No. 74 of 2000))
Sentencing (Amendment) Act 1997	No. 69 of 1997	18 November 1997
University Acts (Further Amendment) Act 1997	No. 70 of 1997	18 November 1997
An Act to amend the Deakin University Act 1974, (Note: Deakin University Act 1974 (No. 8610)) the La Trobe University Act 1964, (Note: La Trobe University Act 1964 (No. 7189)) the Melbourne University Act 1958, the Monash University Act 1958, (Note: Monash University Act 1958 (No. 6184)) the Royal Melbourne Institute of Technology Act 1992, (Note: Royal Melbourne Institute of Technology Act 1992 (No. 45 of 1992)) the Swinburne University of Technology Act 1992, (Note: Swinburne University of Technology Act 1992 (No. 44 of 1992)) the Victoria University of Technology Act 1990 (Note: Victoria University of Technology Act 1990 (No. 21 of 1990)) and the Tertiary Education Act 1993 (Note: Tertiary Education Act 1993 (No. 18 of 1993)) and for other purposes.
Urban Land Corporation Act 1997 or the Urban and Regional Land Corporation Act 1997	No. 71 of 1997	18 November 1997
An Act to establish the Urban Land Corporation, to repeal the Urban Land Authority Act 1979 (Note: Urban Land Authority Act 1979 (No. 9320)) and for other purposes.
Disability Services and Other Acts (Amendment) Act 1997 (repealed)	No. 72 of 1997	
(Repealed by Statute Law Revision Act 2000 (No. 74 of 2000))
Health Services (Amendment) Act 1997 (repealed)	No. 73 of 1997	
(Repealed by Statute Law Revision Act 2000 (No. 74 of 2000))
Hire-Purchase (Further Amendment) Act 1997 (repealed)	No. 74 of 1997	
(Repealed by Statute Law Revision Act 2000 (No. 74 of 2000))
Introduction Agents Act 1997	No. 75 of 1997	
Local Government (Miscellaneous Amendment) Act 1997 (repealed)	No. 76 of 1997	
(Repealed by Statute Law Revision Act 2000 (No. 74 of 2000))
Mental Health (Victorian Institute of Forensic Mental Health) Act 1997 (repealed)	No. 77 of 1997	
(Repealed by Statute Law Revision Act 2000 (No. 74 of 2000))
Podiatrists Registration Act 1997	No. 78 of 1997	
University of Ballarat (Amendment) Act 1997 (repealed)	No. 79 of 1997	25 November 1997
An Act to amend the University of Ballarat Act 1993 (Note: University of Ballarat Act 1993 (No. 107 of 1993)) to provide for the merger of The School of Mines and Industries Ballarat Limited and the Wimmera Institute of TAFE with the University of Ballarat and other miscellaneous matters, to make consequential amendments to the Vocational Education and Training Act 1990 and for other purposes. (Repealed by Statute Law Revision Act 2000 (No. 74 of 2000))
Vocational Education and Training (Training Framework) Act 1997 (repealed)	No. 80 of 1997	
(Repealed by Statute Law Revision Act 2000 (No. 74 of 2000))
Crimes (Amendment) Act 1997	No. 81 of 1997	2 December 1997
An Act to amend the Crimes Act 1958, the Evidence Act 1958 (Note: Evidence Act 1958 (No. 6246)) and the Magistrates' Court Act 1989 (Note: Magistrates' Court Act 1989 (No. 51 of 1989)) and for other purposes.
Education (Preschools) Act 1997 (repealed)	No. 82 of 1997	2 December 1997
(Repealed by Statute Law Revision Act 2000 (No. 74 of 2000))
Health Services (St Andrew's Hospital) Act 1997 (repealed)	No. 83 of 1997	2 December 1997
(Repealed by Statute Law Revision Act 2000 (No. 74 of 2000))
Law and Justice Legislation (Further Amendment) Act 1997 (repealed)	No. 84 of 1997	2 December 1997
(Repealed by Statute Law Revision Act 2000 (No. 74 of 2000))
St Andrew's Foundation Act 1997	No. 85 of 1997	2 December 1997
An Act to provide for the transfer of certain charitable donations and bequests to the trustees of The St Andrew's Foundation and for other purposes.
State Taxation (Amendment) Act 1997 (repealed)	No. 86 of 1997	
(Repealed by Statute Law Revision Act 2000 (No. 74 of 2000))
Wildlife (Amendment) Act 1997 (repealed)	No. 87 of 1997	
(Repealed by Statute Law Revision Act 2000 (No. 74 of 2000))
Wills Act 1997	No. 88 of 1997	
Alpine Resorts (Management) Act 1997	No. 89 of 1997	9 December 1997
An Act to make provision for the establishment of an Alpine Resorts Co-ordinating Council and six Alpine Resort Management Boards, to make provision for the management of alpine resorts, to amend the Alpine Resorts Act 1983, (Note: Alpine Resorts Act 1983 (No. 9974)) to make related amendments to other Acts and for other purposes.
Gaming Acts (Miscellaneous Amendment) Act 1997	No. 90 of 1997	
Gas Industry (Further Amendment) Act 1997	No. 91 of 1997	
Unclaimed Moneys (Amendment) Act 1997 (repealed)	No. 92 of 1997	
(Repealed by Statute Law Revision Act 2000 (No. 74 of 2000))
Audit (Amendment) Act 1997	No. 93 of 1997	
Business Franchise Fees (Safety Net) Act 1997 (repealed)	No. 94 of 1997	
(Repealed by Statute Law Revision Act 2000 (No. 74 of 2000))
Constitution (Amendment) Act 1997 (repealed)	No. 95 of 1997	16 December 1997
An Act to amend the Constitution Act 1975 (Note: Constitution Act 1975 (No. 8750)) with respect to the publication, transmission and broadcasting of Parliamentary proceedings and for other purposes. (Repealed by Statute Law Revision Act 2000 (No. 74 of 2000))
Education (State Schools) Act 1997 (repealed)	No. 96 of 1997	16 December 1997
(Repealed by Statute Law Revision Act 2000 (No. 74 of 2000))
Epworth Hospital (Amendment) Act 1997 (repealed)	No. 97 of 1997	16 December 1997
An Act to amend the Epworth Hospital Act 1980 (Note: Epworth Hospital Act 1980 (No. 9404)) and for other purposes. (Repealed by Statute Law Revision Act 2013 (No. 70 of 2013)
Food (Amendment) Act 1997 (repealed)	No. 98 of 1997	16 December 1997
(Repealed by Statute Law Revision Act 2000 (No. 74 of 2000))
Gas Safety Act 1997	No. 99 of 1997	16 December 1997
An Act to provide for the safe conveyance, sale, supply, measurement, control and use of gas, to amend the Gas Industry Act 1994 (Note: Gas Industry Act 1994 (No. 112 of 1994)) and other Acts and for other purposes.
Land (Reservations and other Matters) Act 1997	No. 100 of 1997	16 December 1997
Land Tax (Amendment) Act 1997 (repealed)	No. 101 of 1997	16 December 1997
(Repealed by Statute Law Revision Act 2000 (No. 74 of 2000))
Legal Practice (Amendment) Act 1997 (repealed)	No. 102 of 1997	16 December 1997
(Repealed by Statute Law Revision Act 2000 (No. 74 of 2000))
Planning and Environment (Amendment) Act 1997 (repealed)	No. 103 of 1997	16 December 1997
(Repealed by Statute Law Revision Act 2000 (No. 74 of 2000))
Rail Corporations (Amendment) Act 1997 (repealed)	No. 104 of 1997	16 December 1997
(Repealed by Statute Law Revision Act 2000 (No. 74 of 2000))
Snowy Hydro Corporatisation Act 1997	No. 105 of 1997	16 December 1997
An Act to corporatise the Snowy Mountains Hydro-electric Authority in accordance with arrangements made between the Commonwealth, New South Wales and Victoria, to repeal the Snowy Mountains Hydro-electric Agreements Act 1958 (Note: Snowy Mountains Hydro-electric Agreements Act 1958 (No. 6180)) and the Snowy Mountains Engineering Corporation (Victoria) Act 1971 (Note: Snowy Mountains Engineering Corporation (Victoria) Act 1971 (No. 8098)) and for other purposes.
Transport Acts (Amendment) Act 1997 (repealed)	No. 106 of 1997	
(Repealed by Statute Law Repeals Act 2012 (No. 30 of 2012))
Accident Compensation (Miscellaneous Amendment) Act 1997 (repealed)	No. 107 of 1997	
(Repealed by Statute Law Repeals Act 2012 (No. 30 of 2012))
Confiscation Act 1997	No. 108 of 1997	23 December 1997
An Act to provide for the forfeiture of the proceeds of crime and other property in certain circumstances, to amend the Sentencing Act 1991, (Note: Sentencing Act 1991 (No. 49 of 1991)) to repeal the Crimes (Confiscation of Profits) Act 1986 (Note: Crimes (Confiscation of Profits) Act 1986 (No. 101 of 1986)) and for other purposes.
Residential Tenancies Act 1997	No. 109 of 1997	23 December 1997
An Act to re-enact with amendments the law relating to residential tenancies, rooming houses and caravan parks, to provide for a Residential Tenancies Tribunal and a Residential Tenancies Bond Authority, to repeal the Residential Tenancies Act 1980, (Note: Residential Tenancies Act 1980 (No. 9514)) the Caravan Parks and Movable Dwellings Act 1988 (Note: Caravan Parks and Movable Dwellings Act 1988 (No. 51 of 1988)) and the Rooming Houses Act 1990 (Note: Rooming Houses Act 1990 (No. 33 of 1990)) and for other purposes.
Water Acts (Further Amendment) Act 1997 (repealed)	No. 110 of 1997	23 December 1997
An Act to amend the Melbourne and Metropolitan Board of Works Act 1958, the Water Act 1989, (Note: Water Act 1989 (No. 80 of 1989)) the Water Industry Act 1994, the Food Act 1984, (Note: Food Act 1984 (No. 10082)) the Health Act 1958, (Note: Health Act 1958 (No. 6270)) the Health (Fluoridation) Act 1973 (Note: Health (Fluoridation) Act 1973 (No. 8506)) and certain other Acts and for other purposes. (Repealed by Statute Law Revision Act 2000 (No. 74 of 2000))

== Sources ==
- "Acts as made: 1997". Victoria Legislation.
