= Murray Hydroelectric Power Station =

Murray 1
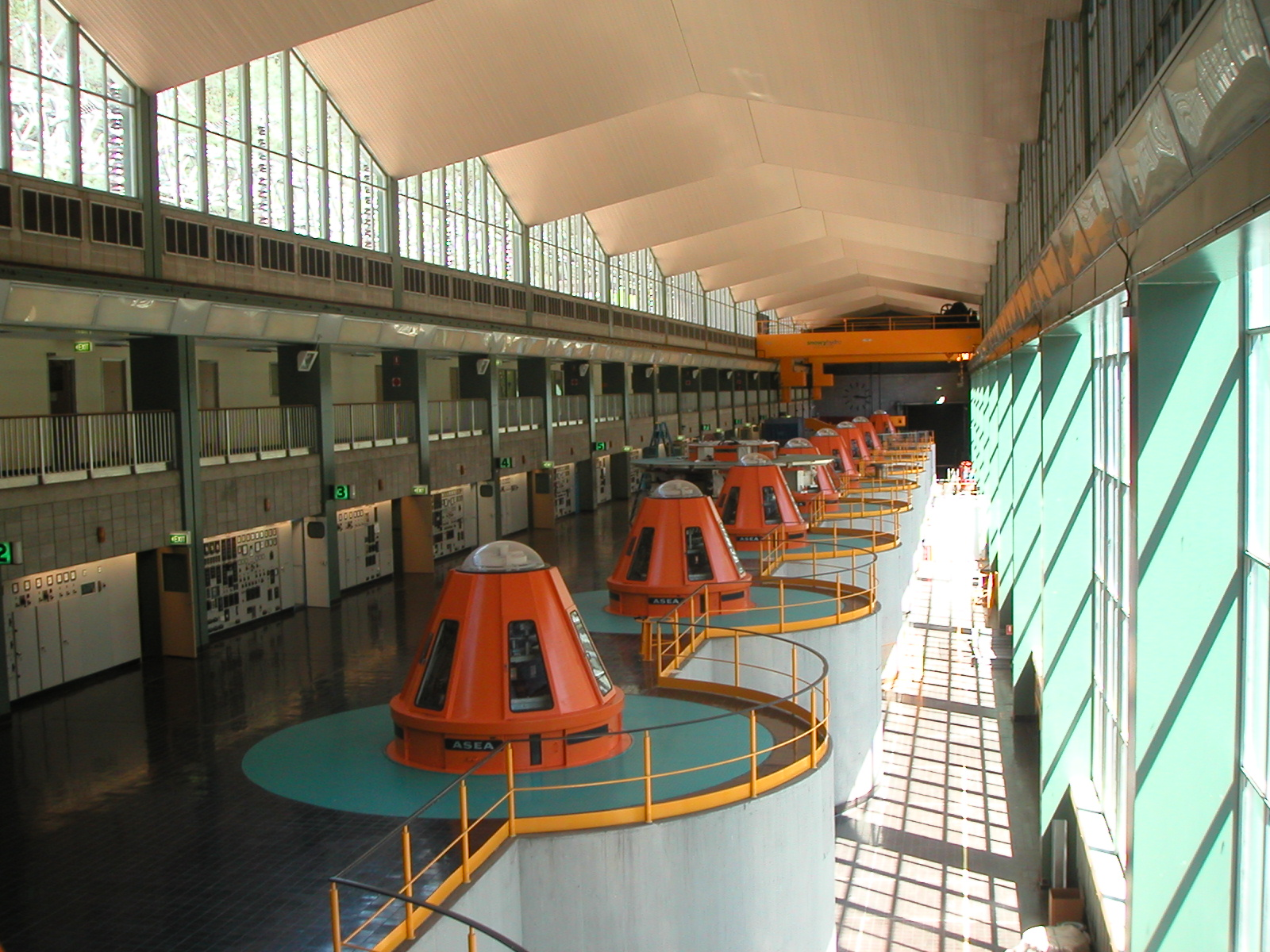
- The machine hall floor of Murray 1 Power Station
- Official name: Murray One Hydroelectric Power Station
- Country: Australia
- Location: Snowy Mountains, New South Wales
- Coordinates: 36°14′49″S 148°11′25″E
- Status: Operational
- Opening date: 1967
- Owner(s): Snowy Hydro

Upper reservoir
- Creates: Geehi Reservoir
- Total capacity: 21,093 ML (744.9 million cu ft)

Lower reservoir
- Creates: Murray 2 Pondage
- Total capacity: 2,344 ML (82.8 million cu ft)

Power Station
- Hydraulic head: 460.2 m (1,510 ft)
- Pump-generators: 10
- Installed capacity: 950 MW (1.27 million hp)
- Annual generation: 1,413 GWh (5,090 TJ)

Murray 2
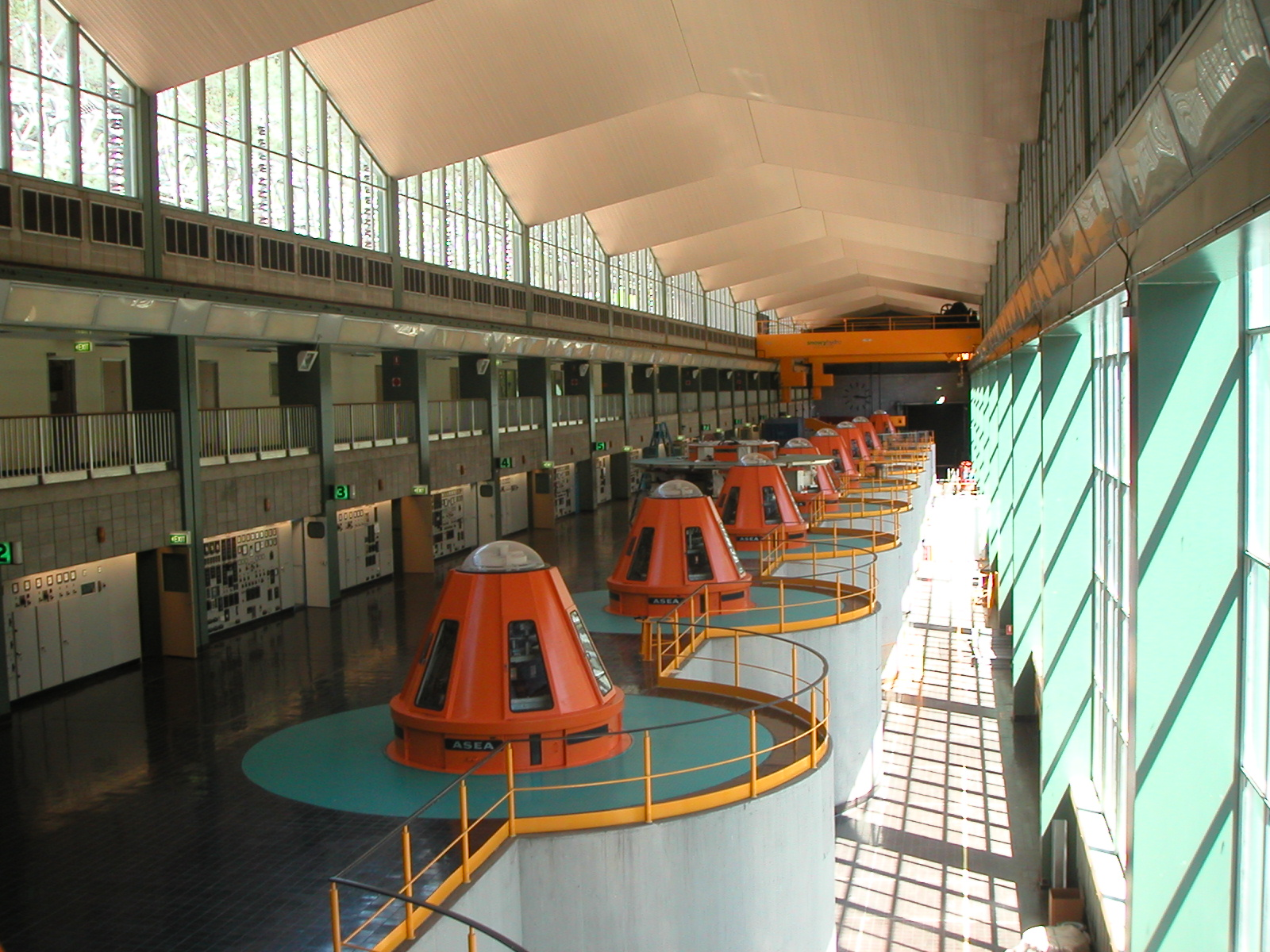
- Official name: Murray Two Hydroelectric Power Station
- Country: Australia
- Location: Snowy Mountains, New South Wales
- Coordinates: 36°14′33″S 148°08′11″E
- Status: Operational
- Opening date: 1969
- Owner(s): Snowy Hydro

Upper reservoir
- Creates: Murray 2 Pondage

Lower reservoir
- Creates: Khancoban Reservoir
- Total capacity: 26,643 ML (940.9 million cu ft)

Power Station
- Hydraulic head: 264.3 m (867 ft)
- Installed capacity: 550 MW (740,000 hp)
- Annual generation: 810 GWh (2,900 TJ)

The Murray Region Hydroelectric Power Stations refers to two of the original seven hydroelectric power stations, both located near the town of Khancoban in the Snowy Mountains region of New South Wales, Australia. The two power stations are part of the Snowy Mountains Scheme, a vast hydroelectricity and irrigation complex constructed in south-east Australia between 1949 and 1974 and now run by Snowy Hydro. Although both power stations are physically located in New South Wales, since 1 July 2008 all power generated has been allocated to the Victorian region of the National Electricity Market. The stations are not located on the Murray River; their names derive from the fact that their tailwaters ultimately drain into the Murray, via the Swampy Plain River.

These two stations are connected to the National Electricity Market via the TransGrid 330 kV Murray Switching Station (and the 330/132 kV substation for Guthega Power Station, Jindabyne Pumping Station & Jindabyne Dam Wall Mini Hydro Power Stations), 1.56 km (0.97 mi) south-east of Khancoban.

== Stations ==
=== Murray 1 Station ===
Murray 1 Power Station is located 6.5 km (4 mi) south-east of Khancoban along the Alpine Way. The conventional gravity-fed hydroelectric power station has ten vertical UK-manufactured Francis, Boving Engineering turbines, each fitted with ASEA-manufactured generators, with a combined generating capacity of 950 MW (1.27 million hp) of electricity. The power station was completed in 1967, and has 460.2 m (1,510 ft) rated head. Fed by natural inflow, supplemented by the pumped flows of the Snowy-Geehi Haupt tunnel from Island Bend Pondage, it receives water from the Geehi Reservoir on the Geehi River and discharges into the Murray 2 Pondage. The station is capable of producing enough electricity to supply over 95,000 homes.

Murray 1 will undergo a series of outages, from 2013 to 2022 inclusive, in order to complete maintenance on each turbine and generator.

Murray 1 Power Station Lookout is located opposite Murray 1 Hydroelectric Power Station across Khancoban Back Creek, 8 km south-east on the Alpine Way from the Snowy Hydro Visitor Centre in association with Khancoban Visitor Centre.

=== Murray 2 Power Station ===
Murray 2 Power Station is located approximately 2.5 km (1.6 mi) south of Khancoban along the Alpine Way. The conventional gravity-fed hydroelectric power station has four vertical Francis turbines, of Hitachi manufacturing in Japan, each coupled to ASEA generators, with a combined generating capacity of 550 MW (740,000 hp) of electricity. This site was the first use of Japanese supply of large electrical and mechanical components in the Snowy Scheme. The power station was completed in 1969, and has 264.3 m (867 ft) rated head. Fed by the water discharged from Murray 1 Power Station into the Murray Two Pondage, Murray 2 Power Station discharges water into the Khancoban Pondage, and into the Swampy Plain River.

Murray 2 will undergo a series of outages, during 2020 to 2022 inclusive, in order to complete maintenance on two of the turbines and generators.

== Gallery ==
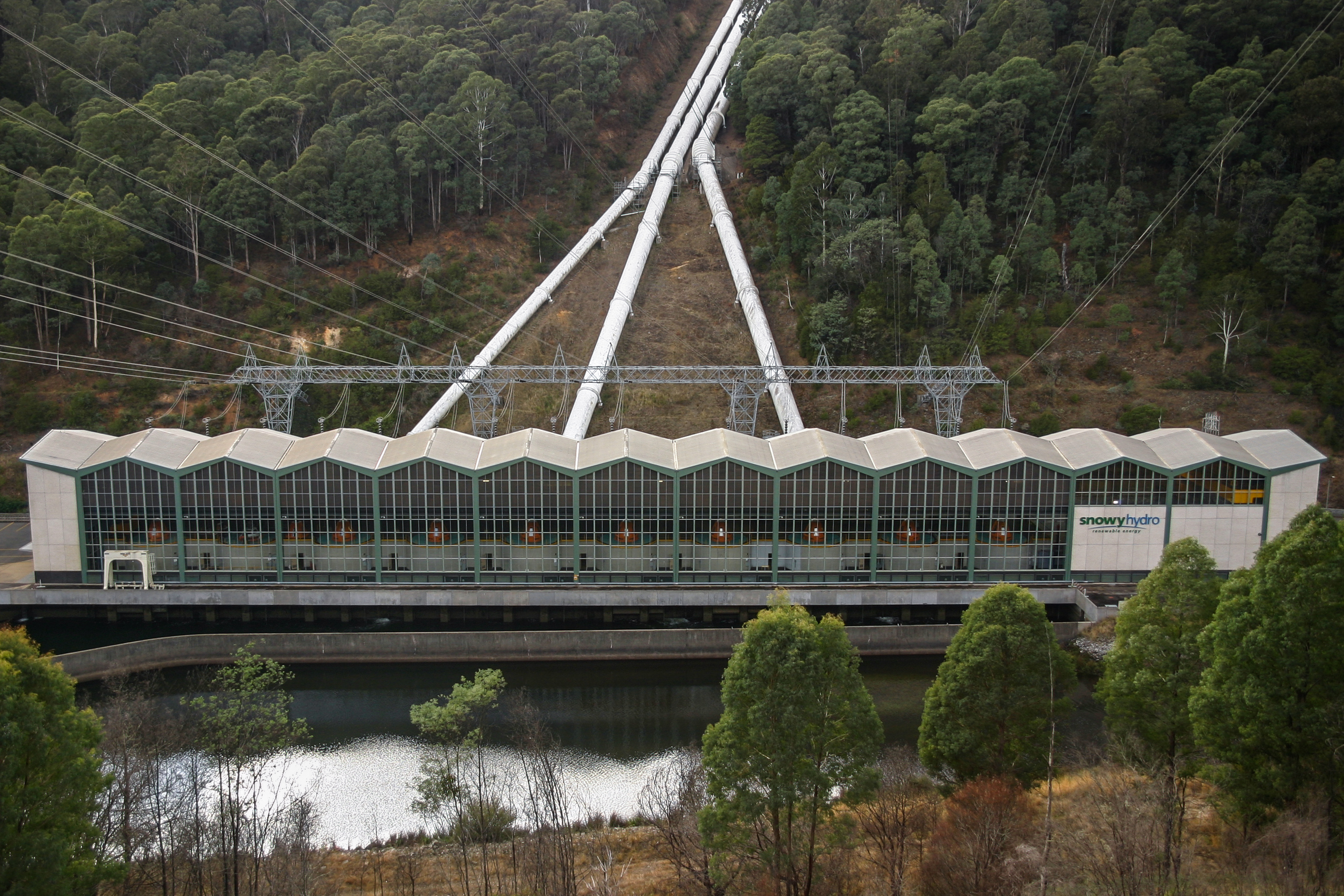
An exterior view of the Murray 1 Power Station.

== See also ==
- List of power stations in New South Wales
