= Khancoban Dam =

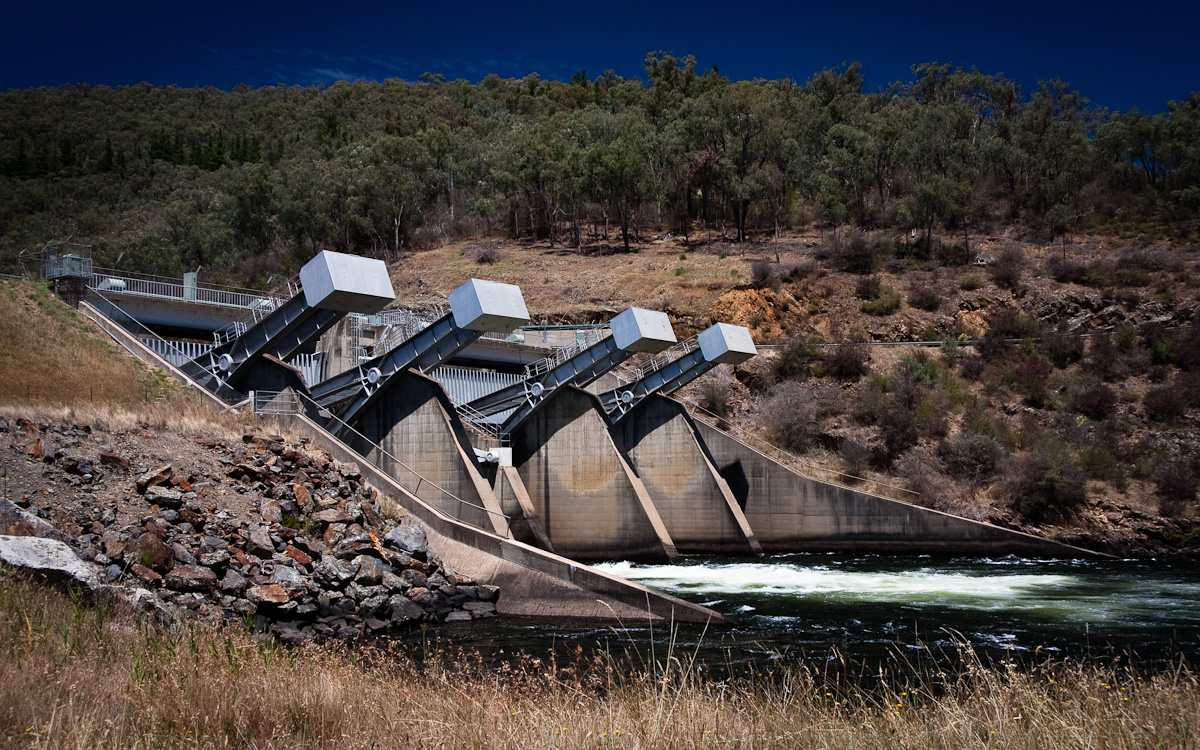
- Khancoban Dam spillway in January 2010

- Location of the Khancoban Dam in New South Wales
- Country: Australia
- Location: Snowy Mountains, New South Wales
- Coordinates: 36°14′S 148°07′E
- Status: Operational
- Opening date: 1965
- Owner: Snowy Hydro

Dam and spillways
- Type of dam: Embankment dam
- Impounds: Swampy Plain River
- Height: 18 metres (59 ft)
- Length: 1,067 metres (3,501 ft)
- Dam volume: 629,100 cubic metres (22,220,000 cu ft)
- Spillways: 1
- Spillway type: Controlled
- Spillway capacity: 3,540 cubic metres per second (125,000 cu ft/s)

Reservoir
- Creates: Khancoban Reservoir
- Total capacity: 26,643 megalitres (940.9×10^{6} cu ft)
- Catchment area: 788 square kilometres (304 sq mi)
- Surface area: 4,694 hectares (11,600 acres)

Khancoban Dam is a major ungated earthfill embankment dam with a controlled spillway across the Swampy Plain River in the Snowy Mountains region of New South Wales, Australia. The dam's main purpose is for the generation of hydro-power and is one of the sixteen major dams that comprise the Snowy Mountains Scheme, a vast hydroelectricity and irrigation complex constructed in south-east Australia between 1949 and 1974 and now run by Snowy Hydro.

The impounded reservoir is called the Khancoban Reservoir.

== Location and features ==
Completed in 1965, Khancoban Dam is a major dam, located within the Snowy Valleys local government area, approximately 2 kilometres (1.2 mi) southwest of the town of Khancoban. The dam was constructed by Kaiser Engineers and Construction Incorporation based on engineering plans developed under contract from the Snowy Mountains Hydroelectric Authority.

Built on a soil foundation, the dam wall comprises 629,100 cubic metres (22,220,000 cu ft) of earthfill with an internal core, and is 18 metres (59 ft) high and 1,067 metres (3,501 ft) long. At 100% capacity the dam wall holds back 26,643 megalitres (940.9×10^{6} cu ft) of water. The surface area of Khancoban Reservoir is 469 hectares (1,160 acres) and the catchment area is 788 square kilometres (304 sq mi). The controlled spillway is capable of discharging 3,540 cubic metres per second (125,000 cu ft/s).

Located immediately upstream of the Khancoban Reservoir is the Murray 2 Power Station, a 550 megawatts (740,000 hp) conventional hydroelectric power station. Water from the power plant is discharged into the reservoir, before passing over the spillway of Khancoban Dam, and down the Swampy Plain River.

== See also ==
- Kosciuszko National Park
- List of dams and reservoirs in New South Wales
- Snowy Hydro Limited
- Snowy Mountains Scheme
- Snowy Scheme Museum
