= Angaston Power Station =

- Country: Australia
- Location: Angaston, South Australia
- Coordinates: 34.503°S 139.025°E
- Status: Operational
- Commission date: 2005
- Owner: Snowy Hydro
- Operator: Cummins Power Generation

Thermal power station
- Primary fuel: Diesel

Power generation
- Units operational: 30
- Make and model: Cummins QSK60
- Nameplate capacity: 50 MW

External links
- Website: www.snowyhydro.com.au/our-energy/gas/diesel/

Angaston Power Station is a diesel-powered electricity generator in the Barossa Valley region of South Australia near the town of Angaston. It is owned and operated by Snowy Hydro since 2014. It consists of 30 diesel reciprocating engines generating up to 50 MW of electricity to meet peak demands in the National Electricity Market.

The power station was designed and built by Cummins Power Generation under contract from Infratil in 2005. At the time, it was Australia's largest and lowest-emission diesel power station. It achieves low emissions through selective catalytic reduction technology, spraying urea into the exhaust.

Snowy Hydro bought assets from Infratil in 2014. These included Lumo Energy, Direct Connect and three diesel peaking generators for a total of 136 MW. The other two were the Lonsdale Power Station and the Port Stanvac Power Station.
