= King George Central =

Office building in Brisbane, Australia

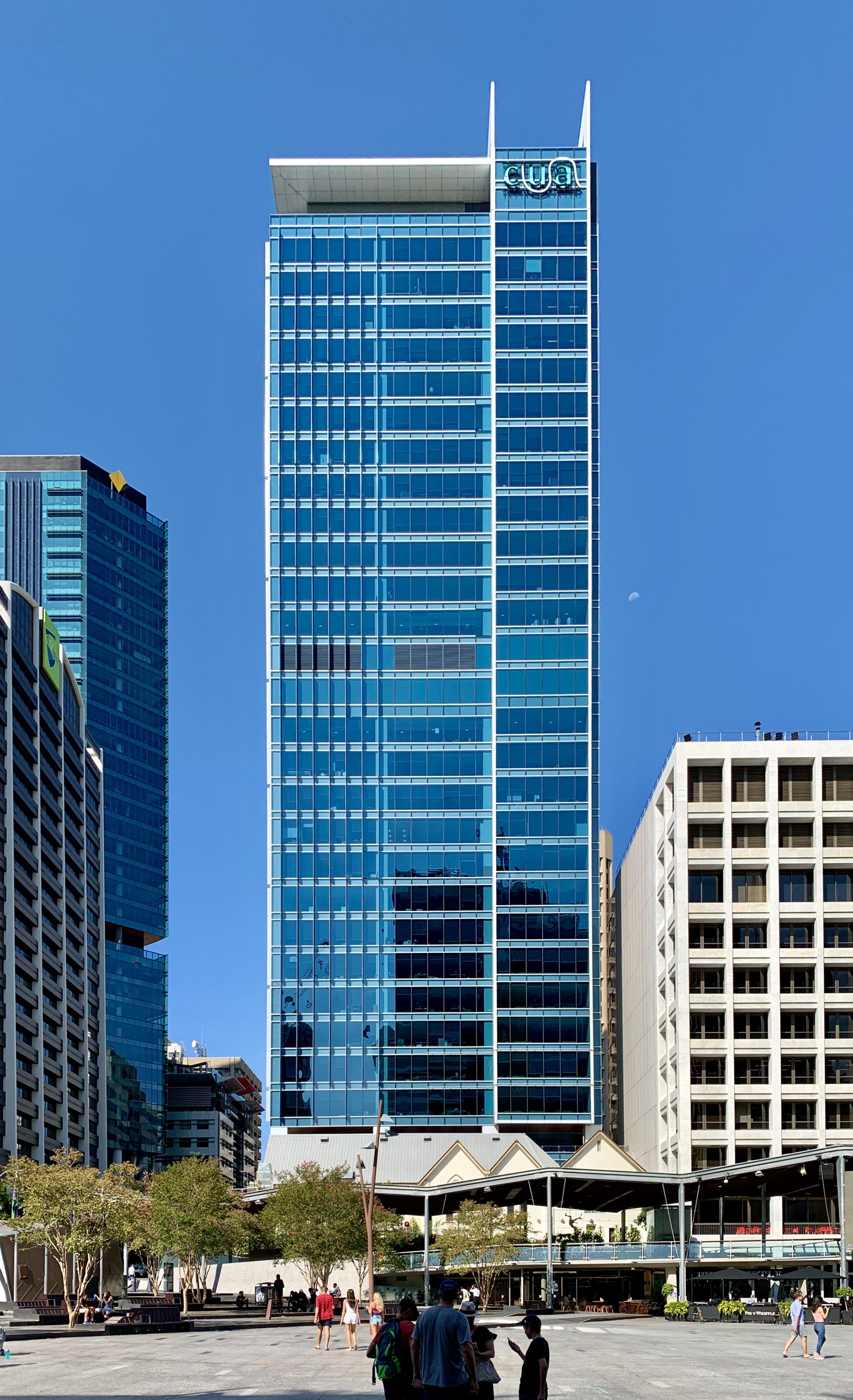
- King George Central in January 2020

General information
- Status: Completed
- Location: 145 Ann Street, Brisbane, Queensland, Australia
- Coordinates: 27.467878°S 153.024829°E
- Groundbreaking: December 2009
- Opening: October 2012
- Cost: $123 million
- Owner: Aware Super

Height
- Roof: 129 m (423 ft)

Technical details
- Floor count: 27
- Floor area: 28,000 m^{2} (300,000 sq ft)
- Lifts/elevators: 12

Design and construction
- Architect: ML Design
- Developer: Leighton Properties
- Main contractor: Thiess

Website
- 145ann.com.au

King George Central is a skyscraper in Brisbane, Queensland, Australia. The modern style office building is located next to Ann Street Presbyterian Church in the Golden Triangle and the emerging North Quarter Precinct of the Brisbane central business district in close proximity to the King George Square and Queen Elizabeth II Courts of Law. Developed by Leighton Properties with Thiess as the lead contractor, construction commenced in December 2009.

It was initially owned by the Commonwealth Property Office Fund. In November 2024 the building was sold by Dexus to Aware Super.
