= Laverton North Power Station =

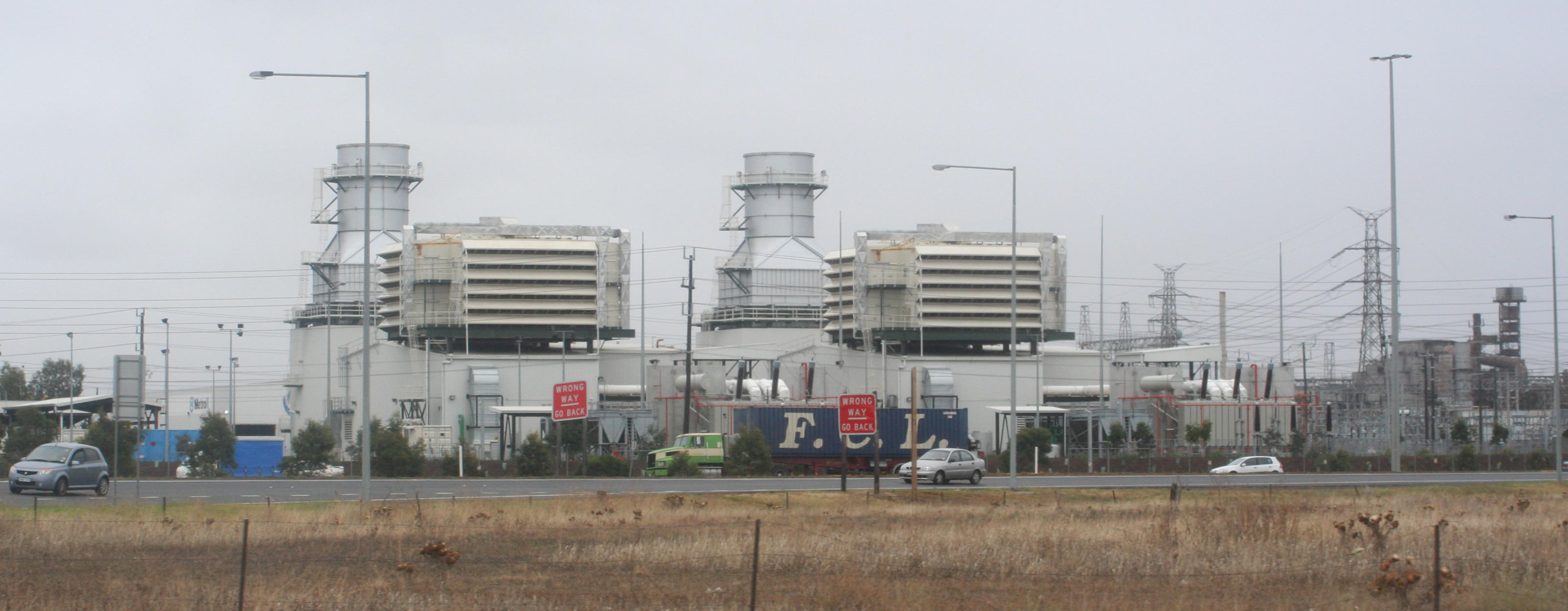
- Laverton North Power Station from the south. Princes Freeway in the foreground
- Country: Australia
- Location: Laverton North, Victoria
- Coordinates: 37°50′28″S 144°47′20″E
- Status: Operational
- Commission date: 2006
- Owner: Snowy Hydro Limited

Thermal power station
- Primary fuel: Natural gas
- Turbine technology: Turbine

Power generation
- Units operational: 2 x 163MW
- Nameplate capacity: 320 MW

External links
- Commons: Related media on Commons

Laverton North Power Station is a natural gas-powered plant, owned and operated by Snowy Hydro Limited. It is situated in Laverton North, on the south-western outskirts of Melbourne, Victoria, approximately 15 km from the Melbourne Central Business District. It is a peaking power plant, particularly constructed to cater for the growth in Victoria's summer electricity demand, and can be rapidly activated when required.

The station has two open-cycle gas turbines that together can generate a total of 320 MW of electricity. The turbines are primarily fuelled by natural gas supplied from the Brooklyn-Lara gas pipeline but, in the event of a gas supply curtailment, they can burn low sulphur emission heavy oil as a backup fuel. The plant is normally operated remotely from Snowy Hydro Limited's central control room in Cooma, New South Wales, but is also equipped to be run locally.

Snowy Hydro contracted Siemens to complete the engineering, procurement and construction (EPC) for the project. Initial civil works started in October 2004 and the station was commissioned in December 2006.

The original licence only allowed the power station to operate for 10% of the year, but in May 2007 Snowy Hydro applied for an emergency extension of operating hours because a drought had affected hydro energy supplies. The Victorian Civil and Administrative Tribunal issued an interim order that the plant remain shut down on weekdays between 8am to 5pm, due to neighbouring offices being affected by the level of noise and vibration. However, the order was lifted in July 2007.
