= Thiess Pty Ltd =

Australian-based international mining services company

- Formerly: Thiess Bros
- Type: Subsidiary
- Industry: Mining services
- Founded: 1933
- Founder: Henry Horn and Leslie Thiess
- Headquarters: Brisbane, Australia
- Area served: Australia; Canada; Chile; India; Indonesia; Mongolia; South Africa
- Number of employees: 12,000 (2021)
- Parent: CIMIC Group (60%); Elliott Advisors (40%)
- Subsidiaries: Thiess Contractors Indonesia
- Website: thiess.com

Thiess Pty Ltd is an international mining services company based in Brisbane, Australia. Established in the 1930s as Horn & Thiess, the company later became Thiess Bros and Thiess Contractors before being bought by Leighton Holdings in 1983. Thiess' headquarters are located in the Thiess Centre in South Bank.

Following restructuring within CIMIC in 2014 and the merger of several international Leighton businesses into Thiess, the company claims to have become the largest contract mining services provider in the world.

== History ==
Thiess was founded as Horn & Thiess in 1933 by Henry Horn and Leslie Thiess with headquarters in Toowoomba. Initially the business focused on road-building and earth moving but subsequently expanded into dam construction, open cut mining and other forms of civil engineering. After other members of the Thiess family bought Horn out, it was renamed Thiess Bros.

In 1951 Thiess was listed on the Sydney and Brisbane stock exchanges.

After importing Toyota Land Cruisers into Australia for the Snowy Mountains Scheme in 1959, Thiess became the Toyota commercial vehicle franchisee in Australia. A 40% shareholding in Thiess Toyota was sold to Toyota Australia in 1968, with the remaining stake being sold in 1980. From 1967 until 1970, Thiess was also the distributor of White Motor Company products in Australia.

In February 1980, Thiess was taken over by CSR in a hostile takeover. In April 1981, the construction division was sold to a consortium of Hochtief (50%), Westfield Group (25%) and Leslie Thiess (25%). In July 1983 Thiess was acquired by Leighton Holdings, with Hochtief becoming the majority shareholder in Leighton Holdings.

In 1987 Thiess diversified into waste collection establishing Thiess Waste Management Services. This was sold in July 2012 to Remondis.

In 2011, the business was inducted into the Queensland Business Leaders Hall of Fame.

In 2014, the mining operations of Leighton Africa, Leighton Asia and Leighton Contractors were merged into the company. In 2016 Thiess's civil engineering business was merged into Leighton Contractors which was renamed CPB Contractors. Since then Thiess has been entirely focused on mining projects.

In 2021, CIMIC sold a 50% share in Thiess to Elliott Advisors. In April 2024, CIMIC exercised a put option to increase its shareholding to 60%. CIMIC has an option that expires in December 2026 to increase its shareholding back to 100%.

== Major projects ==
Major projects undertaken by Thiess include:

- Leichhardt Dam, Queensland, completed in 1958
- Tooma Dam, Snowy Mountains, completed in 1961
- Geehi Dam, Snowy Mountains, completed in 1966
- Murray Two Dam, Snowy Mountains, completed in 1968
- Corin Dam, Australian Capital Territory, completed in 1968
- Talbingo Dam, Snowy Mountains, completed in 1971
- Dartmouth Dam, Victoria, completed in 1979
- Googong Dam, New South Wales, completed in 1979
- Splityard Creek Dam, Queensland, completed in 1980
- Sugarloaf Dam, Christmas Hills, completed in 1981
- Wivenhoe Dam, Queensland, completed in 1985
- Lake Awoonga Dam, Queensland, completed 1985
- Hayman Island Resort, Queensland, completed in 1987
- Chimneys at Loy Yang Power Station, Victoria, completed in 1988
- Redcliffe Bridge, Western Australia, completed in 1988
- HM Prison Barwon, Victoria, completed in 1989
- Newman to Port Hedland section of the Great Northern Highway, completed in 1990
- Junee Correctional Centre, New South Wales, completed in 1991
- Sydney Harbour Tunnel, completed in 1992
- Fulham Correctional Centre, Victoria, completed in 1997
- Windan Bridge, Western Australia, completed in 2000
- Lane Cove Tunnel, Sydney, completed in 2007
- EastLink, Melbourne, completed in 2008
- 400 George Street, Brisbane, completed in 2009
- Epping to Chatswood rail link, Sydney, completed in 2009
- UQ Lakes to Buranda section of the Eastern Busway, Queensland, completed in 2009
- Airport Flyover, Brisbane, completed in 2011
- Stage 3 of the Hinze Dam, Queensland, completed in 2011
- Redevelopment of Royal North Shore Hospital, Sydney, completed in 2011
- King George Central, Brisbane, completed in 2012
- Windsor to Kedron section of the Northern Busway, Brisbane, completed in 2012
- Airport Link, Brisbane, completed in 2012
- Victorian Desalination Plant, Wonthaggi, completed in 2012
- Hunter Expressway, New South Wales, completed in 2014
- Footscray to Deer Park, Regional Rail Link, Melbourne, completed in 2015
