= Ann Street Presbyterian Church =

Heritage-listed church in Brisbane, Queensland

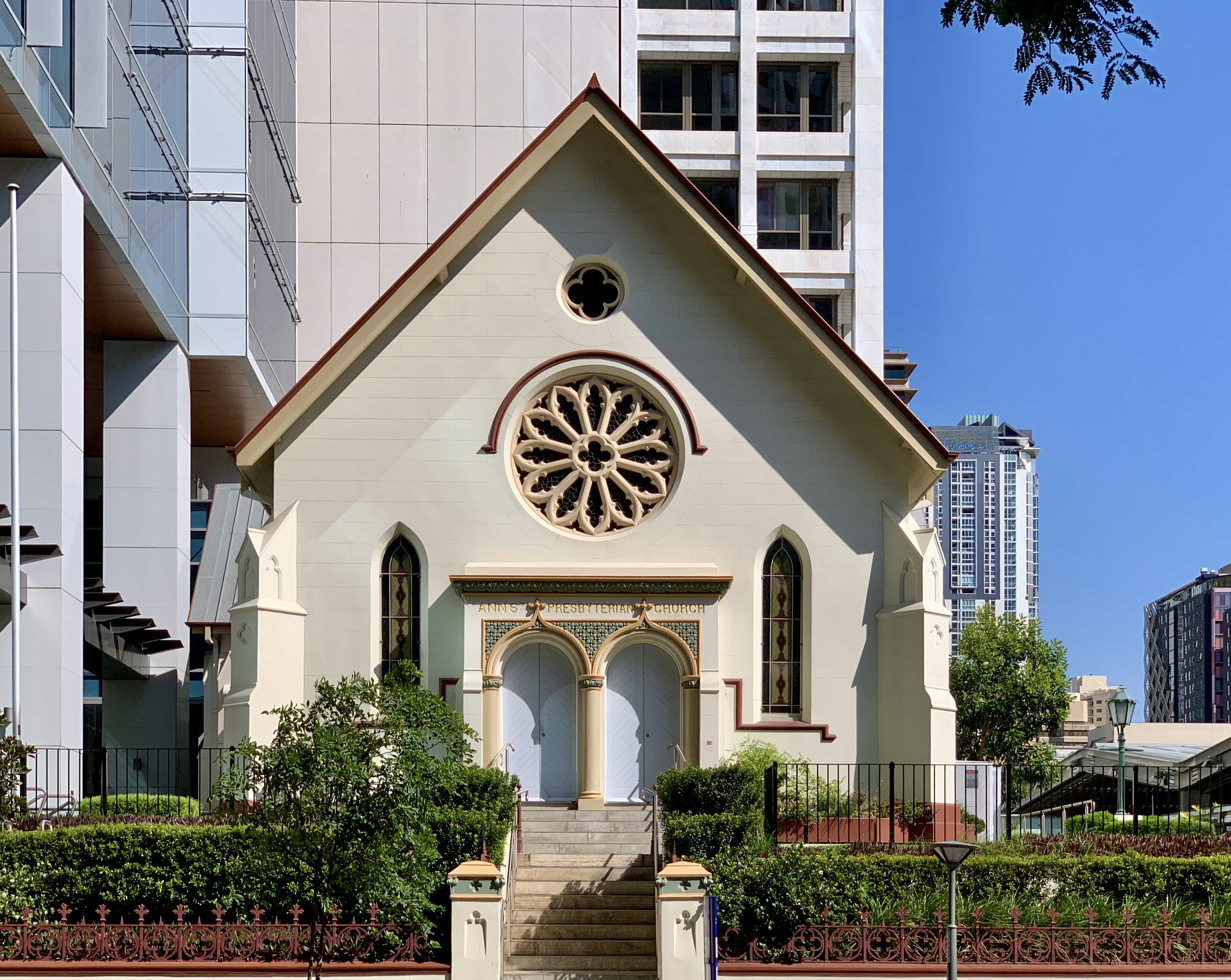
- Ann Street Presbyterian Church, 2020
- Ann Street Presbyterian Church
- 27.468°S 153.0244°E
- Address: 141 Ann Street, Brisbane City, City of Brisbane, Queensland
- Country: Australia
- Denomination: Presbyterian
- Website: annstreetpcq.org.au

History
- Status: Church
- Founded: September 1854 (first church)

Architecture
- Architects: Joshua Jeays (1854); John Hall (1873); Alexander Brown Wilson (1897); Douglas Roberts (1936)
- Architectural type: Church
- Years built: 1858, 1871, 1897, 1936

Administration
- Division: Queensland

Clergy
- Pastor: Linden Fooks

Queensland Heritage Register
- Official name: Ann Street Presbyterian Church
- Type: State heritage (built)
- Designated: 21 October 1992
- Reference no.: 600071
- Significant period: 1858, 1873, 1897 (fabric)
- Significant components: Steps/stairway, wall/s, furniture/fittings, pipe organ
- Builders: Joshua Jeays

Ann Street Presbyterian Church is a heritage-listed Presbyterian church at 141 Ann Street, Brisbane City, City of Brisbane, Queensland, Australia. It was built in 1858 by Joshua Jeays, altered and extended in 1897 to a design by Alexander Brown Wilson with further extensions designed by Douglas Francis Woodcraft Roberts in 1936. The church was added to the Queensland Heritage Register on 21 October 1992.

== History ==
The first major contingent of Presbyterians to arrive in Queensland came as part of John Dunmore Lang's immigration scheme in the late 1840s. The first Presbyterian services were conducted in a house at Kangaroo Point until 1851 when a small timber church was opened at South Brisbane. For the benefit of North Brisbane residents, services were also conducted in the School of Arts building on the corner of Queen and Creek streets.

=== First church building ===
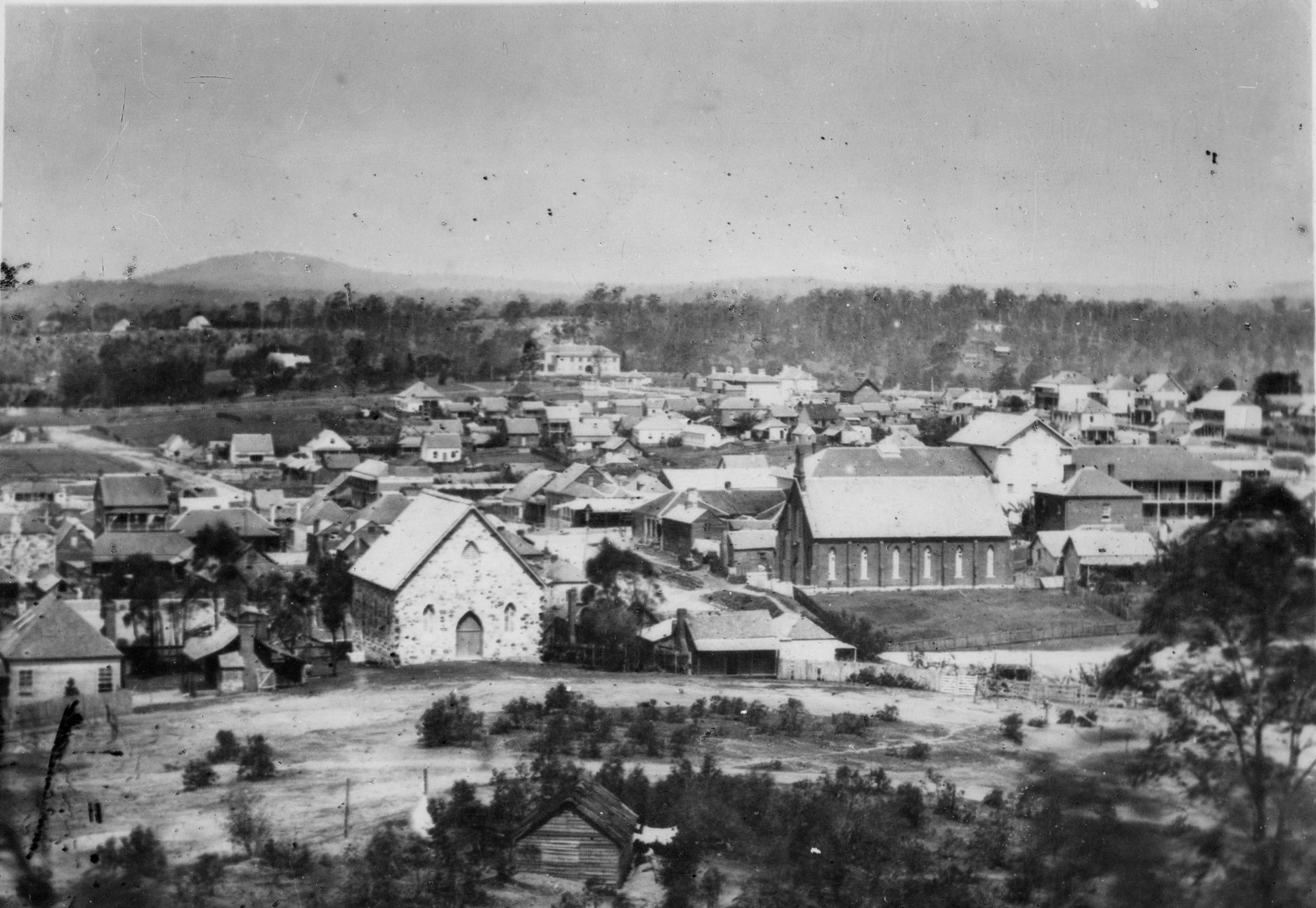
The first Ann Street Presbyterian Church (the Reverend Ogg's church) in the left of this photo, circa 1862. The church on the right is the 2nd Albert Street Wesleyan Church (which is a predecessor of the current Albert Street Uniting Church but not on the same site)

In September 1854, the congregation purchased three allotments in Ann Street. Four years later, a simple stone building in the Gothic style was erected by Joshua Jeays for a cost of £960. It was 36 by 47 feet (11 by 14 m). The church was opened on Sunday 25 July 1858 and became known as the Ann Street Presbyterian Church. On Thursday 21 December 1871, a fire destroyed all but the stone walls of the church, which was not insured.

=== Second church building ===
In February 1872, a public appeal was launched to raise funds to rebuild the church. In February 1873, Mr E. Lewis was contracted to rebuild the church to the plans of architect John Hall. The new church was officially reopened on Sunday 26 October 1873. Due to the generosity of donors, it was possible to not just rebuild the church but to add a turret, stained glass windows, and a church bell described as being one of the finest bells in Brisbane.

In 1897, major alterations and additions were undertaken. Designed by Alexander Brown Wilson, the work included the addition of buttresses, double transepts, a basement, the construction of stone steps and fence at the front, plastering of the exterior, and the installation of a rose window in the front wall. Further work was undertaken to the interior in 1903 to accommodate and a new organ, and between 1903–14 a third transept was added.

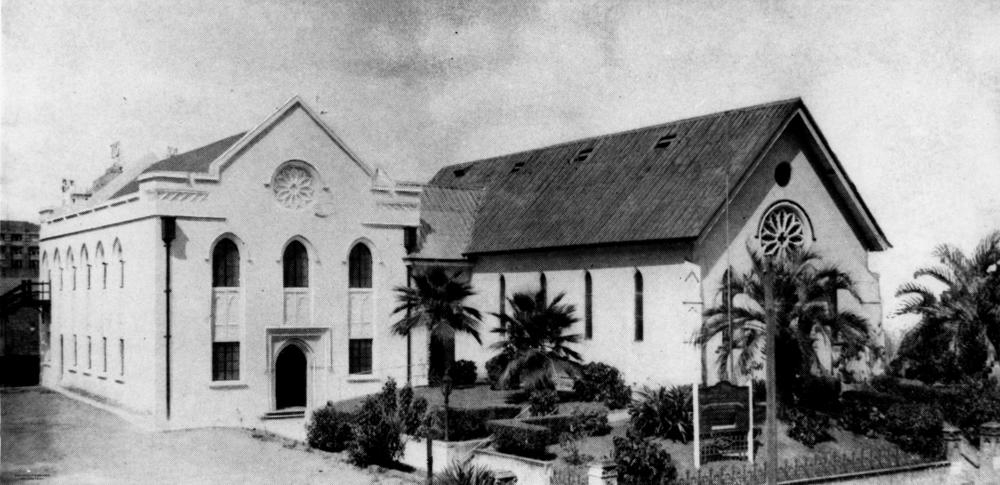
Ann Street Presbyterian Church (right), pre-1955

In 1936, a two storeyed extension, adjoining the northern end of the transepts, was built. Designed by Douglas Francis Woodcraft Roberts it comprised hall and offices. As well as offices for the parish it also contained the central offices of the Presbyterian Church in Queensland. Buttressing was also added to either side of the front of the building to match that on the later transepts. This work was completed for a cost of £6,000.

During the mid 1960s, the future of the church was threatened when the Brisbane City Council sought to acquire the site as part of the redevelopment of King George Square. Church and community pressure, however, ensured the survival of the building, although the extension was subsumed in the construction of 145 Ann Street, King George Central.

== Description ==
Ann Street Presbyterian Church is a rendered stone and brick building set well above Ann Street and King George Square with an ornate render and cast iron wall and steps down to Ann Street. The roof, of ribbed galvanised iron, consists of a series of steeply pitched gables. The windows are generally tall lancets, with a few rounded-headed ones. The front elevation contains two portal doors inset within semi-circular arches with ogival mouldings and patterned decoration in the render, and a rose window above. The words "Ann St. Presbyterian Church" are set in render above the door.

Timber detailing, fittings and furnishings feature prominently in the interior. The ceiling comprises diagonal boarding with regularly spaced fretwork panels above exposed timber trusses. Broad timber arches are located along the side walls of the transepts. A timber screen divides the entrance porch from the main body of the church. The floor slopes gradually down from the entry to the communion table, elders court and pulpit. A large pipe organ dominates the eastern wall.

A two storeyed rendered masonry building which contains a hall and offices is attached to the church at the northern transept (demolished).

The 1936 hall and offices and the third transept of the church do not form part of the listing (demolished).

== Heritage listing ==
Ann Street Presbyterian Church was listed on the Queensland Heritage Register on 21 October 1992 having satisfied the following criteria.

The place is important in demonstrating the evolution or pattern of Queensland's history.

The Ann Street Presbyterian Church is significant as one of the oldest churches still in use in Queensland, it is important in demonstrating the pattern of development of churches in Queensland's history.

The place is important in demonstrating the principal characteristics of a particular class of cultural places.

The building demonstrates the principal characteristics of the Presbyterian tradition as a church building, with a harmonious sequence of later additions.

The place is important because of its aesthetic significance.

The church is important in exhibiting particular aesthetic characteristics valued by the community including the quality and intactness of the interior of the church and the contribution the church makes to the townscape and to King George Square.

The place has a strong or special association with a particular community or cultural group for social, cultural or spiritual reasons.

As the site of continuous Presbyterian worship since 1858, the Ann Street Presbyterian Church has a strong and special association with the Presbyterian community for social, cultural and spiritual reasons.

The place has a special association with the life or work of a particular person, group or organisation of importance in Queensland's history.

The church has a special association with architect Alexander Brown Wilson who was associated with the Presbyterian church.
