= Swampy Plain River =

Coordinates: 36.1816°S 148.0230°E

Swampy Plain River Swampy Plains River, East Branch (Murray) River, Murray River, Geehi Creek, Cootapatamba Creek

Location
- Country: Australia
- State: New South Wales
- Region: Australian Alps (IBRA), Snowy Mountains
- Local government area: Snowy Valleys

Physical characteristics
- Source: Snowy Mountains
  - location: below Mount Kosciuszko
  - elevation: 2,120 m (6,960 ft)
- Mouth: Murray River
  - location: near Khancoban
  - elevation: 263 m (863 ft)
- Length: 59 km (37 mi)

Basin features
- River system: Murray catchment, Murray–Darling basin
- Tributaries
  - right: Geehi River
- Reservoir: Lake Cootapatamba

Swampy Plain River (and in some places Swampy Plains River), a perennial stream that is part of the Murray catchment within the Murray–Darling basin, is located in the Snowy Mountains bioregion of New South Wales, Australia.

== Course and features ==
The river rises on the southern slopes of Mount Kosciuszko within the Kosciuszko National Park and, at an elevation of 2,120 metres (6,960 ft), is believed to be the highest river in Australia. From its headwaters, the river flows generally south, north and north west, joined by nine tributaries including the Geehi River, before reaching its confluence with the Murray River, near Khancoban, upstream from the Bringenbrong Bridge, descending 1,860 metres (6,100 ft) over its 59 kilometres (37 mi) course.

Swampy Plain River is impounded by Lake Cootapatamba close to its source, and by Khancoban Dam, close to its mouth. Located immediately upstream of the Khancoban Reservoir is the Murray-2 Power Station, a 550 megawatts (740,000 hp) conventional hydroelectric power station. Water from the power plant is discharged into the reservoir, before passing over the spillway of Khancoban Dam, and down the Swampy Plain River.

The river passes near the towns of Geehi and Khancoban.

The river is a popular place for fly fishing, with a significant stock of brown and rainbow trout.

The historic and iconic Hannel's Spur Track leads up from a signed trailhead near the Swampy Plains River to the very summit of Mount Kosciuszko. The trailhead is near the confluence of the Swampy Plains River and the Geehi River – this is the overlooked 3rd route to the summit of Australia's highest mountain.

== See also ==
- Rivers of New South Wales
- List of rivers of Australia
- Snowy Mountains Scheme
