= Lumo Energy =

Australian energy retailer

- Type: Private
- Industry: Energy
- Founded: 2010, Victoria Electricity (2002), South Australia Electricity (2005), Queensland Electricity (2005), NSW Electricity (2006)
- Headquarters: Cremorne, Victoria
- Products: Gas and electricity
- Parent: Snowy Hydro
- Website: lumoenergy.com.au

Lumo Energy is an Australian energy retailer operating in Victoria and South Australia which has been wholly owned by Snowy Hydro since 2014. The company offers electricity and gas services in Victoria and South Australia. As of October 2017, the company had almost 500,000 customers and a workforce of just under 500 people.

== History ==
Infratil registered as Victoria Electricity in 2002 and secured an electricity retail licence for the state of Victoria in August 2002. Victoria Electricity commenced retailing electricity in February 2004. On 1 October 2002, the gas market in Victoria was opened to new gas retailers and full retail contestability for gas customers was introduced, enabling gas retailers to seek customers statewide. Victoria Electricity applied for and obtained a licence for gas retailing in Victoria in December 2004 and commenced gas retailing in early 2005. In May 2005, Infratil also registered South Australia Electricity and Queensland Electricity and New South Wales Electricity in August 2006.

In June 2010, Lumo Energy was incorporated as a company and as a business name in each of the four states in which it was active. In July 2011, Lumo partnered with American Express to offer the Lumo Express product, and in September 2011 it partnered with the Velocity Frequent Flyer program to offer the Lumo Velocity product.

In 2014, Infratil sold Lumo Energy, along with Direct Connect, to government-owned Snowy Hydro for $600 million.

In July 2016, Lumo began to migrate customers in New South Wales to Red Energy and, in 2017, the same process began with customers in Queensland.

== Customer satisfaction ==
In 2010, the Queensland Competition Authority found Lumo Energy had the highest rate of unresolved complaints among the state's electricity retailers. In 2011, Lumo Energy lost a court case involving a customer whose gas and electricity were cut off over a $4,000 debt. According to the Victorian Essential Services Commission, Lumo Energy sent the customer an initial letter which failed to mention separate disconnection periods for gas and electricity notices, as required by law.

In 2013, Lumo Energy announced it had made changes to improve customer relations, launching a new website and refreshing its customer communications. It also reported progress in the reduction of Ombudsman complaints, with a 53% reduction in complaints received in June 2013, compared with June 2010. In August 2013, Lumo Energy was awarded the number one position for electricity in the Roy Morgan Customer Satisfaction Awards.

== See also ==
- Energy in Australia
