= Geehi River =

Coordinates: 36°17′S 148°18′E

Geehi River Swampy Plain River, Rocky Plain Creek

Location
- Country: Australia
- State: New South Wales
- Region: Australian Alps (IBRA), Snowy Mountains
- Local government area: Snowy Valleys Council

Physical characteristics
- Source: Strumbo Range, Snowy Mountains
  - location: below Mount Jagungal
  - elevation: 1,890 m (6,200 ft)
- Mouth: confluence with the Swampy Plain River
  - location: near Mount Youngal
  - elevation: 1,130 m (3,710 ft)
- Length: 47 km (29 mi)

Basin features
- River system: Murray catchment, Murray–Darling basin
- Tributaries
  - left: Valentine Creek, Three Rocks Creek, Kosciuszko Creek
- National park: Kosciuszko NP

The Geehi River, a perennial river of the Murray catchment of the Murray–Darling basin, is located in the Snowy Mountains region of New South Wales, Australia.

== Course and features ==
The Geehi River rises below Mount Jagungal, part of Strumbo Range within the Kosciuszko National Park, and flows generally southwest before reaching its confluence with the Swampy Plain River, below Mount Youngal, near the locality of Geehi. The river descends 1,450 metres (4,760 ft) over its 47 kilometres (29 mi) course.

The Alpine Way road crosses the Geehi River near its confluence with the Swampy Plain River. The historic and iconic Hannels Spur Track up to the summit of Mt. Kosciuszko commences near the confluence of the Geehi River and the Swampy Plains River. This is the overlooked 3rd and most challenging route to the summit of Australia's highest mountain and Australia's biggest vertical ascent – 1800 metres.

== See also ==
- List of rivers of New South Wales (A–K)
- List of rivers of Australia
- Rivers of New South Wales
- Snowy Mountains Scheme
