= Snowy Hydro =

Australian hydroelectric power company

Snowy Hydro Limited
- Formerly: Snowy Mountains Hydro-electric Authority
- Type: Corporation
- Industry: Energy
- Founded: 1949; 77 years ago
- Founder: Government of Australia; Government of New South Wales; Government of Victoria
- Headquarters: Cooma, New South Wales, Australia
- Area served: New South Wales; Victoria; Queensland; South Australia; Australian Capital Territory
- Key people: David Knox (Chairman); Dennis Barnes (CEO)
- Products: Electricity generation
- Services: Electricity retailing, bulk water management
- Revenue: $3.5 billion (2021/22)
- Net income: $295 million (2021/22)
- Number of employees: 1,726 (2022)
- Parent: Government of Australia
- Subsidiaries: Red Energy; Valley Power Peaking Facility
- Website: www.snowyhydro.com.au

Snowy Hydro Limited is an electricity generation and retailing company in Australia that owns, manages, and maintains the Snowy Mountains Hydro-electric Scheme that consists of nine hydro-electric power stations and sixteen large dams connected by 145 kilometres (90 mi) of tunnels and 80 kilometres (50 mi) of aqueducts located mainly in the Kosciuszko National Park. Snowy Hydro also owns and operates two gas-fired power stations in Victoria and one in New South Wales, three diesel power stations in South Australia and owns two electricity retailing businesses, Red Energy and Lumo Energy.

The company is owned by the Government of Australia and whilst not a statutory corporation, is established by the Snowy Mountains Hydro-electric Power Act 1949 (Cth). Prior to its incorporation under the Corporations Act 2001 (Cth), the company was previously known as Snowy Mountains Hydro-electric Authority.

== Generating assets ==
The company manages the Snowy Mountains Scheme that generates on average around 4,500 gigawatt hours of clean, renewable energy each year, which was around 37% of all renewable energy in the mainland National Electricity Market in 2010.

The company also owns a 300 MW gas-fired peaking power station in the Latrobe Valley, a 320 MW gas-fired peaking power station at Laverton North near Melbourne, and a 667 MW gas-fired peaking power station at Colongra on the Central Coast of New South Wales. It also owns three diesel-powered peaking power stations in South Australia providing 136 MW between them. The company's production assets are summarised in the table below. These assets are used to generate electricity for sale under contract to the National Electricity Market.

Name	Fuel	Type	Location	Maximum Capacity (MW)	Commissioned
Angaston	Diesel	Internal combustion	Angaston	50	2005
Blowering	Hydro	Francis Turbine	Blowering Dam	80	1969
Guthega	Hydro	Francis Turbine	Near Guthega	60	1955
Jindabyne Dam	Mini Hydro	Turbo-pump	Jindabyne	1.1	2011
Jounama	Small Hydro	Turbo-pump	Near Jounama	14.4	2010
Laverton North	Natural gas	Gas turbines	Laverton North	320	2006
Lonsdale	Diesel	Internal combustion	Lonsdale	21	2002
Murray 1	Hydro	Francis Turbine	Near Khancoban	950	1967
Murray 2	Hydro	Francis Turbine	Near Khancoban	550	1969
Port Stanvac	Diesel	Internal combustion	Lonsdale	65	2011
Tumut 1	Hydro	Francis Turbine	Near Cabramurra	330	1959
Tumut 2	Hydro	Francis Turbine	Near Cabramurra	286	1962
Tumut 3	Hydro	Francis Turbine	Talbingo	1,500	1973
Tumut 3	Micro Hydro	Turbo-pump	Talbingo	0.720	2003
Valley Power	Natural gas	Gas turbines	Traralgon	300	2002
Colongra	Natural gas	Gas turbines	Colongra	667	2009

== Water storage and diversion ==
As part of the company's responsibilities for managing the Snowy Mountain Scheme, Snowy Hydro Limited also collects, stores, and diverts water for irrigation from the Snowy Mountains catchment west to the Murray and Murrumbidgee River systems under what is called the Snowy Water Licence. Granted as part of the Snowy Hydro Corporatisation Act 1997 (NSW) for fixed five-year terms, this licence prescribes the rights and obligations on the company with respect to the collection, diversion, storage, use, and release of water within the Snowy area. The Snowy Water Licence also imposes some obligations on the company in terms of releasing environmental flows east into the Snowy River and other rivers in the Snowy Mountains region.

== Proposed public divestment ==
In December 2005, the Government of New South Wales announced it would sell its 58% share in Snowy Hydro, expecting to yield A$1 billion. The federal and Victorian governments had followed suit, announcing by mid-February 2006 the intent to sell their 13% and 29% respectively, with A$1.7 billion (ranging up to A$3 billion) expectations through a public float. Pre-registration for shares in Snowy Hydro opened in mid May and it was expected that the float would take place some time in July. Over 200,000 people pre-registered to purchase shares in the company over two weeks.

On 2 June 2006, the federal government announced that it would no longer sell its 13% stake in the project, effectively forcing the hands of the New South Wales and Victorian governments to follow suit. The aborted sale followed strong opposition from the public, including government MPs and prominent Australians.

In February 2014 the National Commission of Audit recommended in its Phase One Report that the federal government sell its interest in Snowy Hydro. In March 2018, the federal government bought out the New South Wales and Victorian government shareholdings.

== Current market position ==
Since privatisation was cancelled in 2006, the company has continued to grow with investment into Snowy Scheme modernisation projects, cloud seeding, development of mini hydro opportunities such as the 14 MW Jounama mini-hydro (commissioned in 2010) and growth of its retailing business, Red Energy. In September 2014 Snowy Hydro purchased gas and electricity retailer Lumo Energy for $600 million. Red Energy currently has 1.6 million electricity and gas customers.

In addition Snowy Hydro has developed its gas-fired power station portfolio to reduce risks to the business due to its reliance on water as an energy source, and the potential impact of transmission constraints on the ability of the remote Snowy Mountains hydro generation assets to access the electricity grid. In January 2015 Snowy Hydro acquired the gas-fired Colongra Power Station in New South Wales.

== See also ==
- Snowy 2.0 Pumped Storage Power Station
