= Hobbys Yards, New South Wales =

Hobbys Yards
- Town
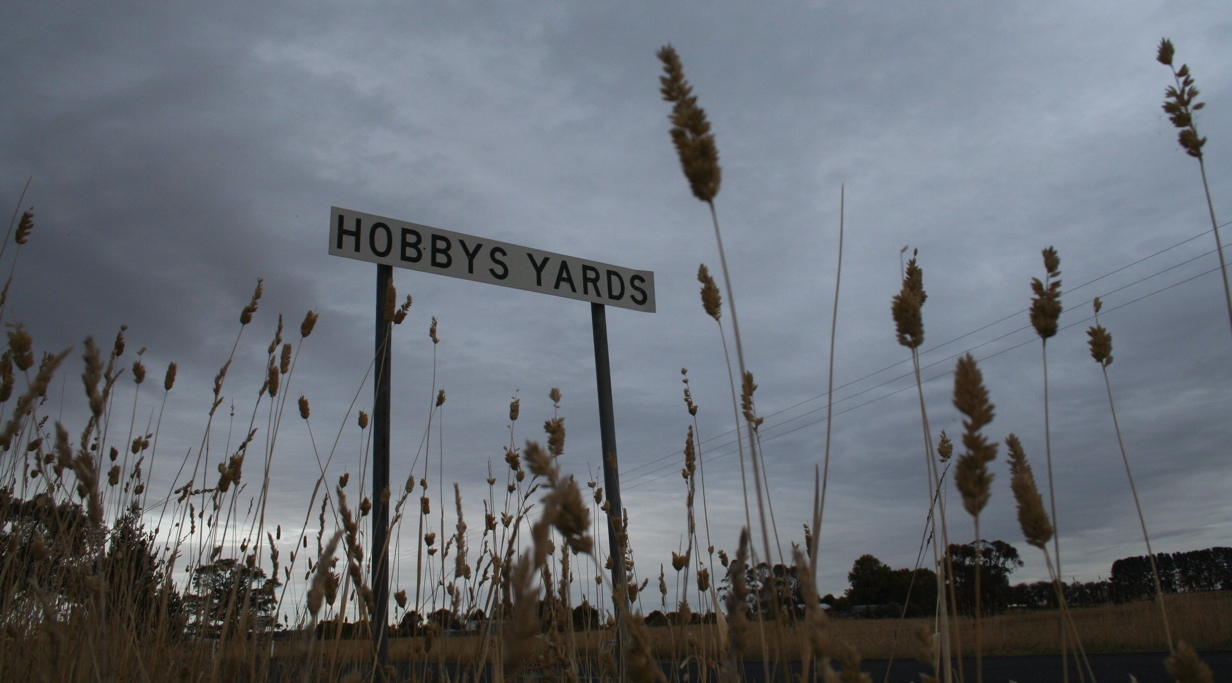
- A sign greets visitors to Hobbys Yards

- Coordinates: 33°42′S 149°19′E
- Country: Australia
- State: New South Wales
- Region: Central West
- LGA: Blayney Shire Council
- Location: 40 km (25 mi) from Bathurst

Government
  - State electorate: Bathurst
  - Federal division: Calare
- Elevation: 970 m (3,180 ft)

Population
  - Total: 198 (locality) (2006 census)
- Postcodes: 2795 (the village), 2799 (western end of the locality)

Hobbys Yards is a small village in the Central West region of New South Wales, Australia, in Blayney Shire. It is situated within an hour's driving time from the regional centres, townships, villages of Bathurst, Barry, Blayney, Neville and Trunkey Creek. At the 2006 census, Hobbys Yards locality had a population of 89 people, most of them living on neighbouring farms. The village is named after Thomas Hobby who accompanied John Oxley on his exploration expeditions, or his son.

By road it is 18 minutes (20 km on the bitumen) from Blayney, which contains the chambers of the local shire council, a public library, and the nearest supermarket, 40 minutes (40 km) from Bathurst, which contains most facilities and whose postcode covers Hobbys Yards, and 10 minutes from Newbridge, the closest railway station (but currently without a passenger service) and pub. All of these roads are sealed but subject to frost and occasionally snow or at other times to flooding, and to the hazard of hitting a kangaroo or wombat particularly at or after dusk. The nearest service stations are also at Blayney, one of them offering unmanned 24-hour service by credit card.

The entire locality is within Blayney Shire, but all but the westernmost farms are in the Bathurst postal district and so have its postcode. It is served by the Barry Hobbys Yards Rural Fire Brigade, who are based at nearby Barry but who maintain a water tank at the Hobbys Yards Community Hall.

== Heritage buildings ==
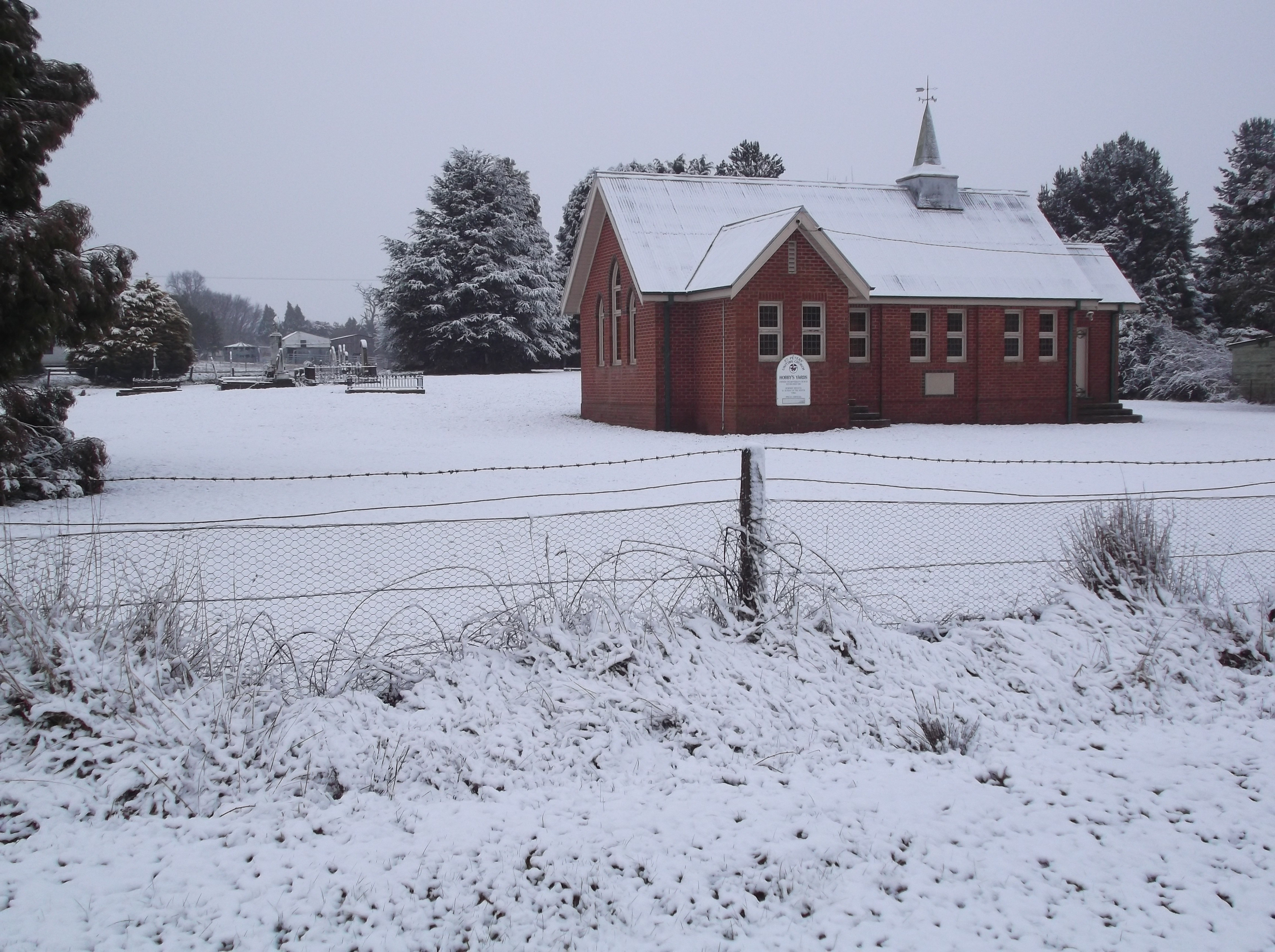
St Peters Uniting Church in winter 2015, from the North

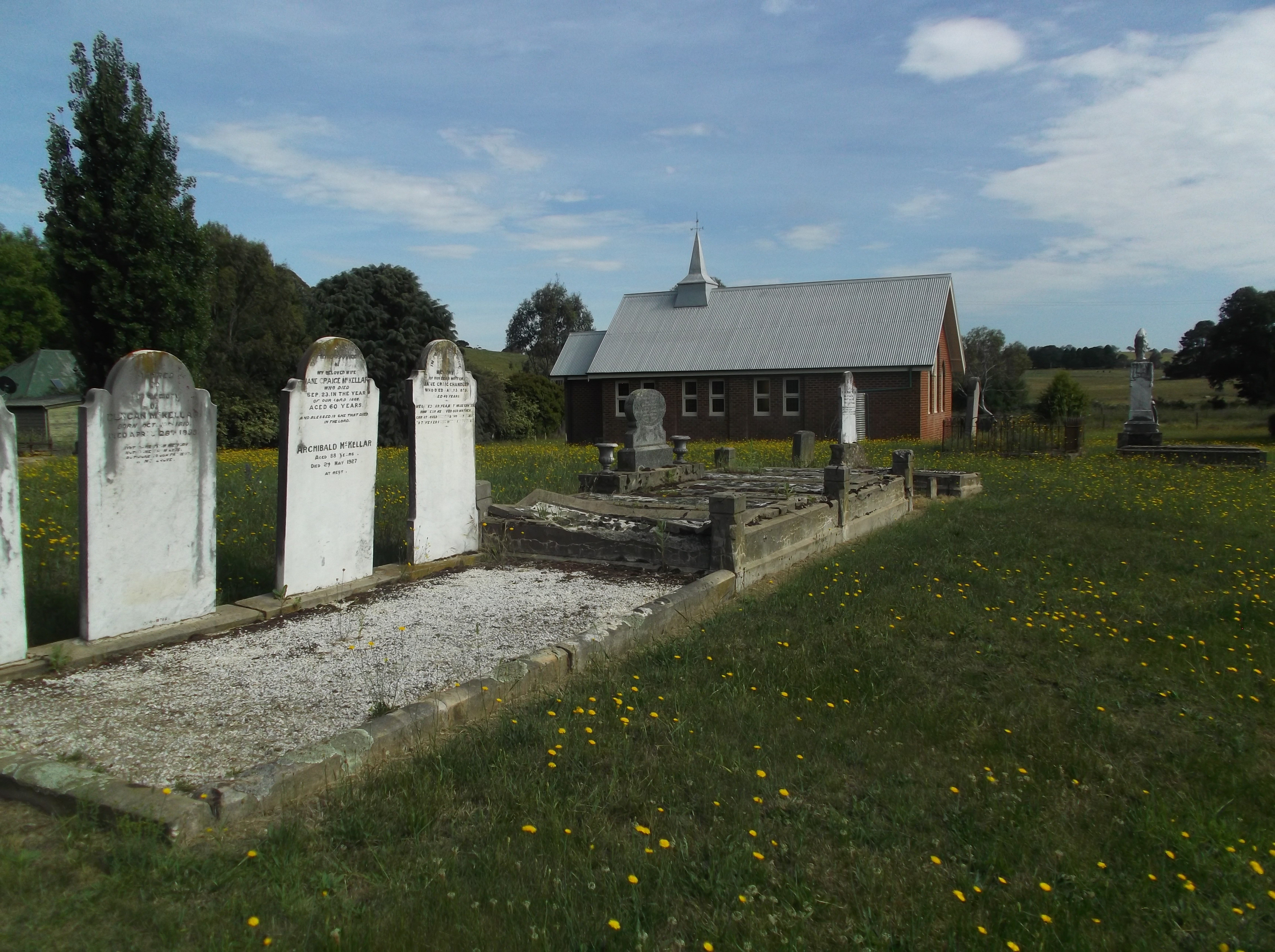
St Peters Uniting Church and graveyard in summer 2017, from the South

The village contains two locally heritage listed buildings:

- 9 Church Lane, St Peters Uniting Church (formerly Presbyterian) and its cemetery.
- 11 Church Lane, the 1881 school (now a private residence) and its garden.

On 23 September 2016, an arsonist set fire to furniture piled up around the St Peter's Uniting Church's communion table which burned the table, Baptismal font, Elder's chairs and the floor, with damage estimated at $100,000. The church has since reopened and regular monthly services have resumed.

The church cemetery is no longer open for new burials, but contains many graves of interest to historians. A new cemetery has been opened in Cemetery Lane, about two kilometres along Three Brothers Road towards Newbridge.

== Coombing Creek ==
Hobbys Yards is on Coombing Creek, less than 3 km from its source. The creek then flows through Barry and Lake Rowlands (a major dam which provides the Blayney town water supply) to join the Belubula River just below Blayney.
