= Carcoar School of Arts =

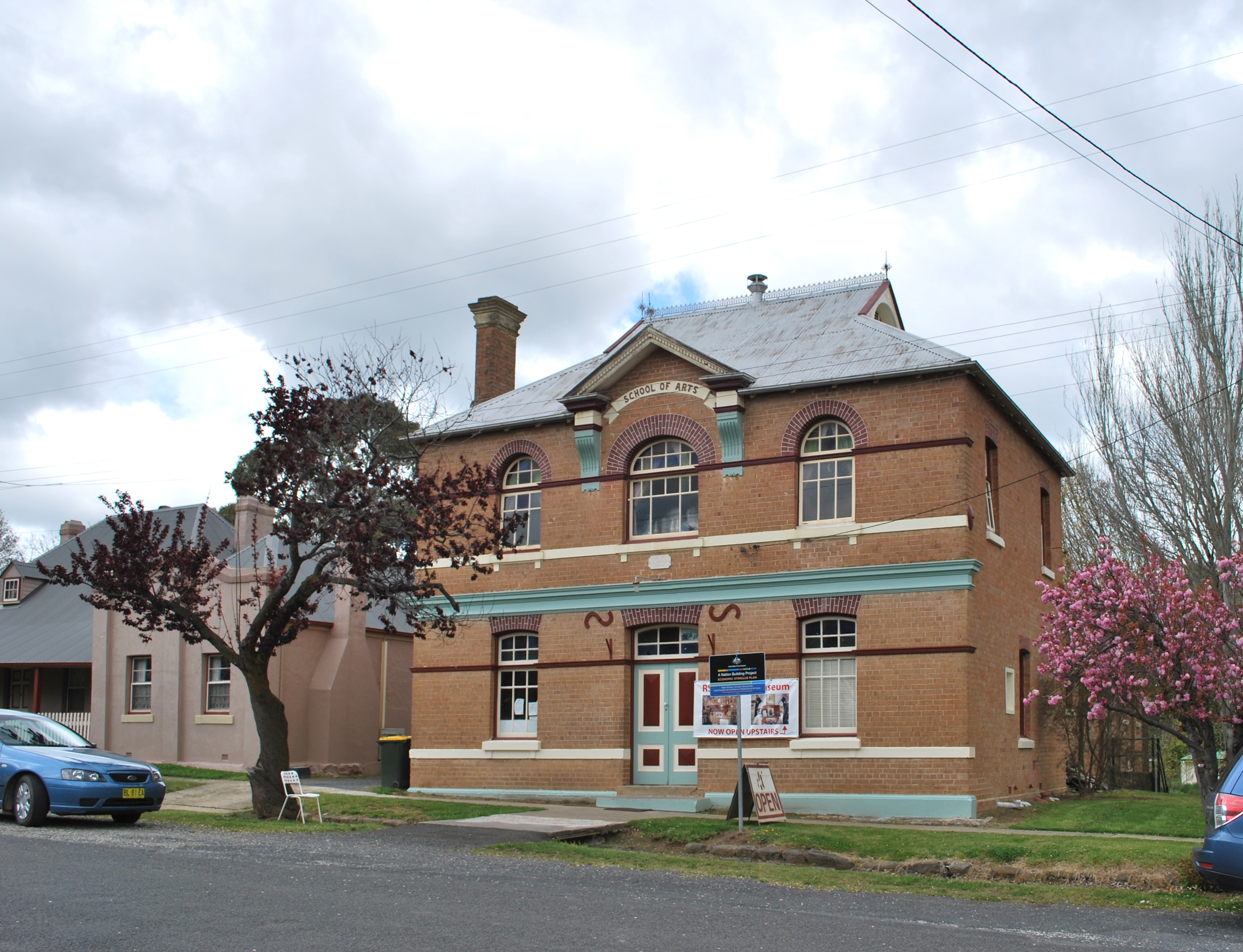

- Location within New South Wales Location within Australia
- 33.6118°S 149.1406°E
- Location: Icely Street, Carcoar, Blayney Shire, New South Wales, Australia

Site notes
- Owner: School of Arts Trustees

New South Wales Heritage Register
- Official name: Carcoar School of Arts; Municipal Council Chambers
- Type: state heritage (built)
- Designated: 2 April 1999
- Reference no.: 266
- Type: School of Arts
- Category: Community Facilities

Carcoar School of Arts is a heritage-listed former municipal chambers and library and now community centre and museum at Icely Street, Carcoar, in the Central West region of New South Wales, Australia. It is also known as the Municipal Council Chambers. The property is owned by the School of Arts Community Hall Carcoar Inc. It was added to the New South Wales State Heritage Register on 2 April 1999.

== History ==
The School of Arts is the most recent of the public buildings built in Carcoar which reflect its former status as the second most populous town west of the Blue Mountains. In the past the building was used as the Municipal Council Chambers before being used as a community centre for functions and meetings.

The School of Arts building opened in July 1901. It was designed by a Bathurst architect, Mr. Copeman, and built by local builders Messrs. Watson and Darrington at a cost of £1011. The building was designed in the Victorian classical style with a Federation period influence.

In 1983, the building underwent a works program consisting of external wall sealing, provision of damp coursing, plaster work to damaged walls, external drainage extension and painting.

In December 2017, the building's new trustees announced that they were seeking funding for urgent repairs.

In addition to serving as a community centre, the building also houses the Carmenhurst Military Museum on the second floor.

== Description ==
The Carcoar School of Arts is part of an Urban Conservation Area classified by the National Trust of Australia . It is a T-shaped building constructed from locally made muddy-grey bricks. It is in the Victorian Classical style of earlier buildings in Carcoar - the courthouse, railway station, hospital and C.B.C. Bank - but also displays a strong Federation period influence, particularly in its roof construction and use of multi-coloured windows. However, the dominant classical style is evidenced by its symmetry, central pediment, banded string courses and plastered bays.

The front two-storey section of the building contains a supper room, kitchen, dressing rooms, toilets and upstairs meeting room. The main body of the building, a single storey hall with stage, reflects the classical style of the exterior in its plastered detailing.

== Heritage listing ==
The larger scale of buildings, common building line and a number of street trees in front of these buildings, create a group of significant importance.

Carcoar School of Arts was listed on the New South Wales State Heritage Register on 2 April 1999 having satisfied the following criteria.

The place is important in demonstrating aesthetic characteristics and/or a high degree of creative or technical achievement in New South Wales.

Whilst the most recent (public) building in Carcoar, the building achieves harmony with other buildings of similar scale through detail and form. it is a significant feature of the historic buildings comprising the focal centre of the village.

The place has strong or special association with a particular community or cultural group in New South Wales for social, cultural or spiritual reasons.

The previous uses of the building as Municipal Chambers and School of Arts endorses its community importance to the residents of Carcoar. This importance continues as it is the main community facility for functions, dances and social events.
