= Old Rectory =

Old Rectory or The Old Rectory may refer to:

== United Kingdom ==
=== England ===
- Old Rectory, Bolton Abbey, North Yorkshire
- Old Rectory, Epworth, Lincolnshire
- Old Rectory, Spofforth, North Yorkshire
- Old Rectory, Stockport, Greater Manchester
- Old Rectory, Stokesley, North Yorkshire
- Old Rectory, Warton, Lancashire
- Old Rectory, Wimbledon, London
- The Old Rectory, Brandsby, North Yorkshire
- The Old Rectory, Chidham, West Sussex
- The Old Rectory, Croscombe, Somerset
- The Old Rectory, Fortuneswell, Dorset
- The Old Rectory, Himley, Staffordshire
- The Old Rectory, St Columb Major, Cornwall
- The Old Rectory, Stanwick, Northamptonshire
- The Old Rectory, Tanner Row, in York, North Yorkshire
- The Old Rectory, Yatton, Somerset
- 56 Old Church Street, also known as The Old Rectory, Chelsea, London
- Ellys Manor House, also known as The Old Rectory, Great Ponton, Lincolnshire
- Gawsworth Old Rectory, Cheshire
- Redmarshall Old Rectory, County Durham

=== Wales ===
- St Fagans Old Rectory, Cardiff
- The Old Rectory, Llanbedr, Denbighshire
- The Old Rectory, St Andrews Major, Vale of Glamorgan

=== Isle of Man ===
- The Old Rectory, Andreas Village, one of Isle of Man's Registered Buildings

== Other ==
- Old Rectory, Carcoar, New South Wales, Australia
- Old Rectory (Perrowville, Virginia), Bedford County, Virginia, United States

== See also ==
- Rectory
