= Carcoar Dam =

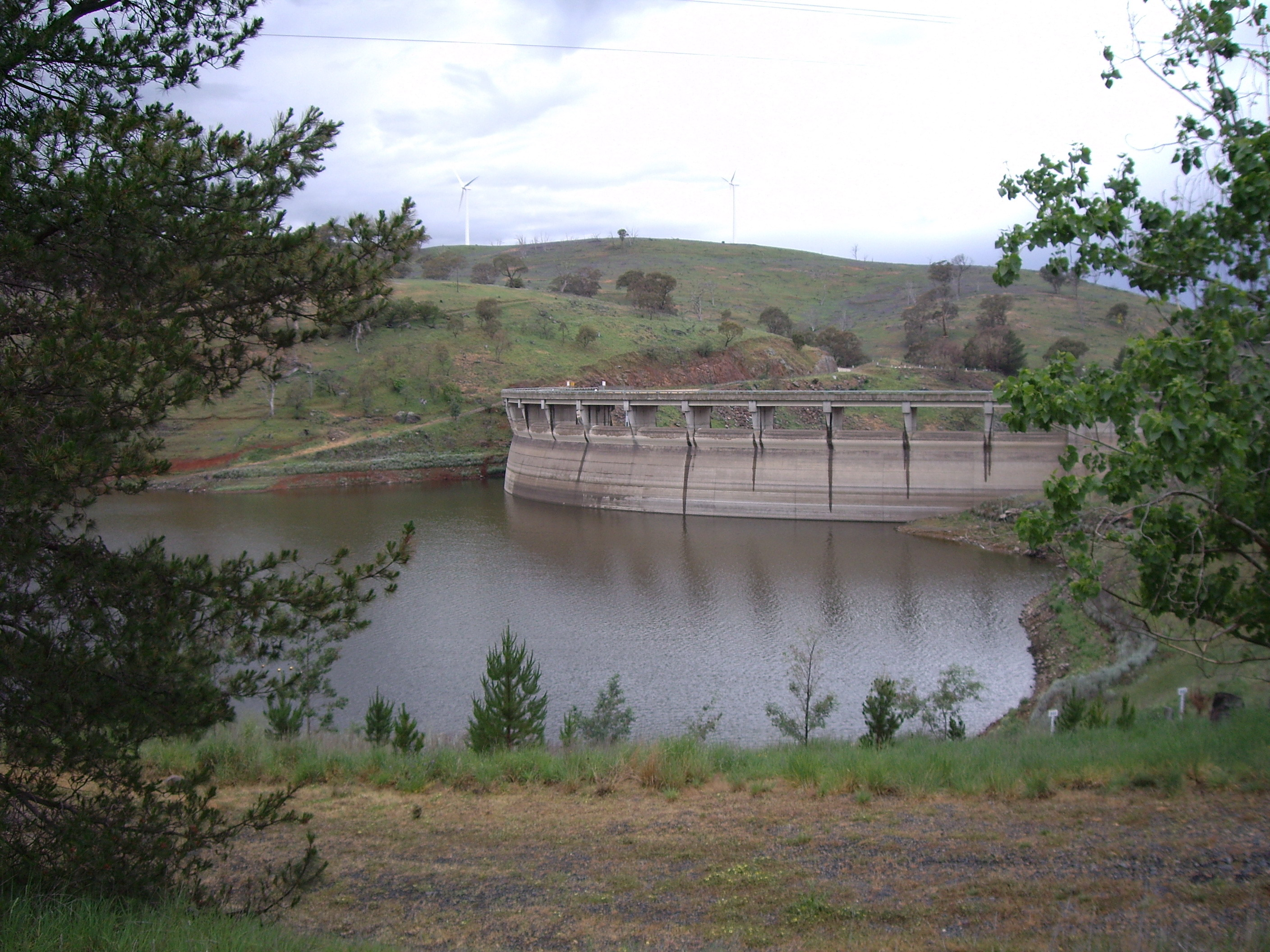
- Carcoar Dam, 2007

- The location of the Carcoar Dam in New South Wales
- Location: Carcoar, New South Wales, Australia
- Coordinates: 33°37′00″S 149°10′45″E
- Purpose: Irrigation, water supply, and water conservation
- Status: Operational
- Construction began: 1969
- Opening date: 1970
- Owner: State Water Corporation

Dam and spillways
- Type of dam: Arch dam
- Impounds: Belubula River
- Height: 52 metres (171 ft)
- Length: 187 metres (614 ft)
- Dam volume: 61 cubic metres (2,200 cu ft)
- Spillways: 1
- Spillway type: Uncontrolled overflow spillway
- Spillway capacity: 1,218 cubic metres per second (43,000 cu ft/s)

Reservoir
- Total capacity: 36,400 megalitres (1,290×10^{6} cu ft)
- Catchment area: 230 square kilometres (89 sq mi)
- Surface area: 385 hectares (950 acres)
- Maximum water depth: 41 metres (135 ft)
- Normal elevation: 720 metres (2,360 ft) AHD
- Website; Carcoar Dam at www.statewater.com.au

Carcoar Dam is a minor ungated concrete double parabolic arch dam with an uncontrolled overflow spillway across the Belubula River upstream of Carcoar in the central west region of New South Wales, Australia. The dam's purpose includes irrigation, water supply, and water conservation.

== Location and features ==
Commenced in 1969 and completed in 1970, Carcoar Dam is a minor dam on the Belubula River, a tributary of the Lachlan River, within the Lachlan Valley, approximately 6 kilometres (3.7 mi) north of the village of Carcoar and south of the town of Blayney. Water from the dam is released directly into the Belubula River which is used by irrigators downstream of the dam, and for stock and domestic requirements along the Belubula River.

The dam wall height is 57 metres (187 ft) and is 187 metres (614 ft) long. The maximum water depth is 41 metres (135 ft) and at 100% capacity the dam wall holds back 36,400 megalitres (1,290×10^{6} cu ft) of water at 720 metres (2,360 ft) AHD. The surface area of the dam is 385 hectares (950 acres) and the catchment area is 230 square kilometres (89 sq mi). The dam uses a free-flowing spillway which is capable of discharging 1,218 cubic metres per second (43,000 cu ft/s).

The dam is unusual in that its wall is not only curved from side-to-side but also from top to bottom.

The dam is popular for water skiing, swimming, fishing, windsurfing and sailing. Camping, picnic and barbecue facilities are available. Murray Cod, Golden Perch, Silver Perch and Rainbow Trout are all stocked fish in Carcoar Dam with Redfin present.

=== Carcoar wetland ===
In the early 1990s, the NSW Government assisted to establish wetlands at Carcoar Dam in an effort to control blue-green algae which had made the dam unusable for recreation and made the water discharged from the dam unusable, even for domestic animals. The purpose of the wetland was to act as a nutrient sink which could capture nutrients prior to them entering the reservoir.

== Gallery ==
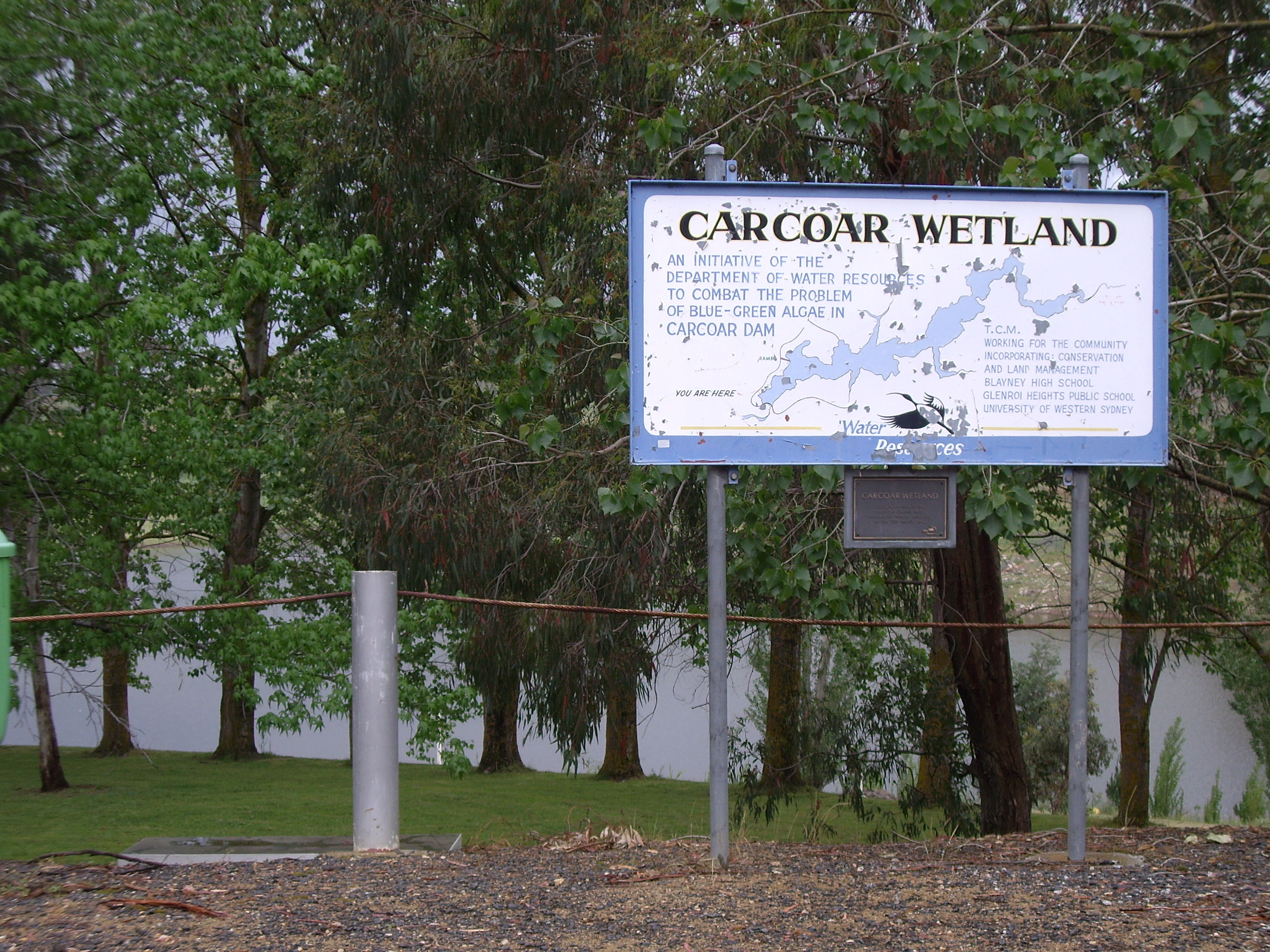
Carcoar wetland, 2007.

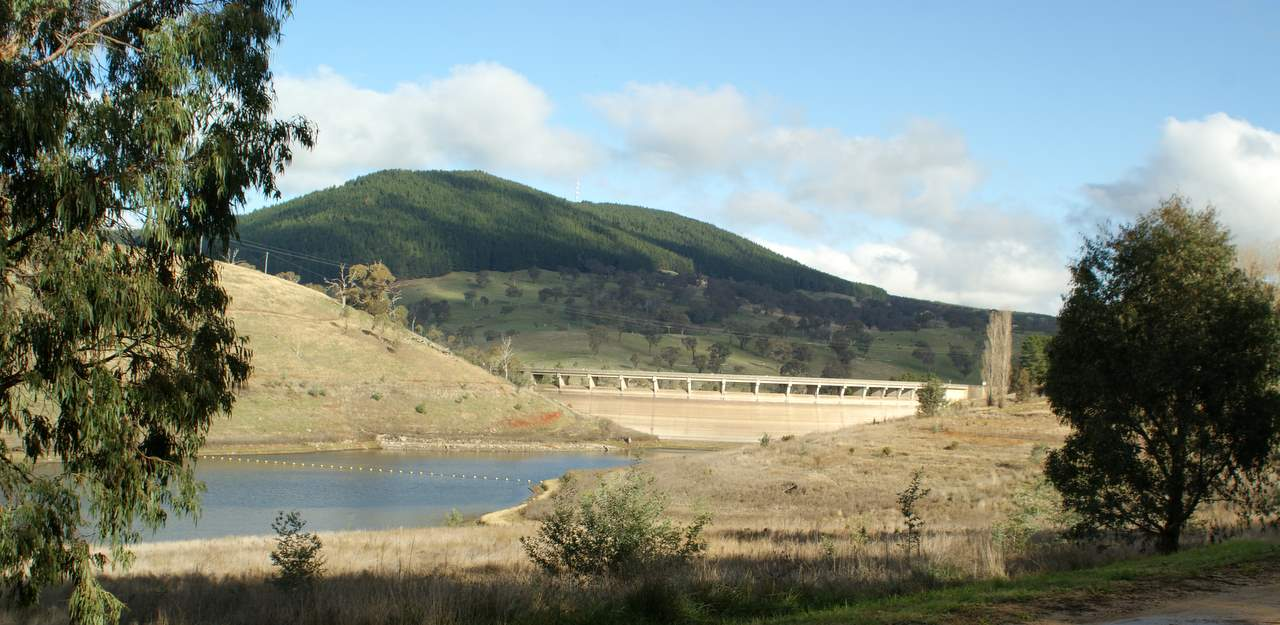
Carcoar Dam, with estimated capacity of 2,000 megalitres (71×10^{6} cu ft), in 2010.

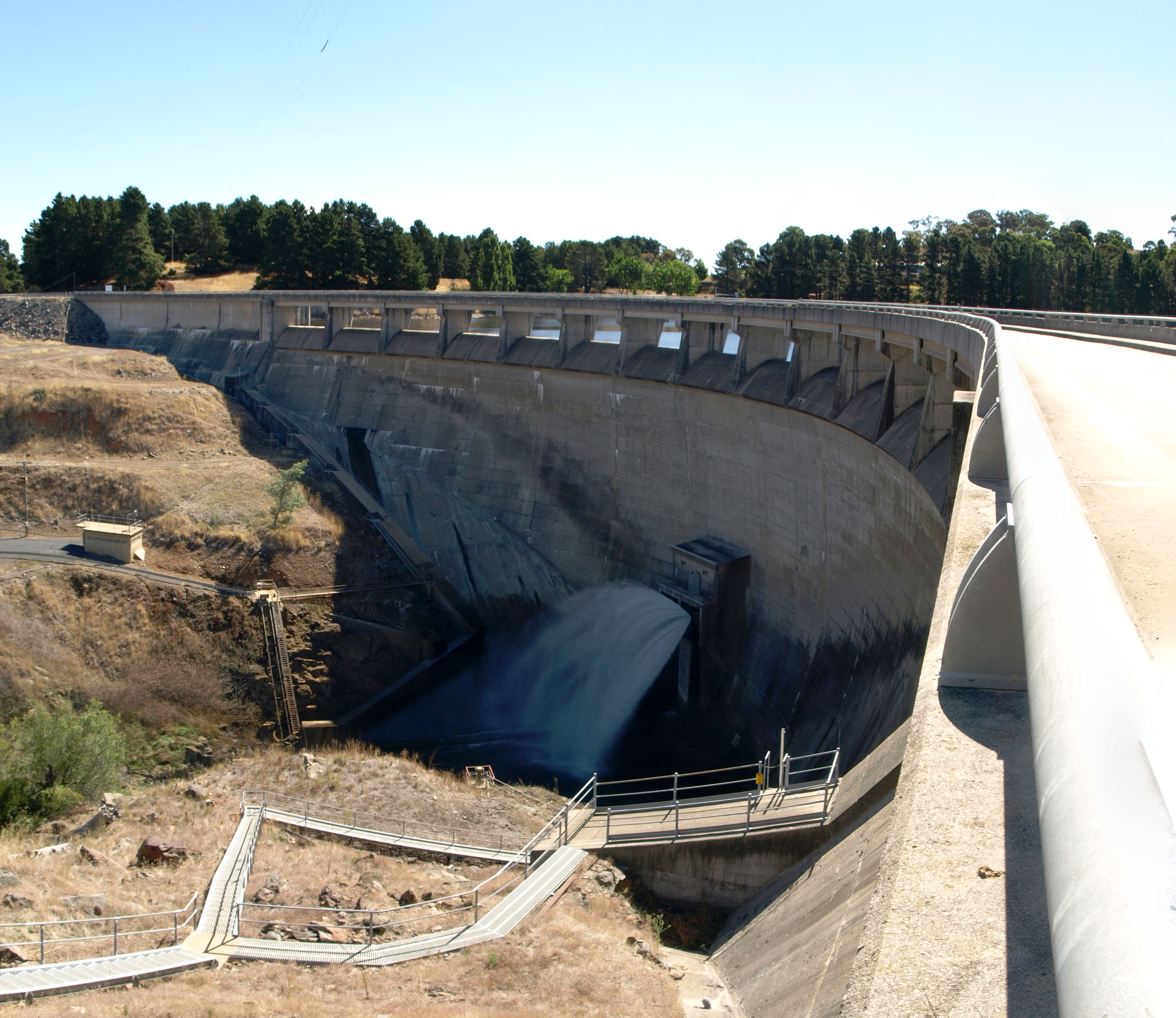
Carcoar Dam.

== See also ==
- List of dams and reservoirs in New South Wales
