= Newbridge railway station =

Newbridge railway station may refer to:

- Newbridge railway station (Ireland)
- Newbridge railway station (Wales)
- Newbridge railway station, New South Wales
