= Belubula River =

River in New South Wales, Australia

Coordinates: 33°33′S 148°28′E

Belubula King Plains Creek, Dungeon Creek
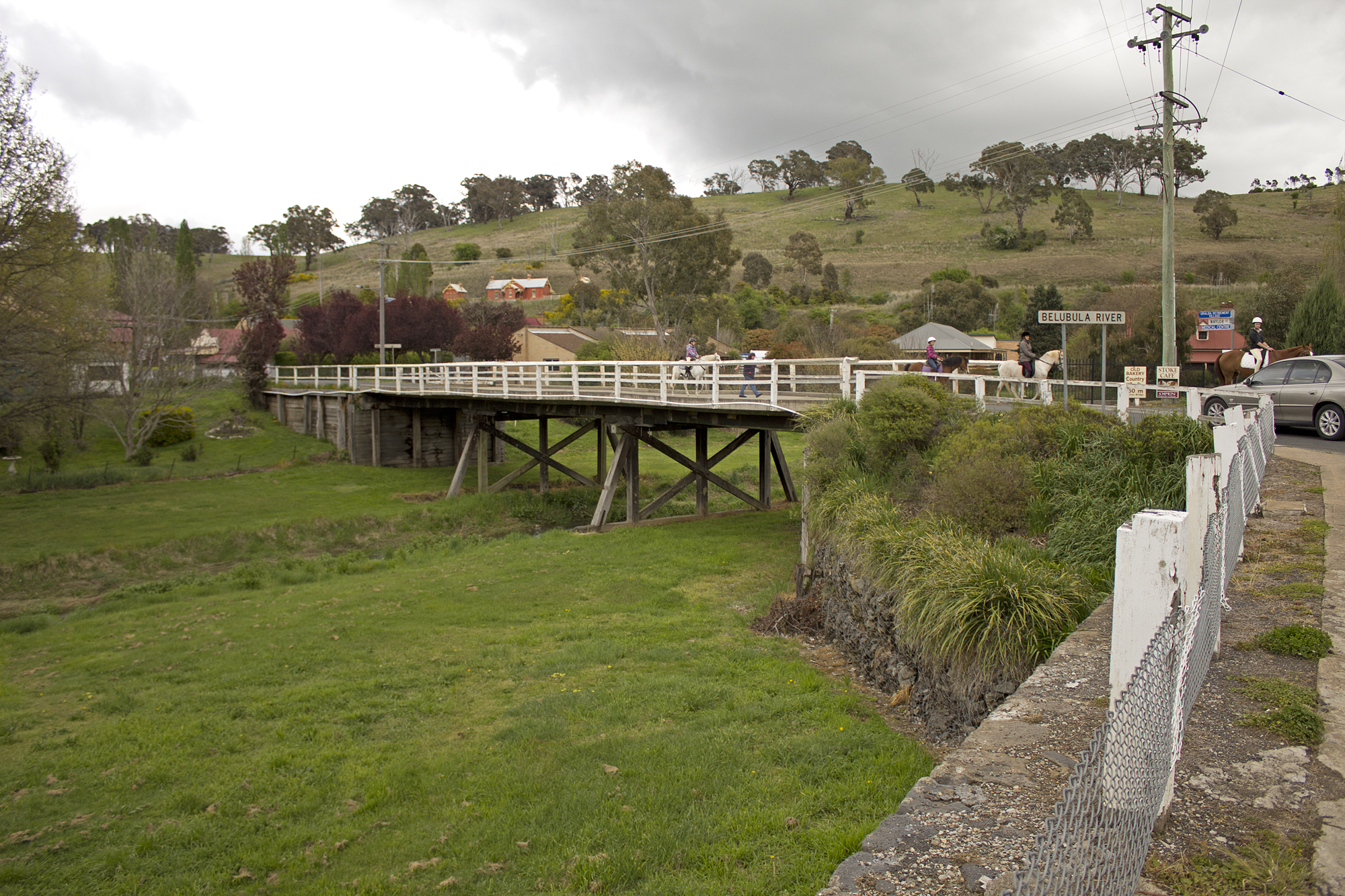
- Concrete bridge over the Belubula River in Carcoar
- Etymology: Aboriginal: stony river; big lagoon

Location
- Country: Australia
- State: New South Wales
- Region: IBRA: South Eastern Highlands
- District: Central West
- Municipalities: Bathurst, Blayney, Cabonne

Physical characteristics
- Source
  - location: south of Vittoria
  - elevation: 936 m (3,071 ft)
- Mouth: Lachlan River
  - location: east of Gooloogong
  - elevation: 262 m (860 ft)
- Length: 165 km (103 mi)

Basin features
- River system: Murray–Darling basin
- Tributaries
  - left: Coombing Creek, Mandurama Ponds, Limestone Creek (New South Wales), Jacks Creek (New South Wales)
  - right: Cadiangullong Creek, Swallow Creek, Panuara Rivulet, Nyrang Creek

Belubula River, a perennial river that is part of the Lachlan catchment within the Murray–Darling basin, is located in the central west region of New South Wales, Australia.

== Location and features ==
The river rises south of Vittoria, midway between Bathurst and Orange and generally flows south and west, joined by eight minor tributaries, flowing through Carcoar Lake where its flow is regulated, before reaching its mouth at the Lachlan River, east of Gooloogong; dropping 674 metres (2,211 ft) over its course of 165 kilometres (103 mi).

The name is derived from the Australian Aboriginal meaning for stony river or big lagoon. The original inhabitants of the land alongside the Belubula River are the Indigenous Australians of the Wiradjuri clan.

Towns on the Belubula River, from its source towards its mouth, include Blayney, Carcoar, and Canowindra.

In the early 21st century, the New South Wales government assessed the potential for a new dam of up to 700 gigalitres at Cranky Rock on the Belubula River. However, in 2018 the proposal was shelved due to environmental concerns.

== Gallery ==
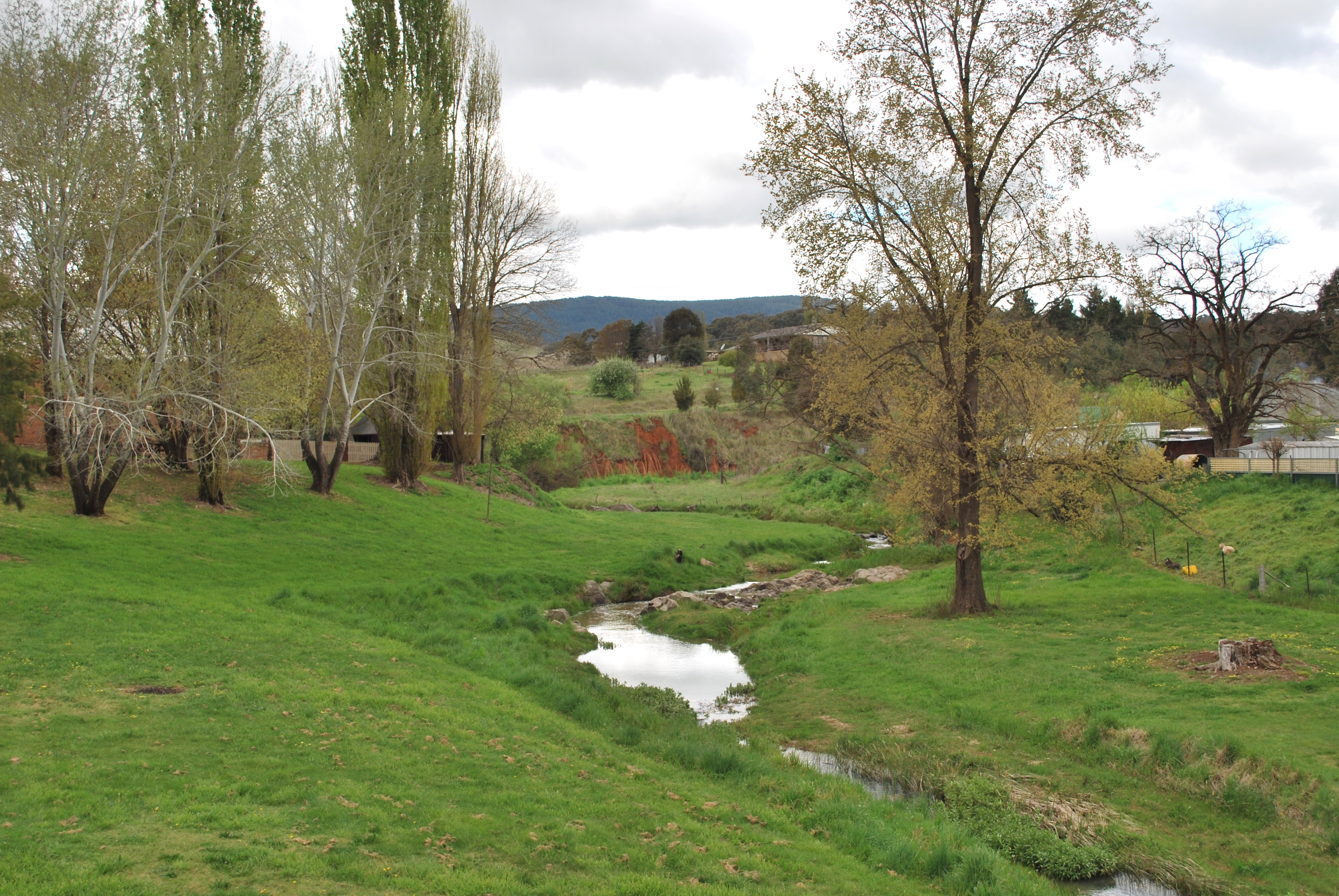
Belubula River, in Carcoar

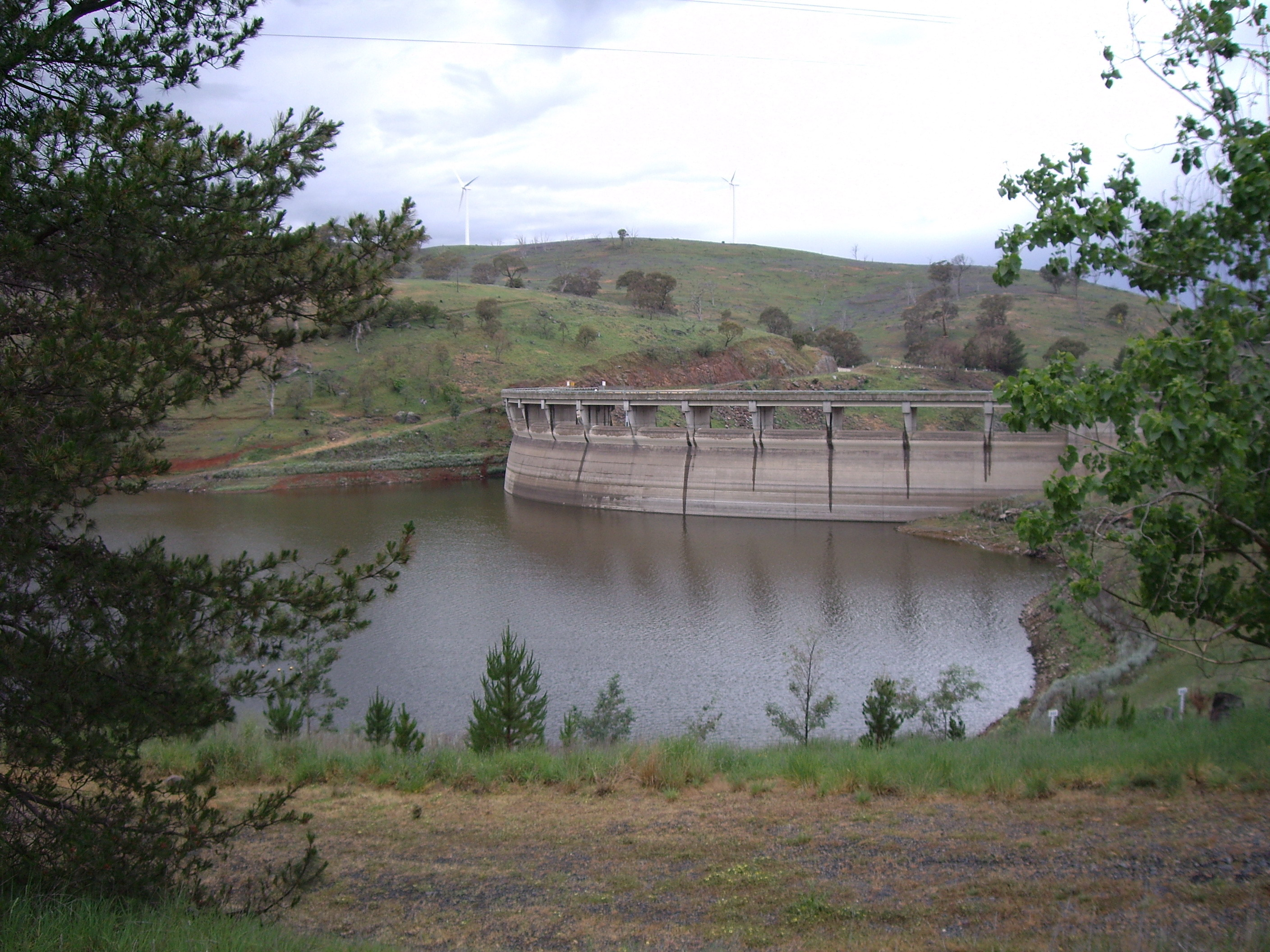
Carcoar Dam, on the Belubula River

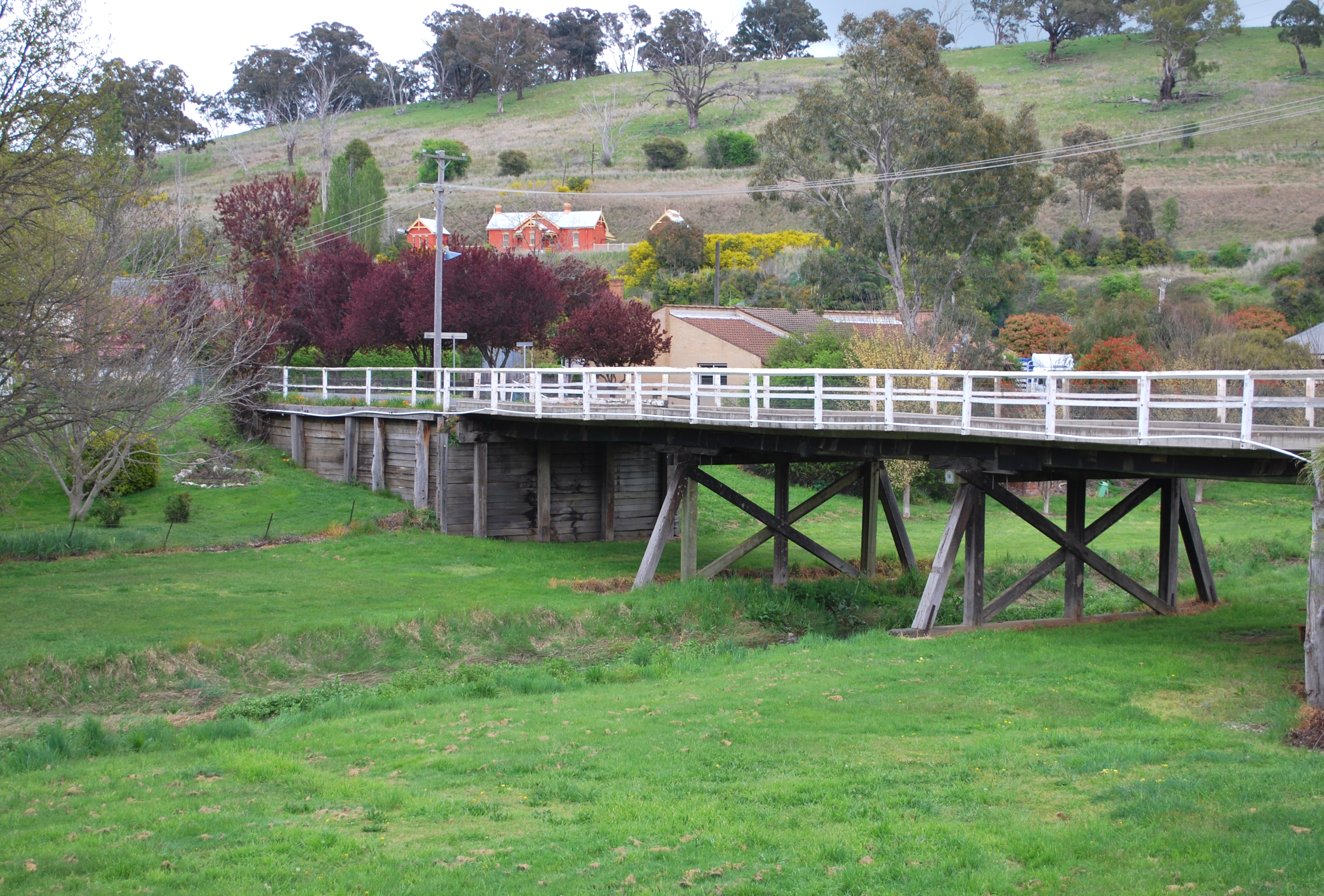
Wooden bridge over the Belubula River, in Carcoar

== See also ==
- List of rivers of Australia § New South Wales
- Junction Reefs Dam
