= The Saddlery =

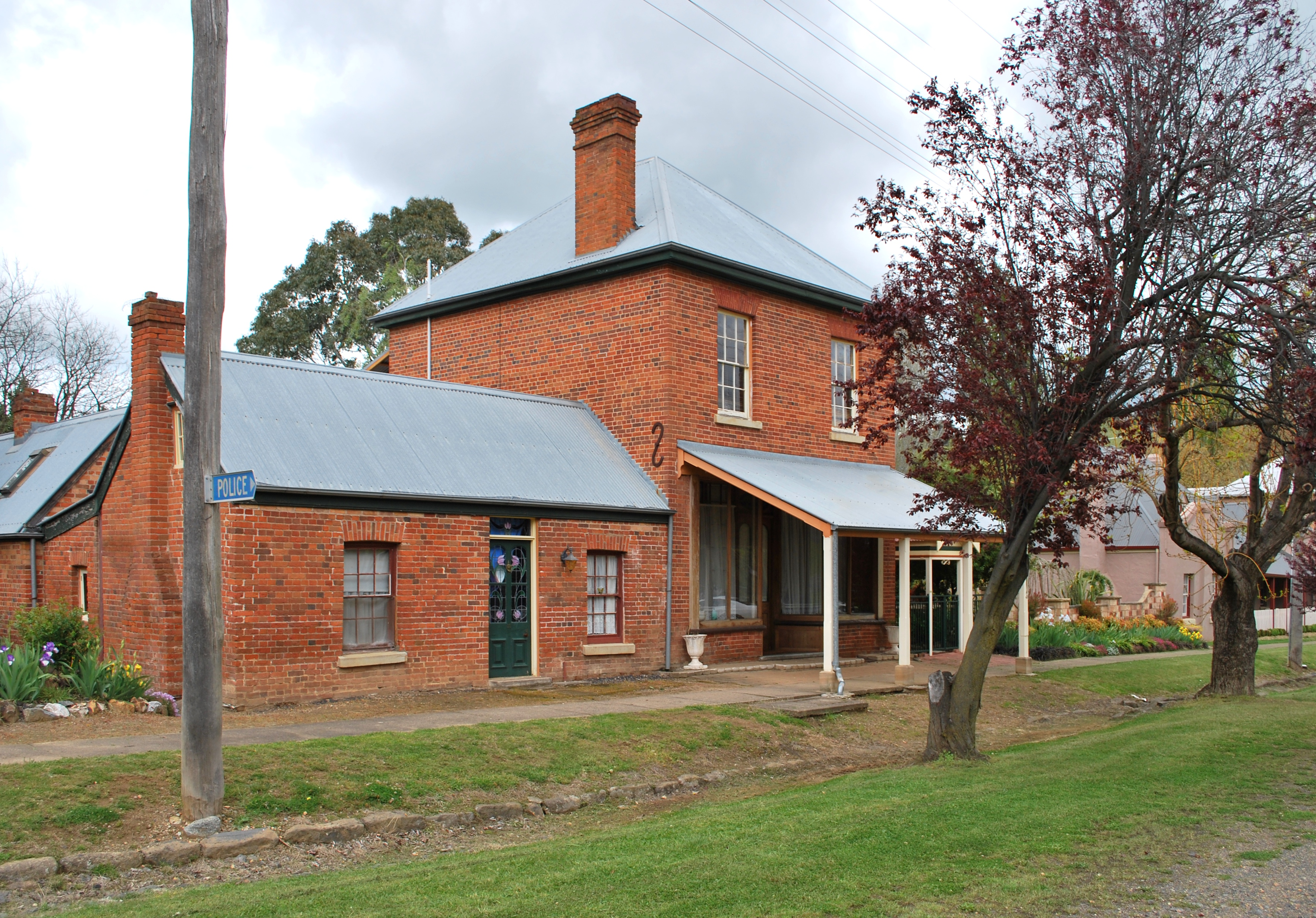

- Location within New South Wales Location within Australia
- 33.6120°S 149.1411°E
- Location: Icely Street, Carcoar, Blayney Shire, New South Wales, Australia

History
- Built: 1840–1860

New South Wales Heritage Register
- Official name: Saddlery, The; Butchers Shop; The Saddlery
- Type: state heritage (built)
- Designated: 2 April 1999
- Reference no.: 328
- Type: Shop
- Category: Retail and Wholesale
- Builders: William Doyle, Alexander Clarke

The Saddlery is a heritage-listed former shop and now residence at Icely Street, Carcoar, Blayney Shire, New South Wales, Australia. It was built from 1840 to 1860 by William Doyle and Alexander Clarke. It was added to the New South Wales State Heritage Register on 2 April 1999.

== History ==
In 1844, William Doyle received a Crown Land Grant on which he constructed a small building, which he ran from 1844 to 1850 as a licensed inn. The core of Doyle's building appears to be within the single storied sections surviving today.

In 1850, Doyle sold the site and buildings for the sum of 52 pounds to Mr John Neville, labourer, who in turn, in 1852 sold to Alexander Clarke.

Clarke was a saddler by trade, however he appears to have used the single storey buildings as a local butcher shop in the 1850s and 1860s. The bushranger Frank Gardiner, on his ticket of leave from Cockatoo Island, is known to have worked for Clarke for a period of three months in the early 1860s.

The two storied building, presently referred to as The Saddlery, was probably constructed by Clarke in the 1860s and used by him as a saddlery up until his death in 1905. Clarke's family was well respected in the area. His brother, W. T. Clarke, owned a large store on the main street of Carcoar, and Alexander himself became a Councillor on the Carcoar Town Council. He is buried in the Carcoar cemetery and a substantial headstone marks his grave.

The property was held by the family until 1915 and since that time has been used as a private residence.

In 1979, the then owner of The Saddlery, Mr Ron Murray applied for financial assistance to restore The Saddlery.

In 1981, through the Heritage Conservation Fund, the Saddlery was restored with the aid of a $40,000 grant and a $35,000 loan.

As part of the conditions of the financial assistance and to ensure the long term preservation of The Saddlery the Heritage Council recommended to the Minister that a Permanent Conservation Order be placed over the building. It was gazetted on 26 October 1984 and transferred to the State Heritage Register on 2 April 1999.

== Description ==
The buildings consist of a fine Georgian two storied brick shop built in the 1860s and a single storey wing dating from the 1840s. The building contains fine Georgian fire surrounds, built-in cedar cupboards and an internal cedar staircase. Unusual side-pivoted sash windows also survive. The complex displays a wealth of early Georgian details. The shop-front in particular is a rare survival of a "shuttered" display front.

It was reported to be in good physical condition as at 22 May 2001.

== Heritage listing ==
The Saddlery makes an important contribution to the character of Carcoar. The shop front in particular is a rare survivor of a "shuttered" shop font. The Saddlery displays many fine Georgian architectural features. The Saddlery is associated with the Clarke family, a well respected and active family in the Carcoar area.

The Saddlery was listed on the New South Wales State Heritage Register on 2 April 1999.
