= Forest Reefs =

Forest Reefs New South Wales
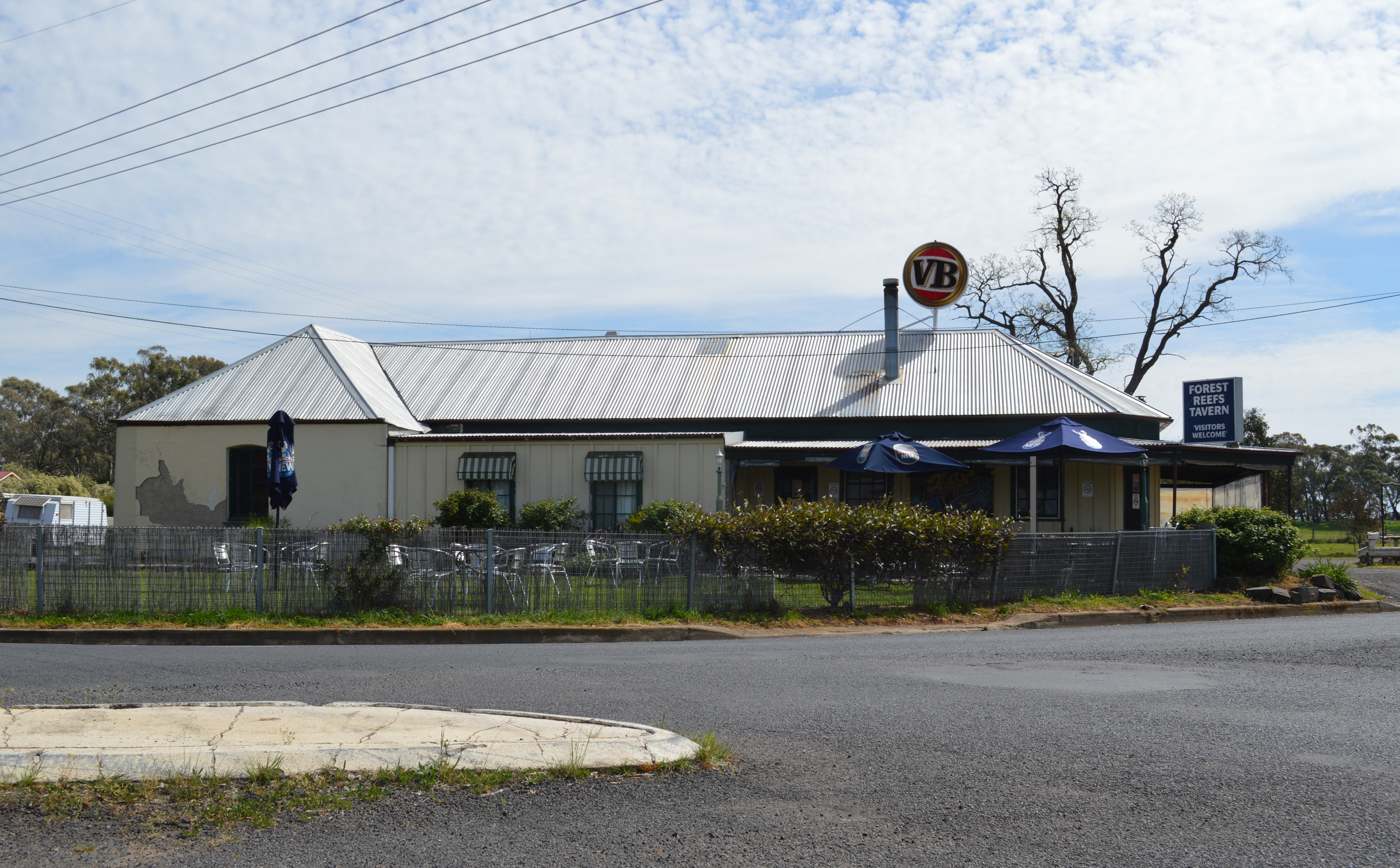
- Forest Reefs Tavern

- Coordinates: 33°27′17.2″S 149°05′10.5″E
- Population: 537 (2021 census)
- Postcode(s): 2798
- Location: 254 km (158 mi) WNW of Sydney; 18 km (11 mi) S of Orange; 22 km (14 mi) NW of Blayney
- LGA(s): Blayney Shire
- County: Bathurst County
- State electorate(s): Bathurst
- Federal division(s): Calare

Forest Reefs is a rural locality in Blayney Shire, within the Central West region of New South Wales, Australia. It is approximately 18 km from Orange. In 2021, the locality had a population of 537.

== History ==
The area now known as Forest Reefs was established by early convict settlers and lies within the traditional lands of Wiradjuri people.

The area was known as The Forest or Beneree, at the time of the Robertson Land Act, in 1860. Forest Reefs was a gold mining area with alluvial gold being found in the 1860s and 1870s. There was also very significant deep lead gold mining in the area, although the material mined from the deep leads needed to be crushed to obtain the gold it contained. Only a few of the reefs in the area were gold-bearing.

A post office was opened in 1870. In 1901, the Post Office Directory showed its population of 500, with a butcher shop, blacksmith shop, baker, school, two hotels and three stores. A school opened in January 1871 but closed in May the same year. Another school opened in February 1882 and closed in December 1990.

An area that was identified as 'Forest Reefs' was one of the sites suggested for the new national capital and capital territory, but that proposed area lay west of Blayney, north of Carcoar; it does not correspond with the locality now called Forest Reefs. This suggests that in those times, 'Forest Reefs' was taken to mean a far wider area than it does now.

By 1974, the Post Office had closed. One of the hotels, the Forest Reef Tavern, remains open at the village.
