= St Andrews Major =

Village in the Vale of Glamorgan, Wales

Coordinates: 51.4356°N 3.2407°W

St Andrews Major: Welsh: Saint Andras
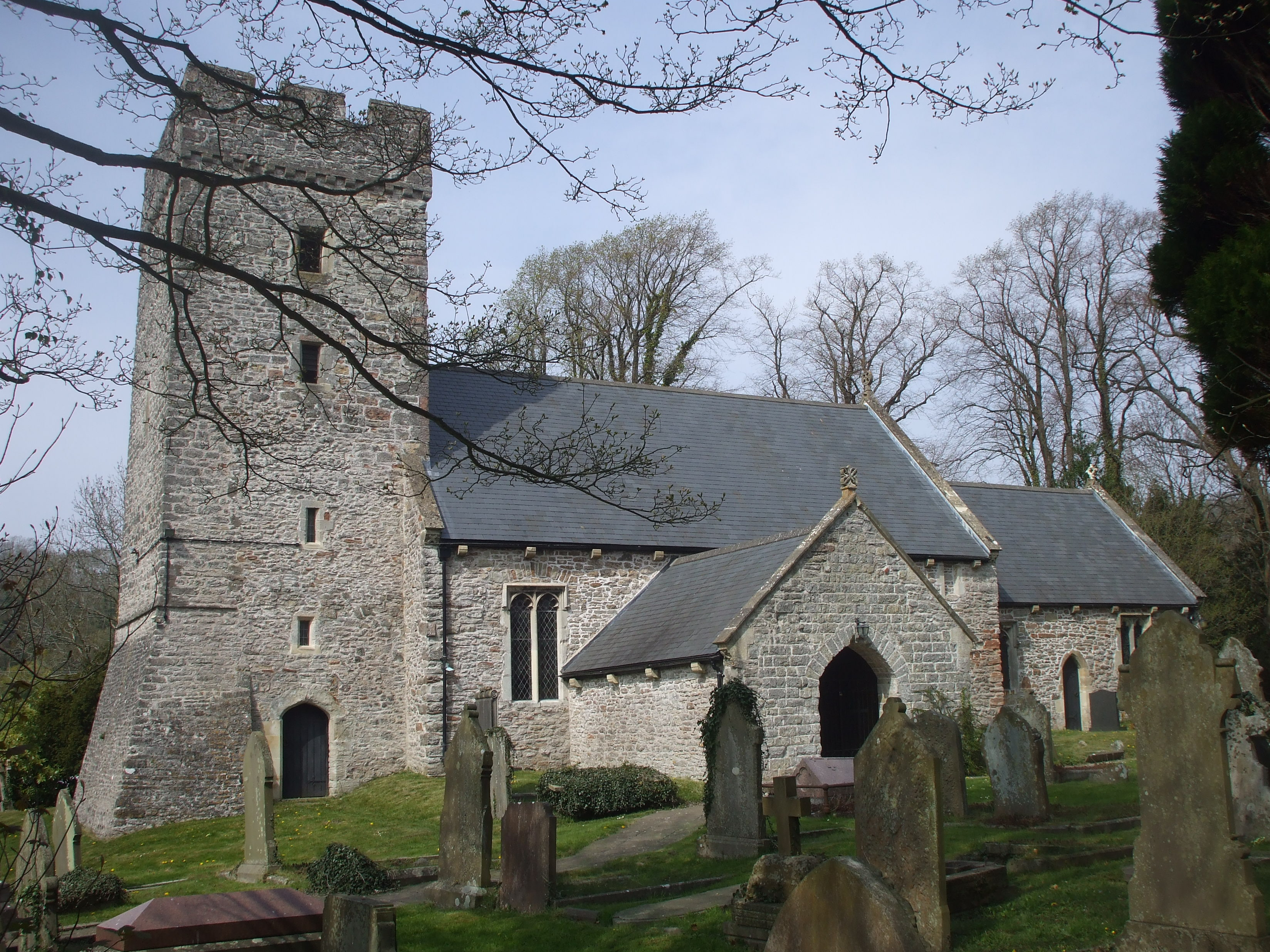
- St Andrews Major church

- Location within the Vale of Glamorgan
- OS grid reference: ST139715
- Principal area: Vale of Glamorgan
- Preserved county: South Glamorgan
- Country: Wales
- Sovereign state: United Kingdom
- Postcode district: CF
- Police: South Wales
- Fire: South Wales
- Ambulance: Welsh
- UK Parliament: Vale of Glamorgan
- Senedd Cymru – Welsh Parliament: Vale of Glamorgan

St Andrews Major (Welsh: Saint Andras) is a village and parish in the community of Dinas Powys in the Vale of Glamorgan, between Barry and Cardiff in south-eastern Wales.

== Description ==
The village has a church which is over 600 years old and a primary school. Back in the early 19th century the house just past the church used to be a coaching inn, but the local Lord of the Manor had it closed down as all his farm labourers were spending their wages in there and not getting any work done (according to local history). The property is now a private residence and the village no longer has a pub.

Garnhill House (and Estate), occupying the north of the hamlet, is a Grade II listed building with terraced gardens exhibited at the Royal Academy in 1904, and has been occupied by the Green family for hundreds of years, expanding the Estate piecemeal. Other notable houses include The Rectory and St Andrew's House. In 1801 the village had a population of 420 and 474 in 1833 although now it is simply a small hamlet with fewer than 150 residents.

== Geography ==
The surrounding soil of the parish is a strong, brown, dry earth, well adapted for grain of all kinds. The substratum of the whole is limestone. The ground is rather elevated and hilly towards the northern, side of the parish (Garnhill Estate), and flat and level towards the southern side. It is sometimes subject to partial inundation from the overflowing of a small stream, called Dinas Powis brook, which runs through the south-eastern part of the parish towards the south, and empties itself into the Bristol Channel, between the parishes of Cadoxton and Sully, which lie between St Andrews and the channel.

The nearby St Andrews Quarry has provided limestone for roadbuilding and gravel and also the windows of St Peter's Church at Dinas Powys.

== Church ==
The church is dedicated to Saint Andrew, and is in the Benefice of St Andrews Major and Michaelston-le-Pit. At the east end of the north aisle, parallel with the chancel, is a private chapel, anciently the property and burial-place of a respectable family, named Rowel, long since extinct, and the Bouville family who were owners of a great part of the parish. In the floor of this chapel there is a stone bearing an inscription of the tombs of a couple who had both lived extremely long lives:

Here lyeth the body of John Gibbon James, buried the 14 of August, 1601. And Margaret Mathew, his wife, buried the 8 of January, 1631. He aged ninety-nine, she aged one hundred and twenty-four.

John Wesley is reputed to have preached from the pulpit.

The Rectory, behind the church, was built in 1830 and its gardens used for village celebrations and events. It was built to replace The Old Rectory, (or Old Parsonage) which dates from the 15th century and still exists behind the later building.
