= Old Rectory, Carcoar =

Old Rectory
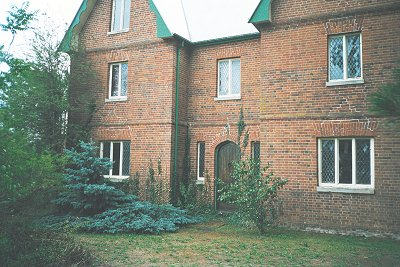

- Location within New South Wales Location within Australia
- 33.6097°S 149.1397°E
- Location: Belubula Street, Carcoar, Blayney Shire, New South Wales, Australia

History
- Built: 1849–1849

Site notes
- Architect: Edmund Blacket

New South Wales Heritage Register
- Official name: Old Rectory
- Type: state heritage (built)
- Designated: 2 April 1999
- Reference no.: 323
- Type: Presbytery/Rectory/ Vicarage/Manse
- Category: Religion

Old Rectory is a heritage-listed former rectory and now residence at Belubula Street, Carcoar, Blayney Shire, New South Wales, Australia. It was designed by Edmund Blacket and built in 1849. It was added to the New South Wales State Heritage Register on 2 April 1999.

== History ==
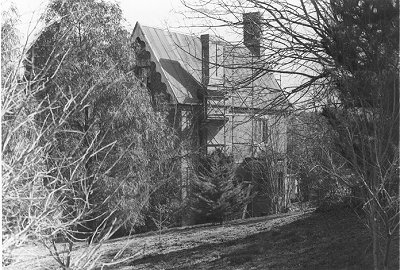
Historic photo

The Old Rectory was designed by Edmund Blacket in 1849 as a rectory for St. Paul's Anglican Church (1848), also a Blacket building. The Old Rectory was also partly used as a school to supplement the rector's income.

New owners in the 1970s renovated the property and began restoring the grounds, which had become a "wilderness" overgrown with blackberries.

In 1982 the owners of the Old Rectory were granted $25,000 from the Heritage Conservation fund. The grant was used to assist in the restoration of the building. As one of the conditions attached to the assistance the owners applied to the Minister for the making of a Permanent Conservation Order over the item. To ensure the long term protection of the building the Heritage Council recommended to the Minister that a Permanent Conservation Order be placed over the building.

The Permanent Conservation Order was gazetted on 26 October 1984. It was transferred to the State Heritage Register on 2 April 1999.

== Description ==
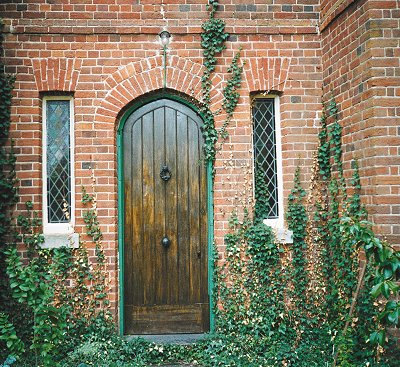
Doorway detail

The Old Rectory is a large 17 room brick building. It has a basement, two floors and an attic. The building is Gothic in style and has a number of leadlight windows. It has stone foundations.

== Heritage listing ==
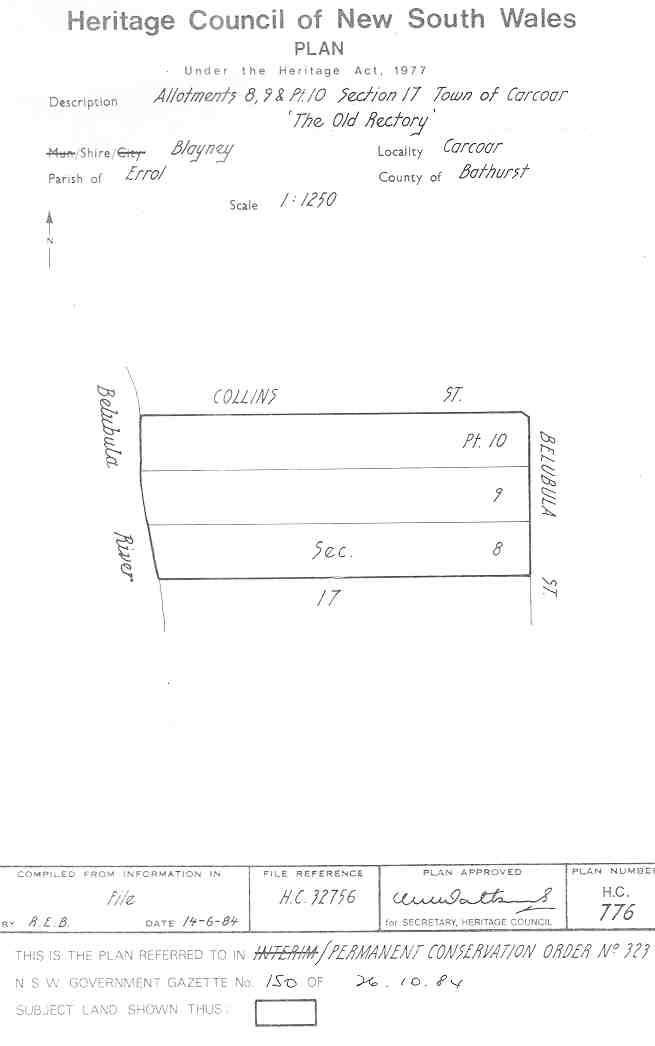
Heritage boundaries

The Old Rectory was designed by Edmund Blacket in 1849 as a rectory for St. Paul's Anglican Church (1848), also designed by Blacket. The Old Rectory is an important component of the historic village of Carcoar.

The Old Rectory was listed on the New South Wales State Heritage Register on 2 April 1999.
