= Newbridge railway station, New South Wales =

Newbridge railway station
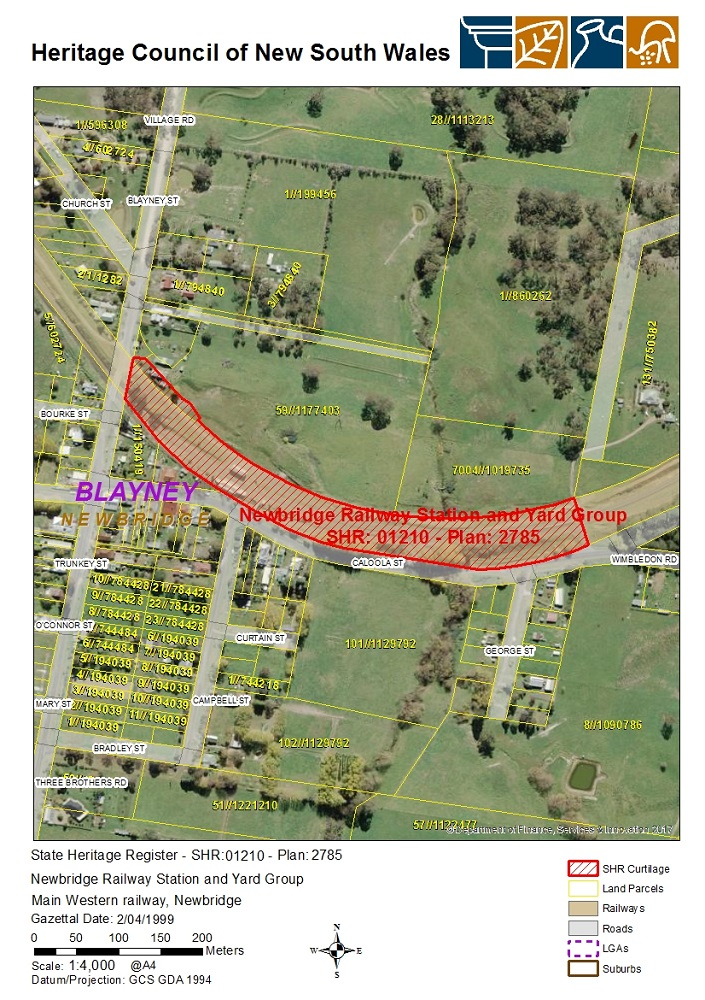
- Heritage boundaries

- Location within New South Wales Location within Australia
- 33.5836°S 149.3698°E
- Location: Main Western railway, Newbridge, Blayney Shire, New South Wales, Australia

Site notes
- Owner: Transport Asset Holding Entity

New South Wales Heritage Register
- Official name: Newbridge Railway Station and yard group
- Type: state heritage (complex / group)
- Designated: 2 April 1999
- Reference no.: 1210
- Type: Railway Platform/ Station
- Category: Transport - Rail

Newbridge railway station is a heritage-listed disused railway station on the Main Western railway line, Newbridge, Blayney Shire, New South Wales, Australia. The property was added to the New South Wales State Heritage Register on 2 April 1999.

== Description ==
The heritage-listed complex includes a type 3 station building, built in the second class sub-type 1 design in 1882. The platform faces date from 1882 and 1914 respectively. The station also contains a timber footbridge dating from 1914 and a timber, skillion roofed signal box dating from 1915. The station lamp room and a Gregory 5 ton jib crane are also included in the heritage listing.

== Heritage listing ==
The group is significant as it forms an intact small mainline station complex in good condition with an unusual adaptation of the building and platform to achieve duplication. It represents in unaltered form a station complex c. 1914 with track and yard arrangements still in position. The buildings and site form an integral part of the town of Newbridge, without which the town would not have survived.

The station building is a very fine early railway structure located within an intact setting. The other structures add to the completeness of the site and are good representative examples of their types when built.

Newbridge railway station was listed on the New South Wales State Heritage Register on 2 April 1999 having satisfied the following criteria.

The place possesses uncommon, rare or endangered aspects of the cultural or natural history of New South Wales.

This item is assessed as historically rare. This item is assessed as scientifically rare. This item is assessed as arch. rare. This item is assessed as socially rare.
