= Barry, New South Wales =

Village in Blayney Shire, New South Wales

Coordinates: 33°39′S 149°16′E

Barry is a small village in the Central West region of New South Wales, Australia, in Blayney Shire. It is situated within an hour's driving time of the townships and villages of Blayney, Millthorpe, Mandurama, Neville, Lyndhurst and Carcoar. In the 2021 census, a population of 153 people was recorded.

== History ==
One of the original occupants was prospector Edward Hargraves, who originally named the village Five Islands. He probably chose this name from a parcel of about 100 acres (0.40 km^{2}) of land that he previously owned in the Five Islands area of Wollongong, New South Wales.

The village developed during the second half of the 19th century with the building of a school in 1862, stores, a church, a blacksmith's establishment and town hall, the establishment of a general goods carrier and the influx of agricultural workers.

In 1890 the village changed its name to Barry – probably in honour of a Caleb Barry, who was the former bank manager of nearby Blayney and a vigorous member of the Church of England in that town. Indeed, the streets of Barry are named after clergy (including bishops) of the time, such as Barber, Moorhouse, Hale, Marsden, Pearson, Sawyer, Turner, Selwyn and Staunton.

== Barry today ==
Today all the public buildings except for St James Anglican Church, the school and the community hall are closed. Other public buildings, such as the Post Office, the stores, the school residence and the former Roman Catholic Church of St Therese, are private residences.

Barry's streets, other than the intersection of Selwyn and Sawyer Streets, remain unsealed. Water resources have, however, improved, with water now flowing from a hilltop tank that is constantly supplied by a bore.
