= Cadiangullong Creek =

River in New South Wales, Australia

Cadiangullong
- Location of the Cadiangullong Creek mouth in New South Wales

Location
- Country: Australia
- State: New South Wales
- Region: South Eastern Highlands (IBRA), Central West
- LGAs: Cabonne, Cowra

Physical characteristics
- Source: Mount Canobolas
  - location: below Watts Pinnacle
  - coordinates: 33°21′56″S 148°58′55″E
  - elevation: 968 m (3,176 ft)
- Mouth: confluence with Belubula River
  - location: north of Millamolong
  - coordinates: 33°33′48″S 148°57′30″E
  - elevation: 450 m (1,480 ft)
- Length: 27 km (17 mi)

Basin features
- River system: Lachlan sub-catchment, Murray–Darling basin

The Cadiangullong Creek, a mostly–perennial river that is part of the Lachlan sub-catchment of the Murrumbidgee catchment within the Murray–Darling basin, is located in the Central West region of New South Wales, Australia.

== Course and features ==
The Cadiangullong Creek (technically a river) rises on the slopes of Mount Canobolas below Watts Pinnacle, and flows generally south by west before reaching its confluence with the Belubula River north of the settlement of Millamong. The creek descends 494 metres (1,621 ft) over its 27-kilometre (17 mi) course.

== See also ==
- List of rivers of New South Wales (A-K)
- Rivers of New South Wales
