= Carcoar railway station =

Disused railway station in New South Wales, Australia

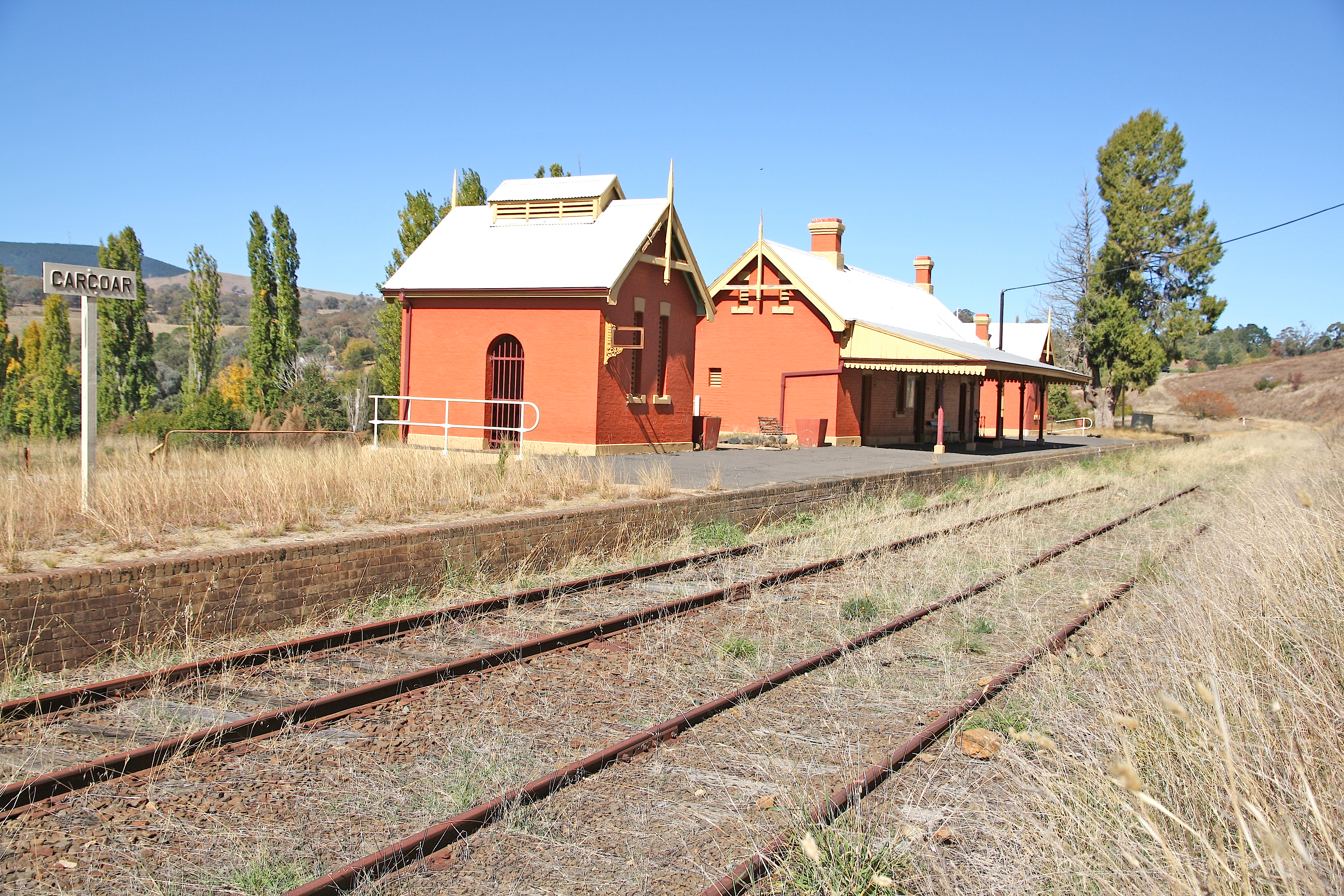

- Location within New South Wales Location within Australia
- 33.6123°S 149.1370°E
- Location: Blayney-Demondrille line, Carcoar, Blayney Shire, New South Wales, Australia

Site notes
- Owner: Transport Asset Manager of New South Wales

New South Wales Heritage Register
- Official name: Carcoar Railway Station group
- Type: state heritage (complex / group)
- Designated: 2 April 1999
- Reference no.: 1110
- Type: Railway
- Category: Transport – Rail

Carcoar railway station is a heritage-listed disused railway station on the Blayney-Demondrille line at Carcoar, in the Central West region of New South Wales, Australia. The property was added to the New South Wales State Heritage Register on 2 April 1999.

== History ==
The line to Carcoar was completed in 1888, when the station building and residence opened.

== Description ==
The heritage complex includes a type 4 station building, built in the standard roadside design, that was built in 1886–87. The brick platform face, the station gates, and the station setting, including the forecourt, cutting, and station planting, are all part of the heritage listing.

== Heritage listing ==
The station building and residence retain their built form with only minor alterations and removal of fabric. The position of the station on the side of the hill overlooking the town gives it a high prominence and visual importance in this historic town and landscape of the area. It also demonstrates the technical achievement of railway construction in difficult locations with the use of cuttings and fill to locate station buildings. It also illustrates how the railway often dominated the landscape into which it was introduced. They form a complete Victorian station complex in excellent condition that enhances the local setting and provides a good example of a roadside station with residence located nearby. The connection with the town is an important part of the group's significance.

Carcoar railway station was listed on the New South Wales State Heritage Register on 2 April 1999, having satisfied the following criteria:

The place possesses uncommon, rare, or endangered aspects of the cultural or natural history of New South Wales.

This item is assessed as historically rare. This item is assessed as scientifically rare. This item is assessed as arch. rare. This item is assessed as socially rare.
