= The Old Rectory, St Andrews Major =

Historic building in Dinas Powys, Vale of Glamorgan, Wales

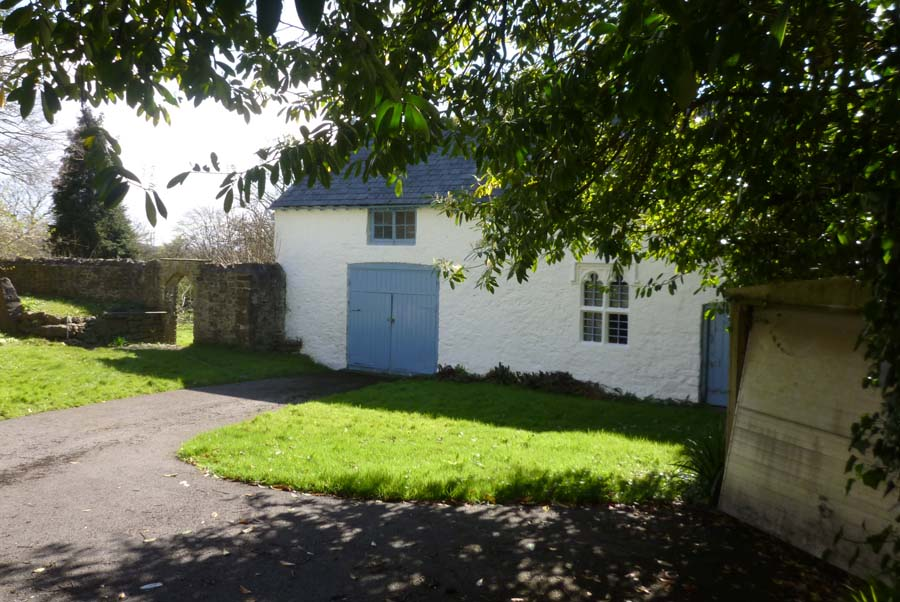
The Old Rectory, seen from the churchyard wall

The Old Rectory (or Old Parsonage) is an early building in St Andrews Major, Vale of Glamorgan, Wales, which was originally the house for the rectors of St Andrews Church.

== History and description ==
The building is believed to date from the 15th century and has two double-light windows either side of the door, which were probably brought from the next door church at this time. The building is L-shaped with two storeys, built of stone rubble and limewashed externally. When it was first described in 1771 the Rectory was partially tiled and partially thatched, though it currently has a slate roof. The 1771 record lists a hall, parlour, kitchen, cellar, dairy and brewhouse on the ground floor, with four chambers and a grain store above. While the two stone mullioned trefoil windows are original, the other openings are 19th century. In the 1800s the building became a carriage house.

During the English Civil War the Rectory's occupant, Dr Hugh Lloyd, was captured on the battlefield at the nearby Battle of St Fagans of 1648. After he was released at the end of the war he became Bishop of Llandaff.

A substantial new Rectory was built in 1830, replacing the Old Rectory, hence the Old Rectory became a carriage house in the garden of the new residence.

The Old Rectory gained a Grade II* heritage listing in 1963, as a "very rare medieval rectory" having group value with the church and other buildings.
