= Newbridge, New South Wales =

Coordinates: 33°34′S 149°22′E

Newbridge is a village of about 100 residents in New South Wales, Australia in Blayney Shire. It is approximately 30 km from Bathurst and 15 km from Blayney in the Central Tablelands of NSW. At the 2021 census, Newbridge had a population of 223 people.

== History ==
Newbridge village developed around the railway line and station which was built in 1876. The station was called Back Creek, however, the post office which opened two months later in the same year was called Duramana. To avoid confusion with Duramana on the other side of Bathurst and due to either the large number of Irish settlers in the area reflecting upon Newbridge in Ireland or as the result of the opening of a pedestrian overhead bridge built at the station in the 1870s, the station, post office and village were called Newbridge. During the 1880s, gold and iron was mined in the area.

The current village survives in relation to the farming community still present in the area. Buildings in the area that still stand from yesteryear include the Gladstone Hotel (early 1870s), the public school (1877), the original bakehouse (1884), the police station (1890s), the convent (1890), the new post office (1904) and the Catholic Church (1919).

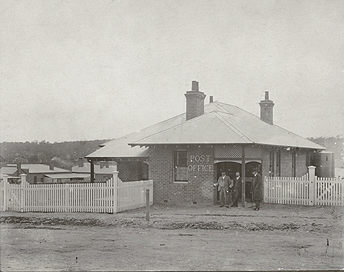
Newbridge Post Office during the early 20th Century.

On 5 May 2010, a fatal accident occurred 5 km from Newbridge Railway station, involving the Daily XPT and an excavator.

== Heritage listings ==
Newbridge has a number of heritage-listed sites, including:

- Main Western railway: Newbridge railway station
