= Carcoar =

- Town
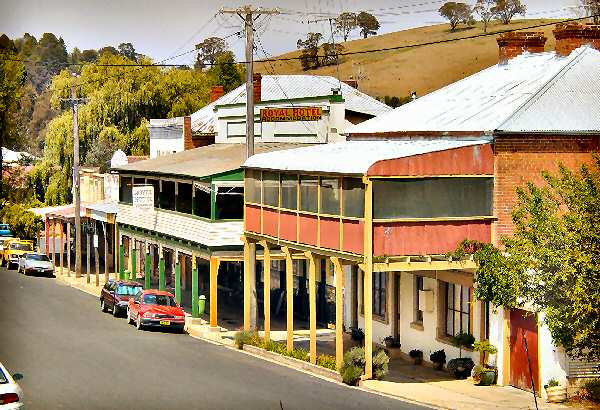
- Belubula Street

- Coordinates: 33°36′39.733″S 149°08′25.303″E
- Country: Australia
- State: New South Wales
- LGA: Blayney Shire
- Location: 258 km (160 mi) from Sydney; 52 km (32 mi) from Bathurst
- Established: 1839

Government
  - State electorate: Bathurst
  - Federal division: Calare
- Elevation: 720 m (2,360 ft)

Population
  - Total: 271 (SAL 2021)
- Postcode: 2791
- Mean max temp: 20.9 °C (69.6 °F)
- Mean min temp: 6.6 °C (43.9 °F)
- Annual rainfall: 784.6 mm (30.89 in)

Carcoar is a small town in the Central West region of New South Wales, Australia, in Blayney Shire. In 2021, the town had a population of 271 people. It is situated just off the Mid-Western Highway 258 km west of Sydney and 52 km south-west of Bathurst and is 720 m above sea level. It is located in a small green valley, with the township and buildings on both banks of the Belubula River. It is the third oldest settlement west of the Blue Mountains. Carcoar is a Gundungurra word meaning either 'frog' or 'kookaburra'. Nearby towns are Blayney, Millthorpe, Mandurama, Neville, Lyndhurst and Barry

It was once one of the most important government centres in Western New South Wales. The town has been classified by the National Trust due to the number of intact 19th-century buildings, with a significant amount of cultural materials relating to 19th century Australian life.

St Paul's Anglican Church is one of the oldest churches in the state, with graves dating back to the 1800s. It was reported in 2019 that the Anglican diocese plans to sell it to raise money for compensation for the church's sex abuse victims, a move which has outraged locals, who spent their own money on restorations.

== History ==
=== Settlers ===
The original occupants were the Wiradjuri Aboriginals. The first European to travel through the area was surveyor George Evans, who, heading south-west from Bathurst in 1815, sighted evidence of the Wiradjuri presence. Belubula has been identified as the Wiradjuri word for 'stony river'.

The first European settlers arrived in 1821. The first official land grant, comprising 560 acres (2.3 km^{2}), was issued to Thomas Icely on 26 May 1829. He named it Coombing.

In 1836 Carcoar locality consisted of a wayside inn kept by George Stammers, a blacksmith’s shop and a small store. In 1838 Thomas Icely requested that a village be established to service his large pastoral estate. On 29 September 1839 Carcoar became just the third settlement west of the Blue Mountains to be gazetted.

The first allotments in the town were sold in 1840. By 1850 Carcoar was the second most populous town west of the mountains, second in size only to Bathurst, and became a banking and administrative centre for the area. In 1857 the town's public school opened. It has continued to function as a school since that day, making it one of the oldest continuous schools in Australia.

The main street is Naylor Street. It was named after the first Anglican minister, the Reverend Thomas Beagley Naylor.

Tenders were called in March 1842 for the construction of a court house and lock up and these structures were built soon after. The court house also served as a place of worship. It was replaced by a second court house, of an Italianate design, that was commenced in 1879 and finished in 1882.

The discovery of gold further to the west in the mid-1860s started the decline of the town. The government began erecting a number of significant public buildings starting in the late 1870s.

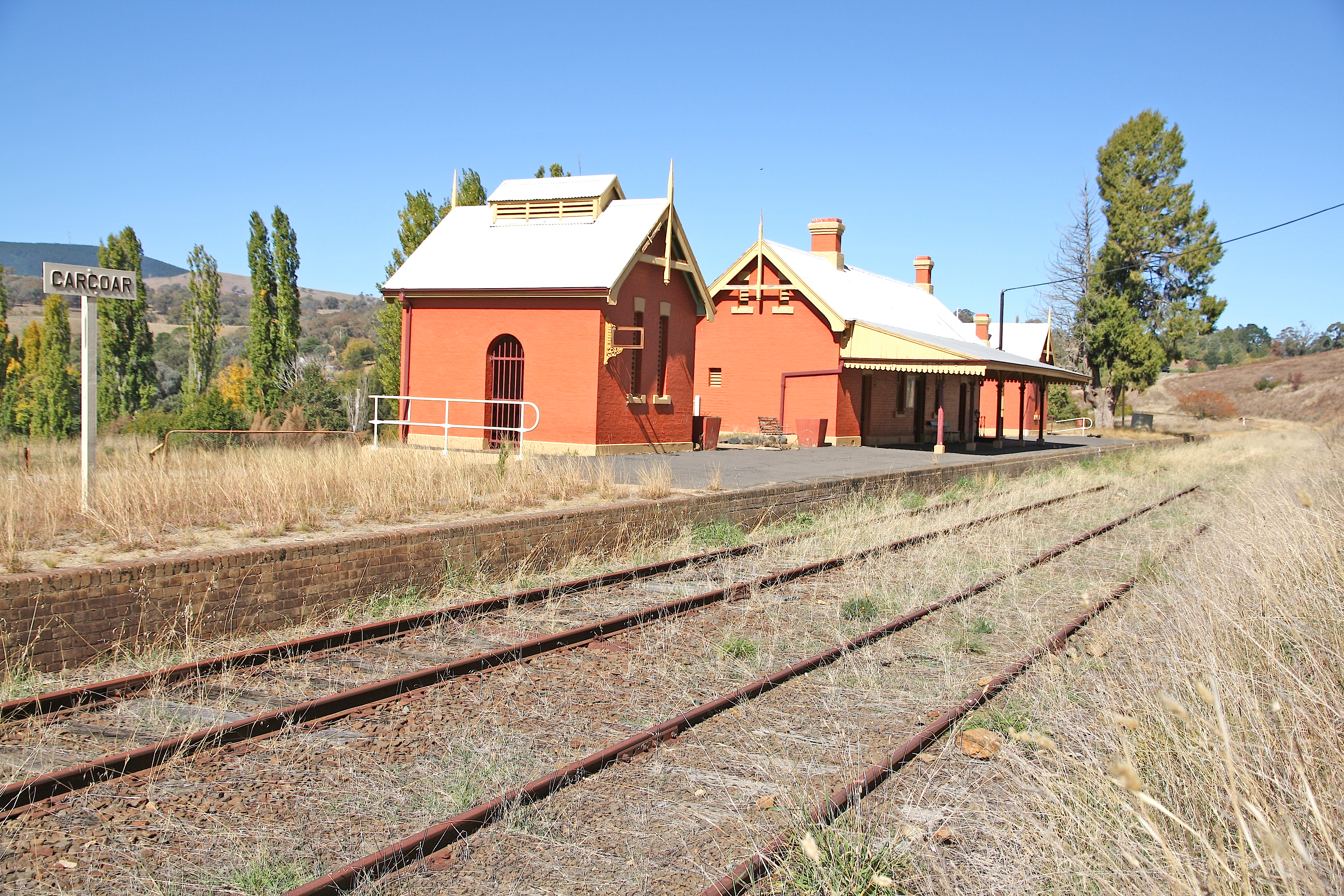
Carcoar Railway Station

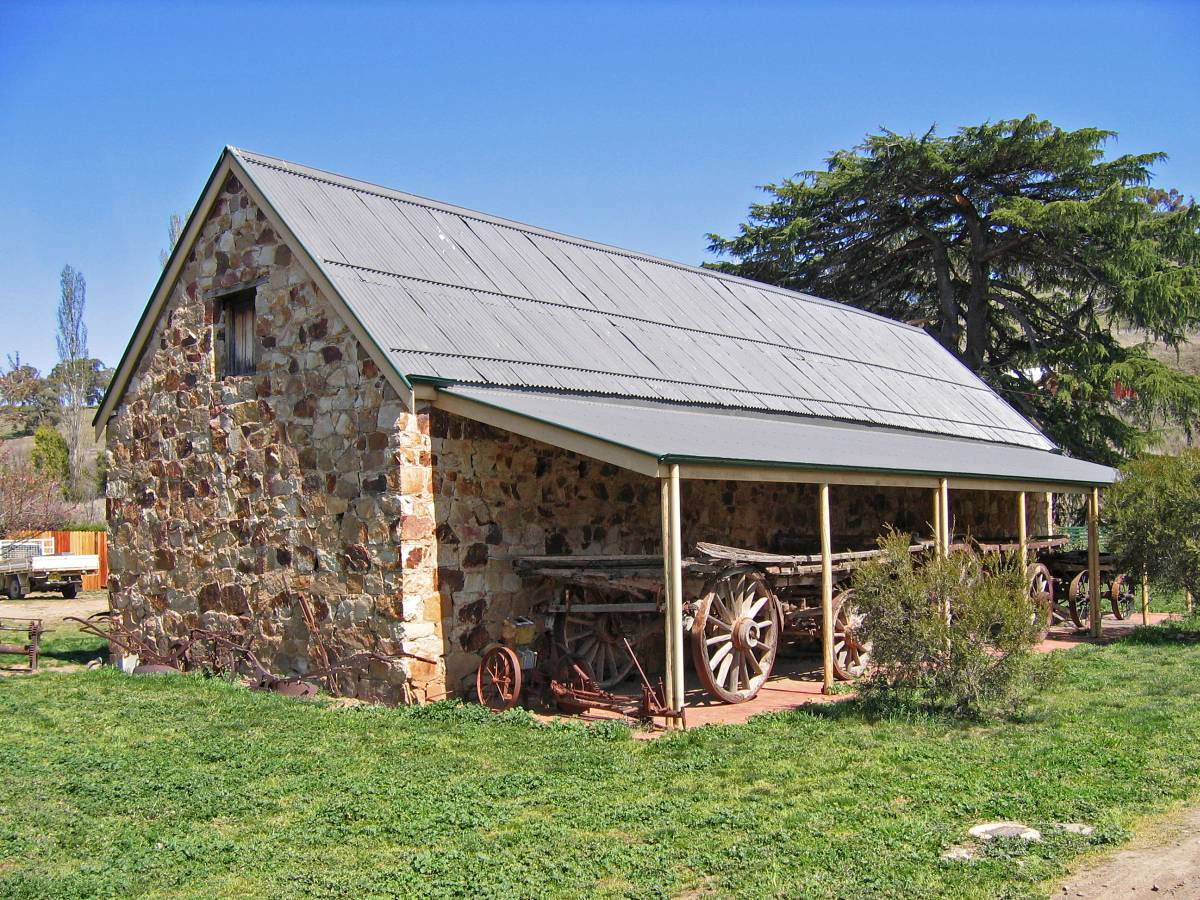
The Stoke Stable Museum, built by convict labour in 1849

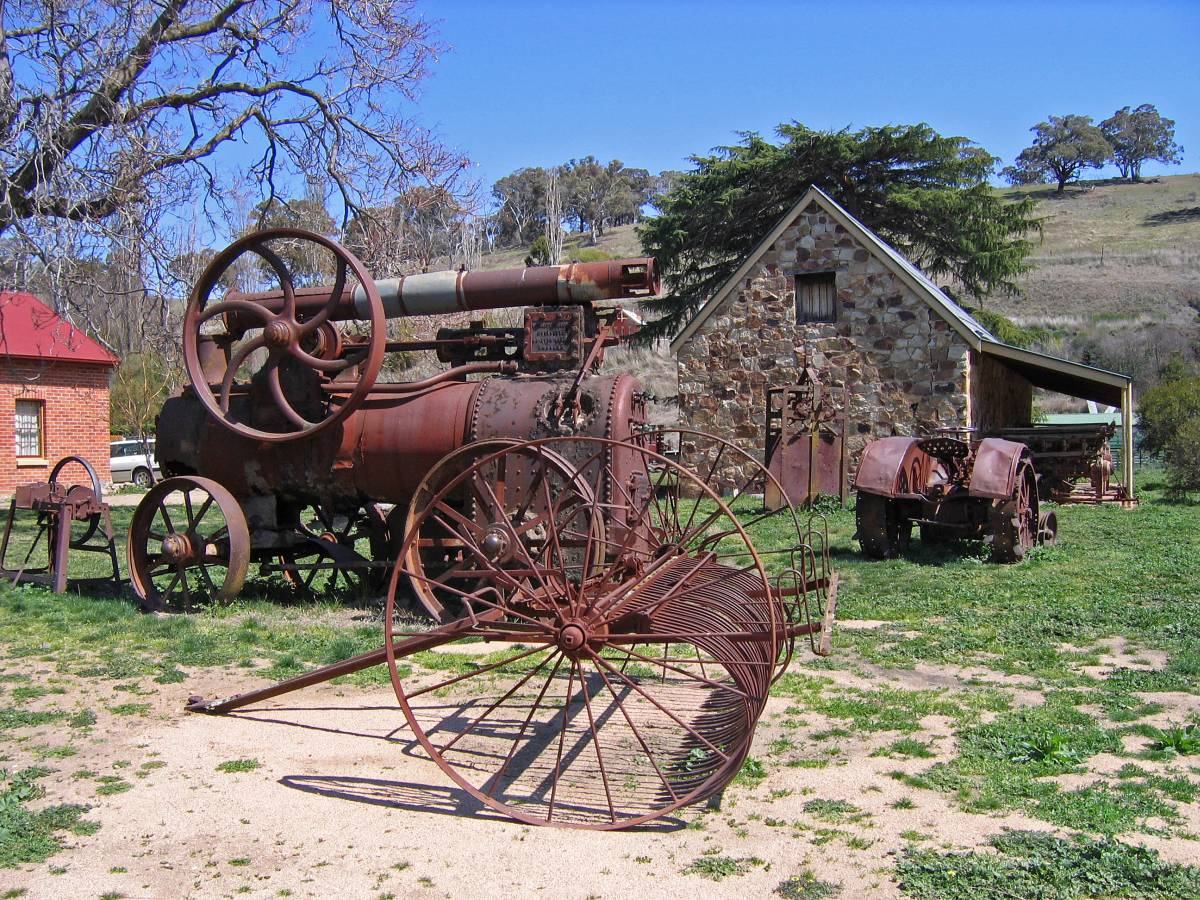
Historic machinery outside the Stoke Stable Museum

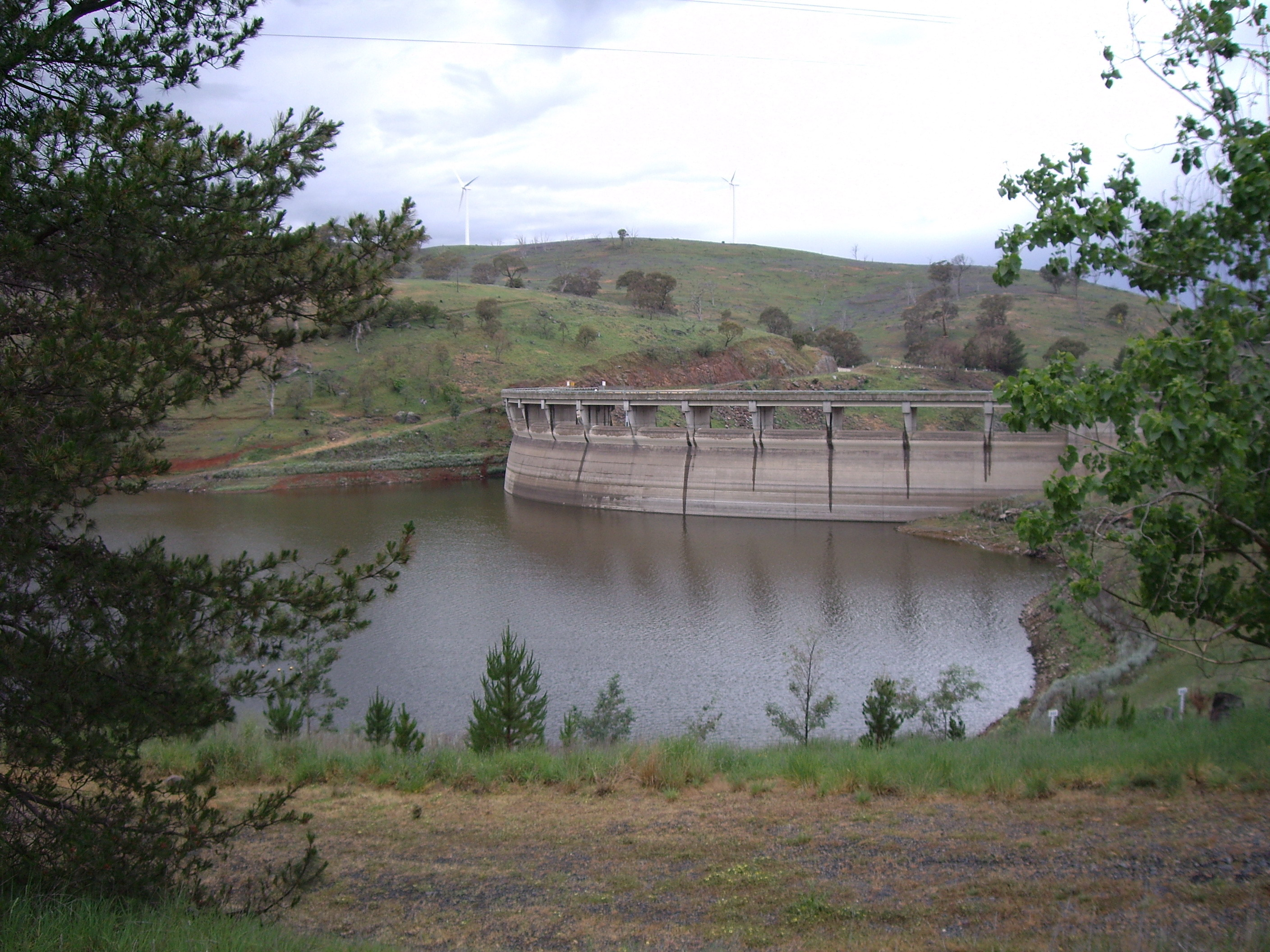
Carcoar Dam with Blayney Wind Farm in background

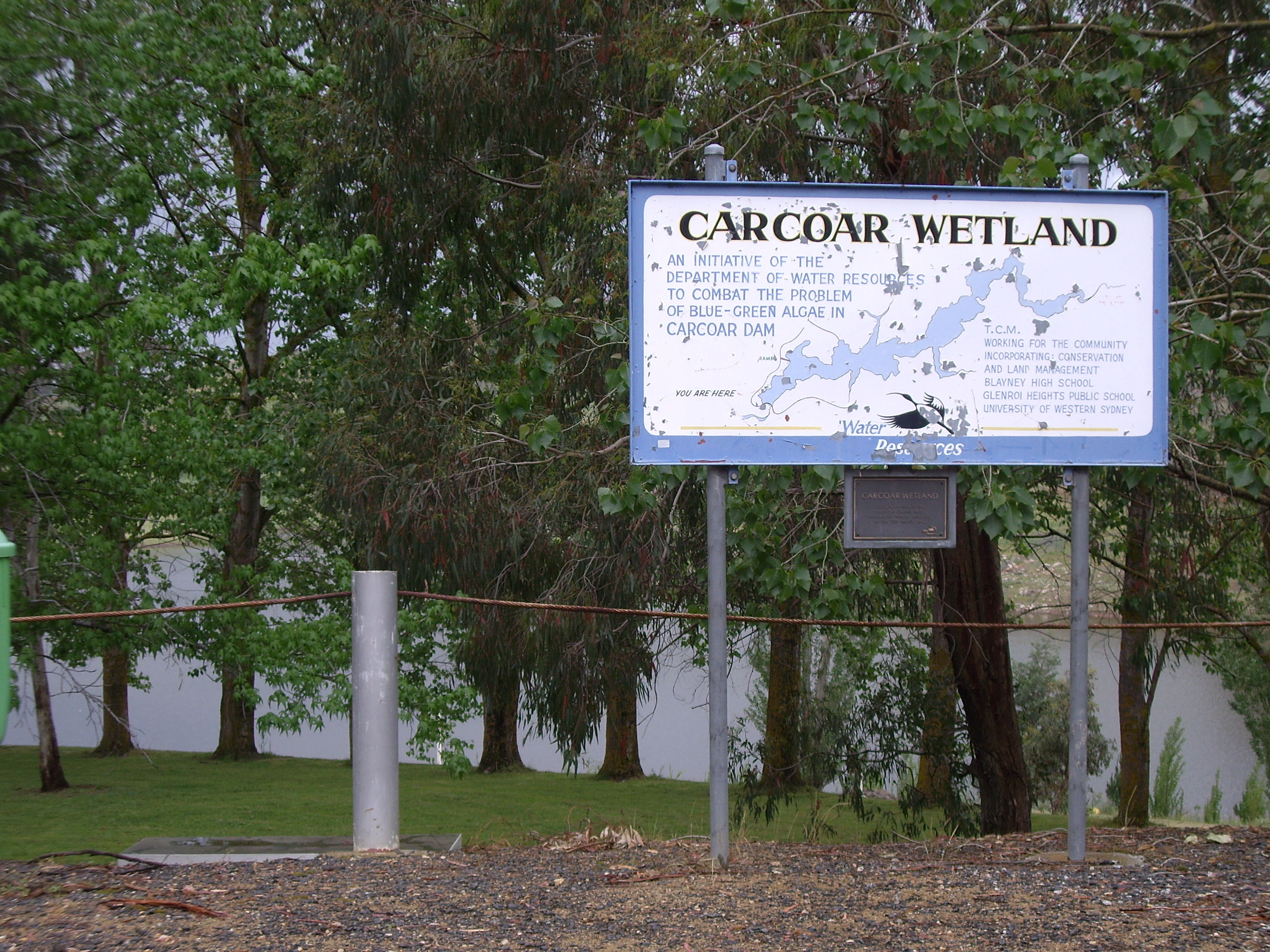
Carcoar Wetland

=== Railways ===
The location of the town at the bottom of a steep valley counted against it when it came to railway construction. Another blow came to the town when the railway went to Blayney (13 km to the North East) in 1874. By the early 1880s, the population was in decline. Carcoar was not on the railway line until 1888, when the Blayney–Demondrille railway line, which is an extension of the Main Southern Line, was constructed.

In the 1980s, passenger services were suspended between Cowra and Blayney (including Carcoar). This section was used by the Lachlan Valley Railway for many years until the line was closed in 2009.

=== Convicts and bushrangers ===
Carcoar's population growth in the mid-19th century also brought crime problems, with increased activity by local renegade convicts and bushrangers by the late 1830s. In response, local authorities threatened to impose martial law and withdraw all convict privileges in 1841. However, Carcoar's crime problems largely subsided following the capture of bushranger Paddy Curran, the arrival of a magistrate, and the addition of more police. The activity of Irish convicts-turned-bushrangers operating in Australia was the subject of ballads, including "The Wild Colonial Boy."

John Peisley, born in Bathurst in 1835, was a notorious horse thief in the area in the early 1850s. While imprisoned on Cockatoo Island near Sydney, now called Biloela, he met veteran prisoner Frank Gardiner, labelled a "Cockatoo Hand." Peisley received his ticket of leave in December 1860, conditional on his remaining in the Hunter River Valley. He absconded to the Abercrombie Rangies, where his parents had previously lived, and began a series of highway robberies in the south and west of Bathurst. Frank Gardiner joined him after two months, followed by Johnny Gilbert three weeks later. Peisley was captured in late January 1862, charged with murdering a Bigga innkeeper, and hanged at Bathurst. Frank Gardiner served imprisonment six years for horse theft; upon his release, he broke his parole and took up cattle thieving.

Two local men from the Mount Macquarie area (now Neville), long-term friends Mickey Bourke and Johnny Vane attempted to steal a racehorse from Coombing. In the process Bourke non-fatally shot stablehand German Charley, who tried to stop them, in the mouth. Bourke went on to join Ben Hall's bushranger gang.

On 13 July 1863, Ben Hall, with Johnny Gilbert and John O'Meally, held up the Carcoar Commercial Bank in broad daylight. This marked Australia's first bank robbery. It was thwarted when a bank teller fired a shot into the bank's ceiling, and the gang fled without seizing anything but shooting the manager as he was returning to the bank. The three, this time joined by Johnny Vane and Mickey Bourke, then held up a jeweller's shop and the Sportsman's Arms Hotel in Bathurst in broad daylight in October 1863. The gang escaped down George Street, exchanging shots with police. They returned three days later and robbed more stores, homes, and businesses on the outskirts of Bathurst. Weeks later, twenty-year-old Mickey Burke was shot in the stomach during a hold-up of Gold Commissioner Keightley in Rockley. Believing he was about to die, he shot himself in the head; still alive and in pain, Hall killed him.

Some time later, Ben Hall held up Presbyterian Reverend James Adam, who made such a good impression on the bushranger that Hall let him go without robbing him.

Ben Hall died in a gunfight near Forbes in May 1865 and was buried in the Forbes cemetery. In Ben Hall's three years as their leader, the gang robbed two mail coaches, committed 21 hold-ups, and stole 23 racehorses.

=== Mining ===
Copper was mined at nearby Coombing Park at various times between 1848 and 1878. Iron ore was also mined there from 1899 to 1923. There was also gold in the area, at the Three Mile Diggings to the west of Carcoar. Carcoar was the site of Australia's first documented uranium deposit, found in 1894. The uranium ore deposit was located within a cobalt mine—mined from 1888 to 1895—and was in the form of copper uranite.

=== Proposed national capital site ===
An area referred to as 'Forest Reefs', at the time, was one of the proposed sites for Australia's national capital. The area does not correspond with the modern-day locality of Forest Reefs. but lay immediately to the north of the township of Carcoar, upon which it bordered.

== Climate ==
Carcoar has hotter summers but also colder winters than Bathurst (a wider seasonal range), being further west. Sometimes snow can fall and sleet is often a feature in the winter months. Rainfall peaks somewhat in the winter and is lowest from high summer through to mid autumn; winters are significantly wetter than those at Bathurst.

Climate data for Carcoar (1907–1969, rainfall 1881–1970); 720 m AMSL; 33.62° S, 149.13° E
Month	Jan	Feb	Mar	Apr	May	Jun	Jul	Aug	Sep	Oct	Nov	Dec	Year
Mean daily maximum °C (°F)	29.8 (85.6)	29.2 (84.6)	26.3 (79.3)	21.0 (69.8)	15.8 (60.4)	12.3 (54.1)	11.5 (52.7)	13.4 (56.1)	17.4 (63.3)	21.3 (70.3)	24.9 (76.8)	28.2 (82.8)	20.9 (69.6)
Mean daily minimum °C (°F)	13.3 (55.9)	13.2 (55.8)	10.7 (51.3)	6.5 (43.7)	3.3 (37.9)	1.4 (34.5)	0.3 (32.5)	1.1 (34.0)	3.3 (37.9)	5.9 (42.6)	8.5 (47.3)	11.3 (52.3)	6.6 (43.8)
Average precipitation mm (inches)	62.5 (2.46)	50.5 (1.99)	50.9 (2.00)	52.1 (2.05)	59.5 (2.34)	85.4 (3.36)	78.1 (3.07)	78.3 (3.08)	64.9 (2.56)	78.5 (3.09)	63.0 (2.48)	60.9 (2.40)	784.6 (30.88)
Average precipitation days (≥ 0.2 mm)	6.2	5.4	5.6	6.0	8.2	10.8	10.9	10.6	8.8	8.5	6.8	6.3	94.1
Source: Australian Bureau of Meteorology; Carcoar

== Heritage listings ==
Carcoar has a number of heritage-listed sites, including:

- Belubula Street: Old Rectory
- Blayney-Harden railway: Carcoar railway station
- Icely Street: Carcoar School of Arts
- Icely Street: The Saddlery

== Demographics ==
In the 2016 Census, there were 200 people in Carcoar. 88.2% of people were born in Australia and 94.4% of people spoke only English at home.

Historical population
Year	Pop.	±%
1921	515	—
1933	478	−7.2%
1947		—
1954		—
1961		—
1966		—
1971	378	—
1976	335	−11.4%
1981	277	−17.3%
1986	244	−11.9%
1991	242	−0.8%
1996	223	−7.9%
2001		—
2006	218	—
2011	200	−8.3%
2016	200	+0.0%
2021	271	+35.5%
Source: Australian Bureau of Statistics data.

== Events ==
=== Down to Earth Gardening Expo and Plant Fair ===
Held at the Carcoar Show Ground on the last Sunday in April this event highlights ecology and sustainability along with the relaxation and pleasure to be derived from gardening. The Down to Earth Gardening Expo and Plant Fair is held annually and attracts stallholders and visitors from far and wide.

=== Carcoar Cup Running Festival ===
The first weekend in November sees the staging of the Carcoar Cup Running Festival. Begun in 2011, it has become an iconic event on the Australia Running calendar, hosting a marathon, teams marathon, half marathon, 10K special, 6K Creek Dash, and Carcoar Cup for Kids. Runners come from over 170 different towns and cities throughout Australia and overseas. The event has been recognised as NSW Regional Flagships Event for the last several years.

=== Carcoar Show ===
An annual agricultural show held on the last weekend of October with judged events ranging from flower arranging to stud cattle and heavy horse snigging and pulling competitions.

=== Australia Day Fair ===
The annual festival for Australia Day swells the population of Carcoar to over 3000. The streets are lined with stalls. There are stage coach rides, entertainment, refreshments and historical reenactment of local history.

== Film and television ==
In recent years the town has been used as a location for numerous film and television productions including Jessica (starring Sam Neill), Let the Balloon Go, Brides of Christ, Tommy the Kid, Peter Allen: Not the Boy Next Door (2015), Backtrack (2015) and Ten Pound Poms (2023).

== Notable residents ==
- Kurt Fearnley, wheelchair athletics world champion who also crawled the 96 km Kokoda Trail in November 2009.
- Havelock Ellis, physician, psychologist, writer, social reformer who was a pioneer in the study of human sexuality. In the 1870s Ellis spent a year as a tutor for a family living a few miles from Carcoar, before becoming a master at a grammar school in Grafton.
- Edwina Bartholomew, journalist and her husband Neil Varcoe own a hotel in town.

== Panoramic view ==
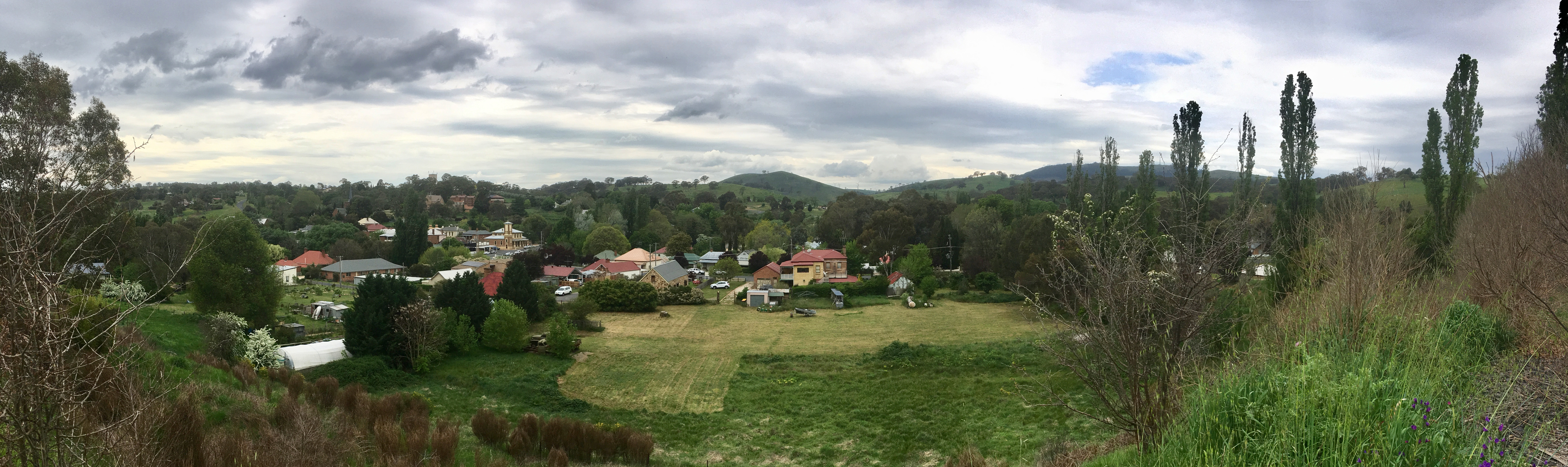

Panoramic view of Carcoar taken from nearby hill
