= Neville, New South Wales =

Neville
- Town
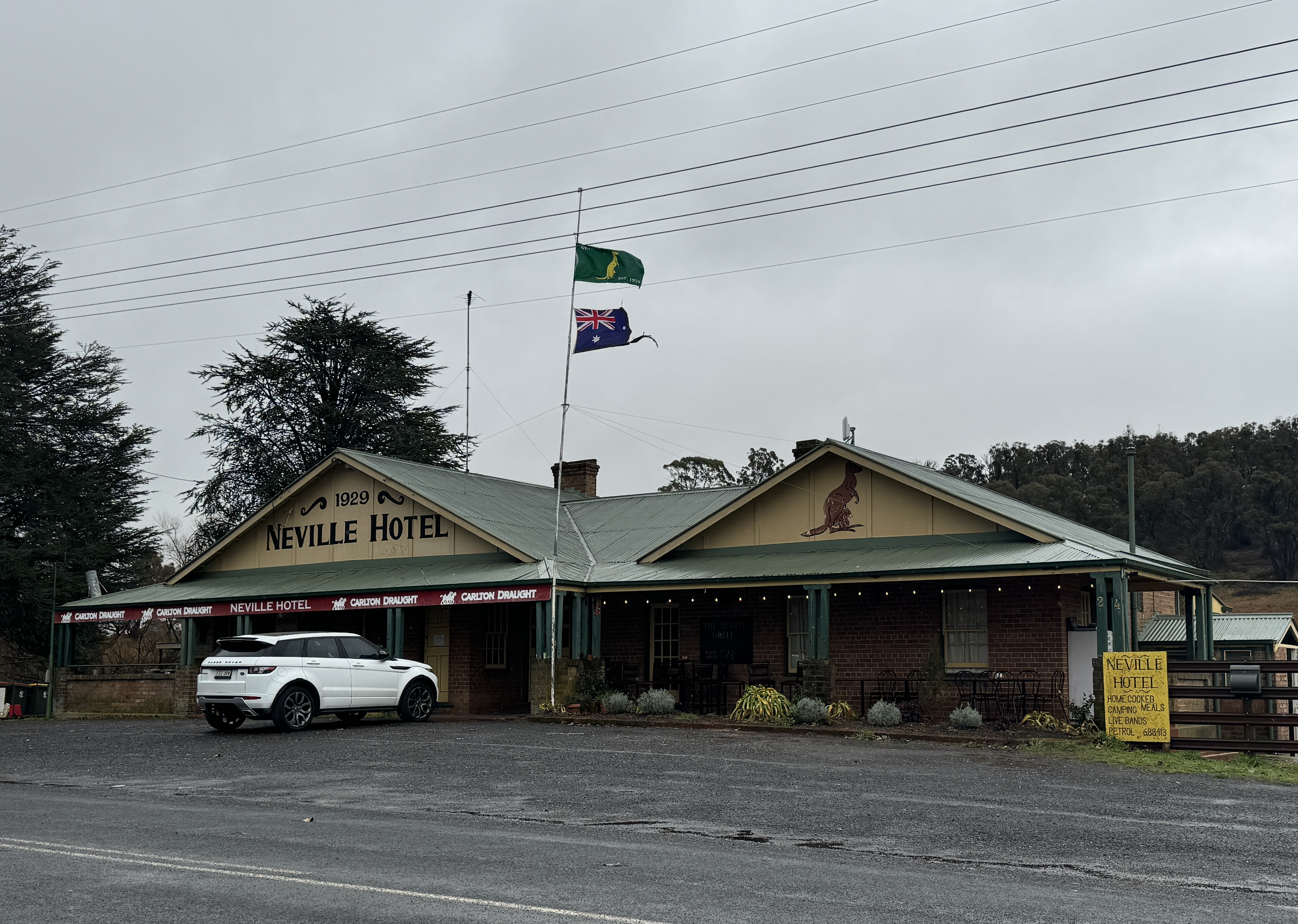
- Neville Hotel, July 2024

- Interactive map of Neville
- Coordinates: 33°41′54″S 149°12′4″E
- Country: Australia
- State: New South Wales
- LGA: Blayney Shire
- Location: 253 km (157 mi) from Sydney; 56 km (35 mi) from Bathurst; 24 km (15 mi) from Blayney

Government
  - State electorate: Bathurst
  - Federal division: Calare
- Elevation: 940 m (3,080 ft)

Population
  - Total: 229 (2021 census)
- Postcode: 2799
- County: Bathurst County

Neville is a small village in the south-east of New South Wales, Australia, in Blayney Shire. It is 60 km south west of Bathurst or about 16 km south-east of Mandurama. It is 940 metres above sea level and has a population of 229 people.

== History ==
European settlement of the area began soon after the establishment of Bathurst in 1815, but the exact time is still unclear. The village was known by different names before it was finally called Neville in 1888. Other names previous to Neville include "No-one swamp" or "Number one Swamp" (the creek that it is on) and Macquarie in reference to Lachlan Macquarie, an early governor of New South Wales, and then "Mount Macquarie" which the nearby Mount Macquarie is still called.

Another possibility is that Neville was a stagecoach stop on the direct road from Rockley to Cowra. The modern city of Cowra was built in a region previously called "The Lachlan". The road joining Rockley to "The Lachlan" was called "The Old Lachlan Road". Fragments of the "Old Lachlan Road" still exist near Rockley, north of Hobbys Yards, south of Woodstock and in Neville.

== Features ==
Several of the old buildings were erected during the time Neville was called Mount Macquarie, such as the school built in 1858 which is still used today. Several churches were built during the late 19th century. The Uniting church still conducts several services each year and the tiny Presbyterian church is available for special occasions. The other remaining church - the former Church of England church has been converted into a house. A public hall was built in 1890, and is still used for public and private functions today, and sometime later a Federal Store. There is a hotel, which was built in 1929 after the original Neville Hotel was destroyed in a fire. Many homes within the town date back to the late 19th and early 20th centuries.

== Neville today ==
The Valley Store of H.H.May, once an agent for Palings Music & Pianos, Yates seeds and Clyde Engineering products for farming (1880s) is now the Golden Era Piano Museum.

Neville Siding was established in 1987 by Ted and Betty Wilson to provide an accommodation facility for visitors.

The railway line through Blayney makes possible visitation to the area and roads link the village to major centres such as the historic towns of Carcoar and Cowra to the south.

Neville can be reached by travelling the difficult road from Carcoar over Mount Macquarie which is partially surrounded by the Neville State Pine Forest. Neville is picturesque from the top of this mountain with forest creeping to its peak and a snow-covered outlook at times during the winter.

== Notable residents ==
Bushrangers John Vane and Michael Burke were members of the Ben Hall's gang.
