= Blayney Shire =

- Local government area
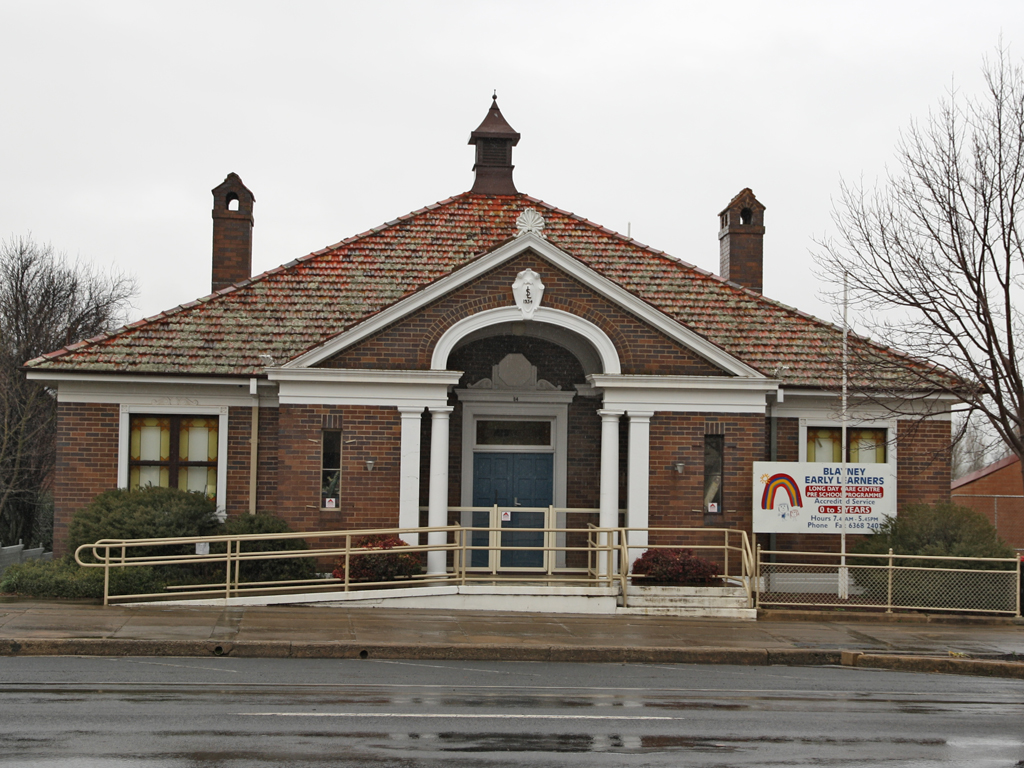
- Council Chambers, Blayney

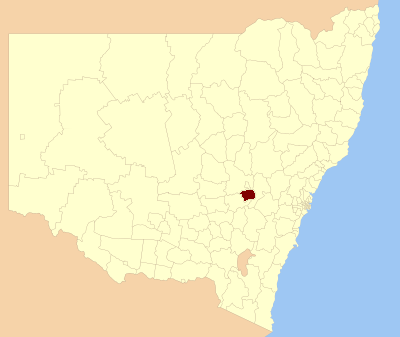
- Location in New South Wales
- Interactive map of Blayney Shire
- Coordinates: 33°32′S 149°15′E
- Country: Australia
- State: New South Wales
- Region: Central West
- Council seat: Blayney

Government
  - Mayor: Bruce Reynolds (Independent
  - State electorate: Bathurst
  - Federal division: Calare

Area
  - Total: 1,525 km^{2} (589 sq mi)

Population
  - Totals: 7,257 (2016 census); 7,342 (2018 est.)
  - Density: 4.7587/km^{2} (12.325/sq mi)
- Website: Blayney Shire
LGAs around Blayney Shire
Cabonne	Orange	Bathurst
Cabonne	Blayney Shire	Bathurst
Cowra	Cowra	Bathurst

Blayney Shire is a local government area in the Central West region of New South Wales, Australia. The Shire is located adjacent to the Mid-Western Highway and the Main Western railway line, and is centred on the town of Blayney.

Blayney Shire consists of approximately 1,600 square kilometres (620 sq mi) of well watered, gently undulating to hilly country and the climate is partially suitable for cool climate crops and trees. There is also significant mining industry in the shire.

== Towns and localities ==
Towns and localities within the Blayney Shire are:

- Blayney (Town)
- Athol (Locality)
- Barry (Village)
- Carcoar (Village)
- Forest Reefs (Locality)
- Garland (Locality)
- Hobbys Yards (Village)
- Junction Reefs (Locality)
- Kings Plains (Locality)
- Lyndhurst (Village)
- Mandurama (Village)
- Millthorpe (Village)
- Neville (Village)
- Newbridge (Village)
- Wombiana (Locality)
- Gallymont (Locality)
- Burnt Yards (Locality)
- Errowanbang (Locality)
- Panuara (Locality)
- Tallwood (Locality)
- Moorilda (Locality)

== Demographics ==
Selected historical census data for Blayney Shire local government area
Census year		2011	2016
Population	Estimated residents on census night	6,985	▲7,257
Population	LGA rank in terms of size within New South Wales		100th
Population	% of New South Wales population		
Population	% of Australian population		
Cultural and language diversity			
Ancestry, top responses	Australian	35.0%	35.4%
Ancestry, top responses	English	32.0%	31.1%
Ancestry, top responses	Irish	11.1%	10.9%
Ancestry, top responses	Chinese	7.4%	7.4%
Ancestry, top responses	German	2.3%	2.4%
Language, top responses (other than English)	German	n/a	0.2%
Language, top responses (other than English)	Arabic	0.2%	0.2%
Language, top responses (other than English)	Cantonese	n/a	0.2%
Language, top responses (other than English)	Tamil	n/a	0.1%
Language, top responses (other than English)	French	n/a	0.1%
Religious affiliation			
Religious affiliation, top responses	Catholic	31.0%	28.6%
Religious affiliation, top responses	Anglican	27.9%	24.2%
Religious affiliation, top responses	No religion	14.4%	20.8%
Religious affiliation, top responses	Not stated	not reported	8.5%
Religious affiliation, top responses	Uniting Church	7.6%	6.8%
Median weekly incomes			
Personal income	Median weekly personal income	A$553	A$620
Personal income	% of Australian median income	%	%
Family income	Median weekly family income	A$1376	A$1581
Family income	% of Australian median income	%	%
Household income	Median weekly household income	A$1092	A$1227
Household income	% of Australian median income	%	%

== Council ==
=== Current composition and election method ===
Blayney Shire Council is composed of seven councillors elected proportionally as a single ward. All councillors are elected for a fixed four-year term of office. The mayor is elected by the councillors at the first meeting of the council. The most recent election was held on 14 September 2024, and the makeup of the council is as follows:

Party	Councillors
Independent	6
Independent National	1
Total	7

The current Council, elected in 2024, is:

Councillor	Party	Notes
Bruce Reynolds	Independent National	Mayor
Stephen Johnston	Independent	Elected February 2025 on a countback following the resignation of Michelle Pryse Jones
Karl Hutchings	Independent	
John Newstead	Independent	
Craig Gosewisch	Independent	
Rebecca Scott	Independent	Deputy Mayor
Iris Dorsett	Independent	

== Election results ==
=== 2024 ===
2024 New South Wales local elections: Blayney
Party	Candidate	Votes	%	±%
Independent National	Bruce Reynolds (elected)	1,074	23.6	+9.7
Independent	Michelle Pryse Jones (elected)	629	13.8	+0.6
Independent	Karl Hutchings (elected)	622	13.7	
Independent	John Newstead (elected)	556	12.2	+3.1
Independent	Craig Gosewisch (elected)	485	10.7	−1.6
Independent	Rebecca Scott (elected)	450	9.9	
Independent	Iris Dorsett (elected)	394	8.7	+1.2
Independent	Stephen Johnston	264	5.8	
Independent	Angus Norton	73	1.6	
Total formal votes		4,547	94.1	
Informal votes		284	5.9	
Turnout		4,831	86.8	

=== 2021 ===
2021 New South Wales local elections: Blayney
Party	Candidate	Votes	%	±%
Independent	Scott Ferguson (elected)	1,036	22.7	
Independent	Bruce Reynolds (elected)	635	13.9	
Independent	Michelle Pryse Jones (elected)	605	13.3	
Independent	Craig Gosewisch (elected)	559	12.3	
Independent	Allan Ewin (elected)	526	11.5	
Independent	David Somervaille (elected)	443	9.7	
Independent	John Newstead (elected)	416	9.1	
Independent	Iris Dorsett	340	7.5	
Total formal votes		4,560	95.3	
Informal votes		224	4.7	
Turnout		4,784	87.7	

=== 2017 ===
2017 New South Wales local elections: Blayney
Party	Candidate	Votes	%	±%
Independent	Scott Ferguson (elected)	1,329	30.9	+19.4
Independent	Allan Ewin (elected)	605	14.1	−3.9
Independent	David Kingham (elected)	447	10.4	−0.1
Country Labor	Scott Denton (elected)	418	9.7	+9.7
Independent	John Newstead (elected)	416	9.1	
Independent	Bruce Reynolds (elected)	393	9.1	+9.1
Independent	David Somervaille (elected)	311	7.2	−0.1
Greens		272	6.3	+6.3
Independent	Nyree Reynolds	139	3.2	+3.2
Total formal votes		4,299	94.82	
Informal votes		235	5.18	
Turnout		4,784	85.73	

== Proposed amalgamation ==
A 2015 review of local government boundaries recommended that the Blayney Shire merge with the Cabonne Shire and the City of Orange to form a new council with an area of 7,833 square kilometres (3,024 sq mi) and support a population of approximately 63,000. Despite originally planning for the amalgamation to go ahead, the merger scheduled for May 2016 was delayed due to legal action, and in February 2017 the NSW Government decided not to proceed with the amalgamation.

== See also ==
- List of local government areas in New South Wales
