= The Blayney Advocate and Carcoar Herald =

Former newspaper in New South Wales, Australia

The Blayney Advocate and Carcoar Herald was an English language newspaper published in Blayney, New South Wales, Australia.

Front page of The Blayney Advocate and Carcoar Herald, 1 January 1898

== History ==
The Blayney Advocate and Carcoar Herald was first published on 1 January 1898 by John Mellor. It was published weekly on Saturday mornings with yearly subscriptions costing sixteen shillings. The newspaper ceased publication on 31 December 1904.

== Digitisation ==
The Blayney Advertiser and Carcoar Herald has been digitised as part of the Australian Newspapers Digitisation Program of the National Library of Australia.

== See also ==
- List of newspapers in New South Wales
- List of newspapers in Australia
