= Peter McCann (Australian footballer) =

Australian rules footballer

Personal information
- Full name: Peter John McCann
- Born: 25 June 1882; Blayney, New South Wales
- Died: 16 August 1961 (aged 79); Millthorpe, New South Wales
- Original team: Albury

Playing career^{1}
Years	Club	Games (Goals)
1904	South Melbourne	1 (0)
1907	Essendon	1 (0)
Total		2 (0)
- ^{1} Playing statistics correct to the end of 1907.

Peter John McCann (25 June 1882 – 16 August 1961) was an Australian rules footballer who played with South Melbourne and Essendon in the Victorian Football League (VFL).
