= Grand Western Lodge =

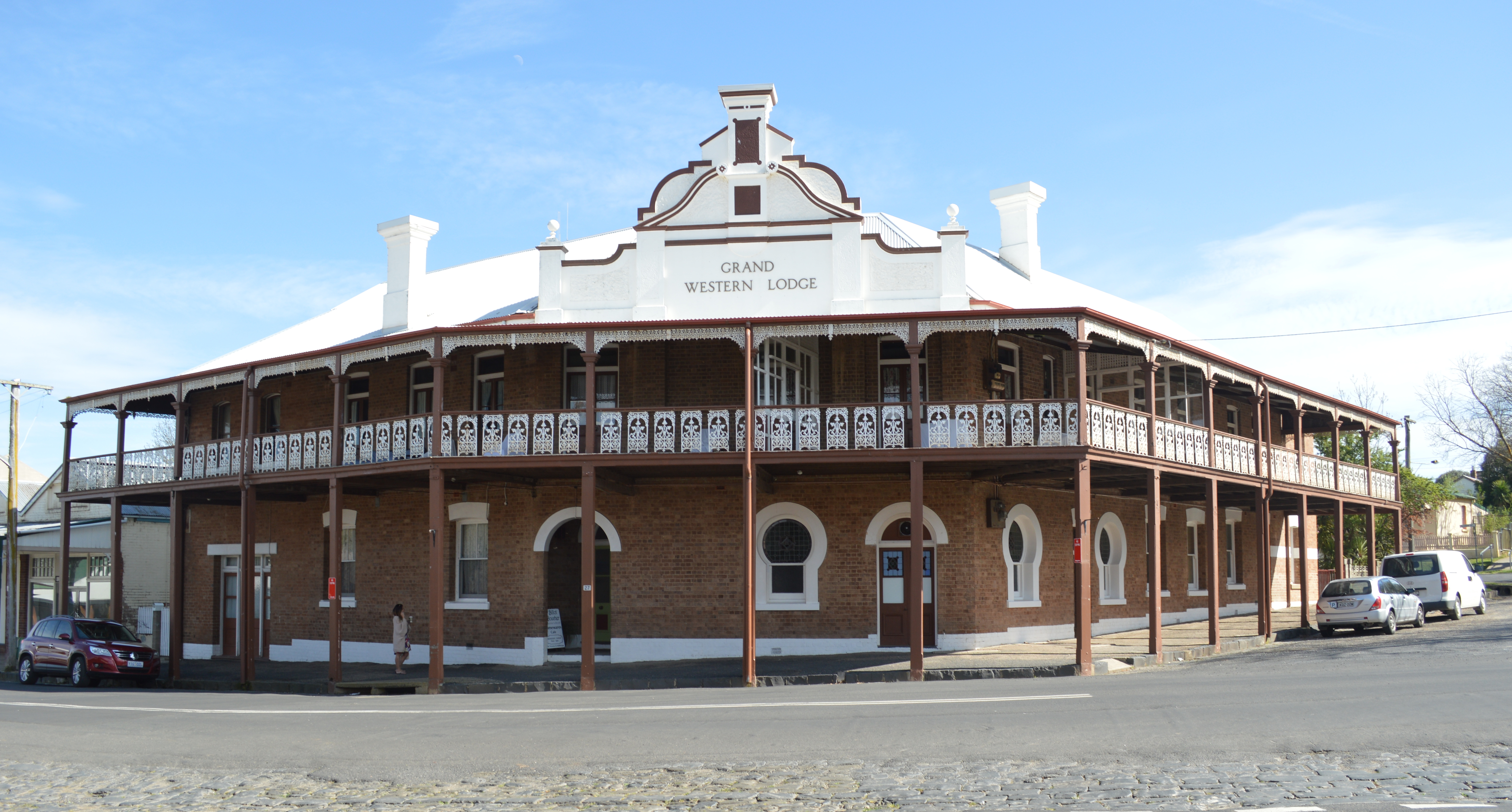

- Location within New South Wales Location within Australia
- 33.4462°S 149.1838°E
- Location: 27 Victoria Street, Millthorpe, Blayney Shire, New South Wales, Australia

Site notes
- Owner: Avibin Pty Ltd

New South Wales Heritage Register
- Official name: Grand Western Lodge (former); Grand Western Lodge
- Type: state heritage (built)
- Designated: 2 April 1999
- Reference no.: 427
- Type: Hotel
- Category: Commercial
- Builders: John Wells

The Grand Western Lodge is an Australian heritage-listed former hotel and boarding house. It is located at 27 Victoria Street, Millthorpe, New South Wales, in the Central West region of the state. The hotel was built by John Wells. It is also known as Grand Western Lodge Hotel. It was added to the New South Wales State Heritage Register on 2 April 1999.

== History ==
The Grand Western Lodge was constructed in 1901 for John Frape by builder John Wells. Occupying an important site in the centre of town, the Grand Western Lodge was built in the hey day of rural development in the district to cater for many visitors, particularly for attending the ploughing demonstrations and competitions.

It closed as a hotel in 1961.

In 1982 the owners of the Grand Western Lodge applied for funding to assist in the restoration of the verandahs. Through the Heritage Assistance program a grant was provided to the owner and the verandah were subsequently restored. As one of the conditions attached to the assistance, the owner applied to the Minister for the making of a Permanent Conservation Order. In 1987, through the Heritage Assistance Program a further interest free loan was granted to Adrian Powell to assist in additional work required for the two-storey verandah. This work was completed in 1988. A Permanent Conservation Order was placed over the Grand Western Lodge on 11 April 1986. On 2 April 1999 the Grand Western Lodge was added to the State Heritage Register.

In 1987, the building was converted into a licensed boarding house for people with disabilities, which operated until 2011. In 2011, the Department of Ageing, Disability and Home Care prosecuted the owner for obstructing access to departmental staff and exercised rarely used powers under the Guardianship Act to remove residents from the facility. It had been the subject of three critical Ombudsman reports in nine years and had been subject to allegations regarding punishment of residents, illegal use of medication and financial control of residents by management both before the Guardianship Tribunal and in the media. The facility was defended by some residents, in particular for having taken in people after the closure of larger institutions; media reports acknowledged that some residents wished to stay.

In October 2011, New South Wales Police initiated Strike Force Calendo to investigate allegations regarding the boarding house, including "missing and located persons, alleged assaults, attempted suicides and fire". Advocacy group People With Disability sought $15 million from the NSW government in damages for the residents.

In 2013, former residents initiated a class action against the boarding house manager, the building owner and the department over alleged abuses at the Grand Western Lodge, alleging that residents had been bashed, held in solitary confinement, subject to "massive unprescribed doses of psychotropic medications" to sedate residents "deemed out of control", had been poorly fed and were working for little or no pay. The Sydney Morning Herald described the facility as a "house of horrors" and stated that residents' stories "still send a shiver down the spine". In October 2016, the case settled for $4.05 million.

In June 2018, the building was for sale, advertised as being suitable for a multiple accommodation facility, retail, bed and breakfast or disability services.

In late 2022 the building re-opened as small boutique hotel following a multi million dollar refurbishment. With 19 rooms, and 11 bathrooms, the hotel has been stylishly refitted to suit its heritage status.

== Description ==
Grand Western Lodge is a large two storey face brick hotel. The building is a good example of an Edwardian pub having unusual key hole form windows and pictorial leadlight glazing. The dominant architectural features include the well designed two storey verandah with cast iron balustrading and valance work and the massive stuccoed central parapet.

Little of the original fabric remains on the interior of the building.

== Heritage listing ==
The Grand Western Lodge is a large two storey face brick hotel built in 1901 for John Frape by builder John Wells. Occupying an important site in the centre of town, the Grand Western lodge was built in the hey day of rural development in the district to cater for many visitors, particularly for attending the ploughing demonstrations and competitions. The building is a good example of an Edwardian pub having unusual key hole form windows and pictorial leadlight glazing. The dominant architectural features include the well designed two storey verandah with cast iron balustrading and valance work and the massive stuccoed central parapet.

Grand Western Lodge was listed on the New South Wales State Heritage Register on 2 April 1999 having satisfied the following criteria.

The place is important in demonstrating the course, or pattern, of cultural or natural history in New South Wales.

Grand Western Lodge is a large two storey face brick hotel built in 1901 for John Frape by builder John Wells. Occupying an important site in the centre of town, the Grand Western lodge was built in the hey day of rural development in the district to cater for many visitors, particularly for attending the ploughing demonstrations and competitions.

The place is important in demonstrating aesthetic characteristics and/or a high degree of creative or technical achievement in New South Wales.

The building is a good example of an Edwardian pub having unusual key hole form windows and pictorial leadlight glazing. The dominant architectural features include the well designed two storey verandah with cast iron balustrading and valance work and the massive stuccoed central parapet.
