= Blayney railway station =

Railway station in New South Wales, Australia

Blayney
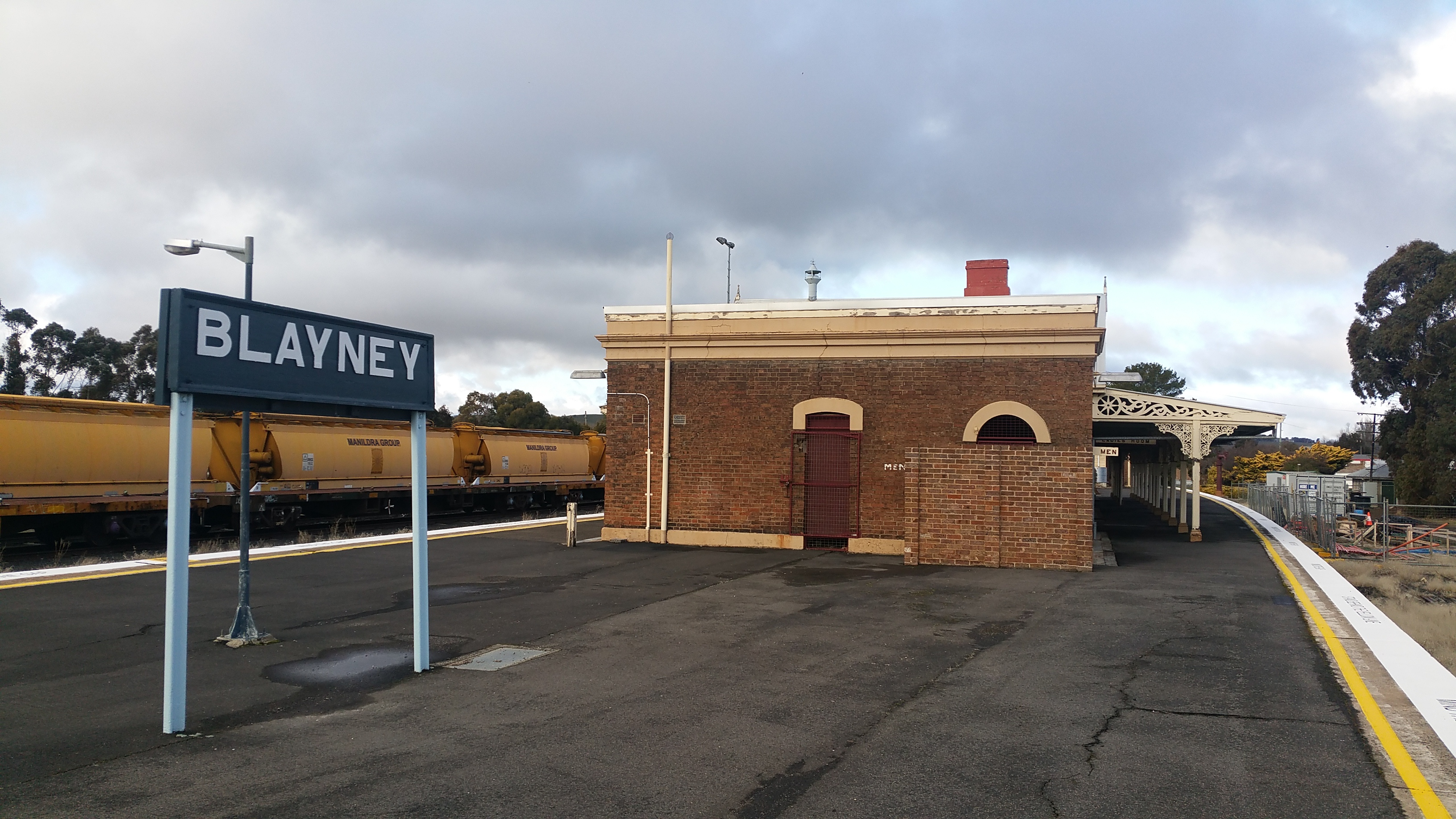

General information
- Location: Railway Lane, Blayney; Australia
- Coordinates: 33°31′38″S 149°15′16″E
- Owner: Transport Asset Manager of New South Wales
- Operator: NSW TrainLink
- Lines: Main Western; Blayney–Demondrille
- Distance: 290.37 kilometres (180.43 mi) from Central
- Platforms: 1
- Tracks: 2

Construction
- Structure type: Ground
- Accessible: Yes

Other information
- Station code: BLA

History
- Opened: 1 November 1876

Services
Preceding station	NSW TrainLink	Following station
Orange towards Broken Hill	NSW TrainLink Western Line Broken Hill Outback Xplorer	Bathurst towards Sydney
Millthorpe towards Dubbo	NSW TrainLink Western Line Dubbo XPT	Bathurst towards Sydney
Location

Blayney railway station is a heritage-listed railway station on the Main Western line that serves Blayney, in the Central West region of New South Wales, Australia. The property was added to the New South Wales State Heritage Register on 2 April 1999.

== History ==
The station opened on 1 November 1876 when the line was extended from Bathurst. In 1888, it became a junction station with the opening of the Blayney–Demondrille line.

Opposite the platform lies an intermodal freight transport depot that opened in 1994.

== Services ==
Blayney is served by NSW TrainLink's daily Central West XPT service operating between Sydney and Dubbo and the weekly Outback Xplorer between Sydney and Broken Hill.

NSW TrainLink road coach services operating between Lithgow, Orange and Grenfell also serve the station.

Platform	Line	Stopping pattern	Notes
1	Western Region	services to Sydney Central, Dubbo & Broken Hill	

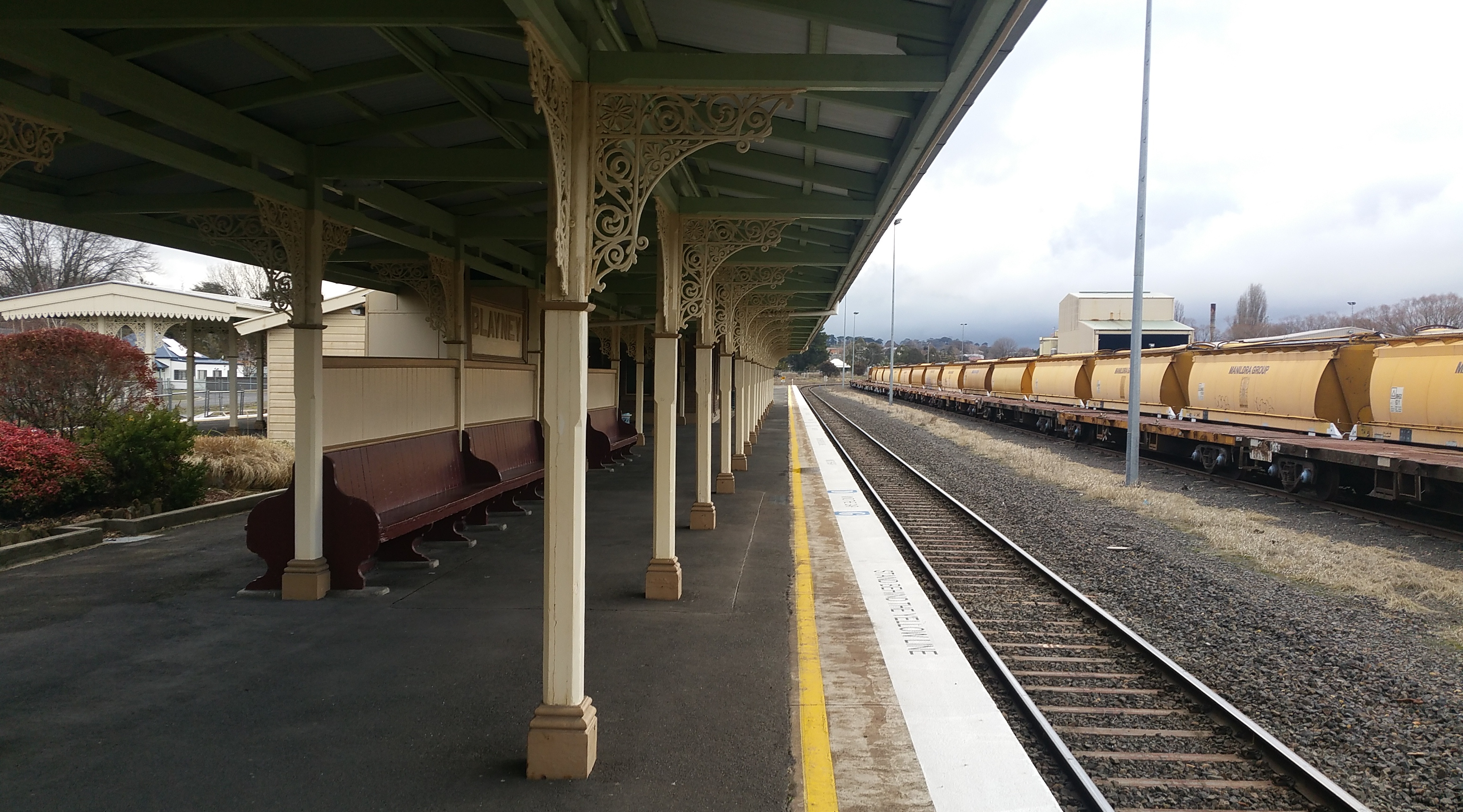
Northbound view on main platform

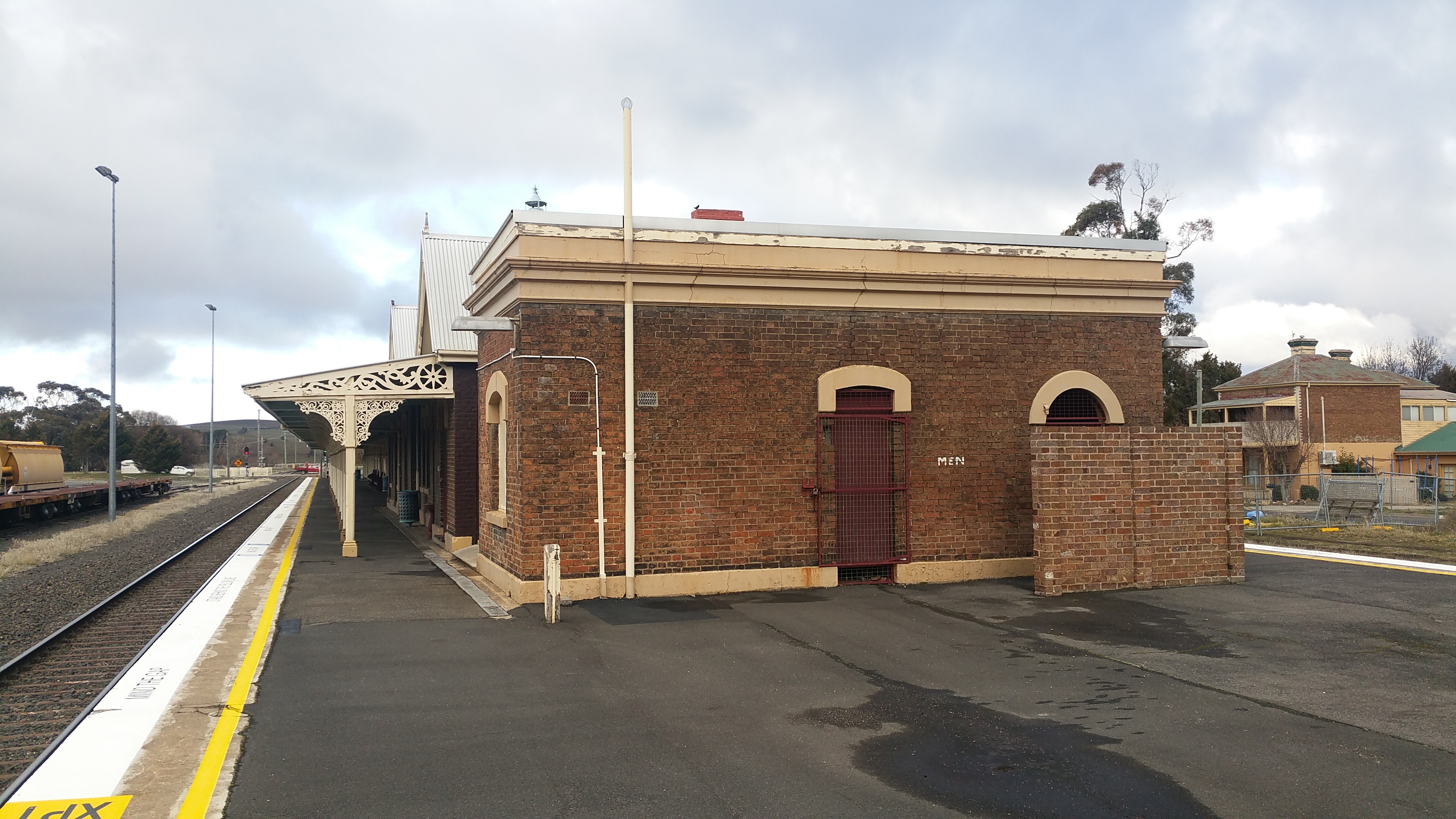
Southbound view on main platform

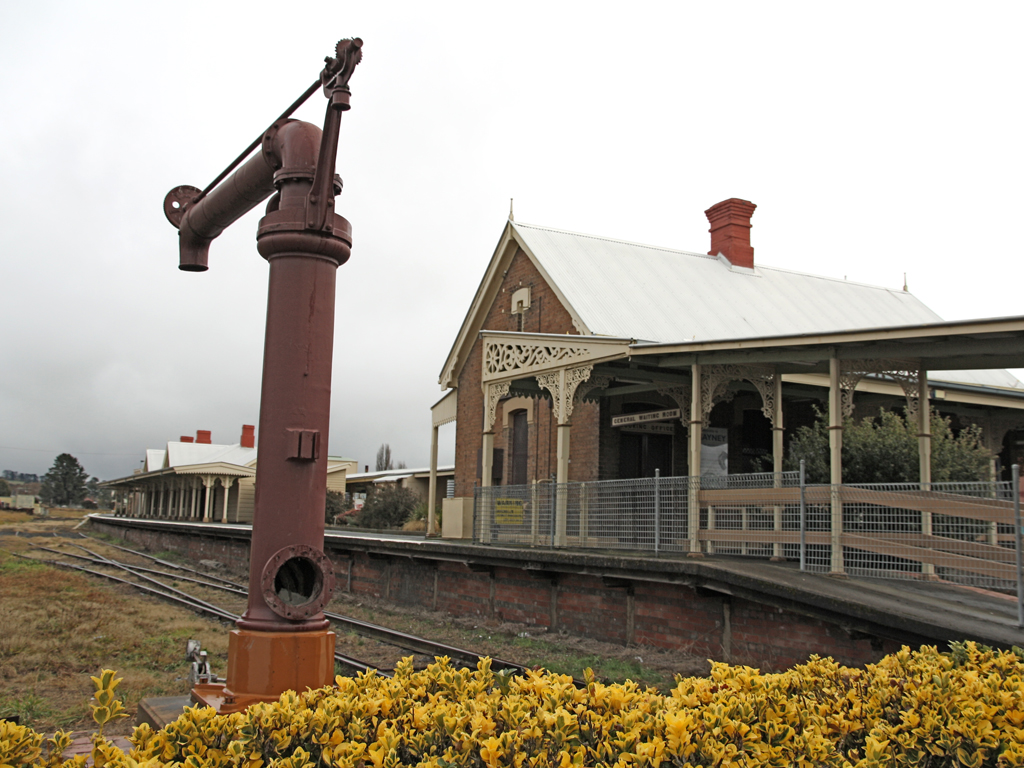
Disused Blayney–Demondrille line platform
in July 2010

== Description ==
The heritage-listed complex includes a type 1 brick station building and residence dating from 1876 and a type 2 brick station building in a non-standard style with timber posts and gables, dating from 1889. The stone platform faces date from 1876 and 1889 respectively. An awning connects all buildings, supported on timber posts with decorative cast iron brackets. The former railway refreshment room dates from 1889, and other station buildings date from 1890, 1901 and 1902. The former station residence (35 Ogilvy St) and the brick platform booking office are also included within the heritage listing.

== Heritage listing ==
The station complex is a major building in Blayney with an imposing position when viewed from the level crossing when approaching on the Bathurst road. The quality of the station buildings reflects the importance of the location as a junction station. The original station building is one of 5 similar structures remaining from 1888, the 1889 addition was designed to complement the original structure. The location of the separate booking office is unique and of high significance. The group is in good condition, intact, visually coherent, important to the townscape and streetscape of Blayney. The site clearly demonstrates the stages of development of the complex and the fine civic quality of structures from this period.

Blayney railway station was listed on the New South Wales State Heritage Register on 2 April 1999 having satisfied the following criteria.

The place possesses uncommon, rare or endangered aspects of the cultural or natural history of New South Wales.

This item is assessed as historically rare. This item is assessed as scientifically rare. This item is assessed as arch. rare. This item is assessed as socially rare.
