= Blayney Uniting Church =

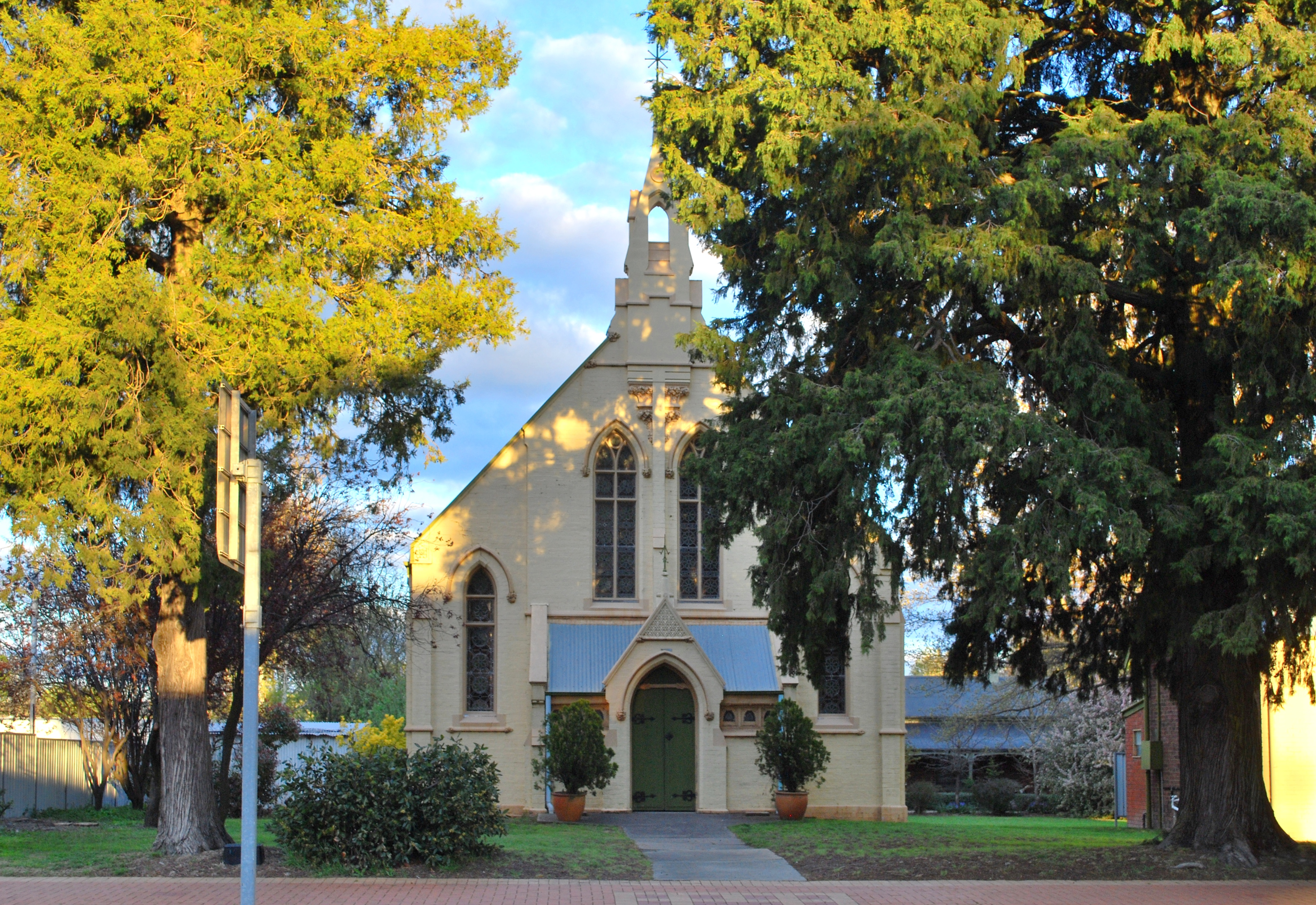
- Blayney Uniting Church, pictured in 2011

- Location in New South Wales
- 33°31′49″S 149°15′22″E
- Location: Adelaide Street, Blayney, Blayney Shire, New South Wales
- Country: Australia
- Denomination: Uniting
- Previous denomination: Methodist
- Website: blayney.uca.org.au

History
- Status: Church

Architecture
- Functional status: Active
- Architect: James Hine
- Architectural type: Victorian Carpenter Gothic
- Years built: 1885–1886
- Completed: 5 September 1886
- Construction cost: A£1,144

Administration
- Parish: Blayney

New South Wales Heritage Register
- Official name: Blayney Uniting Church & Hall
- Type: State heritage (complex / group)
- Designated: 2 April 1999
- Reference no.: 456
- Type: Church
- Category: Religion
- Builders: James Atkins

Blayney Uniting Church is a heritage-listed Uniting church at Adelaide Street, Blayney, Blayney Shire, New South Wales, Australia. The property is owned by the Uniting Church in Australia. It was added to the New South Wales State Heritage Register on 2 April 1999.

== History ==
The first Methodist church in Blayney, then known as King's Plains, was a temporary church erected in 1843. It was under the charge of the minister at Bathurst until 1859, when the circuit was divided. The temporary church was replaced after nineteen years and is no longer extant.

The second Methodist church, now the church hall and Sunday school, was a brick church that opened in 1862 for £300. It was extended in 1912 and 1928.

The current church was built from 1885-86 at a cost of approximately £1,144 by Bathurst contractor James Atkins. The church, designed in the Victorian Carpenter Gothic style by architect James Hine, opened on 5 September 1886. It was renovated c. 1940, and celebrated its 125th anniversary in 2011.

The former parsonage was built in 1884.

It became the Uniting Church in 1977 following the merger of the Methodist, Congregational and Presbyterian churches.

== Heritage listing ==
Blayney Uniting Church was listed on the New South Wales State Heritage Register on 2 April 1999.

== See also ==
- List of Uniting churches in New South Wales
