= Blayney Wind Farm =

Wind farm in New South Wales, Australia

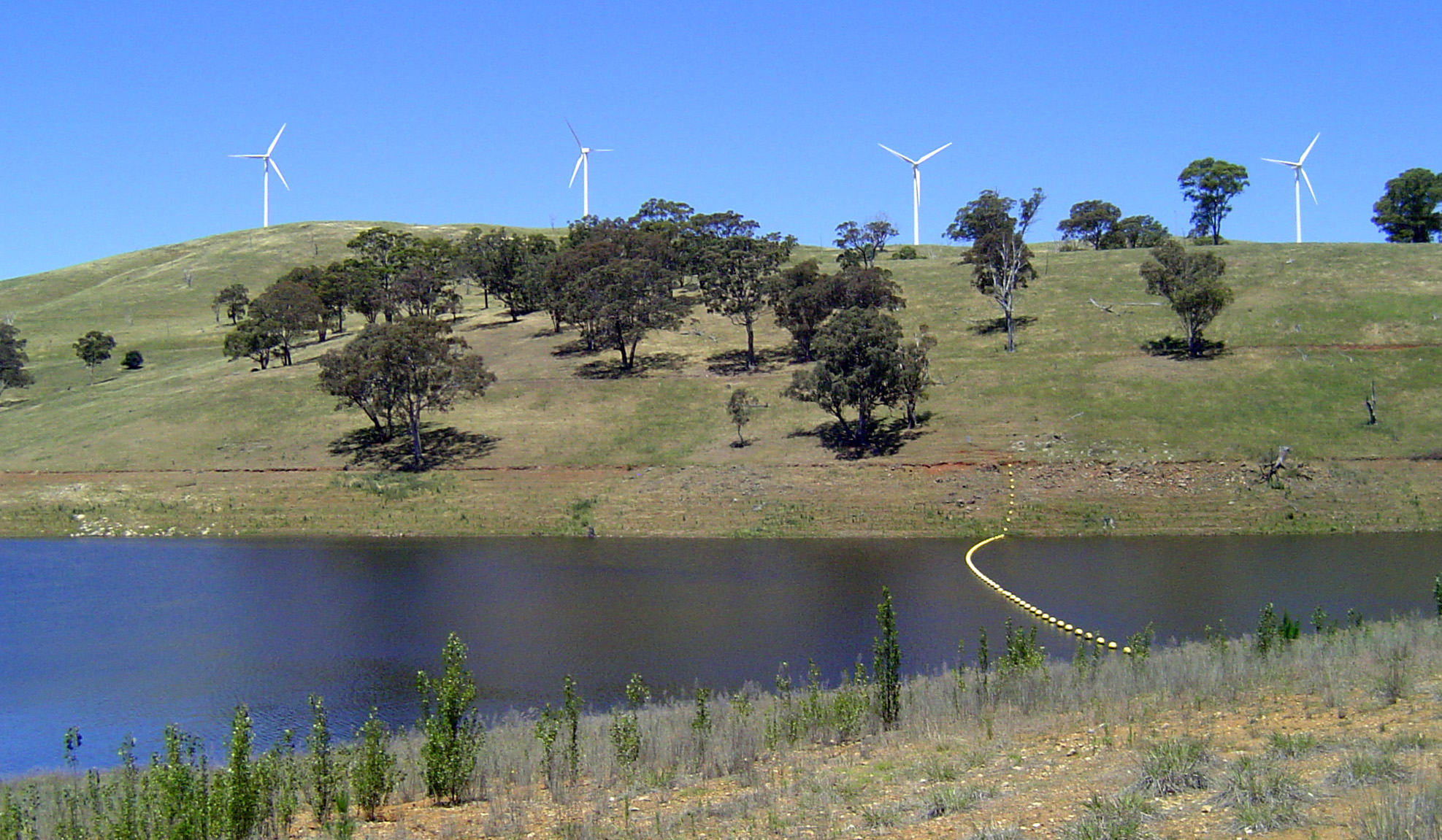
- Location of Blayney Wind Farm in New South Wales
- Country: Australia
- Location: Blayney, New South Wales
- Coordinates: 33°37′19″S 149°11′54″E
- Status: Operational
- Commission date: October 2000
- Construction cost: A$18 million
- Owner: Tilt Renewables

Wind farm
- Type: onshore
- Hub height: 45 m (148 ft)
- Rotor diameter: 47 m (154 ft)

Power generation
- Units operational: 15 X 660kW
- Make and model: Vestas: V47
- Nameplate capacity: 9.9 MW

External links
- Commons: Related media on Commons

The Blayney wind farm is a wind power station at Lake Carcoar, south of Blayney, New South Wales, Australia. It was acquired by Trustpower in 2014, and is now owned by Tilt Renewables. Blayney has fifteen wind turbines, with a total nameplate capacity of 9.9 MW of electricity.

== Technical information ==
Pacific Power International developed the wind farm, and Consolidated Power Projects Australia was the construction contractor. Project cost was A$18 million. The Minister for Energy, Kim Yeadon, opened the wind farm in October, 2000. The wind farm will avoid the emission of 400,000 tonnes of carbon dioxide over the 20 year life of the project, compared to the equivalent electricity generation from coal.

At the time of construction in 2000, Blayney was the largest wind farm in Australia, but has since been exceeded by several other Australian wind farms, and is fairly small by modern world standards as wind farm sizes grew rapidly through the 2000s. The wind turbines are Vestas V47-660 kW models, with 45 metres (148 ft) hub height and 47 metres (154 ft) rotor diameter. The wind farm stands above Lake Carcoar and the Carcoar dam, a popular recreational area. A public viewing area and interpretive centre is open to visitors.

The wind farm is on two properties whose families have grazed livestock for many years, and royalty payments to the landowners supplement their incomes. Livestock continue to graze the land up to the turbine tower bases. Pacific Power International conducted an environmental impact study before construction, to minimise impacts on human activities and wildlife.

The wind farm's output feeds the grid, and creates renewable energy credits.

== Gallery ==
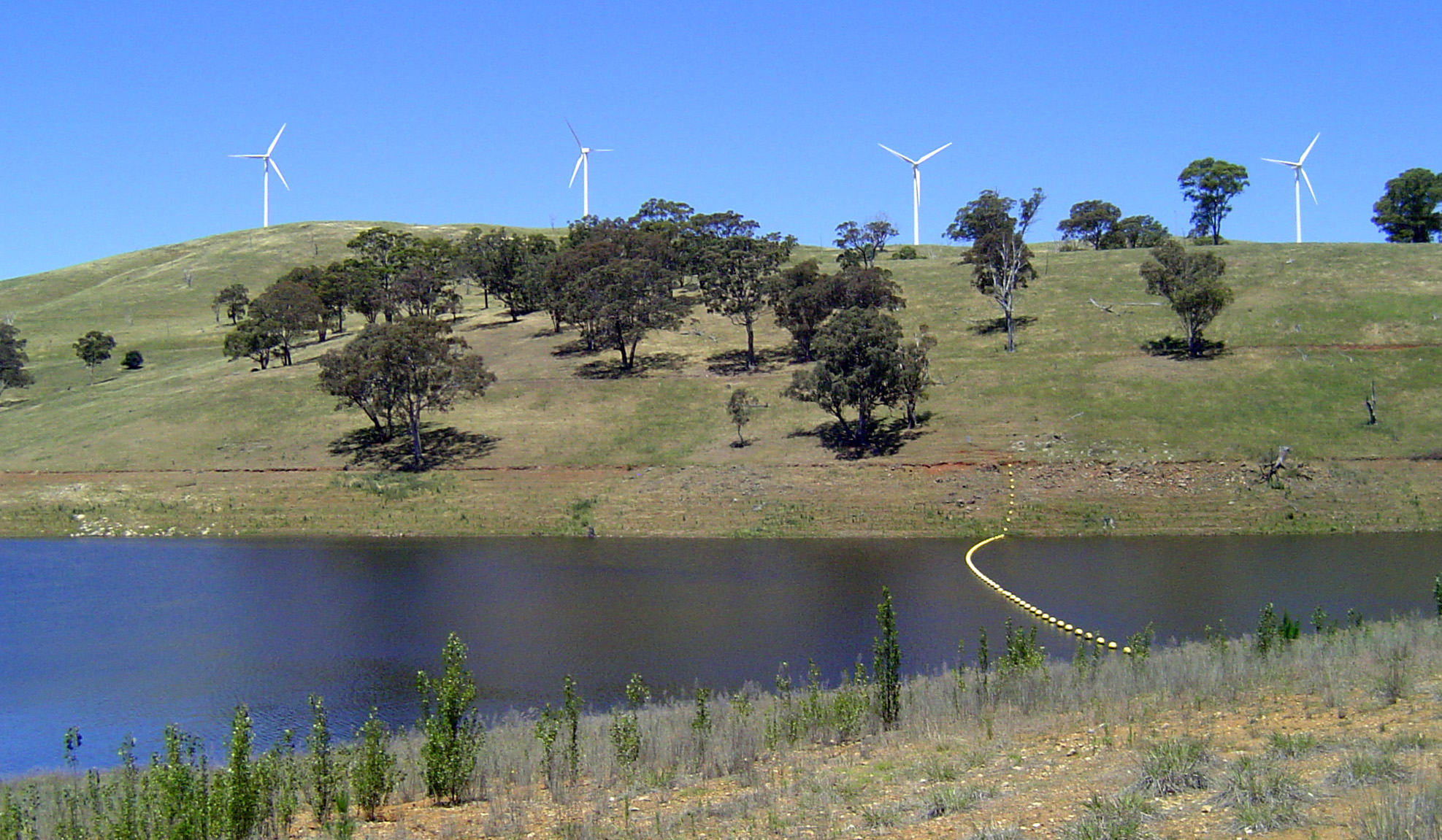
Blayney Wind Farm

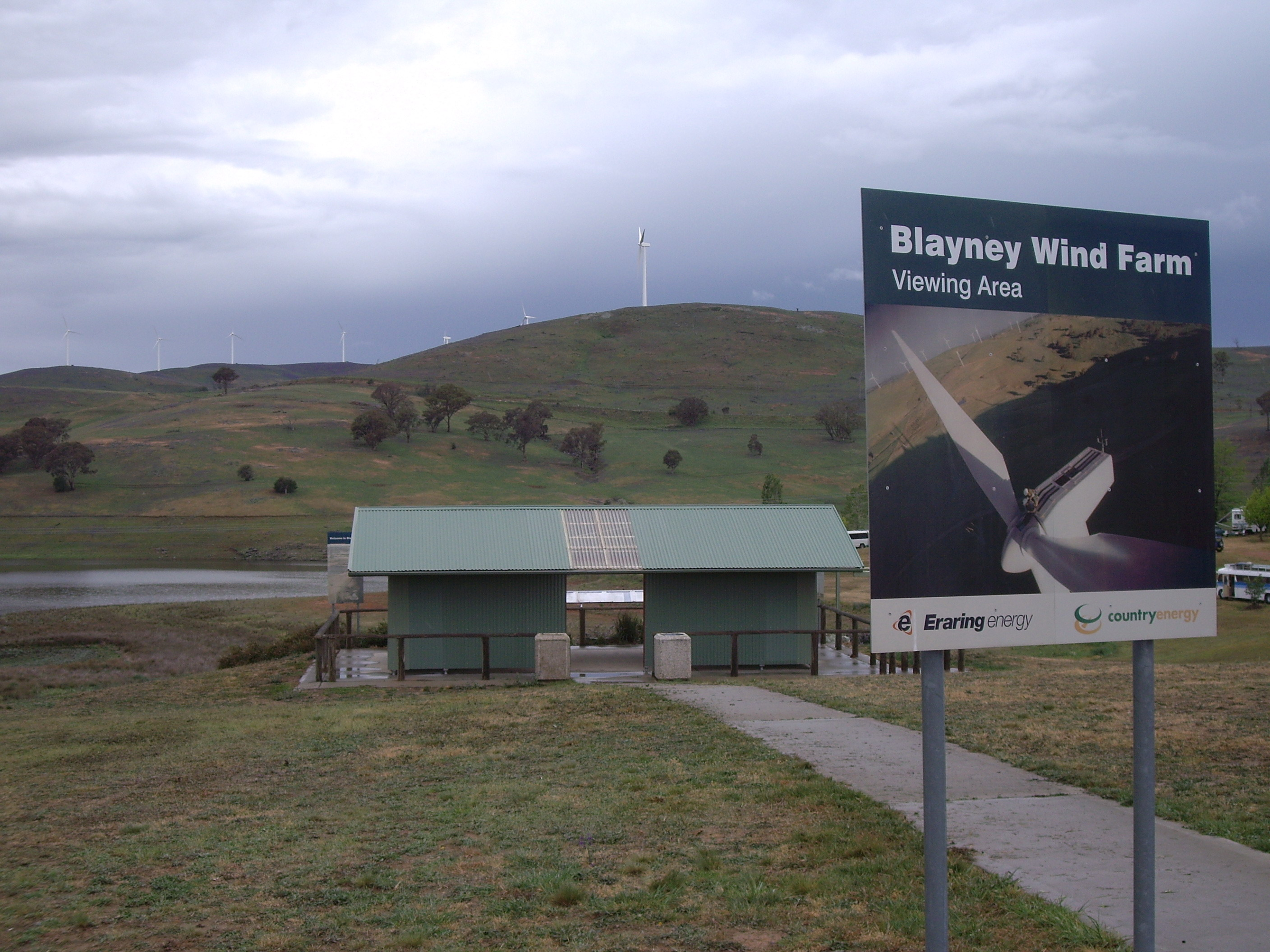
Viewing area

== See also ==
- List of wind farms in Australia
- Wind power in Australia
