= Millthorpe railway station =

Railway station in New South Wales, Australia

Millthorpe
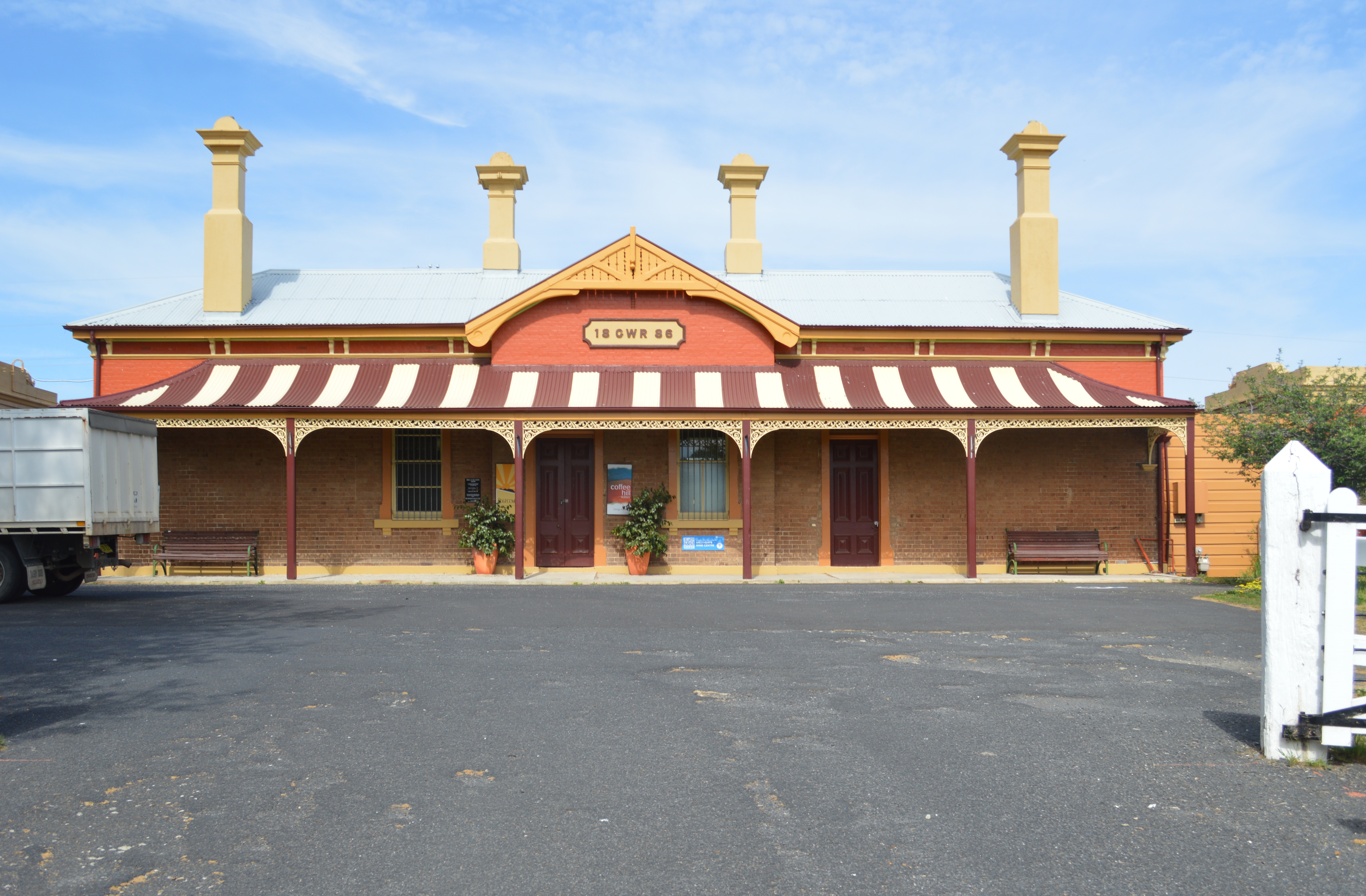
- Forecourt in October 2015

General information
- Location: Pym Street, Millthorpe; Australia
- Coordinates: 33°26′55″S 149°10′58″E
- Owner: Transport Asset Manager of New South Wales
- Operator: NSW TrainLink
- Line: Main Western
- Distance: 302.60 kilometres (188.03 mi) from Central
- Platforms: 1
- Tracks: 1

Construction
- Structure type: Ground

History
- Opened: 1877, 1886 & 2019
- Former names: Spring Grove

Services
Preceding station	NSW TrainLink	Following station
Orange towards Dubbo	NSW TrainLink Western Line Dubbo XPT	Blayney towards Sydney
Location

Millthorpe railway station is a heritage-listed railway station located on the Main Western line in Millthorpe, New South Wales, Australia.

== History ==
The original station opened on 19 April 1877 as Spring Grove when the line was extended from Blayney to Orange. It was renamed Millthorpe on 29 February 1884. It was located 500 metres east of the present station which opened in 1886.

The disused station building was being used as the Millthorpe Wine Centre, a cellar door outlet for two local vineyards, in 2016.

After many years out of use, in October 2017 Transport for NSW announced planning was underway to reopen the station as a request stop for the Central West XPT service operating between Sydney and Dubbo. Amongst the work required was for the track to be realigned to once again run up against the platform. Instead of realigning the track, a short platform extension was constructed. The station reopened on 15 March 2019.

== Description ==
The heritage-listed complex includes the type 2 brick station building, built in the sub-type 4 and the type 3 brick residence, both dating from 1886. The brick platform face and the station forecourt also fall within the heritage listing.

== Services ==
Millthorpe railway station is served by NSW TrainLink's daily Central West XPT service operating between Sydney and Dubbo. As this station is a request stop, the train stops only if passengers booked to board or alight here.

Platform	Line	Stopping pattern	Notes
1	Western Region	services to Sydney Central & Dubbo	request stop (booked passengers only)

== Heritage listing ==
Its location at the end of Pym Street closes the vista of the main street and gives it a prominence in the townscape of considerable significance. It is an important civic building in an historic town setting exhibiting fine proportion and detailing. Millthorpe station is one of four examples of this station type, the others being St Peters (1883), Riverstone (1887) and Spring Hill (1884) (demolished). It is the only intact surviving country example and is of high significance.

Millthorpe railway station was listed on the New South Wales State Heritage Register on 2 April 1999.
