= Millthorpe, New South Wales =

Millthorpe
- Town
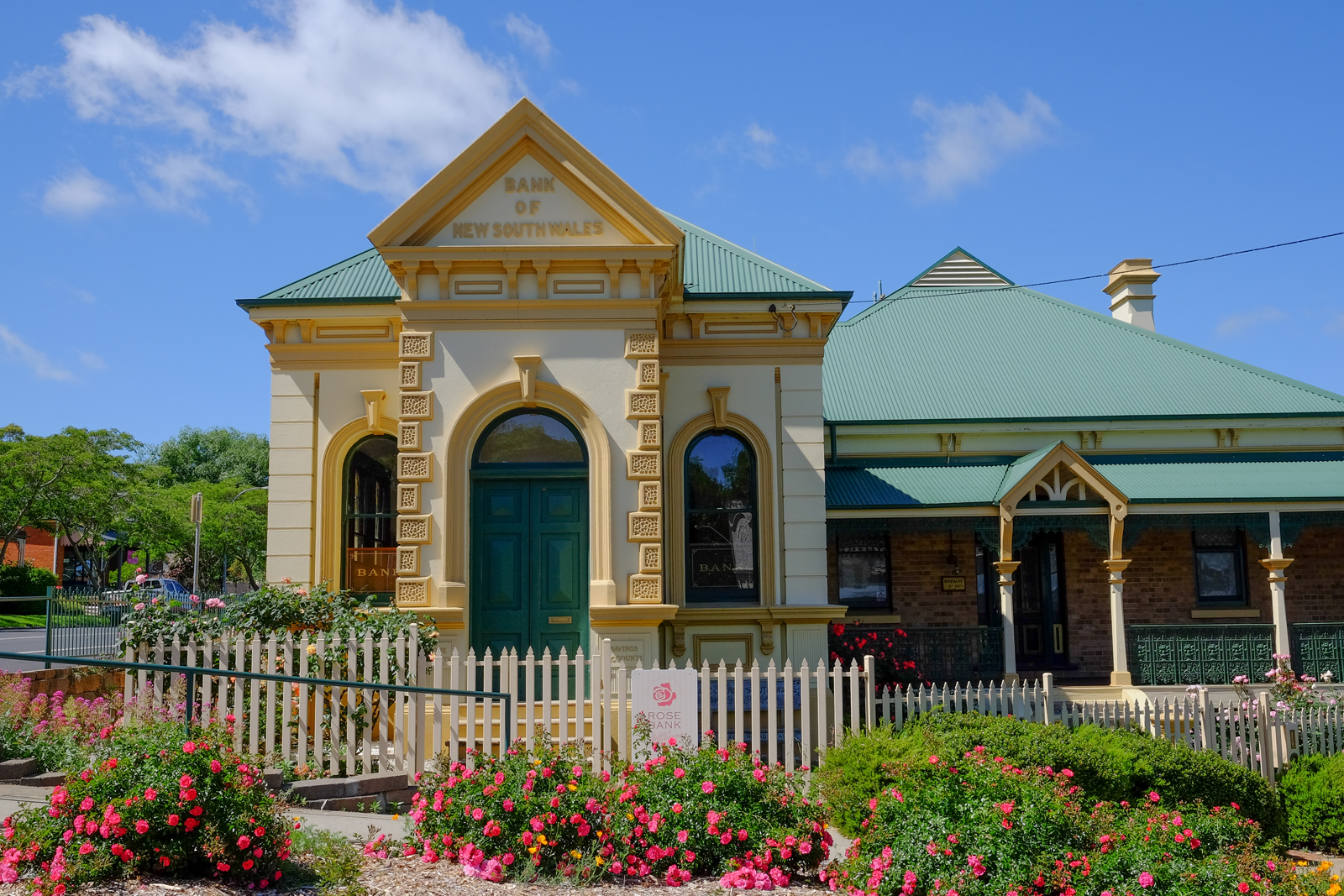
- Bank of New South Wales on High Street of Millthorpe

- Interactive map of Millthorpe
- Coordinates: 33°27′S 149°11′E
- Country: Australia
- State: New South Wales
- LGA: Blayney Shire
- Location: 252 km (157 mi) from Sydney; 22 km (14 mi) from Orange; 12 km (7.5 mi) from Blayney

Government
  - State electorate: Bathurst
  - Federal division: Calare
- Elevation: 960.0 m (3,149.6 ft)

Population
  - Total: 1,347 (2021 census)
- Postcode: 2798
- County: Bathurst County
- Mean max temp: 18.0 °C (64.4 °F)
- Mean min temp: 6.4 °C (43.5 °F)
- Annual rainfall: 806.2 mm (31.74 in)

Millthorpe is a town located between Orange and Blayney in New South Wales, Australia, in the Blayney Shire. At the 2021 census, Millthorpe had a population of 1,347. The town, originally called Spring Grove, was once a major potato growing area and continues to have extensive agricultural activities.

Millthorpe is a picturesque, compact and historic village set amidst gently rolling hills. Classified by the National Trust, it has a number of fine historic buildings, as well as cobbled, bluestone-bordered streets, art galleries, gift and antiques shops, a museum, two hotels, restaurants and cafes, a bowling club and motel. Two of the main streets, Victoria (which runs east-west) and Park (north-south), follow the contours of the local topography with a more regularised grid system extending outwards from them. Millthorpe is located 252 kilometres (157 mi) north-west of Sydney and 22 kilometres (14 mi) south of Orange.

== History ==
The town lies on the traditional lands of the Wiradjuri people. European settlement of the area began when a government stock station was established in 1823. The town is based upon a land grant originally known as Grove Farm which was made out to convict overseer Charles Booth in 1834. Noted explorer Thomas Mitchell twice stayed there during inland expeditions. The area developed as a farming centre from 1840 to 1880 with orchards established in the 1860s.

Local agriculture received a considerable boost from the arrival of the railway in the 1870s complete with a railway station. A large flour mill was established in 1882. Consequently, in 1884 the town's name was changed from Spring Grove to Millthorpe. Today it is still essentially a service centre to the rich farmlands which surround it.

Millthorpe's commercial area was extended after the depression of the 1890s and many of its largely brick buildings date from that period. The town's decline after World War I means that it was spared redevelopment and so many of its buildings have survived with very little alteration.

== Events ==
Lyndon Terracini, former artistic director of Opera Australia, who owns a property in the area, announced in 2024 that the inaugural Handa Opera at Millthorpe festival will be held in 2025.

== Heritage listings ==
Millthorpe has a number of heritage-listed sites, including:

- Main Western railway: Millthorpe railway station
- 27 Victoria Street: Grand Western Lodge

== Notable Millthorpians ==
- Ellen Esther Dawson (1895–1961), wife of Arthur Stace. Known as Pearl, she was brought up in Millthorpe, later moving to Sydney to work as a domestic servant for a medical practitioner. She married Stace in 1942.
- Bluey Wilkinson (1911–1940), born in Millthorpe; international speedway rider, 1938 World Champion and 3 time Australian Champion
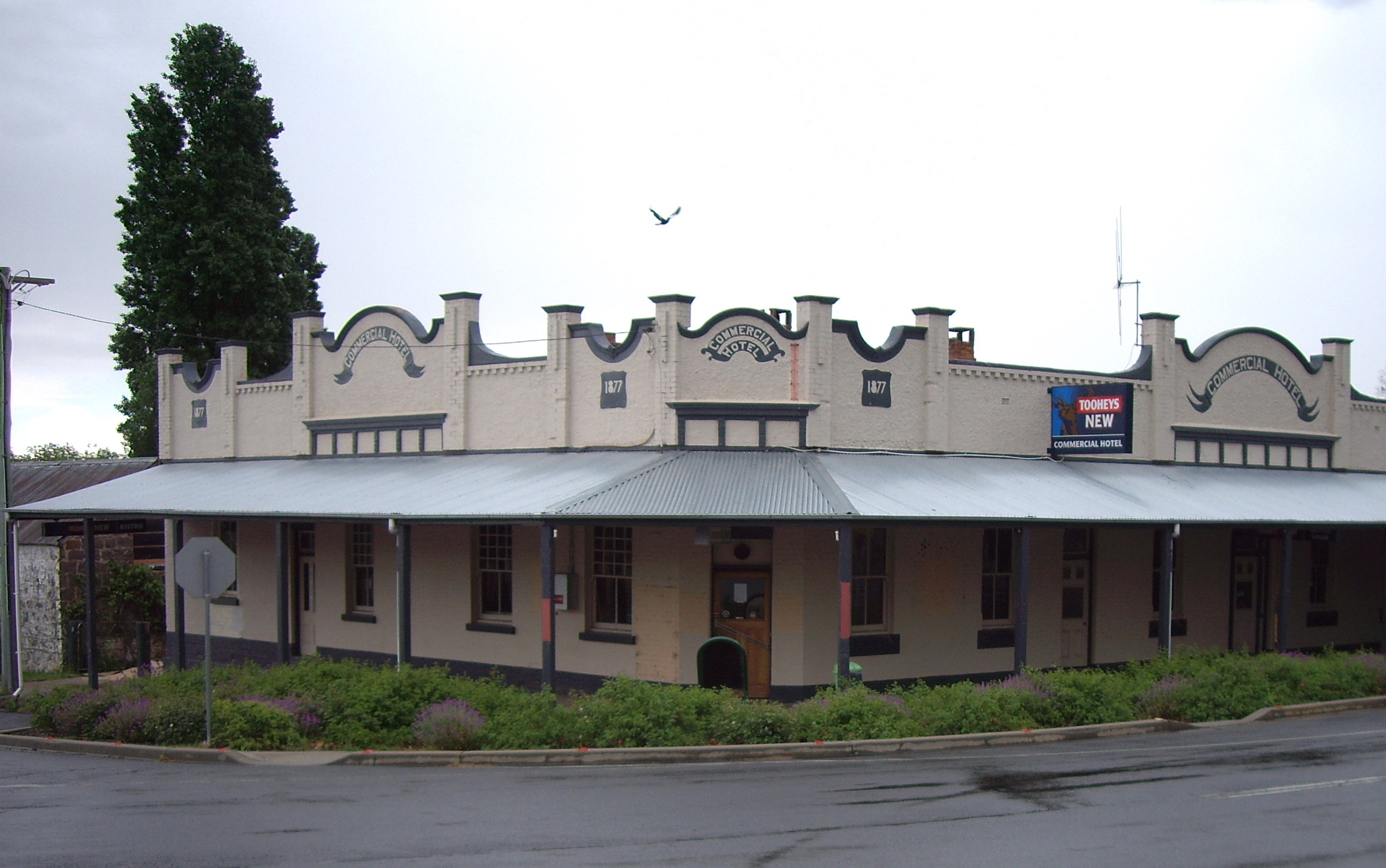
Commercial Hotel

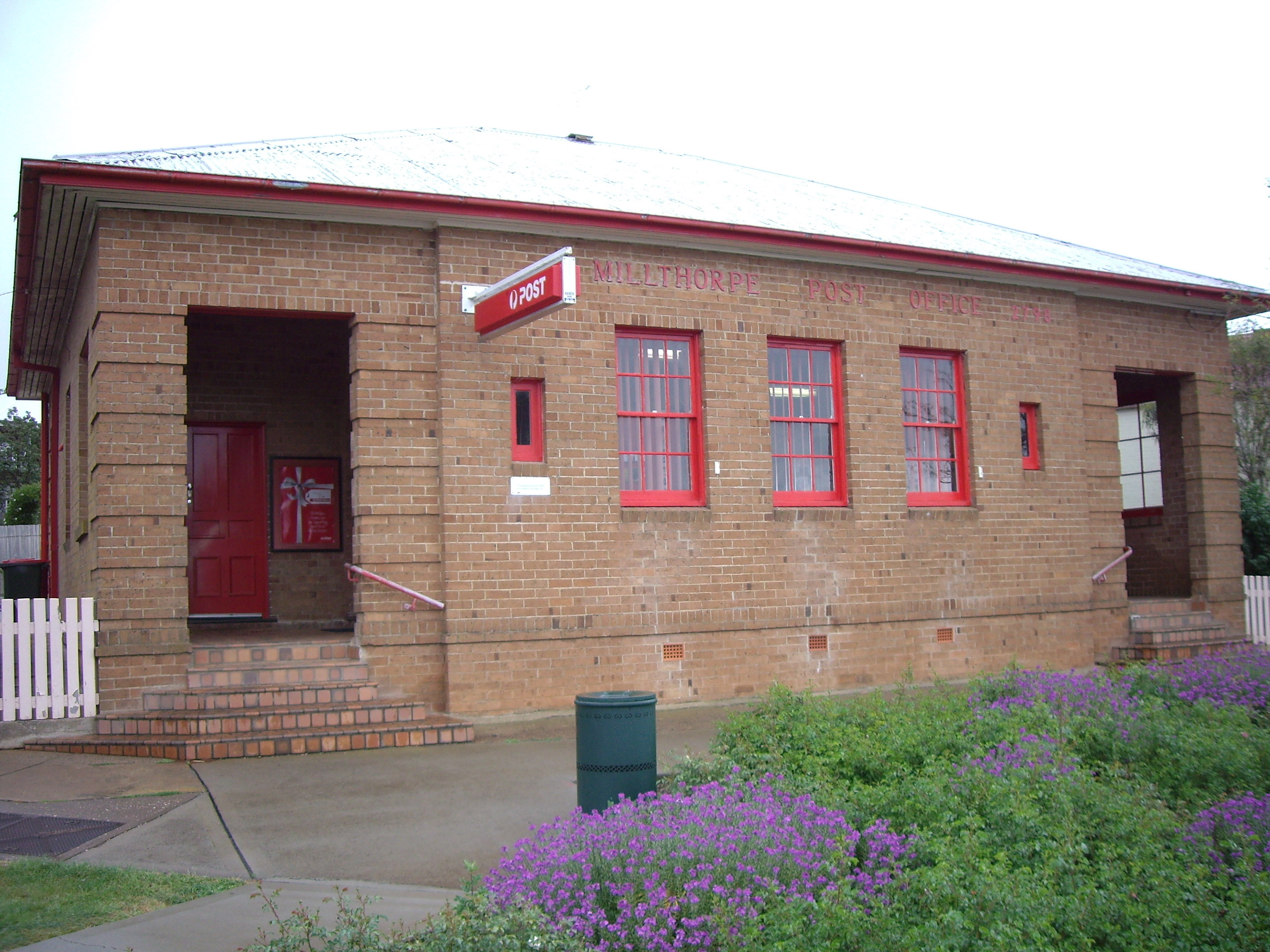
Post office

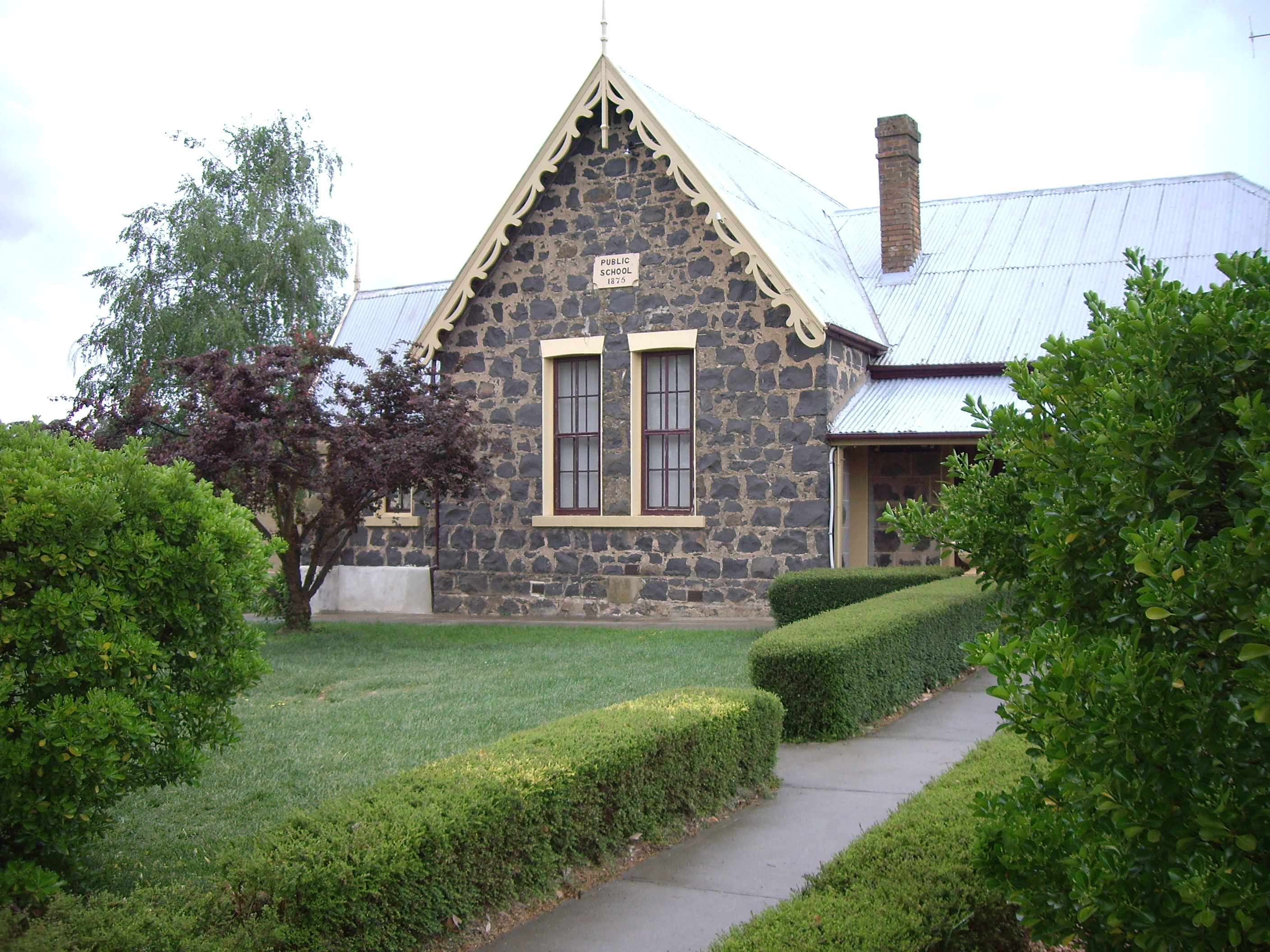
Public school

== Climate ==
Millthorpe has warm summers prone to thunderstorms and cold, wet winters with light to moderate snowfalls. Its great seasonal range approaches that of climates much further south, due to its far western location compared to other areas on the Central Tablelands.

Climate data for Millthorpe (Inala, 1899–2005); 960 m AMSL; 33.45° S, 149.18° E
Month	Jan	Feb	Mar	Apr	May	Jun	Jul	Aug	Sep	Oct	Nov	Dec	Year
Mean daily maximum °C (°F)	26.6 (79.9)	25.9 (78.6)	23.2 (73.8)	18.7 (65.7)	13.5 (56.3)	9.8 (49.6)	8.8 (47.8)	10.4 (50.7)	14.1 (57.4)	18.1 (64.6)	21.6 (70.9)	24.9 (76.8)	18.0 (64.3)
Mean daily minimum °C (°F)	11.7 (53.1)	11.9 (53.4)	10.0 (50.0)	6.7 (44.1)	4.3 (39.7)	2.0 (35.6)	1.1 (34.0)	1.7 (35.1)	3.6 (38.5)	5.9 (42.6)	7.9 (46.2)	10.2 (50.4)	6.4 (43.6)
Average precipitation mm (inches)	71.2 (2.80)	61.5 (2.42)	55.4 (2.18)	52.9 (2.08)	59.9 (2.36)	72.7 (2.86)	75.9 (2.99)	79.4 (3.13)	66.1 (2.60)	78.0 (3.07)	64.5 (2.54)	67.3 (2.65)	806.2 (31.74)
Average precipitation days (≥ 0.2 mm)	6.7	5.9	5.8	6.1	9.1	10.7	11.7	11.2	9.7	9.1	7.7	6.9	100.6
Source: Australian Bureau of Meteorology; Millthorpe (Inala)
