= Blayney, New South Wales =

Blayney
- Town
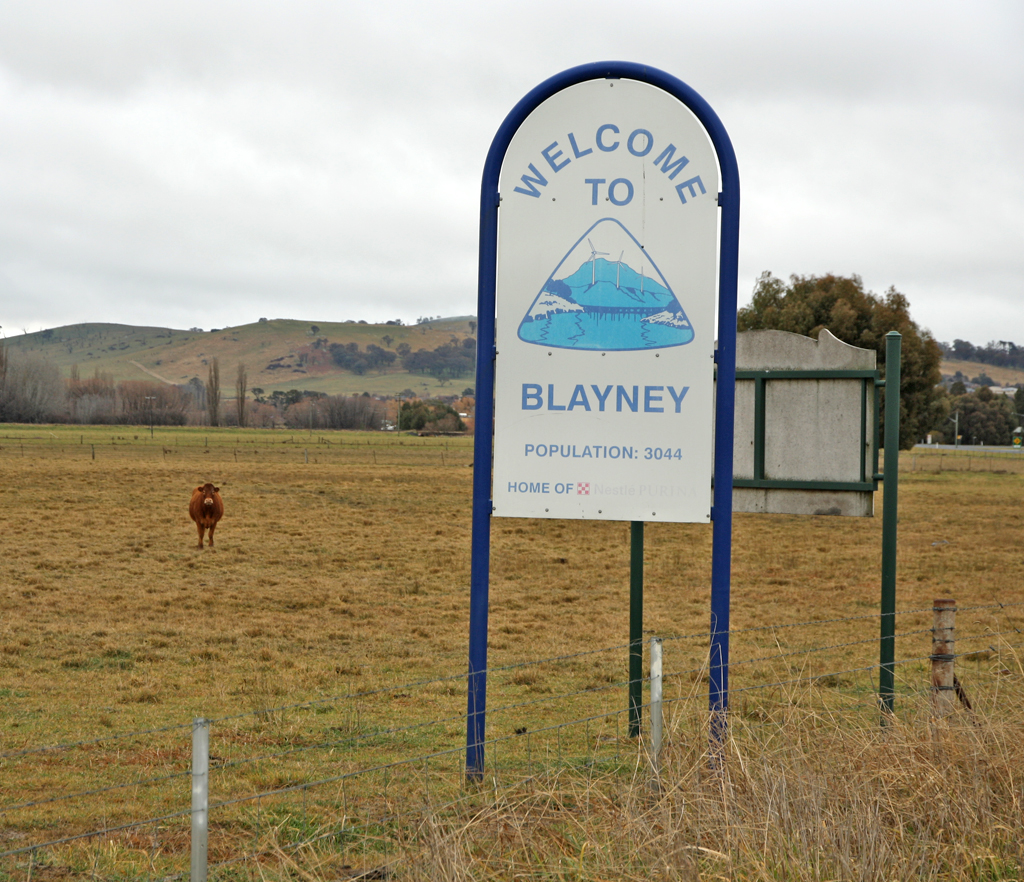
- Town Entry Sign on Mid Western Highway

- Coordinates: 33°32′0″S 149°15′0″E
- Country: Australia
- State: New South Wales
- LGA: Blayney Shire
- Location: 240 km (150 mi) from Sydney; 35 km (22 mi) from Orange

Government
  - State electorate: Bathurst
  - Federal division: Calare
- Elevation: 863.0 m (2,831.4 ft)

Population
  - Total: 2,997 (2021 census)
- Postcode: 2799
- Mean max temp: 18.3 °C (64.9 °F)
- Mean min temp: 4.4 °C (39.9 °F)
- Annual rainfall: 765.9 mm (30.15 in)

Blayney is a farming town and administrative centre with a population of 2,997 in 2021, in the Central West region of New South Wales, Australia. Situated on the Mid-Western Highway about 240 km (150 mi) west of Sydney, 35 km (22 mi) west of Bathurst and 863 m (2,831 ft) above sea-level, Blayney is the seat of Blayney Shire Council.

== History ==
Prior to European settlement the area was occupied by the Aboriginal Wiradjuri and, or, Gundungara peoples.

The first European to travel through area was surveyor George Evans, in 1815 and unofficial occupation of the district began in 1821. The first land grant in the general area known as Coombing Park was issued to Thomas Icely in 1829.

In 1836 the locality was known as King's Plains, with Doyle's inn being the only public-house. There was also a mill worked by a man called Lambert.

In 1842 Governor Gipps proposed the creation of a village to be named 'Blayney'. His proposed site, however, was about 9 km north-east of the present site in the Kings Plains area, but once that spot proved unsuitable the Blayney village location was established on its present site in 1843.

A train line used to run from Blayney to the Lime Kilns, transporting lime. This is situated on land adjoining the Blayney Cemetery and is heritage listed. Remnants of the lime kilns can still be seen today.

Historical population
Year	Pop.	±%
1921	1,345	—
1933	1,588	+18.1%
1947		—
1954	1,688	—
1961	1,852	+9.7%
1966	1,909	+3.1%
1971	2,614	+36.9%
1976	2,535	−3.0%
1981	2,694	+6.3%
1986	2,593	−3.7%
1991	2,652	+2.3%
1996	2,672	+0.8%
2001	2,608	−2.4%
2006	2,745	+5.3%
2011	2,810	+2.4%
2016	2,963	+5.4%
2021	2,997	+1.1%
Source: Australian Bureau of Statistics data.

== Heritage listings ==
Blayney has a number of heritage-listed sites, including:

- Adelaide Street: Blayney Uniting Church
- Main Western railway: Blayney railway station

== Facilities and services ==
Blayney has three hotels: The Exchange, the Royal, and Tattersalls, all in Adelaide Street. A fourth, the Club House, has been converted to a Baptist church. There are six churches in all, the other five being Catholic, Uniting, Anglican, Presbyterian and Pentecostal.

There are three service stations, one offering unmanned 24-hour service for credit card purchases, one supermarket (Bernardi's Marketplace/Discount Daves), and various retail shops. A multi-purpose Community Centre with a large auditorium and a commercial standard kitchen is adjacent to the Council Chambers, and council also operate an aquatic centre with a large indoor swimming pool and other exercise facilities, and a public library. There are State Government run primary and high schools, with pupils arriving by school bus from surrounding rural areas, and a Catholic run primary school. The hospital offers emergency and medical care and limited surgical services, with more serious cases being transferred to Orange Base Hospital.

There is a 24-hour public toilet in Adelaide Street (the Mid-Western Highway) just before leaving the town heading west.

== Industry ==
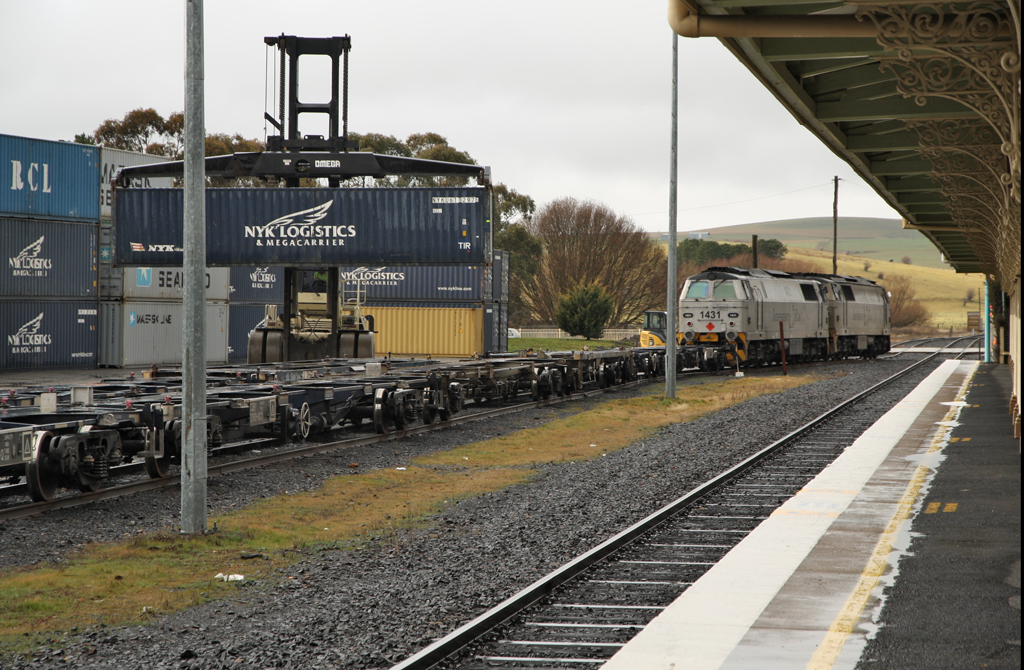
Container Terminal at Blayney station

The arrival of the railway in 1874 boosted development and Blayney replaced Carcoar as the major service centre to local farmlands. Blayney then became a municipality in 1882 and by 1900 a butter factory and freezing works employed many within the town. An abattoir opened in 1957 and this industry was later supplemented with tanneries and a pet food plant. The abattoirs closed in 1999.

In the late 1970s or early '80s a meat canning factory was built on farmland land east of Blayney. This produced Spam and other canned meats. This was later turned into an export meat boning facility run by Ron Jones Exports and then a pet food factory. Prior to this, the dam on the land was famous for yabbies, with Sunday school excursions frequenting there.

In 1989, Nestlé built a new pet food plant, Nestlé Purina, and purchased adjoining land including Blayney Foods. The Nestlé factory exports pet food to Asia and the Pacific.

The Cadia-Ridgeway Mine is a major employer in the area.

In 1994, Blayney became home to Australia's largest inland container terminal, which is situated beside the railway station.

The Blayney Wind Farm, launched in 2000, was the largest of its type in Australia at the time of construction. It consists of 15 wind turbine generators on elevated ridges between Carcoar Dam and Mount Macquarie. The generation capacity is 10 megawatts, which is sufficient energy to supply 3,500 Australian homes.

== Climate ==
Due to its valley location, Blayney shows a greater diurnal range but narrower seasonal range throughout the year compared to nearby Millthorpe which is more exposed. On account of this geographical setup (jointly with its altitude), Blayney's absolute minimum of −10.6 °C (12.9 °F) is among the lowest recorded in the Central West region, even with a very limited ten years of record (from 1965 to 1975). Summers are warm and somewhat dry, though with severe thunderstorms, while winters are cool and partly cloudy with a few occurrences of snow each year.

Climate data for Blayney Post Office (1965–1975, rainfall 1885–1992); 863 m AMSL; 33.54° S, 149.26° E
Month	Jan	Feb	Mar	Apr	May	Jun	Jul	Aug	Sep	Oct	Nov	Dec	Year
Record high °C (°F)	37.5 (99.5)	35.6 (96.1)	35.0 (95.0)	26.7 (80.1)	24.9 (76.8)	18.3 (64.9)	18.5 (65.3)	21.3 (70.3)	27.8 (82.0)	29.5 (85.1)	31.2 (88.2)	36.1 (97.0)	37.5 (99.5)
Mean daily maximum °C (°F)	26.2 (79.2)	25.4 (77.7)	23.4 (74.1)	19.2 (66.6)	14.3 (57.7)	11.5 (52.7)	10.3 (50.5)	11.2 (52.2)	14.6 (58.3)	18.1 (64.6)	20.7 (69.3)	24.4 (75.9)	18.3 (64.9)
Mean daily minimum °C (°F)	10.6 (51.1)	10.8 (51.4)	8.1 (46.6)	4.0 (39.2)	1.1 (34.0)	−0.5 (31.1)	−1.1 (30.0)	0.3 (32.5)	1.6 (34.9)	4.6 (40.3)	5.6 (42.1)	8.2 (46.8)	4.4 (40.0)
Record low °C (°F)	0.0 (32.0)	1.7 (35.1)	−5.5 (22.1)	−5.1 (22.8)	−9.4 (15.1)	−9.1 (15.6)	−10.6 (12.9)	−8.9 (16.0)	−6.2 (20.8)	−5.6 (21.9)	−2.5 (27.5)	−1.1 (30.0)	−10.6 (12.9)
Average precipitation mm (inches)	70.8 (2.79)	55.6 (2.19)	52.7 (2.07)	49.7 (1.96)	56.1 (2.21)	71.8 (2.83)	73.5 (2.89)	76.7 (3.02)	63.9 (2.52)	70.8 (2.79)	59.8 (2.35)	63.7 (2.51)	765.5 (30.14)
Average precipitation days (≥ 0.2 mm)	6.3	5.4	5.3	5.7	8.0	9.9	10.4	10.2	8.6	8.2	6.6	6.4	91.0

== Transportation ==
The town's railway station is served by the daily NSW TrainLink XPT service between Sydney and Dubbo and the weekly Outback Xplorer to Broken Hill, as well as several NSW TrainLink Coach and private company bus services connecting with Bathurst and Orange.

== Notable citizens ==
- Nathan Burns, professional football player with A-League club Wellington Phoenix and the Australian national team.
- Frank Cooper, Premier of Queensland from 1942 to 1946.
- Liam Henry, rugby league player for the Penrith Panthers.
- Peter McCann, Australian rules footballer
- Peter Toohey, Australian Test cricketer of the late 1970s

== Gallery ==
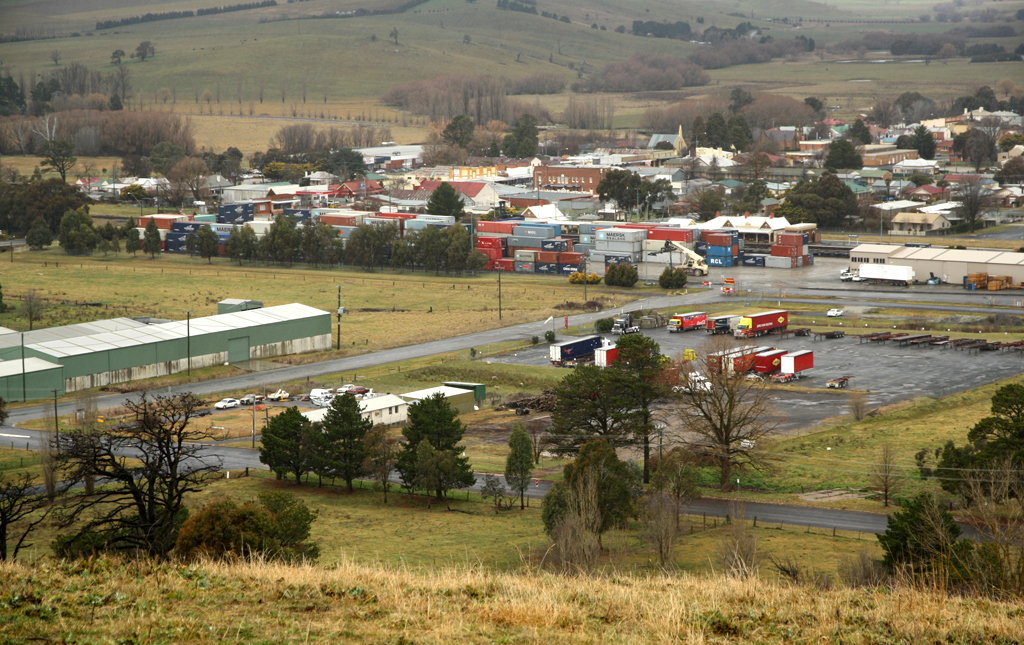
Blayney Valley view from the north

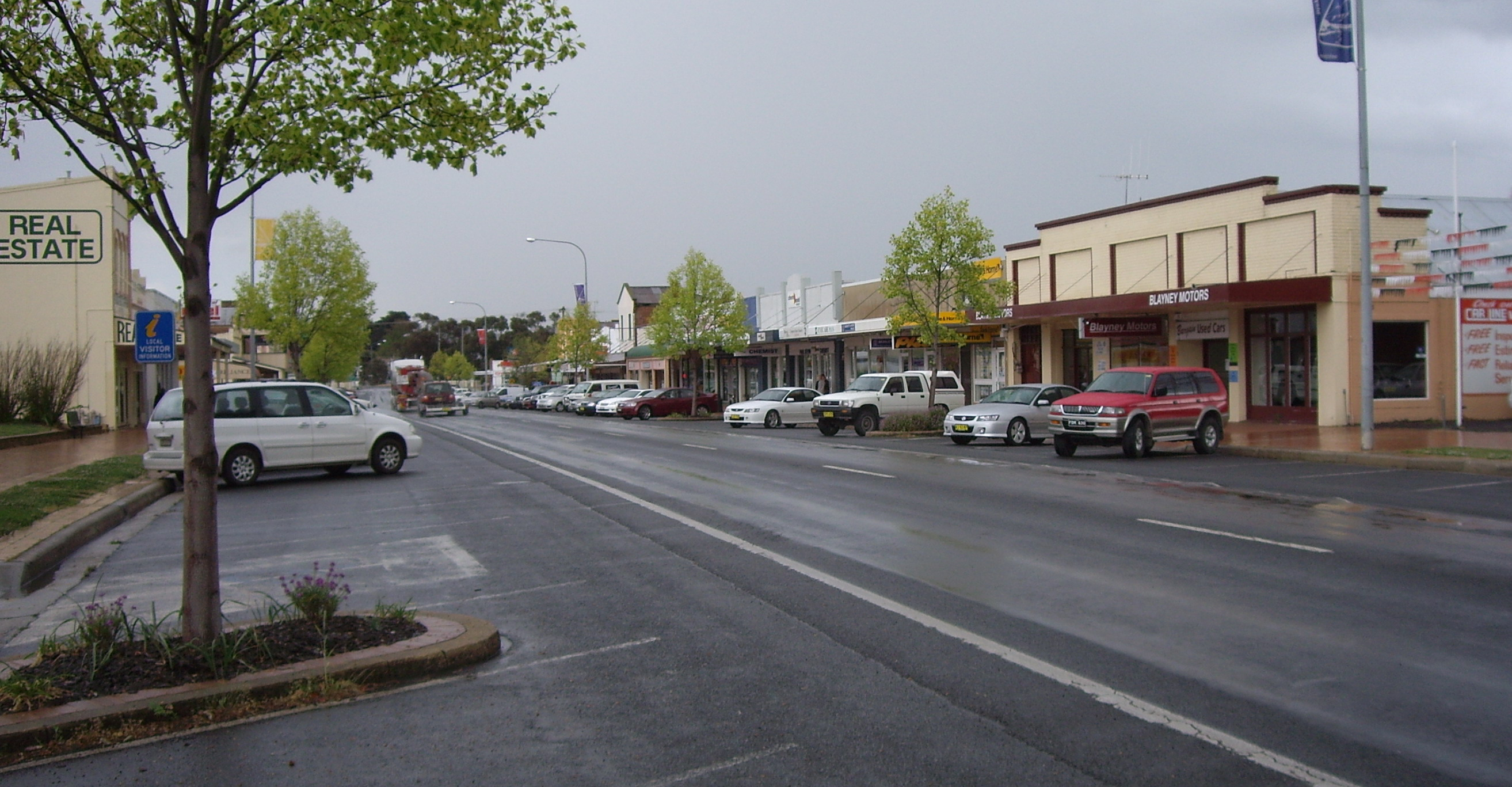
Adelaide Street, 2007

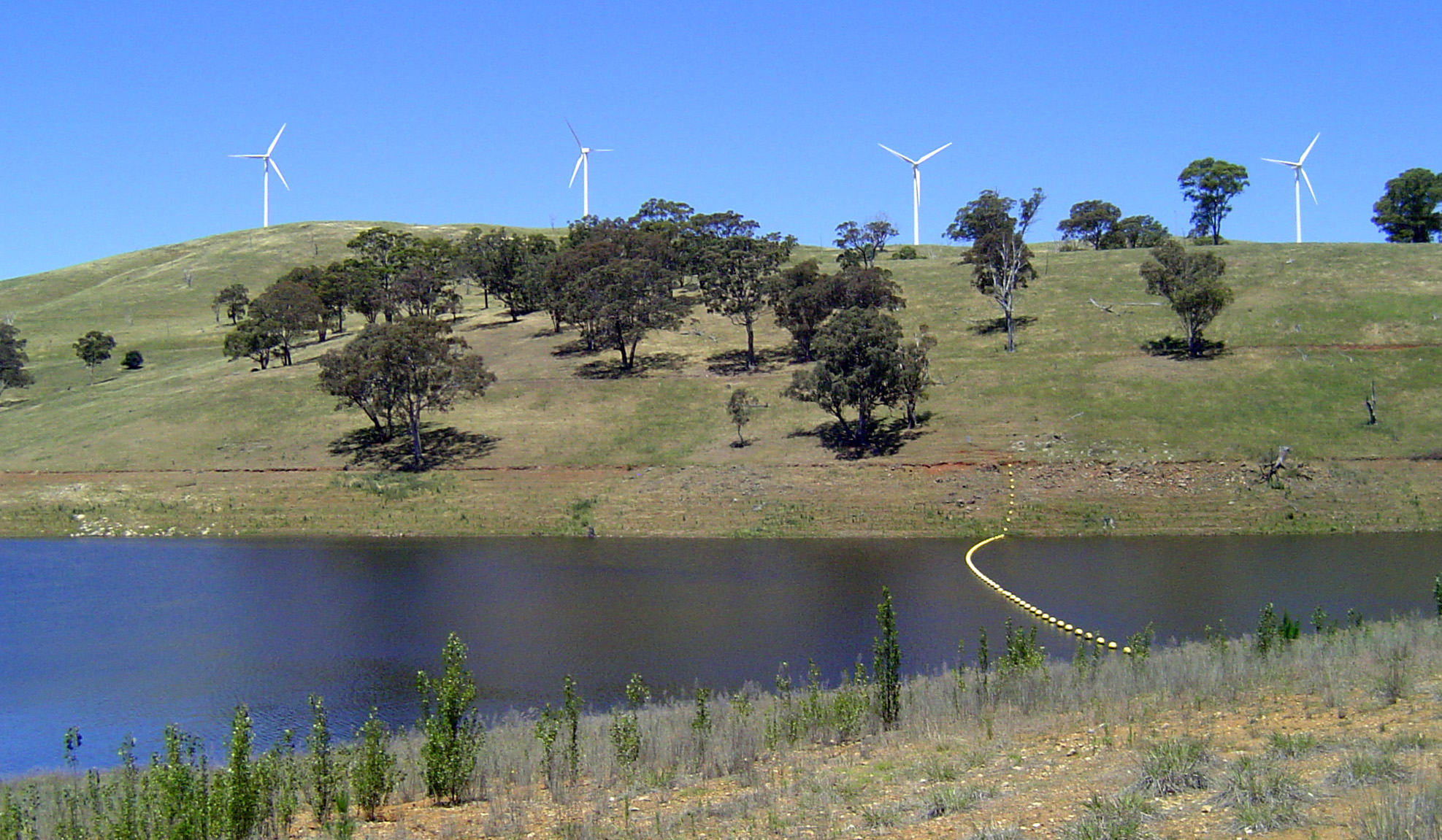
Blayney Wind Farm

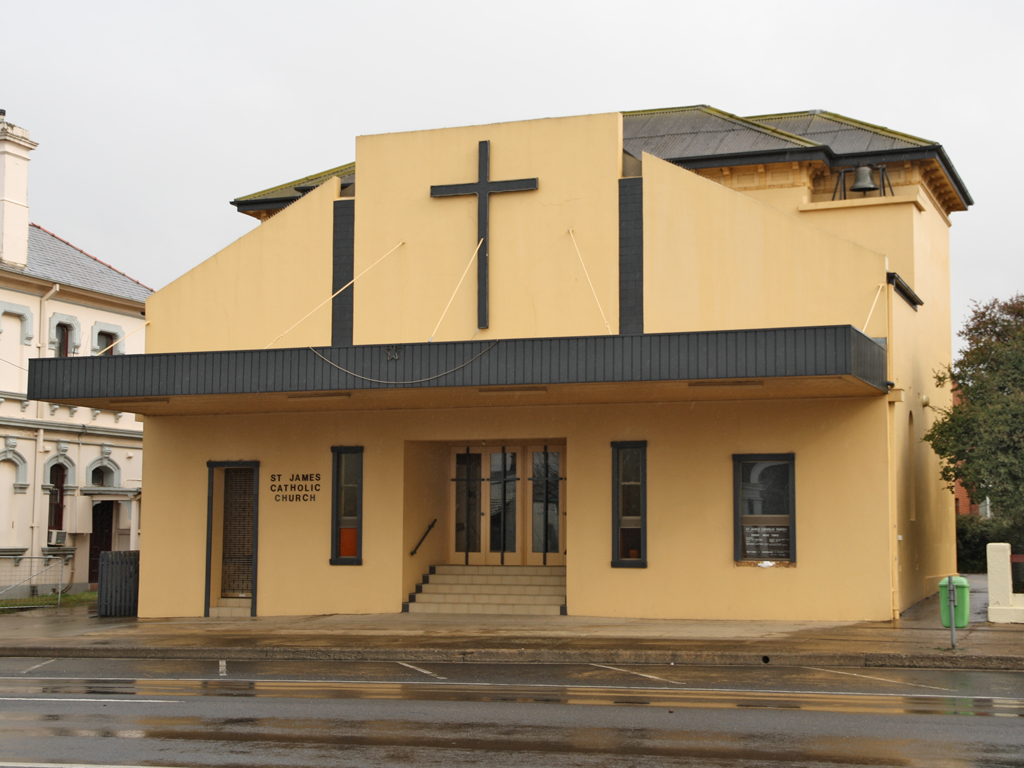
St James Roman Catholic Church

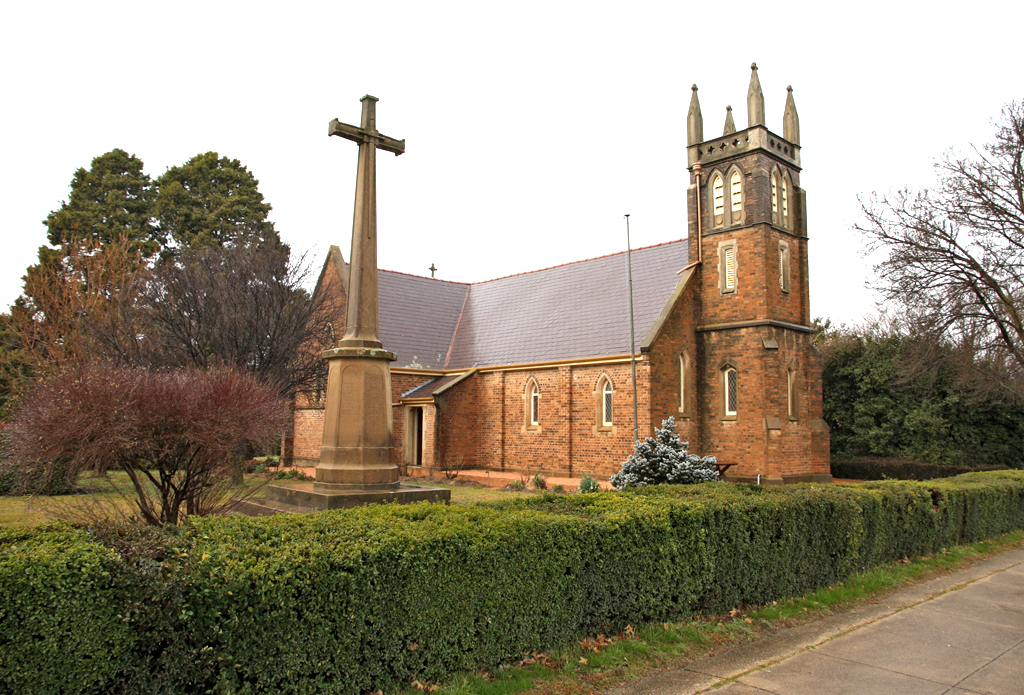
Christ Church Anglican

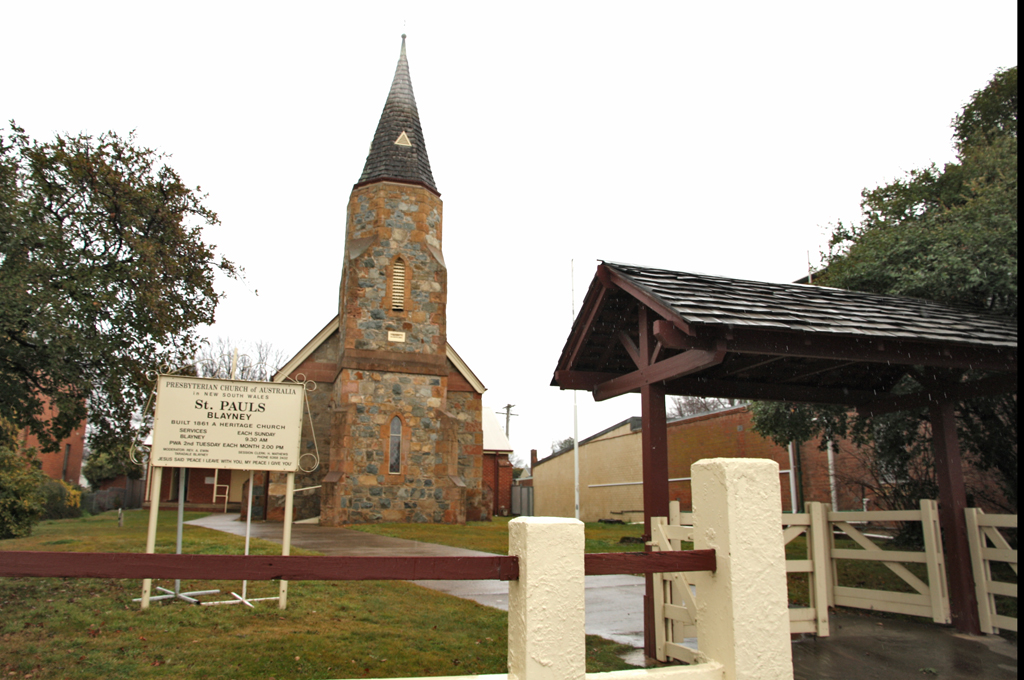
Saint Paul's Church

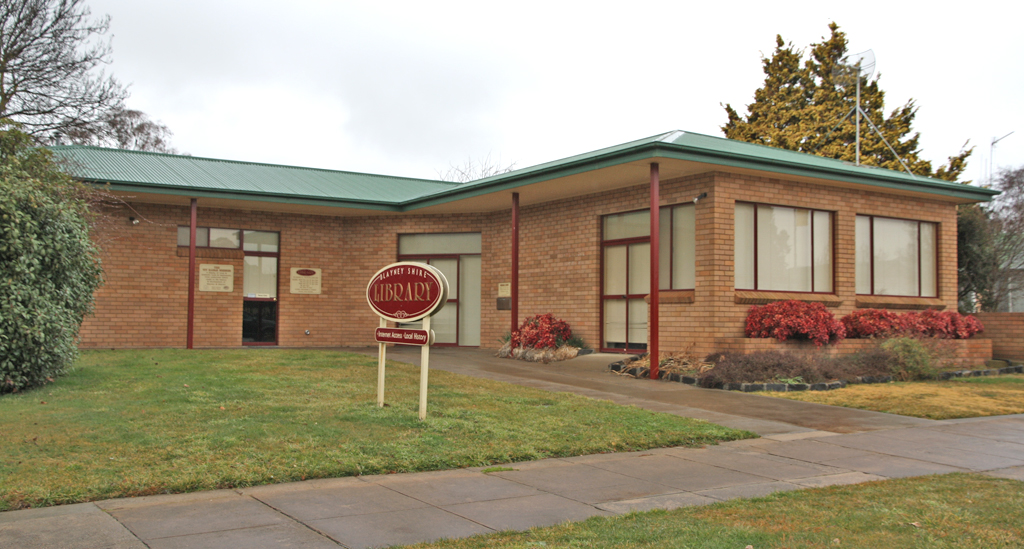
Shire Library

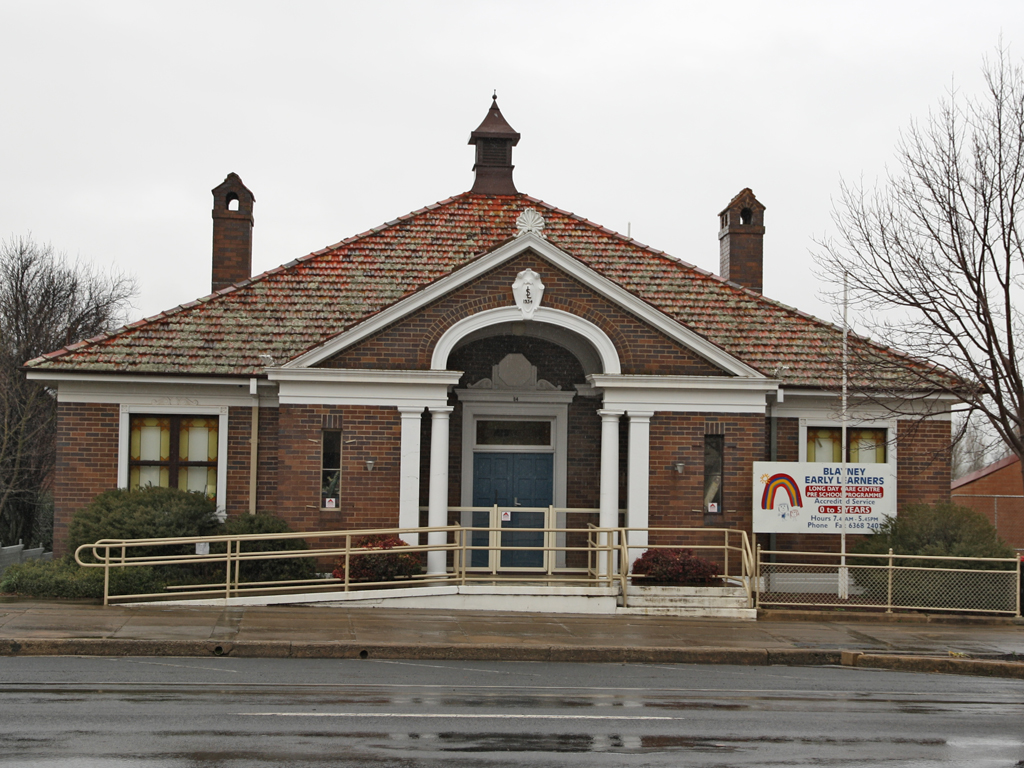
Council Chambers 1934

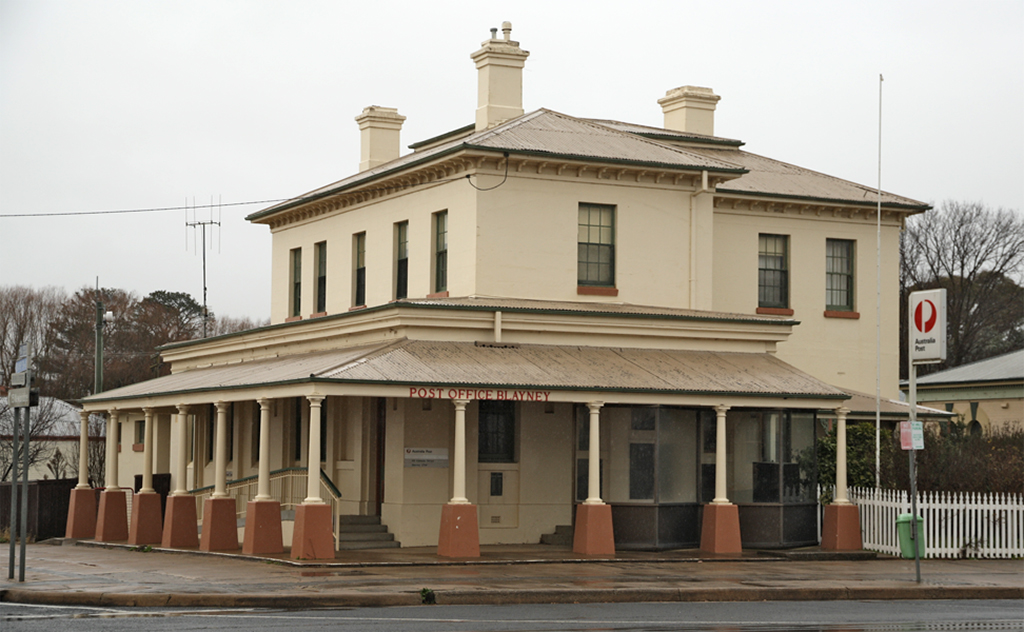
Post Office

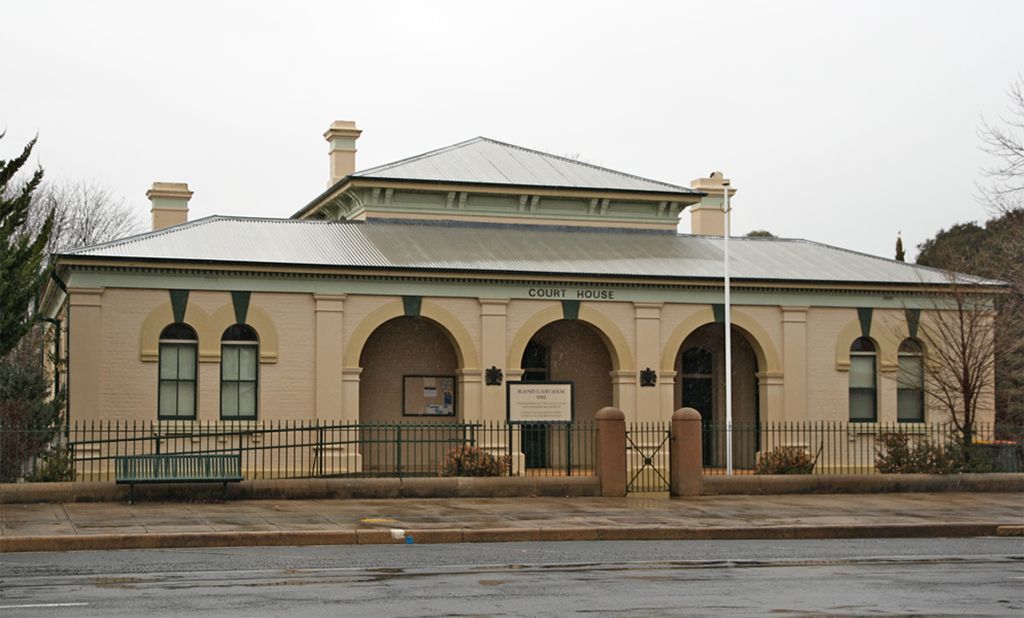
Court House

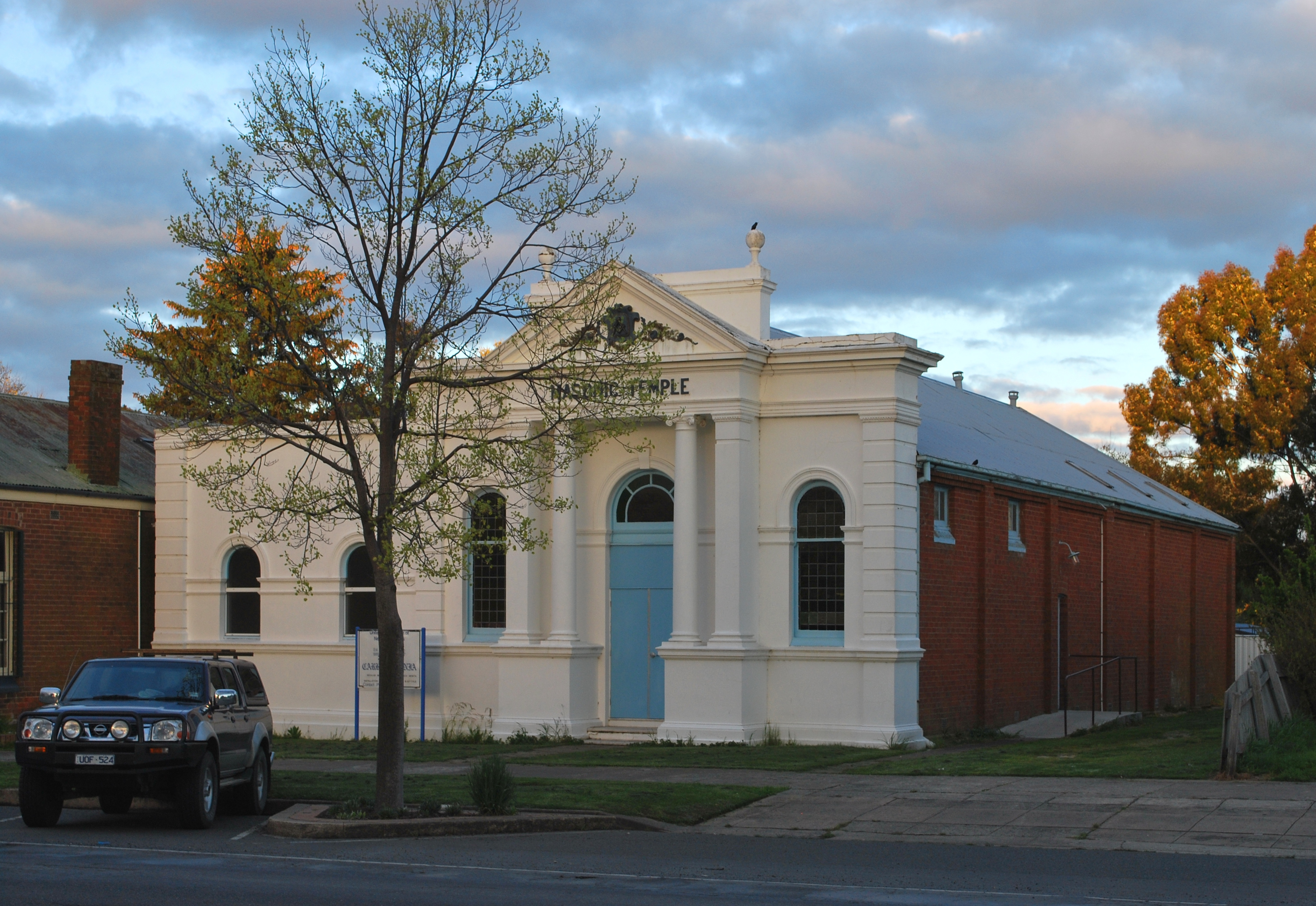
Masonic Temple

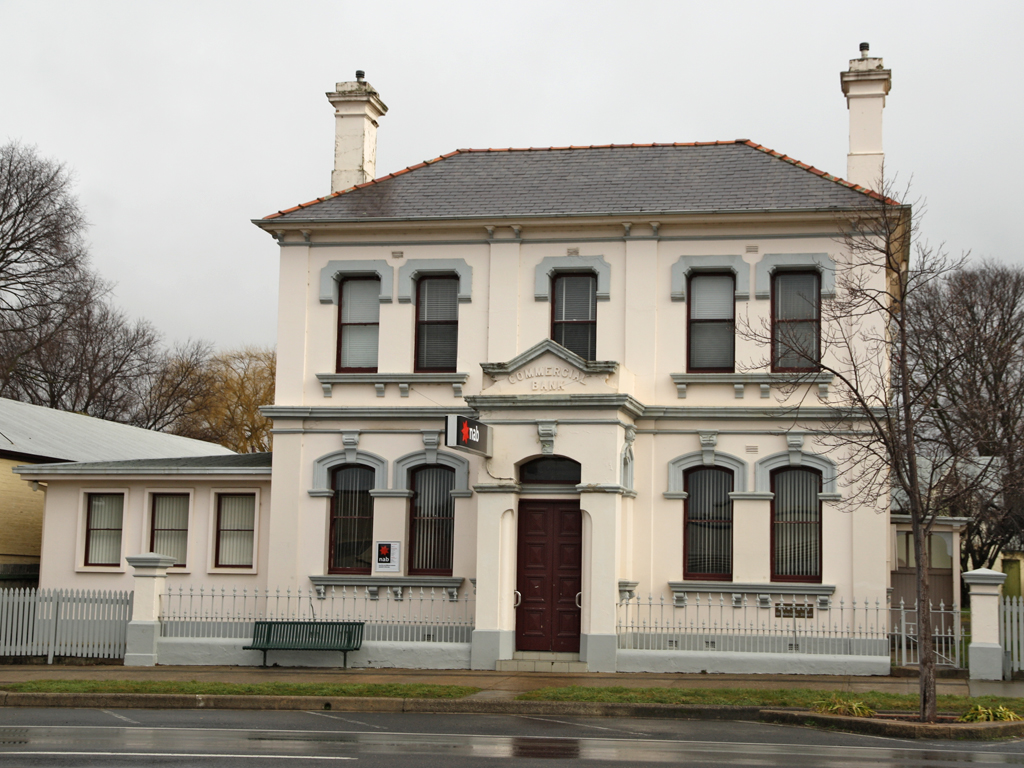
National Australia Bank

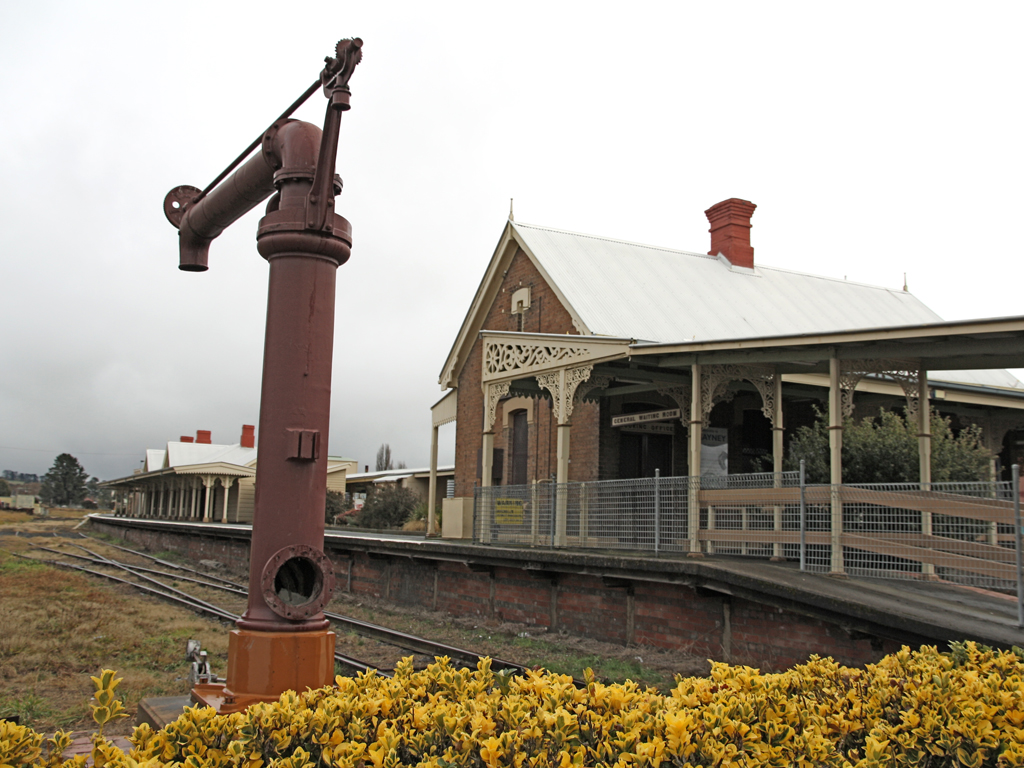
Railway Station

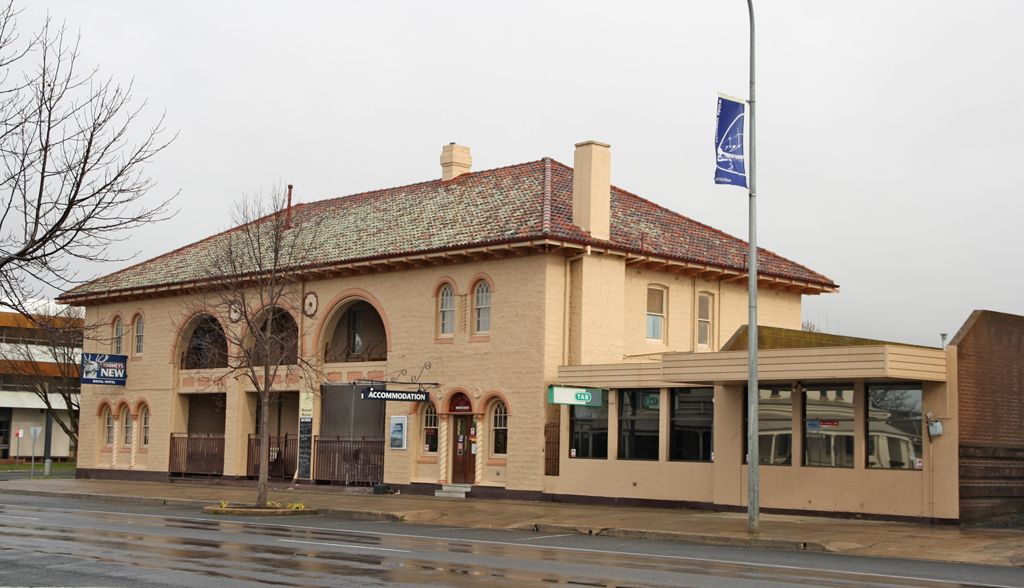
Royal Hotel

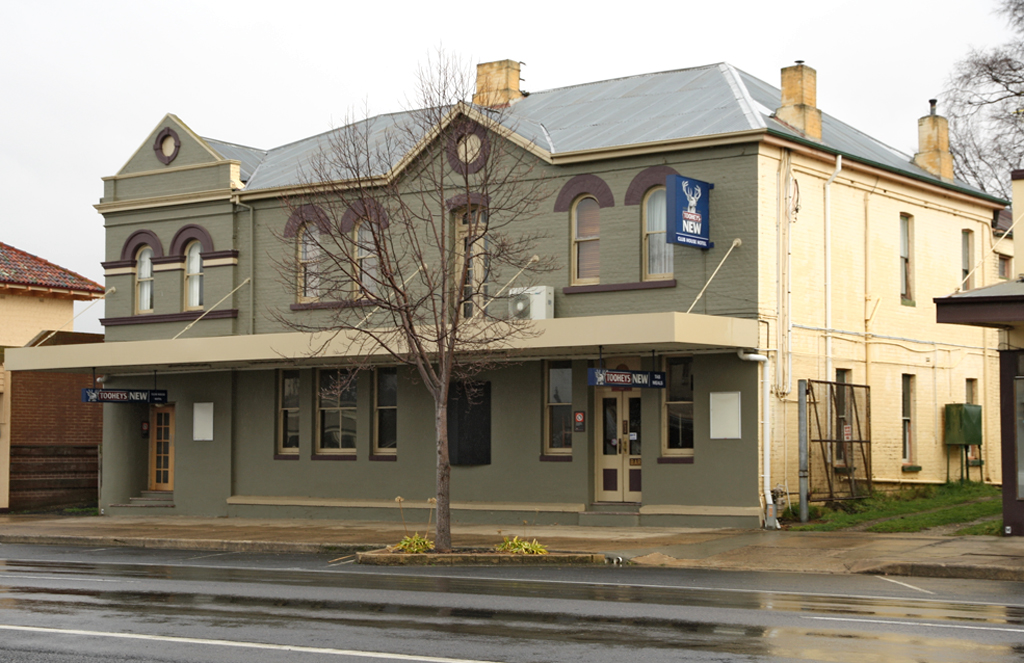
Club House Hotel

== Bibliography ==
- St. Paul's Church, Blayney, 1862-1937 : an historical sketch. Alan Dougan. [Blayney, N.S.W.? : Presbyterian Church of Australia, 1937]
- The Anglican Church of Australia, the Diocese of Bathurst : a history of the development of the Parish of Blayney, 1833-1991. [compiled and edited by J.T. Clarkson, C.H.R. Dent] Blayney, N.S.W. : Christ Church Anglican Church, 1991. ISBN 0646073656 :
- The kings colonials. Garry Reynolds; illustrated by Christine Reynolds. [Millthorpe, N.S.W. : G. Reynolds], 1982. ISBN 0959305904 :
- Together travel on : commemorating 150 years of Christian worship, service and mission through the Blayney [Uniting] Church, 1843 to 1993 : Wesleyan Methodist (1843-1902), Methodist (1902-1977), Uniting (1977-1993) Blayney, [N.S.W.] : Uniting Church in Australia, 1993.
- Dear Mother : a nominal roll of the men and women from Blayney and surrounding districts who served "Queen and country" in the South African (Boer) War 1899-1902. Blayney, N.S.W. : Blayney Shire Local & Family History Group Inc., 2002. ISBN 095815130X
- Notes on the geology of the Blayney area. G.A.M. Henderson. [Canberra] : BMR Geology and Geophysics, Australia, c1991. ISBN 0642166978
- Blayney, list of interments : from Blayney Shire records and headstones found in cemetery. compiled by Helen Jeuken and Alan Nesbitt. Bathurst, N.S.W. : Bathurst Family History Research, 1989. ISBN 0958841950
- The Blayney advocate and Carcoar herald. Originally published weekly: Blayney, N.S.W. : John Mellor. National Library of Australia Microform
- Blayney Shire pioneer register St. Joseph's Central School Blayney. Blayney, N.S.W. : St Joseph's Central School, Blayney, P. & F. Association, [1993] ISBN 0646153730
- Blayney District Hospital, 1910-1960 : a brief history to commemorate its 50th anniversary. compiled [i.e. written] by A.A. Cheney [Blayney, N.S.W. : Blayney Newspaper Co., 1960]
- Blayney Public School : established 1858 [Sandra Retallack] Blayney, N.S.W., : Blayney Public School, 2008. ISBN 9780959167719
