= Old Errowanbang Woolshed =

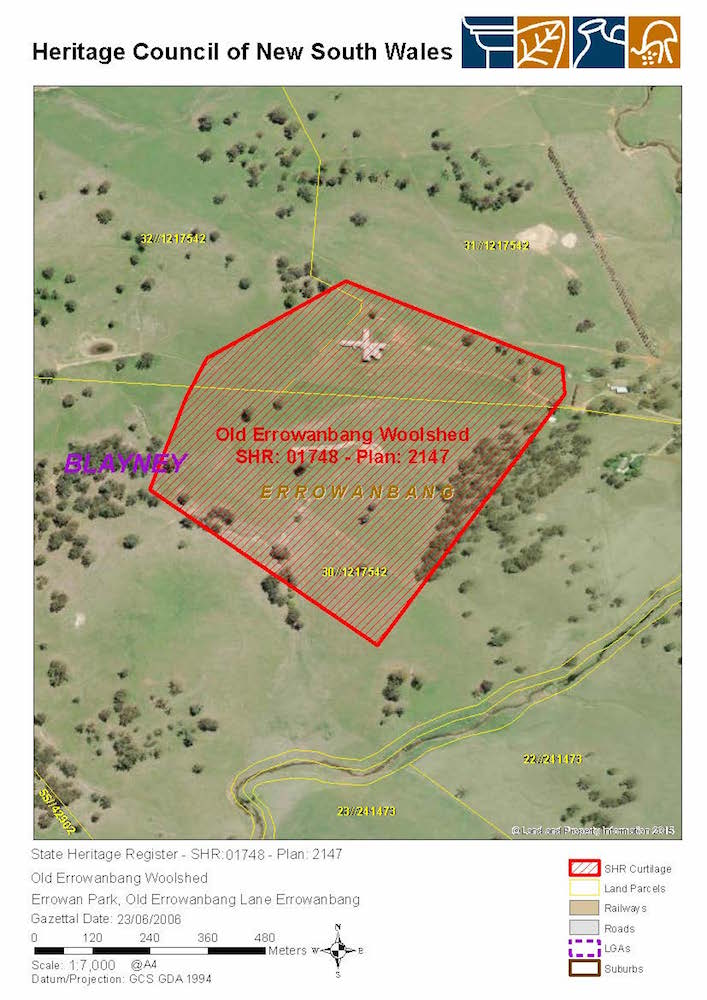
- Heritage boundaries

- Location within New South Wales Location within Australia
- 33.5421°S 149.0338°E
- Location: Errowan Park, Old Errowanbang Lane, Errowanbang, Blayney Shire, New South Wales, Australia

History
- Built: 1886–1886

Site notes
- Architect: Watt

New South Wales Heritage Register
- Official name: Old Errowanbang Woolshed; Errowanbang Woolshed
- Type: state heritage (built)
- Designated: 23 June 2006
- Reference no.: 1748
- Type: Woolshed/Shearing Shed
- Category: Farming and Grazing

Old Errowanbang Woolshed is a heritage-listed shearing shed at Errowan Park, Old Errowanbang Lane, Errowanbang, Blayney Shire, New South Wales, Australia. It was designed by Watt and built in 1886. It is also known as Errowanbang Woolshed. It was added to the New South Wales State Heritage Register on 23 June 2006.

== History ==
=== Pre-European ===
Prior to European occupation of the district, the area between Bathurst and Cowra was the home of the Wiradjuri people.

=== Early exploration ===
Following the crossing of the Blue Mountains in 1813 by Gregory Blaxland, William Lawson and William Wentworth, the surveyor George William Evans was sent to survey a road to the plains beyond. In 1815 he continued his work working southwest from the site of Bathurst through the areas now known as Charlotte Creek, Hobby's Yards, Mount Macquarie, Lyndhurst and Gooloogong.

In July 1815, Lawson was made Commandant of Bathurst. He died at his home, "Veteran Hall" on 16 June 1850.

=== Errowanbang station ===
Governor Darling opened the lands west of the Macquarie River for occupation in 1826. Lawson's eldest son, William Lawson the younger, was allowed to occupy "land beyond the limits of location" and with his father established seven stations west of the Great Dividing Range. Among these was Errowanbang in the parishes of Beaufort and Blake on Flyers Creek. A Church and School Estate was established to the east of Flyers Creek and Lawson the younger settled to the west of the creek also managing the Church and School Estate. When the Church and School Estate was resumed in 1835, he acquired some of the land.

With the use of convict labour, Lawson the younger built a homestead on the property around 1827. The house was built of handmade bricks packed with cow hair and mud, stringybark shingles and cedar joinery. The cellar is thought to have also served as the pit for sawing timber during construction and later to house convicts. A fruit orchard was established close to Flyers Creek where Lawson the younger also planted willows. He built the first woolshed on Errowanbang, probably the first woolshed in the district. Built of bush timber with a high gable, it was 120 feet long and 40 feet wide and stood behind the homestead. It was destroyed by strong winds in 1967–8.

He died in February 1865, and his younger brother Thomas James Lawson inherited the property, and married Eleanor M. Murray, daughter of the Surveyor-General W. R. Davidson, eight months later.

Details of when grazier Henry Grimshaw Lomax purchased Errowanbang have not been researched, but he was in possession of the property by 1879. Little other information is known of this period, although he is believed to have added a kitchen wing to the homestead.

Between 1878 and 1881 Lomax and Edmund Wigley Severne, trading as H. G. Lomax, conditionally purchased many hundreds of acres of crown land in the Carcoar area. In 1885 they dissolved their partnership and liquidated their assets. Lomax used legal manoeuvres to keep his ex-partner from discovering the full nature of the disbursement.

Lomax sold Errowanbang to F. R. C. Hopkins and Alexander Wilson (brother of Sir Samuel Wilson) in November 1885. The sale included adjoining properties which had been conditionally purchased by Lomax, but when after a year Lomax had not produced, as promised, their certificates of conformity, Hopkins sued him for £2000.

Around 1886 the present woolshed was built. Designed by an architect named Watt, it is a massive building with four levels. Built of white cypress pine at a cost of £5,000, it is reckoned to incorporate 5 tons of nails and bolts. The shed was designed with 40 stands and could hold 3,000 sheep. Also shearing sheep from Panuara station, Hopkins' ambition was to shear 100,000 sheep in one season. The best achieved was 90,000.

Wilson left the partnership before 1900 and Hopkins became the sole owner of Errowanbang. The station was divided, Hopkins taking the eastern area of Flyers Creek and the name Errowanbang. To avoid confusion, the remaining part of the property containing the large c.1886 woolshed and the original homestead is generally now known as Old Errowanbang. Hopkins moved to Stokefield at Carcoar while he built a new home on the property. Hopkins continued to graze sheep and a small number of larger stock on his 19,750 acres until his death in 1916. Hopkins' son Rawdon inherited his father's estate.

Much of the land which had been retained by Hopkins was resumed under the provisions of the Crown Land Consolidation Act of 1913 and Rawdon Hopkins was left with 5,568 acres. On his remaining land, Rawdon Hopkins ran his Corriedale Stud and built a new woolshed. This shed was burnt in 1928 and then rebuilt, incorporating much of the original structure.

Sales of the resumed land proved to be very successful. 13 allotments and a reserve of 3,000 acres had been created from 13,300 acres with the reserved land being set aside for building up small farmers near Burnt Yards. 1,000 acres were also held as a mining reserve. 392 applications were received of which 362 were admitted to a ballot.

The next owner of the western part of the original Errowanbang has not been properly researched, although around 1900 Charles Hebden moved into the original homestead. Hebden ran a thoroughbred blood horse stud as well as sheep and cattle on the property.

On Old Errowanbang, Hebden was responsible for the construction of a water race system running from the north-east corner on Flyers Creek through to Wire Gully mine. A branch at Triangle ran south to the woolshed where it was intended to power the shearing equipment. This did not happen and the water was used for filling dams and supplying the homestead. Another water race ran from the eastern side of Flyers Creek, near Hopkins new homestead, to the Junction Reefs Mines.

Around 1909, Hebden began to sell off some of his land including country in the Panuara area.

Hebden died on Errowanbang in 1915. By that time his property was known as Errowanbang Limited. Hebden's nephew, Richard Officer, was the first manager and chief policy holder and managed the property until his death in 1930.

Richard Officer and his wife renovated the homestead, adding a new wing to the house to provide accommodation for a classroom, a room for a governess, an office and a dressing room. Bathrooms were also added and the ceilings of the original part renewed.

Errowanbang continued to run sheep, including a stud of Romney Marsh. Other stock included cattle and draught horses.

The water race continued to operate although it frequently silted up. Eventually rabbit holes caused too many problems and it fell into disuse.

After Richard Officer's death, his brother Ernie took over the management for a short time until Bill McKay came with his wife and two children. The McKays remained at Errowanbang until 1940.

Ted Holland followed Bill McKay as manager until 1952 when this part of the property was resumed and opened for Soldier Settlements in 1952. A ballot was held for the 11 available blocks with J.W. Harries taking the homestead block.

The homestead and outbuildings were used for the accommodation of some of the families and for builders working on new houses for the settlers. Some of the buildings around the homestead were purchased by settlers and (presumably) relocated. These included:

- the overseer's cottage which was erected on John Moore's property
- the cook house used as part of a woolshed by George Simons
- the shearers' huts which were used for material for Frank Press's house
- the showers from the shearer's quarters were purchased by Gordon Adamson.

Old Errowanbang remains in the ownership of the Harries family.

=== William Lawson (1774-1850) ===
William Lawson was born on 2 June 1774 near London and was educated in London, becoming a surveyor. On 15 June 1799 he paid £300 for his commission in the New South Wales Corps arriving in Port Jackson in 1800 before being sent to serve at Norfolk Island. On his return to Sydney in 1806 he was promoted to a Lieutenant.

After serving as aide-de-camp to Major George Johnston, commandant at Newcastle then in Governor Macquarie's Veteran Corps, Lawson retired to his grant at Prospect. In 1813 he joined the expedition across the Blue Mountains with Blaxland and Wentworth.

Lawson returned to service in 1819 as Commandant of the settlement of Bathurst from where he spent time surveying the district, resigning from the post in 1824. During his explorations he discovered coal near Mount York, copper north of Bathurst and silver in the western country.

Acquiring large areas of land west of the Great Dividing Range, Lawson became an important landholder as well as one of the 12 largest stockowners in the Bathurst district carrying sheep, cattle and horses.

In 1843 Lawson became one of the first elected members of the Legislative Council after successfully standing for the seat of Cumberland.

Lawson married Sarah Leadbeater with whom he had 11 children, four of who died in infancy. Sarah died in 1830 aged 48 and was buried at their Prospect property, Veteran Hall. Her remains were later transferred to the Lawson vault at St Bartholomew's Church at Prospect.

William Lawson died on 16 June 1850 at Prospect.

=== William Lawson the younger (1804-1861) ===
William Lawson's second son (also called William) was born at Norfolk Island in 1804. After accompanying his father to Bathurst, he became the first native born white Australian to receive a grant of land for sheep grazing in the Western Country.

In 1836, William Lawson the younger was appointed a magistrate and was a member of the Bathurst bench until 1852.

Allowed to occupy lands "beyond the limits of location" he established and managed, with his father, seven pioneering stations including Errowan-bang on Flyers Creek.

In 1832 he married Caroline Icely, sister of Thomas Icely of the nearby Coombing Park with whom he had ten children. After the death of his father, William Lawson the younger moved to Veteran Hall, Prospect where he died in 1861. Caroline died in 1875

=== Francis Rawdon Chesney Hopkins ===
- See main article F. R. C. Hopkins

Hopkins was born at Coolah Point near Mumbai in 1848, the son of a Royal Navy captain. He was sent to live with his uncle General Rawdon Chesney in Ireland. At the age of 16 he came to Australia to live with another uncle, Sir Samuel Wilson, a pastoralist in Victoria. Eventually he came to manage Pericoota station in the Riverina district where he married Sarah Jane Kennedy in 1884. Meanwhile, he had entered into partnerships with Messrs Robertson and Wagner, the owners of Pericoota, sharing properties in Queensland. Leaving Pericoota at the age of 38, he sold his Queensland interests and went into partnership with Alexander Wilson to own Errowanbang. The partnership was dissolved soon after, leaving Hopkins as the sole owner.

Wilson was the managing director of Australian Estates at the time of the purchase and with Hopkins also had interests in gold and copper mining at Blayney. Hopkins later had interests in the Wire Gully gold mine.

Hopkins was a founding member of the Pastoralists' Union in New South Wales. He was well known for his substantial efforts for the Rabbit Board and the Pastures Protection Board, serving for many years as chairman and director of the Carcoar Branch.

Other bodies which Hopkins was involved in include the Montenegrin Fund, Allied Day Committee and the French Australian League.

Hopkins was a keen writer, preparing a number of plays which were successful in Australia, Canada and the United States. He also wrote verse and a number of books.

Hopkins died after falling down an old shaft on the property on 20 July 1916. It is thought that he was trying to make the shaft safe, having lost a number of sheep to insecure shafts. He was survived by his wife Sarah who died in 1942 and his son Rawdon Chesney Hopkins who died in 1973.

== Description ==
Errowanbang woolshed is one of the largest woolsheds in the Central West. Built on the side of a hill, the shed has a unique plan based on four long wings linked in the centre by the main shearing floor. The shearing floor and the wool sorting, baling and storage areas cover four levels.

Two wings of the shed are for penning sheep, one including a plunge dip and the other draughting yards. Adjacent to the plunge dip are the crooks etc. for controlling the sheep in the dip. The remaining two wings are divided along their length with one side for sheep waiting to be shorn and the other side of the division being the 40 shearing stands, 20 for each wing. The shearing stands open to a large sorting area, designed to be largely column free by the use of timber trusses supported on massive stone piers. The piers are clad in timber boarding on the shearing floor to avoid wool being caught on the timber. The stands are arranged so that the gun shearers worked in the centre of the space, closest to the sorting area with the slower shearers at the ends of the floor, where the distance for runners and sweepers collecting the wool to bring to the sorting area was the greatest.

The sorting area is symmetrical about a diagonal axis. Three classing chutes are either side of the axis and feed wool to the baling level below. A floor above the baling area, the piece picking room is accessed from stairs behind the classing bins and has a chute which led to the main wool press. Tailings and other scraps could then be fed to the press from above.

Chutes for the shorn sheep lead from the shearing area to underneath the shed and assist in bracing the structure. On the upper side of the chutes, the timber cladding has timber slats allowing sheep pushed against the ramp to have a foothold and not slip back. The original joinery for most of the stands survives, including the swing doors with their original hinges and the bracketed shelves. Next to the intersection of the two rows of shearing stands, a sliding door at low level provides access for the sheep dogs between the pens and the shearing floor. One end of the stands has been altered in the nineteenth century for mechanised shearing. The remaining 14 stands are still set up as they were for hand shearing.

The baling area has two levels, the upper level with divisions to catch the wool fed from the classing chutes above. At the centre and on the lower level was the wool press, now removed although the base is evident in the floor. From here, the bales could be moved to a storage area. A large opening at the end of the storage area originally had a flap which folded down to allow the bales to be taken out onto carts or trucks for transportation. This has been replaced with a sliding door.

The woolshed is built of cypress pine. The structure has stumps below floor level with timber posts and framing above. Wherever timber is likely to be in contact with wool, the timber is dressed and corners are chamfered. Additionally, the stone piers are faced with vertical timber boards in the shearing area and pens. The division for the shearing stands is clad with horizontal boarding. Large trusses with iron straps provide an open shearing and sorting area. Corrugated galvanised steel clads the walls and the roof. 6 over 6 pane double hung windows open to the shearing floor. Horizontal windows at high level on the walls open to the penning areas. At the walkways behind the sorting chutes, timber shutters opened as awnings to provide ventilation during shearing.

A small engine room has been built on the end of one of the shearing wings, closest to the mechanised stands. The pipework for the water race from Flyers Creek which was intended to power the shears survives close to this room.

The shed was reported to be in reasonable condition as at 25 July 2003, considering that only a small area of it was then used. Restumping had been partially undertaken in the past but needed to be completed. Most windows had been broken, largely due to hailstorms. The roofing was generally in good order although repairs of guttering were needed, particularly valley and box gutters.

== Heritage listing ==
Errowanbang Woolshed is one of the most interesting woolsheds of the Central West region of New South Wales. It is perhaps unique in Australia in being built over four levels creating a complex but highly functional structure where each stage of the shearing and sorting process from penning the sheep to sorting, baling and storing has its own distinctive space.

With 40 stands, Errowanbang Woolshed is one of the largest woolsheds in the region. Of these stands, 26 have never been adapted for mechanical shearing, providing clear evidence of two major phases of shearing practices in Australia. The original stands retain virtually all of their original fabric providing a clear picture of the working of hand shearing. Names painted on the stands provide evidence of some of the well known shearers who worked at the station in the nineteenth century.

Designed by Watts, and one of a number of woolsheds designed by architects in the late nineteenth century, the quality of workmanship in the construction of Errowanbang Woolshed is probably unsurpassed in Australia. The massive stone piers supporting the trusses over the sorting area have contributed to the long term stability of the shed. Internally, details such as the stop chamfers on all corners of timberwork where wool is being moved, good quality hardware and mitred corners of timber flooring show an unusually high attention to detail in what would elsewhere be a utilitarian building.

The penning wings of the shed are unusual in including a plunge dip and draughting yards. The incorporation of a plunge dip within the woolshed is possibly unique.

Remnant pipes near the shed provide evidence of an unfulfilled attempt at using hydraulic machinery for shearing. They are the clearest surviving evidence of the very ambitious water races which once operated from Flyers Creek to Errowanbang.

Old Errowanbang Woolshed was listed on the New South Wales State Heritage Register on 23 June 2006 having satisfied the following criteria.

The place is important in demonstrating the course, or pattern, of cultural or natural history in New South Wales.

Old Errowanbang Woolshed is historically significant for its associations with the pastoral and woolgrowing industry of colonial and 20th century NSW, especially the central tablelands, and for the evidence it demonstrates of the significant, and evolving, processes of gathering and processing wool for clothing and other manufactured products.

The place has a strong or special association with a person, or group of persons, of importance of cultural or natural history of New South Wales's history.

Old Errowanbang Woolshed is significant for its associations with the architect Watts and the small but important group of architects who designed woolsheds in the late 19th century.

The place is important in demonstrating aesthetic characteristics and/or a high degree of creative or technical achievement in New South Wales.

Old Errowanbang Woolshed is of state significance for the technical innovations evident in its four-level design and the internal arrangement of pens and shearing spaces related to the speed of individual shears; is aesthetically distinctive as a large timber building of cypress pine with multiple stories on massive stone piers, stop-chamfered posts, mitred timber flooring and high quality hardware throughout the interior, and has landmark qualities as a rambling building that steps down the hillside in its countryside setting in the Flyers Creek valley.

The place has a strong or special association with a particular community or cultural group in New South Wales for social, cultural or spiritual reasons.

Old Errownbang Woolshed has important associations with several generations of shearers, many of whom have their individual names painted on various pens; and contributes to the rural identity of the inhabitants of the Errowanbang area.

The place has potential to yield information that will contribute to an understanding of the cultural or natural history of New South Wales.

Old Errowanbang Woolshed is of state significance as a benchmark of the changing technologies of sheep shearing, with 26 hand-shearing pens and 14 later adapted to mechanical shearing, the only known internal plunge dip in the region (related to the weather conditions of the Tablelands), and the nearby water races associated with an attempt to develop hydraulic shearing equipment.

The place possesses uncommon, rare or endangered aspects of the cultural or natural history of New South Wales.

Old Errowanbang Woolshed is rare in the region and state as the only known example of its type (an architect-designed, multi-storied sheep shearing complex that could process the sheep almost entirely under cover) and for the exceptional interest of its design and construction detailing.

The place is important in demonstrating the principal characteristics of a class of cultural or natural places/environments in New South Wales.

Old Errowanbang Woolshed demonstrates the principal characteristics of sheep shearing establishments in rural NSW built in the 1880s and successively adapted to changing shearing technologies.
