= Michael Burke (bushranger) =

Australian bushranger (c. 1843 – 1863)

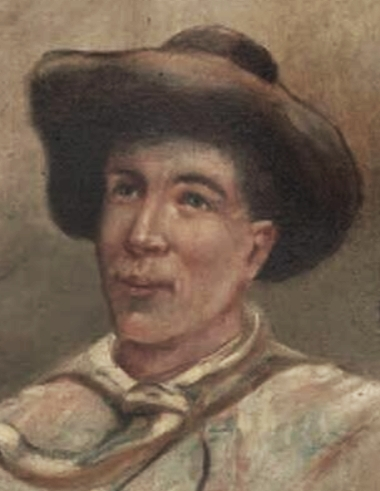
- Portrait of Burke by P. W. Marony
- Born: c. 1843; Fell Timber Creek, New South Wales, Australia
- Died: 24 October 1863; Dunns Plains, New South Wales, Australia
- Cause of death: Shot
- Occupation: Bushranger

Michael Burke (c. 1843 – 24 October 1863) was an Australian bushranger and a member of the Gardiner–Hall gang.

== Biography ==
Burke was born in 1843 near Fell Timbre Creek in the Colony of New South Wales. The only son of Michael and Bridget Bourke, immigrants from County Tipperary, Ireland, he grew up with his seven sisters. Burke never attended school but became an exceptional horseman, initially employed as a groom and jockey.

Burke's bushranging career commenced with his involvement in the theft of two horses from squatter Thomas Icely's Coombing Park estate near Carcoar. He earned notoriety as a member of the Gardiner–Hall gang, led by Frank Gardiner and Ben Hall, which was known for its daring raids and robberies throughout the central west of New South Wales. While riding with the gang, Burke earned the moniker "True Blue" as he was often clad in a distinctive suit of blue tweed.

In August 1863, Burke, along with accomplices John Gilbert, John Vane, and John O'Meally, stole thoroughbreds and a prized racehorse, Comus II, from Thomas Icely of Cliefden Station. The gang's criminal exploits extended to raids on mail coaches, storekeepers, banks, and entire towns. On 24 October of the same year, Burke participated in an assault on the residence of Gold Commissioner Henry McCrummin Keightley at Dunn's Plains, near Rockley. During the ensuing confrontation, Burke sustained a gunshot wound to the stomach. Announcing that he would not be taken alive, he fatally shot himself in the head with his revolver. His body underwent an inquest in Carcoar before being interred on his family's property in Mandurama.

At the time of Burke's death, a small ambrotype of an unidentified little girl was found in a small red bag tied around his neck. It is now in the Vaucluse House Collection, part of Museums of History New South Wales.
