= Mandurama Collection =

The Mandurama Collection contains 3,444 photographs taken by Estonian-born photographer Evan Lumme, who lived from 1865 to 1935. Lumme arrived in Australia in 1881 and set up business in Ashfield, New South Wales, as a photographer. In 1900, he moved to Orange and spent the rest of his life in that area.

The photographs were taken in the Central Tablelands of New South Wales, most being of the residents and village of Mandurama as well as Lyndhurst and Carcoar but there are images from as far west as Boorowa and many from unknown areas. In addition, the images include the residents and areas of Cowra, Boorowa, Burnt Yards, Garland, Gallymont, Neville, Shaw, Blayney and Orange.

The photographs are considered an invaluable resource for seeing Australia as it was in the Victorian and the post-Federation eras. Few collections of this size survive to this day. The reason for the survival of the Mandurama Collection is that it was forgotten after the death of Lumme. In the 1970s, the negatives were 'rediscovered' in an abandoned house in the Mandurama area.

After their rediscovery, the collection was given to the National Library of Australia, and since then has made a short return to its home of Mandurama, during the town's 125th anniversary celebrations. The photos were commemorated in a book, Faces of Mandurama, written by John Thompson in 1997.
