= Errowanbang, New South Wales =

Errowanbang New South Wales
- Coordinates: 33°32′00″S 149°03′00″E
- Population: 38 (2016 census)
- Postcode(s): 2791
- Location: 19 km (12 mi) W of Blayney
- LGA(s): Blayney Shire
- State electorate(s): Bathurst
- Federal division(s): Calare

Errowanbang is a locality in the Blayney Shire of New South Wales, Australia. It had a population of 38 as of the 2016 census.

Errowanbang Public School opened in May 1954 and closed in December 2014.

== Heritage listings ==
Errowanbang has a number of heritage-listed sites, including:

- Errowan Park, Old Errowanbang Lane: Old Errowanbang Woolshed
