= Mandurama, New South Wales =

Mandurama
- Town
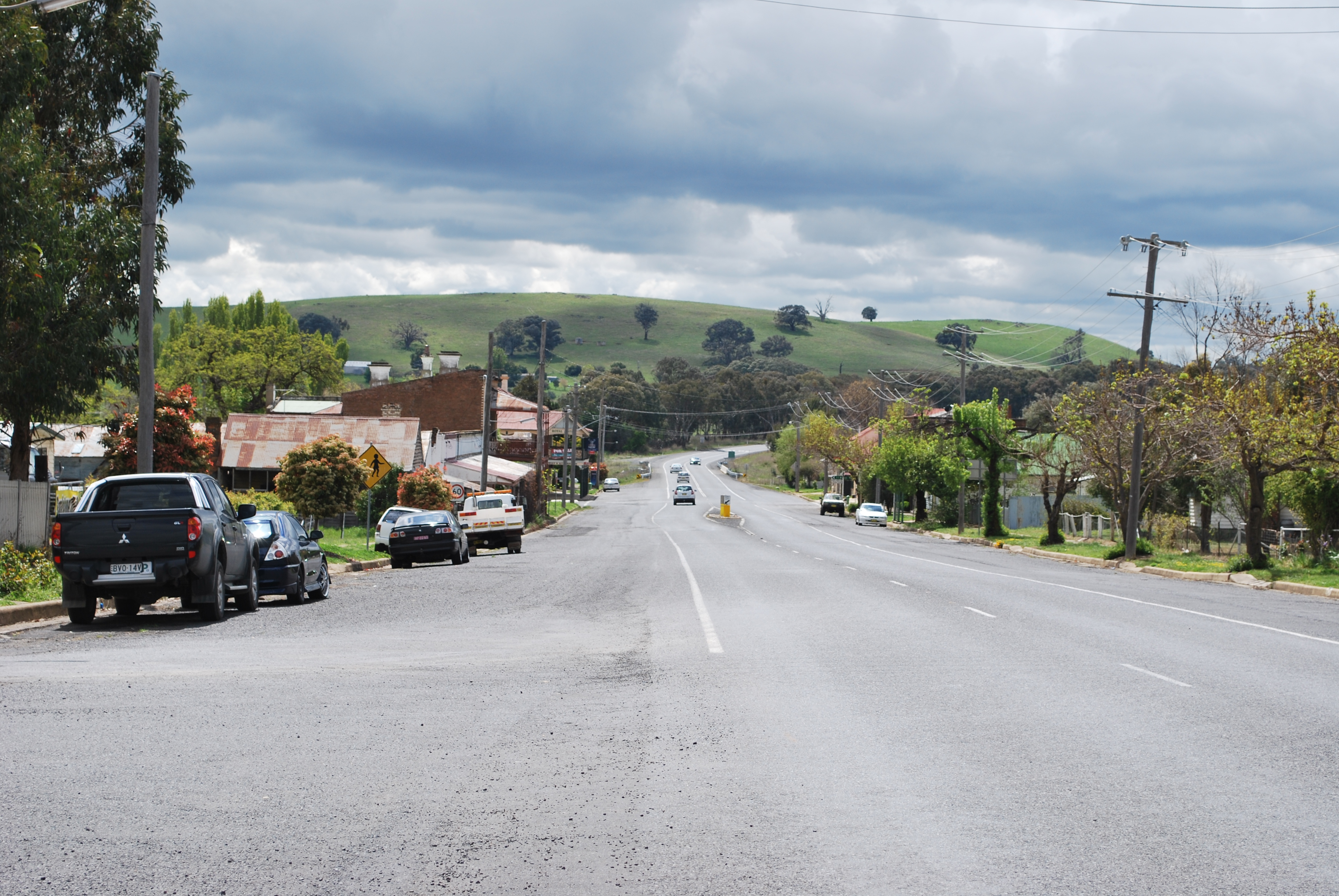
- Olive Street, the main street of Mandurama, looking north

- Coordinates: 33°39′S 149°05′E
- Country: Australia
- State: New South Wales
- LGA: Blayney Shire
- Location: 263 km (163 mi) from Sydney; 59 km (37 mi) from Bathurst
- Established: 1839

Government
  - State electorate: Bathurst
  - Federal division: Calare
- Elevation: 662 m (2,172 ft)

Population
  - Total: 355 (2016 census)
- Postcode: 2792

Mandurama is a village in the Blayney Shire, New South Wales, Australia. At the 2016 census, Mandurama and the surrounding area had a population of 345 people.

== Geography ==
Mandurama is situated 259 kilometres (161 mi) west of Sydney, 59 kilometres (37 mi) southwest of Bathurst, and 47 kilometres (29 mi) northeast of Cowra on the Mid-Western Highway.

== History ==
The site of the village and surrounding areas was home to the Wiradjuri people prior to settlement, and the name "Mandurama" is derived from their word for 'water holes'.

A prominent pastoralist, Thomas Icely, came to the colony in 1820 as a trader. In 1823 he received a land grant of 800 hectares (2,000 acres) at Saltram, in the Bathurst area. By 1831 Icely owned Coombing Park, and went on building up his acreage by purchase and further grant. By 1836 there were thirty convicts assigned to Icely's property and in September 1836 he asked the authorities for three more. Within a year he had 62 convicts at work at Coombing, assisting in the cultivation of 120 hectares (300 acres) and running sheep and cattle under two free overseers and was seeking five more convicts, but in 1839 the number had declined to fourteen in post, with a request for nine new assignees. Later Icely received a land grant of 3,440 acres (1,390 ha) which he called Mandurama. About 1870 part of Coombing Park (under the management of Thomas Icely's eldest son, Thomas Rothery Icely) was sold to John Fagan who named his station Sunny Ridge. The 60,000 Sunny Ridge property originally included the Mandurama town site.

Mandurama was established in 1876 as a privately owned village for the workers of Thomas Icely's Coombing Park. A Post Office opened in 1876, followed by a school in 1877. Mandurama has since developed, along with nearby Lyndhurst into a modest service centre for the surrounding localities and farmland.

The Royal Hotel was established 1899.

== Heritage listings ==
Mandurama has a number of heritage-listed sites, including:

- 1521 Belubula Way: Cliefden
- Cliefden Caves

Mandurama was also the central subject of the group of photographs known as the Mandurama Collection, now housed at the National Library of Australia.

== Amenities ==
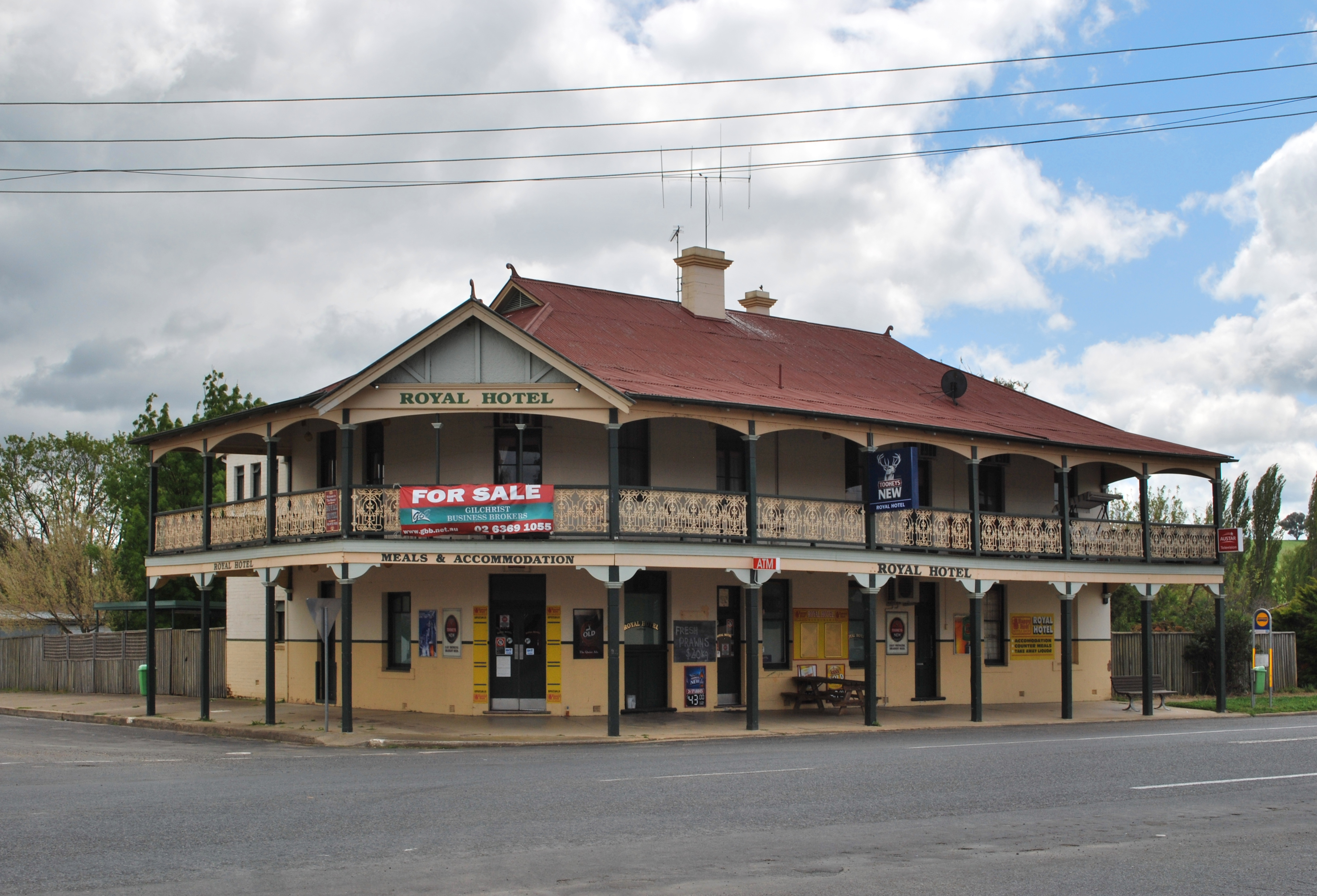
Royal Hotel at the north end of the village

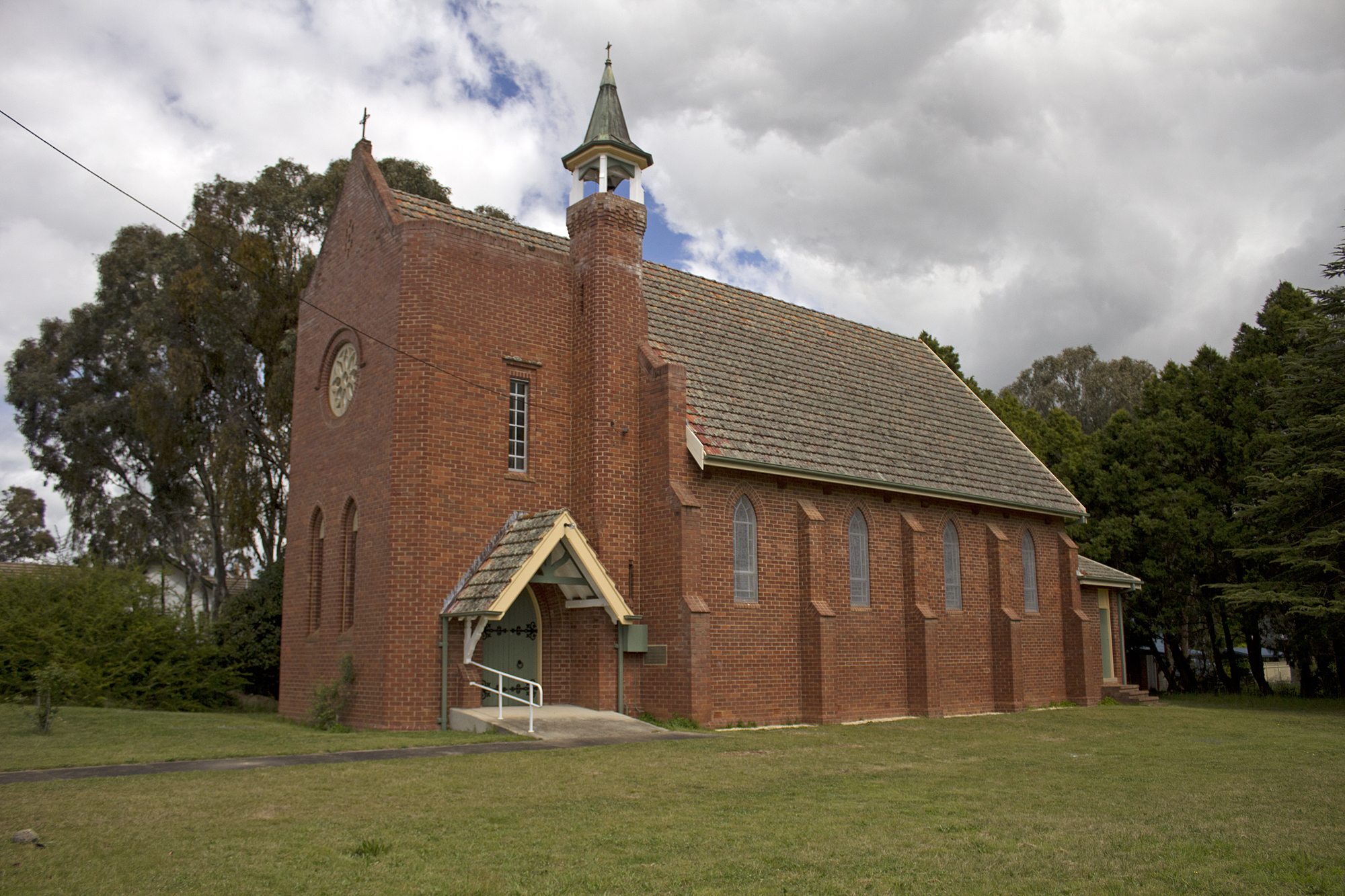
Saint Laurence O'Toole Catholic Church in Mandurama

Mandurama has a general store and cafe; service station; a New South Wales Rural Fire Service station; primary school; number of churches; golf club; tennis court; hall, and hotel.

== Attractions ==
Mandurama retains a number of historic buildings, including two former bank premises, a former primary school, the Lincoln Theatre, and the Belubula Lodge.

== See also ==
- Mandurama Collection
