= Cliefden Caves =

Caves in New South Wales, Australia

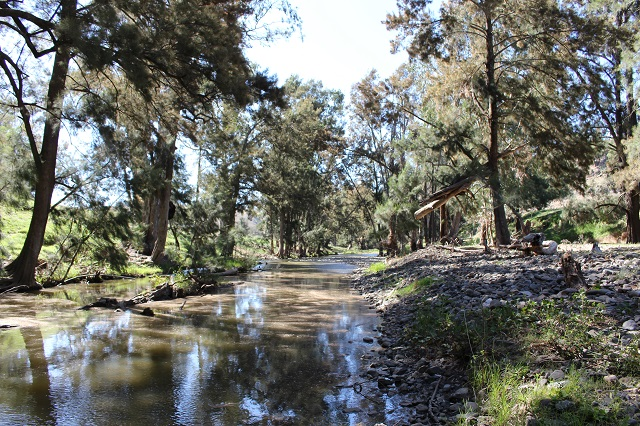
- Natural and cultural landscape, Belubula River
- Interactive map of Cliefden Caves
- Location: Mandurama, New South Wales, Australia
- Coordinates: 33°35′00″S 148°53′44″E
- Discovery: 1815 – George Evans
- Geology: Limestone

Cliefden Caves
- Location within New South Wales
- Location: New South Wales
- Governing body

Register of the National Estate
- Official name: Cliefden Caves Area
- Designated: 11 August 1987
- Reference no.: 000958

New South Wales Heritage Register
- Official name: Cliefden Caves Area
- Designated: 30 August 1987
- Reference no.: 01996

The Cliefden Caves is a heritage-listed geoheritage site at Mandurama, in the Central West region of New South Wales, Australia. The caves comprise Ordovician fossil localities, limestone caves, a spring and tufa dams, and a site where limestone was first discovered in inland Australia.

It has been ranked among the 70 most significant fossil sites in Australia by the Australian Heritage Council (2012) and as the thirteenth most significant limestone cave site in Australia by Davey. The site was nominated to the Register of the National Estate by the Geological Society of Australia in the late 1970s and registered in 1987. It was added to the New South Wales State Heritage Register on 30 August 2017.

== History ==
Aboriginal Occupation

The Wiradjuri language group have lived in the Lachlan River Valley, including the Clifeden Caves Area on the Belubula River. Camp sites and several scarred trees near the site provide evidence for this. Skeletal remains found in the caves document occupation from at least 6,000 years ago, however, it is likely that Aboriginal people have been living in the area for much of the 30,000 years since occupation of the Australian continent began.

Geology and the Cliefden Karst

The outcrop of Cliefden Caves Limestone at the junction of Limestone Creek and the Belubula River was first discovered during the explorations of surveyor George Evans on 24 May 1815 (2 years after the crossing of the Blue Mountains). A cave was recorded on the southern bank of the Belubula River as early as 1832 (Lands Department, 1832) and a map from 1883 shows the location of Bushrangers Cave, The Murder Caves and Immense Cave, apparently Main Cliefden Cave.

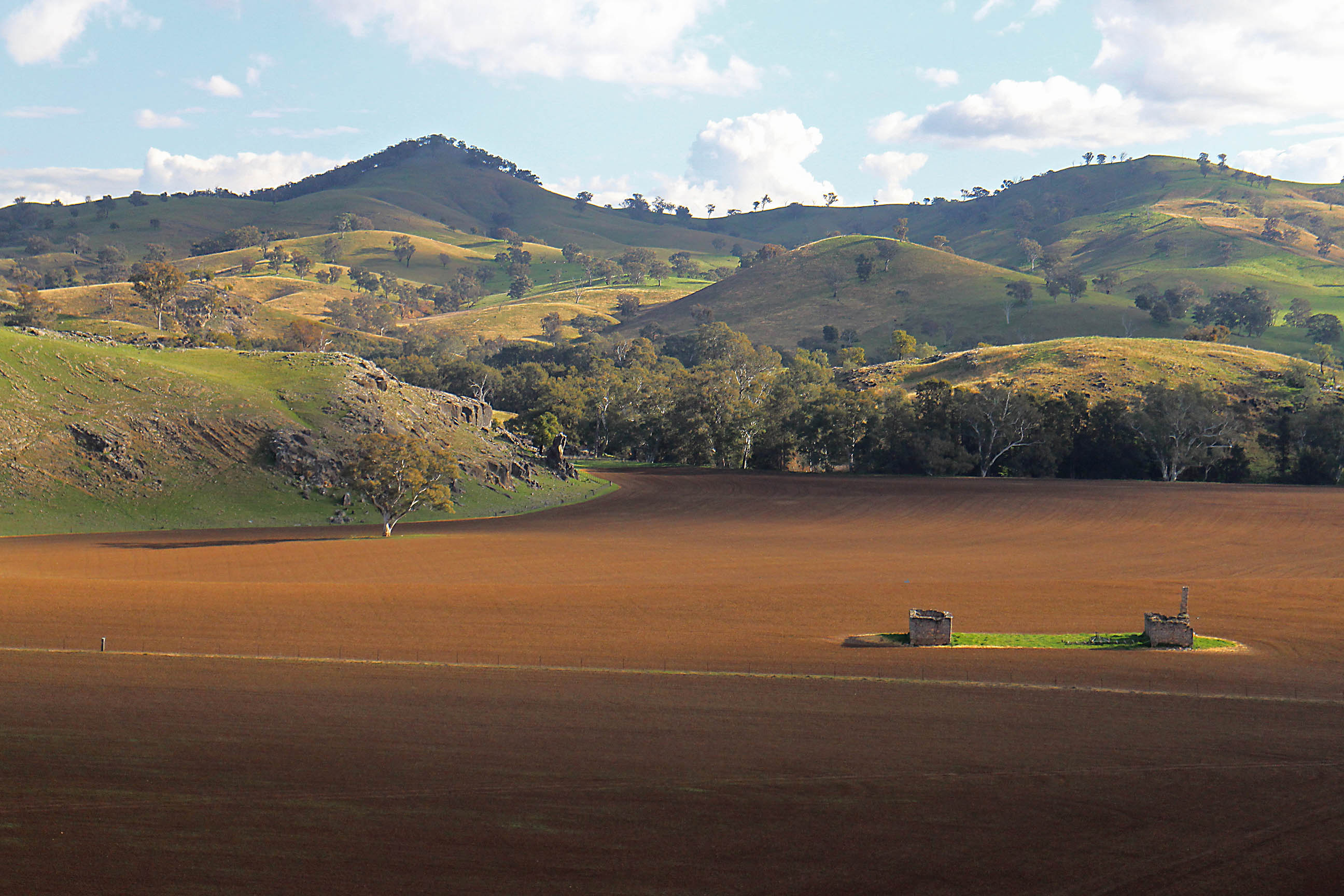
Ruin of "Cliefden Springs" house located on Island Flat, Cliefden NSW Australia

The first land grants, of 2460 acres each at Cliefden Springs and Cliefden, were taken up by brothers F.J. and W.M. Rothery in 1832. The barn at the homestead has bullet holes, which occurred when the Rothery family was held up by Ben Hall's gang in the 1860s.

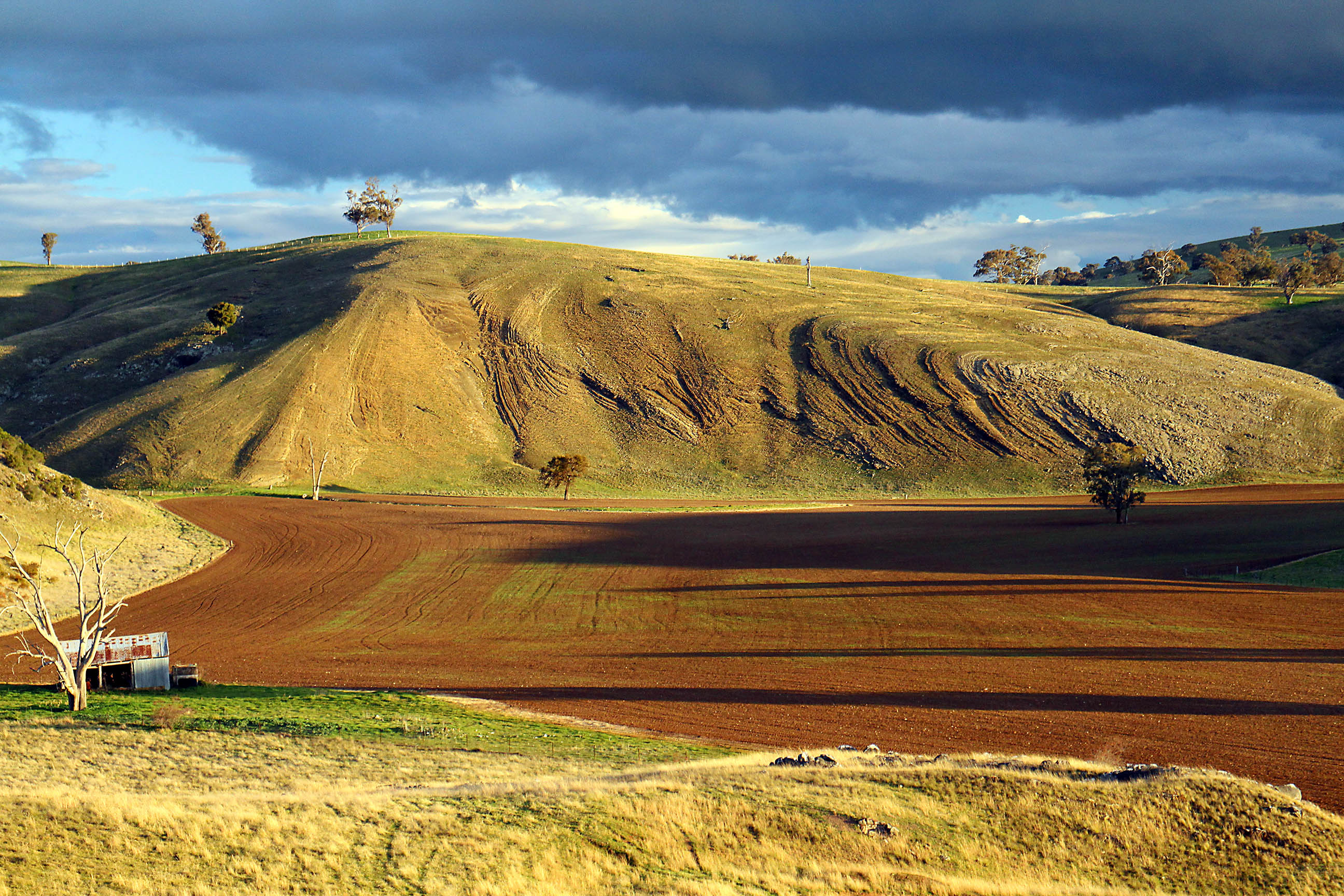
Fossil Hill, Cliefden NSW Australia

Surveyor and leading speleologist Oliver Trickett and J. C. Wiburd, caretaker of Jenolan Caves, visited Fossil Hill and several of the caves in 1908 “in connection with their protection on the proposed resumption of the Cliefden Estate”. They described how many of the cave formations had been soiled by visitors' hands. They examined the Main Cave and reported that it was “well worth preserving”. Anderson (1924) similarly concluded that the caves were well worth preserving.

In August 1932, 1,000 specimens of cave formations were removed from the lower level of Cliefden Main Cave by the Australian Museum to create a cave exhibit in the museum. The material collected proved to be insufficient, and a further 1,000 specimens were collected in April 1934.

In the 1950s, Stevens was able to show the limestone was of Ordovician age, the first recording of limestone from this period in New South Wales. Geologists around the world regard it as a superb example of an Ordovician island faunal assemblage

By the 1950s, the Cliefden caves had become popular with speleological groups. Main Cave was gated in 1958. Following some problems with visitors to the caves, the property owner, Bruce Dunhill, asked the recently formed Orange Speleological Society (OSS) to instigate a system to control access to the caves. OSS continues to co-ordinate access to the caves and to advise owners on the management and protection.

The site has been ranked among the 70 most significant fossil sites in Australia by the Australian Heritage Council and as the thirteenth most significant limestone cave site in Australia by Davey.

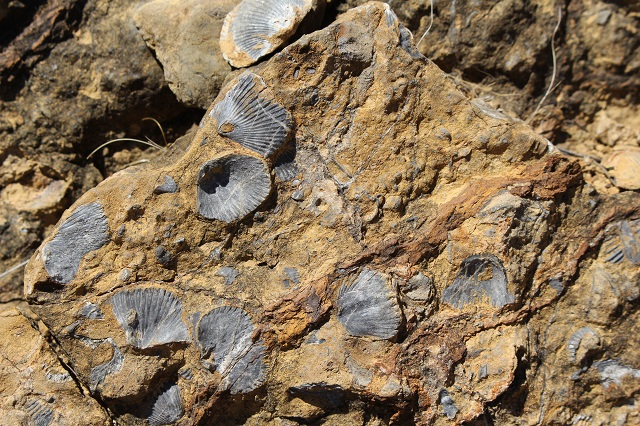
Shell fossils

The area is particularly rich in fossil material and has become known as one of the best documented Late Ordovician successions in Australia. The book "Australia's fossil heritage" states that "The site is unusual because of the well exposed, diverse faunas showing the progression from near-shore to deep water marine environments. It contains abundant examples of some of the earliest shell beds in the geological record and the earliest rugose corals known. More than 180 species have been recorded from the Cliefden Caves Limestone Group and the Malongulli Formation. The Cliefden Caves - Belubula River Valley sites contain the best exposures of Late Ordovician island marine invertebrate fossil assemblages in Australia. The sites include the type localities for over 100 species."

== Description ==
The Cliefden Caves area in the Central Tablelands of NSW is located between the towns of Carcoar and Canowindra. The caves are situated in the Belubula River valley. Much of the valley has been cleared for cropping on the river flats and grazing on the hillsides. Steeper areas of exposed limestone retain more of their original vegetation, including large areas of the critically endangered ecological community White Box - Yellow Box - Blakely's Red Gum Grassy Woodland.

The Belubula Valley is excavated in rocks of the Late Ordovician Period, including (in ascending order) the Walli Volcanics, Cliefden Caves Limestone, Malongulli Formation and Angullong Volcanics. The region surrounding the Cliefden Caves is an internationally significant palaeontological and geological site that records the evolution of a tropical volcanic island over an interval of about 5 million years, from the development of a fringing lagoonal and atoll to its eventual subsidence and drowning. Superimposed on this history is the relatively recent Cliefden Caves karst system.

The Ordovician limestone is particularly fossiliferous, and the area has long been known nationally and internationally as having the best late Ordovician outcrops in Australia. The fossils include the world's oldest known in-situ brachiopod shell beds, some of the earliest-known rugose corals in the geological record, and (in the overlying Malongulli Formation) one of the most diverse deep-water sponge faunas ever recorded. Many genera and species of fossils are unique to the area.

Many of the fossils are found in the rocks forming Fossil Hill, comprising spectacularly exposed dipping strata spanning a period of just over one million years. Fossils have also been described from the limestone on the adjacent Dunhill Bluff and Trilobite Hill, and from the siltstones and interbedded limestones between Trilobite Hill and Coppermine Creek.

The Cliefden Caves karst system is one of the most cavernous limestone areas in New South Wales and contains over 100 recorded caves. The larger caves include Main Cave, Murder, Boonderoo, Trapdoor, Taplow Maze, Island, Transmission and Malongulli. More than 90 karst features have been identified, including well-developed caves, dolines, tufa deposits and a warm (thermal) spring. The caves contain numerous and diverse speleothems, including extensive arrays of helictites, large dogtooth spar crystals, blue speleothems and "boxwork" ceilings in addition to more commonly found speleothems such as stalagmites, stalactites, shawls and flowstone. The speleothems at Cliefden range in colour from clear through pure white, yellow to orange and several rare formations of sky-blue and aqua green. All the major caves are locked and gated to protect them, however speleological and scientific work is allowed under a strict permit system.

The landscape also provides evidence of a range of above-ground karst features, such as karren and dolines. A thermal spring in the area is one of only three thermal springs associated with karst in NSW. Studies of the Tufa (calcite) deposits on Davis Creek have contributed to knowledge of the late Holocene period change.

The area is a microbat hotspot with 15 confirmed species and another three species possibly present. One of the caves is used as an overwintering habitat for Miniopterus schriebersii oceanensis (Eastern Bentwing Bat) and another is used as a maternity cave for Rhinolophus megaphyllus (Common Horseshoe Bat).

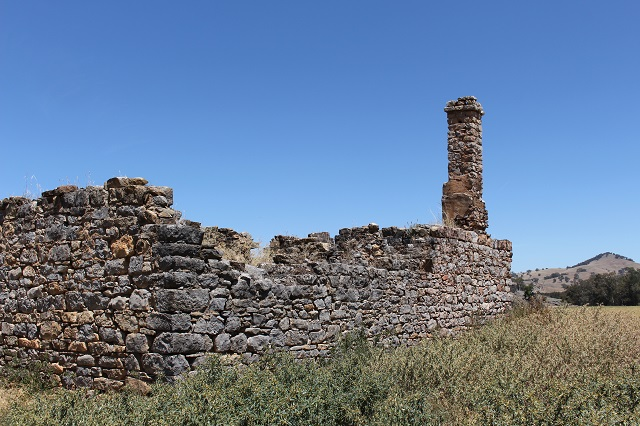
Rothery's Ruins

The site contains features associated with the historical development of the place. These include Rothery's Ruins and the Old Barite Mine.

=== Condition of the caves ===
In common with most other karsts of the Central West, the Cliefden karst has been cleared of native vegetation for grazing and cropping and suffered associated changes to groundwater. Grazing pressure and other human activity over 175 years have had profound impacts on the endemic flora of the region, especially the karst-specific species and communities at Cliefden, which remain poorly conserved.

The caves system and surface exposures of the fossil beds remain intact and retain a high degree of integrity, despite increasing pressure from over-collecting of specimens.

== Scientific value ==
The NSW National Parks and Wildlife Service states that "...lesser known karst environments can also contain extensive and well-developed karst features, like those at Cliefden and Walli. In some cases, these features are of regional and state significance, highlighting the importance of all karst environments, whether publicly or privately managed." The report also states that "Thermal springs ... are rare in NSW and, besides Wee Jasper, occur only at Cliefden and Yarrangobilly caves. The report also describes Cliefden Caves as an important karst site.

With more than one hundred recorded caves, Cliefden Caves is one of the most cavernous limestone areas in New South Wales. The caves at Cliefden have a network pattern guided by geological structure. While they are located close to the Belubula River, there is no evidence that streams or the river have ever flowed through the caves. The caves show evidence of solution by rising groundwater, possibly related to the adjacent thermal spring. One of the most significant caves at Cliefden is Taplow Maze Cave, with a network of passages over 3 km long (survey in progress by the Sydney University Speleological Society). Compared with other scientifically studied caves in central-western NSW (Walli, Borenore, Stuart Town & Wellington), Cliefden Caves contain an abundance and great diversity of speleothems (stalagmites & stalactite etc.) most in excellent condition, including significant deposits of helictites, rare blue stalactites known from only one other locality in NSW, and very rare polyhedral, monocrystalline stalactites and columns (Osborne, 1978).

Some of the sediments at Cliefden Caves, particularly the laminated muds are quite unlike those of other NSW caves. They contain unusual minerals and an important record of past environments. Deposits of fossil bones occur in several caves, but have been little studied. Molnar et al. identified a Ghost Bat tooth from Cliefden making Cliefden Caves one of the most southerly locations for this genus, now restricted to warmer parts of Australia with a minimum January temperature above 20 degrees.

Unlike the fossil sites, there has been little recent scientific research on Cliefden Caves, mainly due to a shortage of funding and of cave science specialists. The caves have great research potential, particularly in relation to the determination of past climates and hydrological conditions.

The construction of a dam at the Needles Gap site on the Belubula River will completely flood most of the caves, destroying their heritage value and preventing future study. Other dam sites called Cranky Rock and Cranky Rock Alternate also affect the Cliefden area.

== Davys Creek Tufa Dams ==
Active tufa dams in creeks are uncommon in NSW and have received little study. The tufa dams in Davys Creek are the most studied in the State. Drysdale et al. showed that deposition at the tufa dams was dependent on weather conditions, making tufa dams a likely source of information about past climatic conditions. Carthew and Drysdale demonstrated that it was possible to use information from the tufa deposits to construct a history of stream development in Davys Creek. Both these papers illustrate the scientific potential of the geoheritage features at Cliefden Caves.

== Thermal Spring ==
A thermal spring is located on the Belubula River near the caves. It is only one of three thermal springs associated with karst in NSW. It was first recorded by Wilkinson in 1892, and an analysis of the water appears in a report by Oliver Trickett in 1908. Warm springs rising from Palaeozoic rock (as opposed to those from the Australian Basin) are rare in NSW, with only three documented, all in karst areas. These are the Cliefden Warm Spring, a warm spring at Wee Jasper and the warm spring at Yarrangobilly Caves. There has been little study of warm springs in NSW.Despite assertions to the contrary, the Cliefden Thermal Spring is not on private property and is accessed via a public road.

== Threat from Dam ==
Proposals for water storages on the Belubula River date back more than half a century. Sites exist between Carcoar and Canowindra and several of these would adversely affect Cliefden Caves and surrounding areas. The site most mentioned is at The Needles, where the river has cut a narrow gap through a resistant zone of conglomerates, quartzite and sandstones. Any dam at this site, only 2.5 km from the caves, would inundate most of the known caves, the thermal spring, most of the fossil sites, and large areas of the rich alluvial agricultural flats (see map at Dam Proposals).

The NSW Government enacted State Heritage protection for the area in August 2017.

== Heritage listing ==
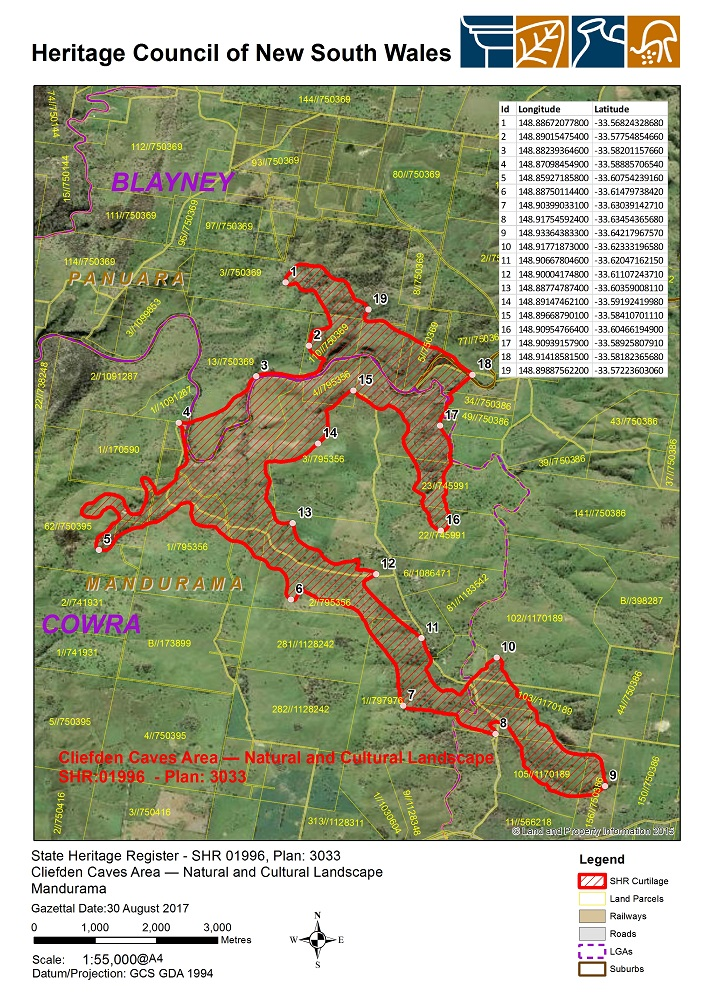
Heritage boundaries for the natural and cultural landscape

The Cliefden Caves Area is of state significance for its importance in the geological evolution of NSW. The area provides evidence of a lithological/sedimentological sequence that contributes to the understanding of the geological evolution of eastern Australia at a time when that part of the continent was submerged in the palaeo-Pacific Ocean.

The area contains the best exposures of Late Ordovician island marine invertebrate fossil assemblages in Australia and is recognised, internationally, as an outstanding example of an Ordovician island faunal (shelly fossils) and floral (algae) assemblage. The fossil evidence is a record of rich biodiversity and includes several fossil species such as the Belubula spectacula that do not occur anywhere else in the world.

The Cliefden Caves karst system is one of the most cavernous limestone areas in New South Wales and contains 67 recorded caves with more than 120 karst features identified, including well-developed caves, dolines, tufa deposits and a rare thermal spring. The caves contain numerous and diverse speleothems, including extensive arrays of helictites, large dogtooth spar crystals, rare blue speleothems and "boxwork" ceilings in addition to more commonly found speleothems such as stalagmites, stalactites, shawls and flowstone.

The area is important for its social values, being spiritually significant to Waradjuri traditional owners who continue to visit the site for ritual purposes and cultural obligations to the land. It is also highly regarded by scientific and speleological organisations and individuals, both in Australia and internationally.

The Cliefden Caves Area is the subject of current, ongoing research in the areas of palaeontology, karst processes, climate change, geology, hydrology and archaeology, contributing to an understanding of the natural history of NSW.

Skeletal remains located within the caves provide evidence of human occupation more than 6,000 years before the present day. Together with a number of carved trees in the area, they have the potential to yield information on pre-European cultural history.

Cliefden Caves is historically significant as the site of the first discovery of limestone in mainland Australia by surveyor G.W. Evans in 1815. The remnant structures known as 'Rothery's Ruins', located on Island Flat are associated with the Cliefden Estate and have the potential to yield further information on the functioning and significance of the Cliefden Estate.

Cliefden Caves Area - Natural and Cultural Landscape was listed on the New South Wales State Heritage Register on 30 August 2017 having satisfied the following criteria.

The place is important in demonstrating the course, or pattern, of cultural or natural history in New South Wales.

Natural

The Belubula Valley and Cliefden Caves area is important in the geological evolution of NSW in preserving the development and decline of a volcanic island succession, which is a rarely preserved and relatively short-lived phenomenon in the geological timescale. Limestones deposited in the Cliefden Caves area over a period of 5 million years, and the contact of the limestone with the underlying volcanics, provides evidence of a lithological/sedimentological sequence that contributes to the understanding of the geological evolution of eastern Australia when the eastern third of the continent was largely submerged in the palaeo-Pacific Ocean. The area contains well-preserved geomorphic evidence for uplift and valley incision, and the caves record the evolution of the area's hydrogeology.

The Cliefden Caves - Belubula River Valley contains the best exposures of Late Ordovician island marine invertebrate fossil assemblages in Australia and is recognised, internationally, as an outstanding example of an Ordovician island faunal (shelly fossils) and floral (algae) assemblage.

Fossil Hill, Dunhill Bluff and Trilobite Hill are recognised as icons of Australia's palaeontological heritage, having well-preserved shell, coral, and trilobite-bearing strata. The fossil evidence is a record of a rich biodiversity in this area, with 191 genera and 263 species of fossils documented in the vicinity. Several fossil species, such as the trimerellide brachiopod Belubula spectacula do not occur anywhere else in the world. The fossils record also defines biogeographic affinities in places that are now quite remote from each other, for example, the genus Belubula is found only in Cliefden and Zhuhuia in South China, providing evidence that during the Ordovician period these regions were situated far closer together than their present geographic setting, having separated as a result of subsequent plate tectonic movement.

The Cliefden Caves karst system is one of the most cavernous limestone areas in New South Wales, containing over 100 recorded caves. The system contains an extensive range of karst features, including caves, dolines, tufa deposits and a warm (thermal) spring. The caves contain numerous and diverse speleothems, including helictites, large dogtooth spar crystals, blue speleothems and "boxwork" ceilings in addition to more commonly found speleothems such as stalagmites, stalactites, shawls and flowstone. The speleothems at Cliefden range in colour from clear through pure white, yellow to orange and several rare formations of sky-blue and aqua green.

Cultural

The Belubula Valley, as part of the Lachlan River system, was home to the Wiradjuri language group of the Aboriginal people where they existed as hunters and fishers until around the 1830s when early European settlement began along the rivers.

Aboriginal skeletal remains in one of the caves, along with a number of carved trees in the vicinity, indicate the presence of Aboriginal people from at least 6000 years ago.

Cliefden Caves is the site of the first discovery of limestone in mainland Australia(Oxley, 1820 in Webby and Packham, 1982).

The Cliefden Caves area and the Belubula Valley have been the focus of study and visitation by the international scientific community to research the fossil beds and by speleological groups to map the caves and record their distinctive speleothems.

The remnant structures known as 'Rothery's Ruins', located on Island Flat, are associated with the SHR-listed Cliefden Estate and have the potential to yield further information on the functioning and significance of the Cliefden Estate.

The place has strong or special association with a particular community or cultural group in New South Wales for social, cultural or spiritual reasons.

The Wiradjuri traditional owners of the Cliefden Caves Area value the place as part of the broader Lachlan River and Mount Canobolas landscape, significant in Wiradjuri lore as a creation place and considered to be sacred and powerful, being imbued with the spirits of their ancestors.

The caves, in particular, have special significance to traditional ceremonial practice and beliefs, as a place of reverence for certain spiritual beings. The Wiradjuri people retain a strong connection to the place, using the caves for ritual purposes, visiting the hot spring, collecting coloured ochres and fishing for native species in the Belubula River. Connection with the place allows continued cultural practice and the carrying out of responsibility and obligation to the land. It is important to the community's sense of place, cultural preservation and community wellbeing.

The place is also highly regarded by caving organisations and by karst and fossil scientists, both in Australia and internationally. The high level of interest in the site is demonstrated by the overwhelming support for its listing.

The place has potential to yield information that will contribute to an understanding of the cultural or natural history of New South Wales.

Natural

The Cliefden Caves Limestone Group is the subject of current, ongoing research in the areas of paleontology, karst processes, climate change, geology, hydrology and archaeology. It is an outstanding resource with the potential for research in all these areas of study to contribute to an understanding of the natural history of NSW.

The region has been the subject of several palaeontological field excursions associated with major international scientific conferences held in Sydney and Orange over the past three decades. As a direct result of these field trips, ongoing collaborative research projects into various aspects of the fossils from this area have been established between NSW palaeontologists and those from China and the Czech Republic.

The well-preserved geomorphic evidence of the Belubula Valley and the Cliefden Caves record of the area's hydrogeology, have the potential to yield further information on the landscape evolution of the Eastern Highlands.

Mud deposits in the caves contain minerals that contain a record of past environments. Tufa Dams on Davy's Creek hold evidence of past climate events.

The Cliefden Caves and Belubula Valley are considered a bat "hot spot", with over fifteen species of bats identified in the area and two species inhabiting the caves year round - The Eastern Bentwing Bat (Miniopterus schreibersii) which is listed as "Vulnerable" under the NSW TSC Act (1995); and the Eastern Horseshoe bat (Rhinolophus megaphyllus). The extremely high level of microbat activity and species richness in Cliefden Caves and the Belubula Valley has the potential to yield information on microbats.

Cultural

Skeletal remains provide evidence of human occupation more than 6,000 years before the present day. Together with a number of carved trees in the area, they have the potential to yield information on pre-European cultural history.

The place possesses uncommon, rare or endangered aspects of the cultural or natural history of New South Wales.

Ordovician rocks in the Cliefden area contain many fossils unique to Australia and occasionally unknown elsewhere in the world, such as the brachiopod species Belubula spectacula. Particularly significant specimens include the world's oldest known in-situ brachiopod shell beds (from Fossil Hill), the earliest rugose corals found anywhere on Earth (also from Fossil Hill), well-preserved trilobite fossils (Trilobite Hill), and an exceptionally diverse deep-water sponge assemblage (Coppermine Creek and Gleesons Creek localities, both tributaries of the Belubula River).

The thermal spring is a rare feature, as one of only three thermal springs associated with Karst in NSW. The tufa dams are also uncommon in NSW in being active, i.e., continually forming with new deposits.

Mud deposits in the caves contain unusual minerals.

Blue speleothems such as the pale blue flowstone in Taplow Maze Cave and azure blue stalactites in Boonderoo and Murder Cave are exceptionally rare in Australia.

The place is important in demonstrating the principal characteristics of a class of cultural or natural places/environments in New South Wales.

Cliefden Caves demonstrates a broad range of karst characteristics and ranks as one of the most diverse cave groups in NSW.
