= Junction Reefs Dam =

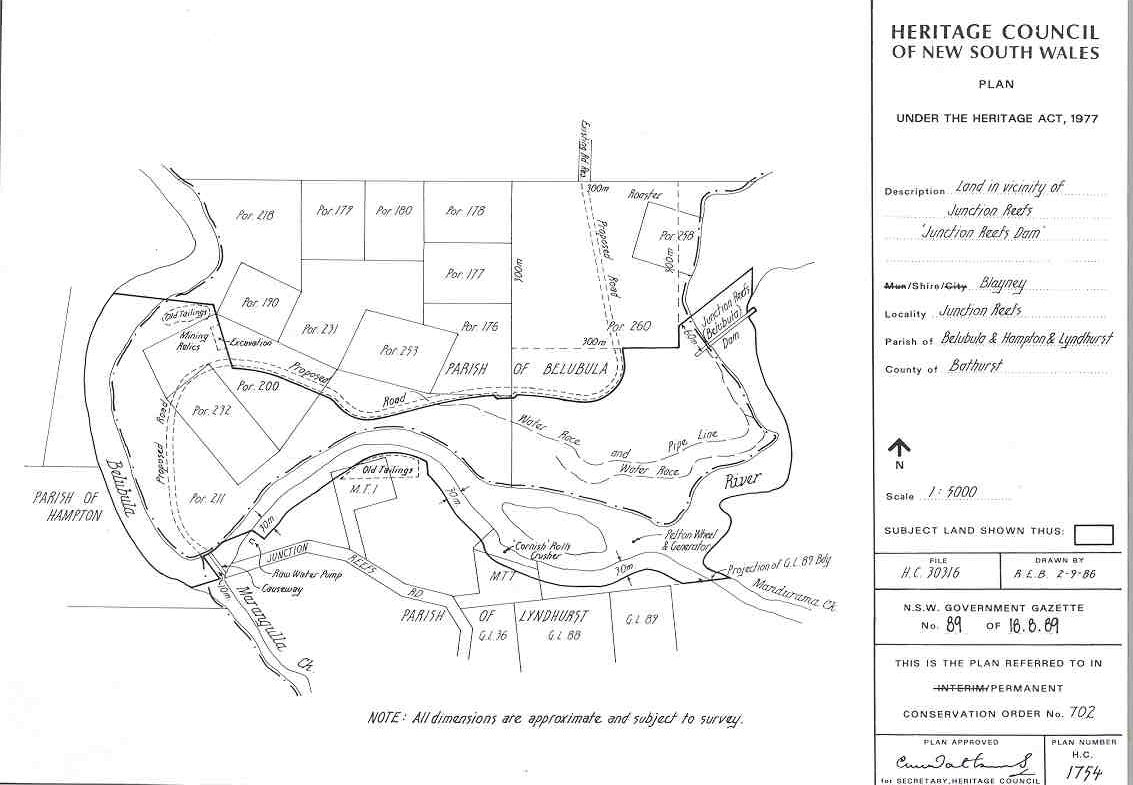
- Heritage boundaries

- Location within New South Wales
- Country: Australia
- Location: Belubula River, Lyndhurst, Blayney Shire, New South Wales, Australia
- Coordinates: 33°37′13″S 148°59′31″E
- Construction began: 1896
- Opening date: 1897
- Designed by: Oscar Shulze
- Owner: Lyndhurst G M Co

Dam and spillways
- Impounds: Belubula River

Site notes
- Owner: Department of Planning and Infrastructure

New South Wales Heritage Register
- Official name: Junction Reefs Dam, Land in the vicinity of; Belubula Dam
- Type: state heritage (landscape)
- Designated: 2 April 1999
- Reference no.: 00702
- Type: Historic Landscape
- Category: Landscape - Cultural
- Builders: Oscar Shulze

Junction Reefs Dam is a heritage-listed former mining dam on the Belubula River at Lyndhurst in the Central West region of New South Wales, Australia. It was designed by Oscar Shulze and built by Schulze in 1896. It was the first multi-arch dam built in Australia. It is also known as Belubula Dam. The property is owned by Department of Planning and Infrastructure (State Government). It was added to the New South Wales State Heritage Register on 2 April 1999.

== History ==
The Junction Reefs area on the Belubula River near Mandurama has been the site of intermittent gold production since 1870. Belubula Dam was built in 1896 in a deep narrow ravine at an altitude of about 61m above the crushing mill and was completed in nine months. It was built with day labour about 40 men strong under the personal supervision of the eminent civil engineer Oscar Schulze.

This arched dam was the first of its type constructed in Australia and Schulze was one of the few Australian visionaries. He advocated improved windmills and waterwheels for heavy industry and campaigned against the use of steam gas and petroleum engines when alternative energy was available. Junction Reefs Dam and its hydro system gave him the opportunity to demonstrate his theories and apply them to the mining industry.

After the dam was completed he delivered a paper to the Australian Institute of Mining Engineers at Melbourne in 1897. He elaborated on his theory and enunciated how the final design for the dam evolved. The brick buttress was the accepted design as it was the cheapest of the furable designed and was the quickest to build. Good brickmakers clay was on the northern bank adjacent to the dam site. Once built the water backed up the river 2 kilometres and impounded 2ml and would keep the machinery running for three months if the river ever stopped running, which seldom happened.

== Description ==
The dimensions of the Belubula Dam are as follows: its total length along the crest, including bye-wash, is 431 feet, which is not curved but straight on plan; the greatest height of the structure at the deepest foundation is 60 feet; the height of the brickwork 36 feet 9 inches; the height of the rugged contour of the bed rock.

As has already been stated there are six buttresses, 28 feet apart from the centre to centre, each 40 feet long, 12 feet wide on top at the end where they outer end. The front wall of the foundations increase slightly in thickness downwards. On top of these foundations the buttresses were carried up as brick-masonry, each forming a sextant of a circle of 36 feet 2 inches radius and decreasing in thickness from the centre towards the circumference from 8 feet 6 inches to 4 feet.

These buttresses serve as piers for the support of five brick arches of elliptical shape which decrease in thickness upwards, from 4 feet thick at the foot to 1 foot 7 inches on top, and have a lean of 60 degree. The spandrils between these arches were faced flush with concrete which covers the crown of the arches were faced flush with concrete which covers the crown of the arches 12 inches thick, thus making the arches 2 feet 7 inches thick at the thinnest part. On each side of this central portion of the dam the ground rises, and the wall was continued about 100 feet long, up and into the hill sides to firm rock faces, as concrete masonry, with the same batter of 60 degree in front (that is on the water side) as the arches part, but almost vertical at the back, the width on top being 2 feet.

The whole of the dam proper measures thus 347 feet in length and shows a straight, uniformly battered, cemented face on the water side, while the back is ribbed, and shows five chambers under the overhanging arches between the buttresses. A bye-wash was constructed in the extension of the dam on the east side, 65 feet wide, divided into five sluice openings, and a wing wall was built on rock foundation to lead the water away clear of the dam. Allowance was also made for occasional extreme flood waters to run over the dam between the buttresses. The race which was left open during construction, being arched over, will serve permanently as an emergency outlet, for which purpose a projection was built out form the main wall with a 5 feet well in it, through which the reservoir can be emptied to the level of the service pipe, into the gorge. This well is usually kept closed by a wooden lid 12 inches in thickness, which can be raised by means of a hydraulic ram of 50 tons power, worked by a pump placed at the back of the wall. The service outlet was carried through the main wall by a 24-inch cast- iron pipe, the entrance of which was formed by a tapering and rising brick culvert. The vertical opening of that culvert, together with that of the emergency outlet and of two 6 inch flushing pipes, is enclosed by a wooden grating built in the shape of a step roof and surrounded by a sediment basin, which was formed by building an earth dam across the river bed above the dam, which, during the construction, served for diverting the river from the work as required.

The dam contains in its construction about 6000 yards of concrete and 500,000 bricks, together with which 5000 casks of cement were used. The comparatively small amount of cement is accounted for by the fact that large boulders were placed in the concrete wherever practicable to the extent of one-fifth to one third of its bulk. The total cost of the dam was under 9000. In order to secure the reservoir against gradual silting up, it will be necessary to construct a cribwork across the valley at its upper end, for which purpose a number of she-oak trees were left standing there in the river bed and they will serve as supports for the cribwork. All the other timber in the area of the reservoir was cleared away.

The physical condition of the dam was reported as good as at 1 July 1998. Although the water body storage is mainly silted up the dam wall is in excellent condition. 102 years after construction (especially after restoration works complete). Remains of associated mining machinery survive in the vicinity.

The Dam is located on Crown Land currently under the control of the Canobolas Regional Reserve Park Trust. It is to be hoped that when the current mining lease expires the reserve can be opened to the public under the care of (a live on site) caretaker. There is potential to establish a viable mining visitor centre in conjunction with picnic grounds changing an entry fee for maintenance works.

== Heritage listing ==
Industrial archaeology in Australia provides an important record of the occupations and commercial activity of European incomers from the earliest days of settlement to the present. Looking at industrial archaeological sites can provide insight into events which shaped the development and characteristics of this area of NSW. The Central Western Region was one of the first major inland areas of NSW to be settled and its archaeological sites provide a physical adjunct to the historical record. This is particularly true of the industrial remains, through which the process of transfer and adaptation of English technologies to Australian conditions can be documented.

Junction Reefs Dam was built as a direct result of the gold rush in this area. Its purpose was to provide hydropower to allow gold extraction to continue in the Lyndhurst goldfield on a more constant basis. Gold rushes had an enormous effect on the landscape, where ever they happened; from the physical appearance of the surrounding environment, to the increase of capital, in terms of both personal and public profit and expenditure on infrastructure and buildings, to the establishment and demise of communities.

Junction Reefs Dam was the first multi-arched dam to be built in Australia, in 1897 and is unique to New South Wales.

Junction Reefs Dam is assessed as being of high state significance.

Junction Reefs Dam was listed on the New South Wales State Heritage Register on 2 April 1999 having satisfied the following criteria.

The place is important in demonstrating the course, or pattern, of cultural or natural history in New South Wales.

From a civil engineering point of view it is highly significant as the first multi-arch dam built in Australia. From a mining engineering aspect it is historically significant where hydro power was converted to mechanical power in processing ore.

The place is important in demonstrating aesthetic characteristics and/or a high degree of creative or technical achievement in New South Wales.

The dam is aesthetically significant because of the graceful design utilising arches and brick curved buttresses.

The place has strong or special association with a particular community or cultural group in New South Wales for social, cultural or spiritual reasons.

The designer was a visionary who appreciated the value of alternative energy sources i.e.; hydro power versus expensive non renewable coal, wood or oil powered systems. He was strong willed enough to proceed with his ideas even though criticised by his fellow engineers.

The place has potential to yield information that will contribute to an understanding of the cultural or natural history of New South Wales.

It has the potential to reveal information about dam building techniques and the utilisation of hydro power versus steam, oil/diesel power.

The place possesses uncommon, rare or endangered aspects of the cultural or natural history of New South Wales.

The dam is unique to NSW, and was the first of its type built in Australia.

The place is important in demonstrating the principal characteristics of a class of cultural or natural places/environments in New South Wales.

The dam forms part of the classic history of development and advancement in mining engineering technology in the area and for all Australia.

== Engineering heritage award ==
The dam received an Engineering Heritage National M'arker from Engineers Australia as part of its Engineering Heritage Recognition Program.
