= F. R. C. Hopkins =

Australian writer

Francis Rawdon Chesney Hopkins (c. 1849 – 20 July 1916) was an Australian pastoralist and playwright, born in India.

== History ==
Hopkins was born on Colaba, Bombay, B9mbay Presidency, British India to Francis William Hopkins, RN, and Margaret Hopkins, née McNeil, and was educated in England. He was a cousin of General Sir George Chesney and Colonel Charles Chesney (authors of Battle of Dorking and Lee's Campaigns in Virginia and Maryland respectively), and nephew of Francis Rawdon Chesney.

Hopkins left England for Australia around 1865, and worked for his uncle John Wilson, brother of Sir Samuel Wilson, at "Woodlands" near Crowlands, Victoria in the Wimmera district of Victoria, 1866–1871. He managed Toorangabby station near Echuca 1871–1875 and others of Sir Samuel Wilson's properties. In 1877 he was managing nearby Pericoota station, with its magnificent two-storey homestead, for Robertson and Wagner. In 1885, in partnership with Alexander Wilson (another brother of Sir Samuel) he purchased Errowanbang station near Carcoar, New South Wales, where he bred hybrid sheep from Havilah Merino ewes and Romney Marsh rams. It is reckoned his run could have reached something like 40,000 sheep.

In 1889 Hopkins, with Wilson and Charles Hebden (1851–1915), purchased Coubil and Welbondongah stations in the Gwydir Shire in New South Wales, but did not leave Errowanbang.

=== Writing ===
Hopkins found time to exercise his talent for writing, creating a number of works that critics found stimulating, including two collections of short stories, Birds of Passage and The Opium Runner. The second volume got its title from his story of a smuggler who built a submarine vessel to carry his contraband cargo. He wrote the plays All for Gold or Fifty Millions of Money, based on Eugène Sue's, Wandering Jew, and staged by Alfred Dampier, Phil K. Walsh and others, Reaping the Whirlwind: an Australian patriotic drama for Australian people and All for Love. He also wrote The Confessions of a Cynic, "the outcome of many years' observation of bush social life".

For many years he was reviewer and theatre critic for The Pastoral Review.

=== Other interests ===
Hopkins took no part in party politics, but

- His support helped the "Church and Schools Act" to get passed by the Carruthers government.
- He was chairman of the Carcoar Pastures Protection Board and a founder of the Pastoralists' Union.
- He was a generous supporter of patriotic causes
- He was a member of the Australia Day Fund committee.

=== Death ===
On the morning of 20 July 1916 Hopkins set out on horseback to inspect his flock, and when he failed to return by lunchtime an employee set out and found the horse hitched to a tree and Hopkins dead nearby, drowned in a disused mine shaft. His coat and hat were nearby. It was assumed he was investigating ways to prevent his sheep entering the shaft, when he lost his footing and accidentally fell in and either lost consciousness or could not escape.

Hopkins, long regarded as a confirmed bachelor, on 8 January 1884 married Sarah Jane Kennedy (c. 1858 – 13 April 1943). He was survived by his wife and a son, Rawdon Chesney Hopkins, who continued management of Errowanbang station.

== Published work ==
- The Confessions of a Cynic (1882)
- Gum Leaves Old and Gum Leaves New William Brooks and Co., Ltd., Sydney (1907) verses published anonymously
- Birds of Passage (1908)
- The Opium Runner Websdale, Shoosmith, Ltd., Sydney. (1909) short stories

Non-fiction

- The Animal Parasites of Sheep Turner and Henderson (1892) Australian edition of a US standard work by Cooper Curtice.

Plays, first performance

- Good for Evil, 1870
- All for Gold, 1877
- Only a Fool, 1880
- L. S. D. or One of the Crowd 1883
- Russia, As It Is 1884
- Reaping the Whirlwind, 1909, published anonymously
- All for Love
