= Thomas Icely =

Australian politician

Thomas Icely MLC
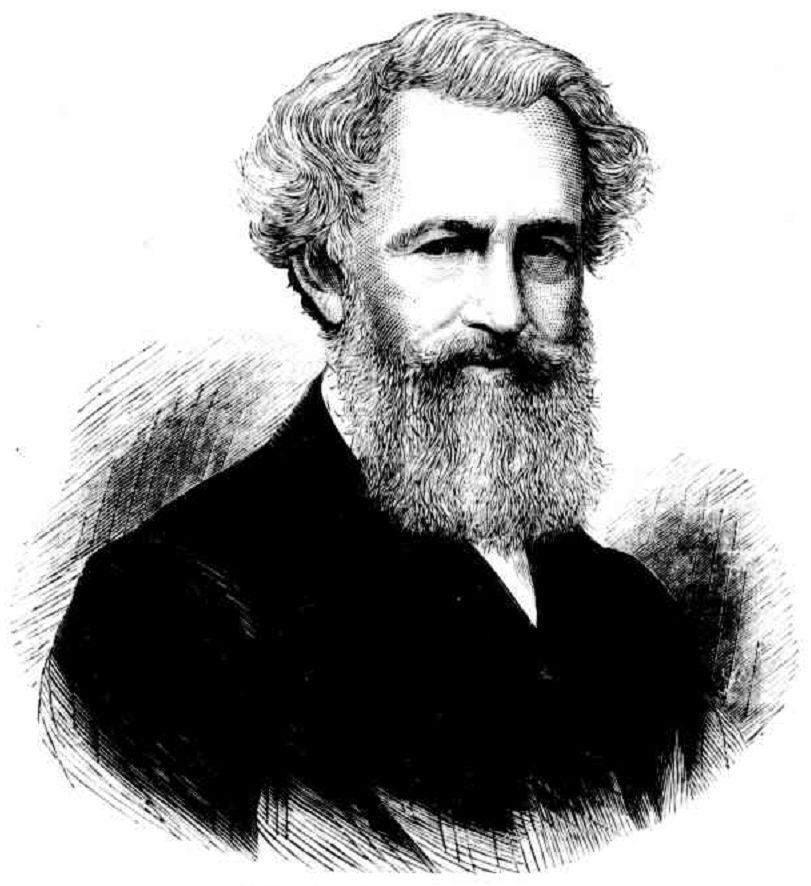
- Portrait of Thomas Icely published with his obituary in Australian Town and Country Journal (New South Wales), 28 February 1874
- Born: 3 November 1797; Plympton, Devonshire, England
- Died: 13 February 1874 (aged 76); Parramatta, New South Wales

Thomas Icely (3 November 1797 – 13 February 1874) was an early colonial New South Wales landholder and stockbreeder. As a nominee Legislative Councillor from 1843, to 1853, and from 1855, until the establishment of responsible government in 1856, he was a consistent supporter of the Governor. He served a second term as a life appointee to the Legislative Council from 1864.

Icely was the beneficiary of large land grants to which he added purchased land holdings, his main holding from 1831 was Coombing Park. To support this holding, the village of Mandurama was established in 1876. Thomas Icely was a benefactor of the Anglican Church in Carcoar where he funded the building of St Paul's church in Belubula St. Designed by Edmund Blacket, a small gothic revival structure and build of brick and sandstone with a slate roof between 1845 and 1848 making it the second oldest church west of the Blue Mountains.

His name is associated with the introduction of Shorthorn stock into Australia. The year 1831 was a milestone in that it saw the first Beef Shorthorn bull registered in Coates’ Herd Book brought to Australia. The importer was the Van Diemen's Land Company, Tasmania. There is some confusion as to which breeder imported the first Coates’ Herd Book bull to the mainland. Expert opinion leans towards Mr Thomas Icely of Coombing Park, Carcour, New South Wales who imported a red bull in the mid-1830s.

He was the first lessee of Elizabeth Farm to which he retired with his family in 1869 and where he died on 13 February 1874.
