= Lyndhurst, New South Wales =

Lyndhurst
- Town
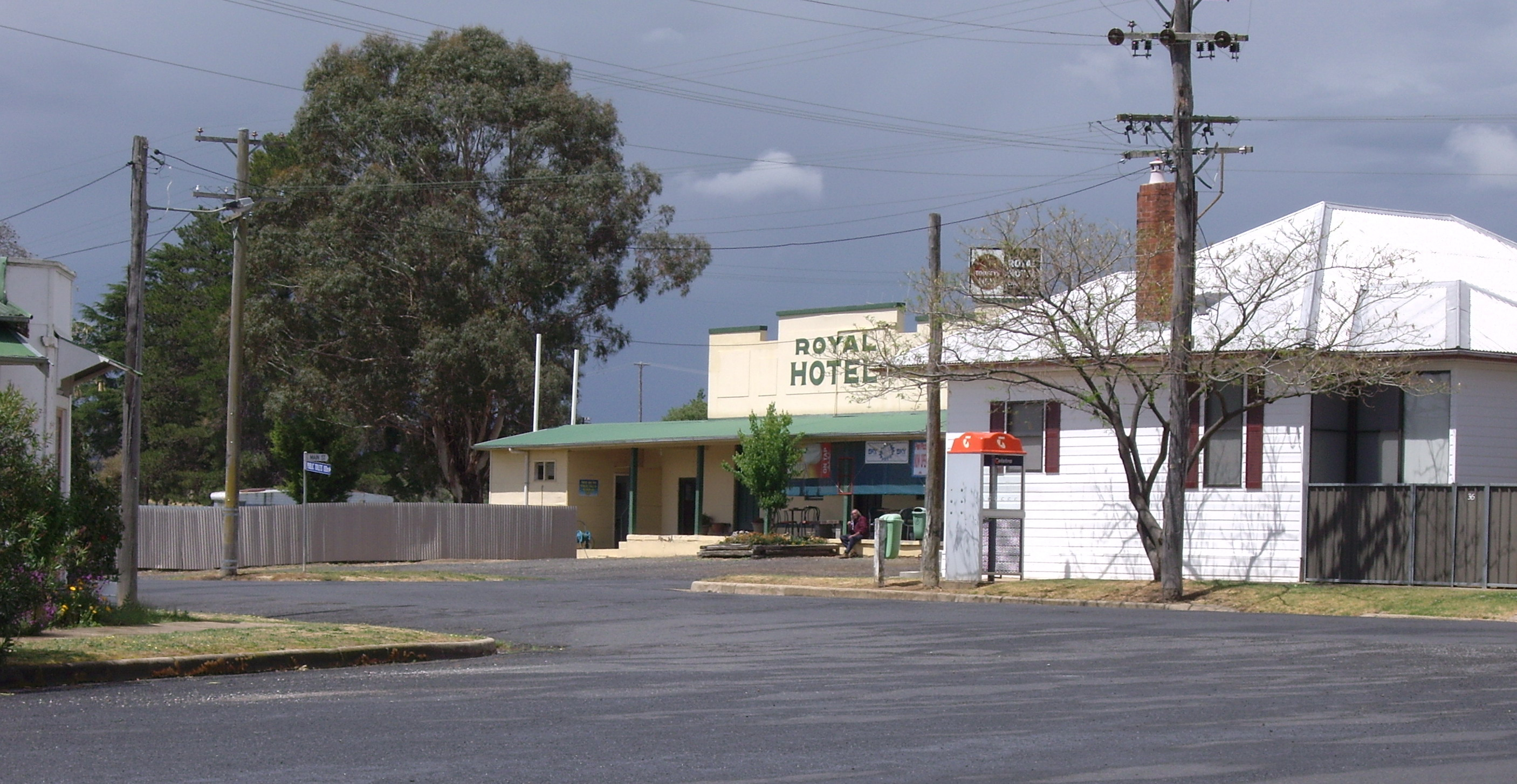
- Lyndhurst with Royal Hotel in the background

- Coordinates: 33°40′S 149°02′E
- Country: Australia
- State: New South Wales
- LGA: Blayney Shire
- Location: 269 km (167 mi) from Sydney; 63 km (39 mi) from Bathurst

Government
  - State electorate: Bathurst
  - Federal division: Calare
- Elevation: 671 m (2,201 ft)

Population
  - Total: 267 (2016 census)
- Postcode: 2797

Lyndhurst is a small village in New South Wales, Australia in Blayney Shire. It is 4 kilometres west of Mandurama or about 269 km west of Sydney and 63 km south-west of Bathurst just off the Mid-Western Highway New South Wales. Once serving as the major centre for basic goods and needs to the nearby Junction Reefs goldfields. At the 2021 census, Lyndhurst had a population of 359 people.

Lyndhurst was one of the ten areas (including Albury, Armidale, Bombala, Dalgety, Lake George, Orange, Tooma, Tumut and Canberra) shortlisted in 1908 as sites for the national capital.

== Lyndhurst today ==
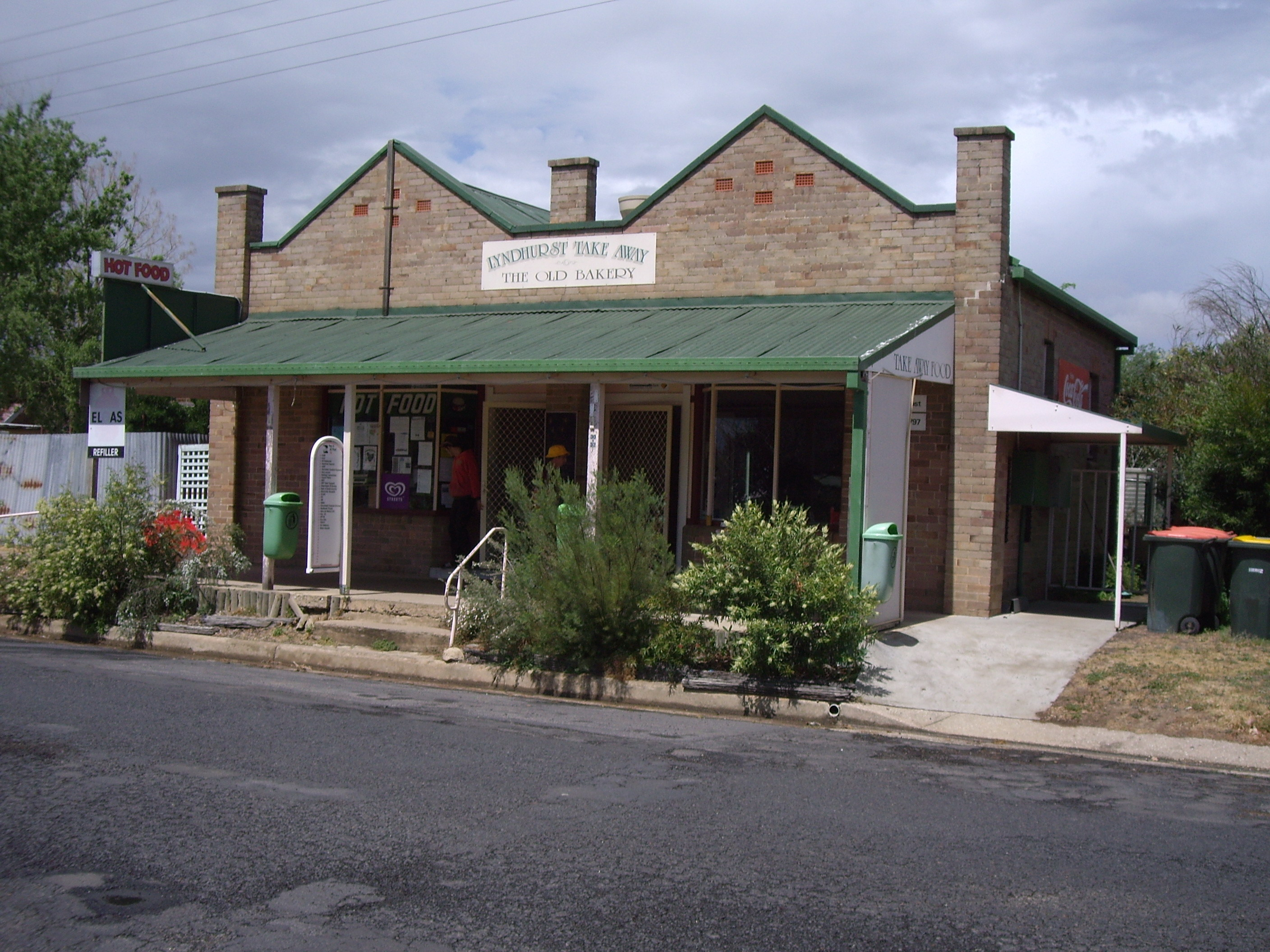
Lyndhurst General Store

Lyndhurst today boasts the still functioning Royal Hotel, a public school, a Golf Club, a combined service station/general store and a takeaway.

== Heritage listings ==
Lyndhurst has a number of heritage-listed sites, including:

- Belubula River: Junction Reefs Dam
