= Coombing Park =

Farming property in Australia

Coordinates: 33°38′S 149°07′E

Coombing Park is a farming property situated in western New South Wales just off the Mid-Western Highway about 5 km west of Carcoar, 260 km west of Sydney and 54 km south-west of Bathurst. The property is of considerable note because of its relationship with convicts, bushrangers and the Cobb & Co coaching company. The property was offered as an estate to its owner Thomas Icely by the early New South Wales Government in 1826. It was one of the first estates created on the western side of the Blue Mountains that border the area of Sydney.

== History ==
Thomas Icely enlisted (not of their own free-will) the help of 62 convicts to build the original homestead and outbuildings between 1838 and 1842 and indeed the original shearing shed and stables are still standing from their construction date of 1848.

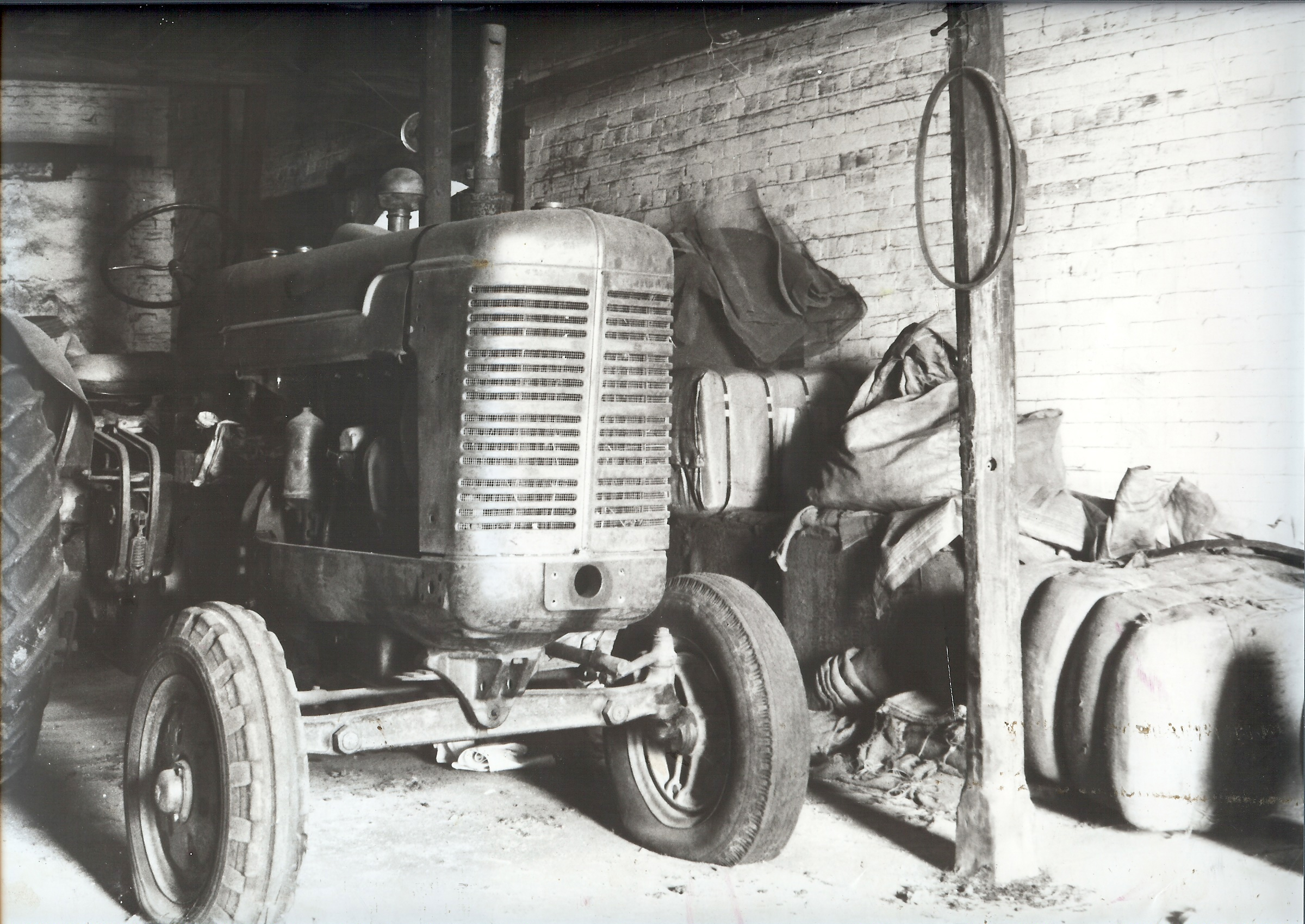
Coombing Park - inside stable built in 1848

The eastern boundary of the property borders the Mt Macquarie road which leads directly to the town Carcoar, which was specifically created in 1839 so as to service the Coombing Park estate and is situated about 1 kilometre away. The town required the presence of about 27 Mounted and Foot Police, specifically with the aim of controlling the frequent appearance of bushrangers in the area. One notorious bushranger directly related with the Coombing Park property was Mickey Burke who shot and wounded an employee of Coombing Park whilst he was stealing a racehorse from the stables.

Thomas Icely's original cottage was replaced by a large single storey but elegant brick villa that was designed and built by G.A. Mansfield in 1900. This was some 20 years after the property had been purchased in 1881 by the Cobb & Co coaching company and occupied by a partner of the Cobb & Co firm, a Mr William Franklin Whitney. Whitney's descendants still own and live on the property. It retains much Cobb & Co memorabilia.

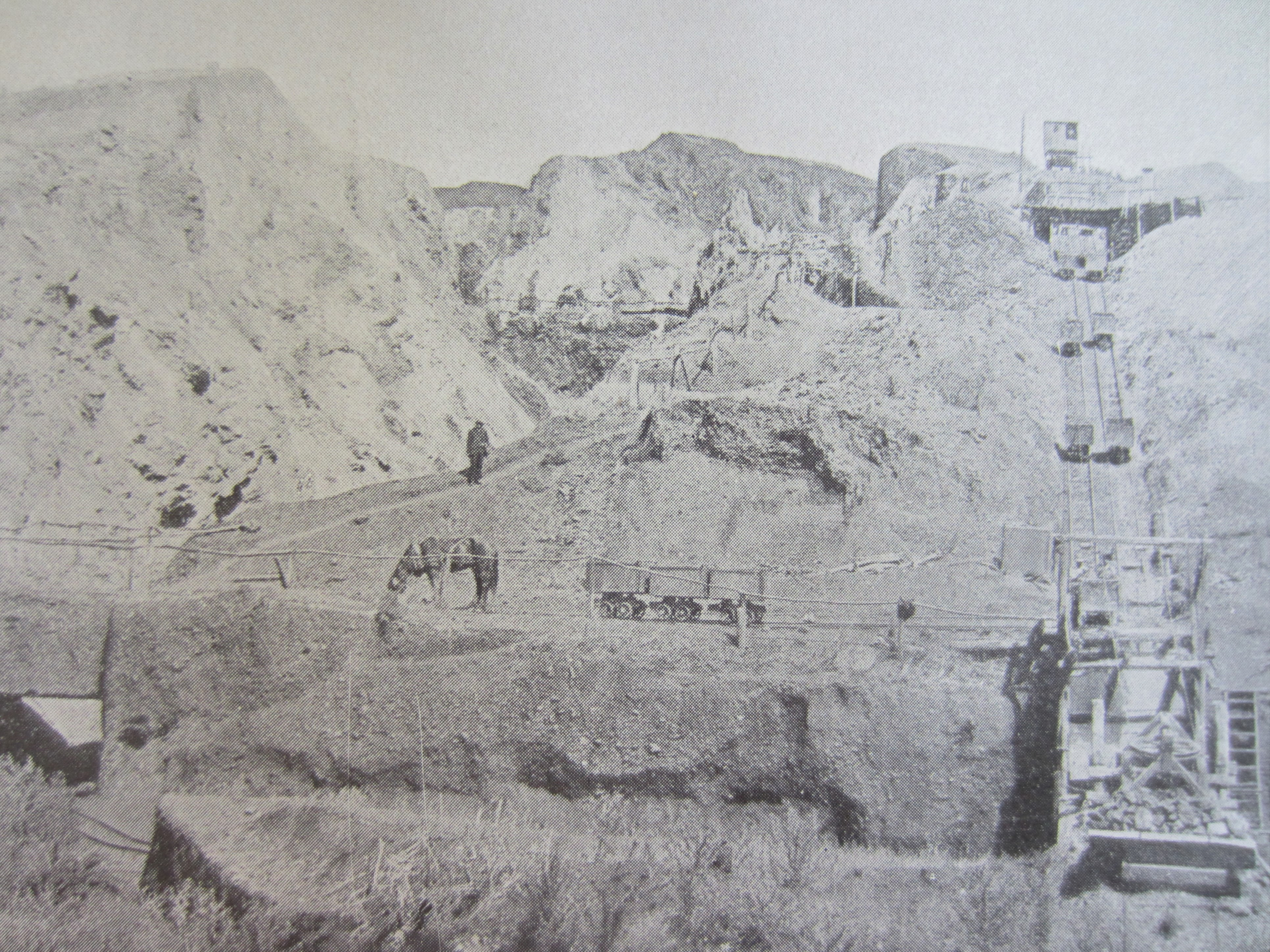
Iron ore quarry at Coombing Park, c.1923.

Thomas Icely had identified the presence of copper ore close to the homestead, as early as 1847. He had shafts—referred to as the Coombing Mine—sunk to mine the lode from 1848 to 1851. In 1875, this mine was reopened—by Lewis Lloyd and Saul Samuel—and, in 1876, a copper smelter was built close to it. A separate location on the property—about 2 km south-east of the homestead, close to the modern-day Fell Timber Road—was, from 1876 to 1878, the site of the Geraldine copper mine.

There was a quarry on the property, which provided iron ore from around 1899, for use as flux at the Cockle Creek Smelter. Later and more significantly, it provided ore—around 500,000 tons—for the Lithgow Blast Furnace, from late April 1907 up to May 1923, when the lease expired and was not renewed. This second ore mining operation included a railway line, 1¼ miles in length, connecting the quarry to the Blayney–Demondrille railway line south of Carcoar. The iron ore quarry was located south of Coombing Creek and just west of modern-day Fell Timber Road. The formation of the former railway line remains discernible in aerial views.

== Holistic management ==
The property is still a working farm. Once on the verge of ruin, with severe land degradation, the farm was turned around using Allan Savory's holistic management farming techniques, where the livestock are grouped together and herded to mimic the migrations in nature of herds of wild herbivores.
