= Australia at the Winter Olympics =

- IOC code: AUS
- NOC: Australian Olympic Committee
- Website: www.olympics.com.au
- Medals Ranked 25th: Gold 9 Silver 9 Bronze 7 Total 25

Winter Olympics appearances (overview)
- 1936; 1948; 1952; 1956; 1960; 1964; 1968; 1972; 1976; 1980; 1984; 1988; 1992; 1994; 1998; 2002; 2006; 2010; 2014; 2018; 2022; 2026

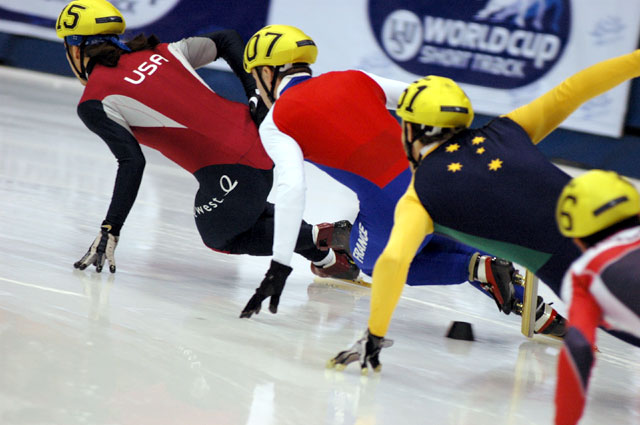
Short track speed skater Mark McNee, third from left at the 2004 World Cup in Saguenay. His uniform features the green and gold and the Southern Cross

Australia first competed in the Winter Olympic Games in 1936 in Garmisch-Partenkirchen, and has participated in every games since, with the exception of the 1948 Games in St. Moritz.

In the early years, Australia's athletes did poorly; only two athletes placed in the top half of their events before 1976, while the vast majority placed in the bottom quarter, including some who finished last. This lack of success was attributed to the Australian culture, climate and lack of snow, as well as the lack of support for the athletes—sports administrators regarded investment in winter sports as futile.

After the appointment of Geoff Henke—who had been unable to compete in 1956 after the administrators neglected to endorse his ice hockey team's application—as team manager in 1976, the results slowly began to improve, and by the 1990s, some Australians were regarded as medal prospects. The upturn in performance was accompanied by increased government funding for winter sports, the creation of the Olympic Winter Institute of Australia and the purchase of an alpine training base in Austria.

Australia won its first medal, a bronze, in 1994 in the men's 5,000 metres short track relay speed skating event. Zali Steggall gained Australia's first individual medal in 1998, when she won bronze in the slalom event. In 2002, Steven Bradbury won the 1,000 metres short track speed skating and Alisa Camplin won the aerials event, making Australia the only southern hemisphere country to have won a gold medal at a Winter Olympics until 2022.

Australia sent 40 competitors to compete in 10 sports at the 2006 Games in Turin. Their goal of winning a medal was achieved when Dale Begg-Smith won the gold in men's freestyle moguls skiing. Camplin claimed her second medal, a bronze in the aerials event.

At the 2010 Games in Vancouver Australia had its most successful Winter Olympics at the time taking home two gold and one silver medal. Begg-Smith won a silver in the moguls, while Torah Bright and Lydia Lassila won the women's half-pipe snowboarding and aerial freestyle skiing respectively.

At the 2014 Games, Australia sent its largest ever Winter Olympic Team, 60 athletes, to Sochi, competing in 10 sports. The Sochi Team included 31 female athletes making it the first Australian Olympic Team, Summer or Winter, with more female athletes than male. Australia again won three medals with David Morris (aerial skiing) and Torah Bright (snowboard halfpipe) winning silver and Lydia Lassila (aerial skiing) finishing with bronze.

In 2026 at the Milano Cortina Winter Olympics, moguls Olympic Champion Jakara Anthony won her second gold medal, simultaneously making her the most successful Australian Winter Olympian, and making 2026 Australia's most successful Olympic Winter Games - along with Cooper Woods' gold medal in moguls, Josie Baff's gold medal in snowboard cross, Matt Graham's bronze medal in dual moguls, Danielle Scott's silver medal in freestyle skiing aerials, and Scotty James' silver medal in snowboarding halfpipe (the latter making him Australia's first Olympian to win three medals at the Olympic Winter Games).

Overall Australia has won 25 Winter Olympic medals – 9 gold, 9 silver and 7 bronze.

== History ==
=== Early struggles ===
Winter sports have traditionally been second to summer pursuits in Australian sporting culture, but interest and support in the former has grown. The decision-making bodies of the Australian Olympic Federation (AOF) allowed winter sports to be represented, but their representatives were usually overruled by their summer counterparts.

The first Winter Olympics took place in 1924. Australia first competed at the Winter Olympics in 1936, when its sole representative, Kenneth Kennedy, participated in speed skating. Kennedy came 33rd in both the 1500 m and 5000 m, near the bottom of the standings. He was entirely on his own; no Australian support staff were in attendance, even though the AOF officially sanctioned Kennedy's entry.

The Olympics were then halted due to the outbreak of World War II. Australia did not send a team to the 1948 Winter Olympics, but has competed at every Winter Olympics since, sending nine athletes to the 1952 Olympics. There were five skiers, two cross-country and three downhill—who either failed to finish or whose results were unknown—three figure skaters and one speed skater. Adrian Swan and Nancy Burley, who finished 10th and 14th in figure skating, respectively, were the only two Australia competitors to place in the top 20, although neither placed in the top half of the field. Burley and fellow figure skater Gweneth Molony were the first two women to represent Australia at the Winter Olympics.

Supervision and support for the athletes were relatively minimal in the early years. Colin Hickey said that he never received clothing from the AOF, except for a black armband and tie for the 1952 Olympics to mourn the death of King George VI. He also said that Australian officials had "no control over me ... All they'd do was tell me what times I had to do". Hickey was uncoached and had travelled to Europe at the age of 18 to support himself and race. In 1952, a support staffer was present for the first time; Robert "George" Chisholm was the first manager of an Australian Winter Olympic team. The lack of administrative attention was highlighted when Chisholm incorrectly declared that the campaign was Australia's first at the Winter Olympics.

At the 1956 Winter Olympics, Hickey, a "rink rat" who was overlooked for ice hockey when he was young because of his small frame, came seventh in the 500 and 1000 metres speed skating at his second Olympics. He later won a bronze medal at the world championships. Australia's nine other competitors were less successful; two male figure skaters—Allan Ganter and Charles Keeble—placed in the top 15 but in the bottom 25% in the individual event, while the pairs combination of Mervyn Bower and Jacqueline Mason failed to take to the ice after Bower was injured. The five downhill skiers were Australia's least successful entrants; the highest finish was 33rd and the median was 60th, and all were near the bottom of their events. Australia sent its first coach and female staffer for the 1956 campaign; C. Mason oversaw the skaters and Lillian Chisholm acted as the chaperone. The ice hockey team offered to pay their own way to compete; the only thing that they needed from the AOF was formal permission. However, the AOF never responded to their request; they were unable to attend, and criticised the AOF for their lack of interest. One of the affected athletes was Geoff Henke, later credited for ending the neglect of winter sports when he became an administrator.

Australia sent 31 athletes in 1960, its largest team before the 2006 Winter Olympics; their size was boosted by an outclassed 18-man ice hockey team, which conceded 83 goals in losing all six matches. They lost to Czechoslovakia 18–1 and the United States 12–1 in their two group matches, and were then placed into a group with Finland and Japan, the last-placed teams in the two other preliminary groups. The Australians played two matches against each of the other teams to determine the three worst teams in the nine-country contest. They lost all four matches, conceding a total of 53 goals. Australia scored only 10 goals in reply.

Hal Nerdal competed in Nordic combined, the only time that Australia has participated in the event at the Olympics, and finished last. Four years after injury prevented them from competing, Bower and Mason recorded Australia's best result, placing 12th in the pairs figure skating, although they were still second to last. Hickey and two male figure skaters—who were close to last—were the only Australians to place in the top 20, while Christine Davy became the first Australian to break into the top 30 in a skiing event, although she too was in the bottom 20% of the competition. The athletes were accompanied by seven staff members, the largest Australian support contingent until 1988. Chisholm mistakenly noted in his official report that it was Australia's second participation, forgetting the delegations sent in 1936, 1952 and 1956.

With the ice hockey team in mind, there was debate about the trade-off between selection standards and participation after the 1960 Winter Olympics. At a 1963 meeting, Kenneth Kennedy complained that the ice hockey team was not given overseas trips to compete because they were not world class, but could never become competitive unless they had experience in international matches. Edgar Tanner said "I ask the winter sports whether they really believe they are in world class, or world ranking, in the field of sport and whether they can do Australia credit, or just be there." Bill Young, of cycling, disagreed, saying "I thought the first spirit of the Games was to compete", but was overruled by Tanner.

In contrast to the large 1960 team, the teams in subsequent Olympics were scaled back and were the smallest since 1936. The 1964 Winter Olympics were marred by the deaths of Australian skier Ross Milne—who crashed during a practice run. Milne had skidded off the course and crashed into a tree. Members of the IOC asked the AOF whether Milne was negligently sent to compete despite a lack of experience, which the AOF denied. The Australian manager John Wagner blamed the accident on a large group of skiers who had congregated lower down on the course during the practice session, forcing Milne to take evasive action. The Australian delegation felt that the training arrangements had not been enacted strictly, making the course unsafe. Australia was represented by five skiers—excluding Milne. Christine Smith placed in the top 30 in two events, but the remainder placed 40th or lower, although all were in the bottom half of the field. Milne's replacement Peter Wenzel placed 68th in both the downhill and giant slalom.

Motivated in part by a desire to prove that Australians could compete at the highest level, and believing that claims that his brother died due to inexperience was a smokescreen intended to cover-up the poor safety standards, Malcolm Milne represented Australia at the next two Winter Olympics, won a World Cup event and came third in a World Championship. In 1968, Milne finished 24th in both the downhill and slalom events, Australia's best result in a skiing event up to that point. Ross Martin came 60th in both cross-country events, and Colin Coates came 41st and 49th in his two speed skating events. Australia had more officials present than athletes, with five competitors and three administrators. This trend continued at the 1972 Olympics in Sapporo, which were attended by five staff and four athletes. Milne rose up the rankings to finish 23rd and 24th in the downhill and slalom respectively, as did Coates, who came in the top 30 in three of his four events, including an 18th-place result in the 10,000 m event. Milne was considered a medal contender and the team manager felt that but for a near-fall, he would have placed near the medalists.

=== Henke era ===
Up to this point, Australia's performances had been poor, and winter athletes were often derided by the summer-dominated administrators. During one meeting, a cross-country representative asked for the selection of six athletes, prompting the selection committee chairman to interject. The chairman said that a seventh place would be needed, and went on to explain that a dog was required to find the athletes after they got lost in the snow. The majority of his colleagues burst into laughter.

After the 1968 Winter Olympics, at which the only Australian alpine skier was Milne, skiing delegate Peter Blaxland said that the country should not send a solitary skier for psychological reasons. The Winter Olympics team manager reported that his European counterparts were surprised by Australia's small team. The response from the board—dominated by Summer Olympics delegates—was unsympathetic, with Sir Wilfrid Kent Hughes expressing concern that uncompetitive athletes might be selected. The neglect of the Winter Olympics continued until Henke's appointment as team manager in 1976. Henke held the position for two decades, until Ian Chesterman took over in 1998. He rose to become vice-president of the AOF, and is credited with ending the administrative neglect of winter sport. Up until Henke's appointment, Hickey and Milne were the only athletes to have placed in the top half of any event. In 1981, Henke took AOF board members into the Australian Alps for a board meeting, allowing him to exploit the environment to promote winter sport. He said that the next Olympics "was the first time the AOF ever really got behind the winter team".

Coates reached his peak at the 1976 games in Innsbruck. He competed in five events, and apart from a 25th-place finish in the 500 m event, did no worse than 11th in the remaining four. He came sixth in the 10,000 m, eighth in the 1,500 m and tenth in the 5,000 m. It was only the second time that an Australian had placed in the top 10, and remained Australia's best result until 1994. His five skiing compatriots were less productive; they registered in 13 races between them and completed only seven due to crashes and disqualifications, with only one top 30 result.

In 1980, Australia's competing contingent rose into double figures for the first time since 1960, with 10 representatives. Jacqui Cowderoy became the first Australian to break into the top 20 in a skiing event, placing 17th in the slalom. The brother-and-sister pairing of Peter and Elizabeth Cain, Australia's first representatives in figure skating in 20 years, came 11th. Coates was unable to repeat his performances of four years earlier and his 18th and 19th places were Australia's only other top 20 results.

In 1984 in Sarajevo, Steven Lee and Cameron Medhurst placed 19th in the downhill and individual figure skating respectively. No other top 20 finishes were recorded among the 11 athletes, and the two cross-country skiers and the first Australian Olympic biathlete, Andrew Paul, finished no better than 47th in their eight events. Australia sent 15 athletes to the 1988 Olympics in Calgary, where they competed in the bobsleigh for the first time. The two two-man bobsleigh teams came 23rd and 26th respectively, well down the field.

Although a competitor on paper in 1988, Coates was supposed to only be a coach and was forbidden to compete. The Australian Skating Union had refused to select him as they wanted to allow younger athletes an opportunity to race. However, the AOF officially listed Coates as a competitor so that he could train with the others on the ice, and because the artificially inflated athlete count would entitle the Australian team to take more support staff. However, Coates was informed that the registration was only for show and that he was not to race. However, when it was time for his event, he put on a uniform, defied team orders and skated his best time ever. Henke publicly excoriated Coates in front of the cameras, but stopped when he found out that Prime Minister Bob Hawke had sent Coates a congratulatory message. However, Coates' new Australian record was only good enough for 26th place and ended his sixth and final Olympic campaign. His speed skating teammates Michael Richmond and Danny Kah managed two top 15 finishes each, and Medhurst was the only other Australian to place in the top 20.

The 1992 Winter Olympics in Albertville, France was viewed as the potential start of a new era in Australian winter sports, with hopes that a maiden medal would result. Australia's short track relay team went into the 1992 Olympics as world champions, but crashed in the semi-finals. The Australians were in third place when Richard Nizielski lost his footing and knocked over teammate John Kah during a changeover; they finished fourth and failed to reach the final. In the individual speed skating events, Australia scored only four top 20 finishes from 12 starts, with none higher than 12th, and only one placing in the top half. Kirstie Marshall was in the process of winning the 1992 World Cup series, and was one of the favourites for the women's aerial skiing, which was a demonstration event, but she crash-landed and finished seventh. Lee managed two top 20 finishes in alpine skiing events, and finished in the top half of the competitors in four events; most of the Australians remained in the bottom half in all of their events. Despite the disappointments of the near-misses, Australia increased their investment in the Winter Olympics, purchasing a training base called Sonnpark in Austria in 1993. The 1992 Games also included Speedskiing as a demonstration sport, with four athletes qualified for the Games: Nick Kirshner, Les Herstik, Geoff Tasker and Daniel Guerin. Tasker and Kirshner's nominations where both rejected after their arrival in the village.

=== First medals ===
In 1994, the short track relay team won Australia's first Winter Olympic medal, a bronze. They qualified for the four-team final after edging out Japan and New Zealand, finishing second in their semi-final. The quartet adopted a plan of staying on their feet as the first priority, and remaining undisqualified and defeating at least one of the other three finalists. During the race, the Canadians fell and lost a significant amount of time, meaning that Australia would win a medal if they raced conservatively and avoided a crash. Late in the race, Nizielski was fighting with his American counterpart for track position to claim the silver medal, but took the safe option and yielded, mindful of the lost opportunity of the crash in Albertville. It was a successful campaign for the largest team that Australia had sent—apart from 1960. The 27 athletes recorded an unprecedented five top 10 finishes. Marshall placed first in the opening round of the aerials, but faded to sixth in the final, while Kerryn Rim placed eighth in the 15 km biathlon and Steven Bradbury and Nizielski of the medal-winning relay team placed eighth and tenth in the 500 m and 1,000 m short track events respectively. In contrast to the previous games, the Australian short track speed skaters placed in the top half of the field in six of their eight individual starts. However, the Australians in the remaining disciplines generally finished in the bottom half of their competition.

Further medal success was anticipated at the 1998 Olympics in Nagano, which were attended by 24 Australian athletes. Zali Steggall, who months earlier had become the first Australian woman to win a World Cup event and was ranked sixth in the world, won the country's first individual medal with a bronze in slalom skiing. Her time of 1 m 32.67 s was only 0.27 s behind the gold medallist. Marshall, the world champion in 1997 and 1999, and Jacqui Cooper—ranked second in the world—were expected to do well in the aerials, but both crashed and failed to make the final. Bradbury, Nizielski and Kieran Hansen, three of the quartet that won Australia's maiden medal in 1994, returned but finished last, in eighth place.

=== Golden breakthrough ===
The improved results of the 1990s prompted higher expectations from the Australian Winter Olympic hierarchy. At the start of the 2002 Olympics, the Australian chef de mission Ian Chesterman addressed the team, saying "historically our winter teams have been the child racked by self-doubt, shy in nature as we saw our big brother, our summer Games team, take on and conquer the world." He added, "but over time we have developed a belief in ourselves".

Australia competed in five sports in 2002, the fewest sports entered in since 1984. Australian cross-country skiers were absent for the first time since 1976, and there were no bobsleigh sliders for the first time since Australia's debut in the sport in 1988. This was partly due to the AOC's higher selection standards than those of the IOC. Australian bobsledder Will Alstergren lamented that "We also beat half the teams currently in Salt Lake City, but unfortunately we couldn't meet the very high standard of the AOC". According to the Skiing Australia Cross Country Committee, tougher AOC selection standards contributed to the failure to compete in the discipline in 2002.

In 2002, Australia won their first two gold medals, the first time any southern hemisphere country had won an event. Australia's maiden gold came in highly unlikely circumstances. Steven Bradbury, a member of the bronze-winning 1994 relay team, won gold in short track speed skating on 17 February when all of his competitors in the 1,000 m final crashed out on the final turn while jostling for the medal positions. He had qualified for the final after benefiting from similar incidents and disqualifications in the quarter and semifinals. Bradbury came third in his quarterfinal and would have been eliminated, but world champion Marc Gagnon was disqualified for obstruction and the Australian progressed.

Bradbury's strategy from the semifinal onwards was to cruise behind his opponents and hope that they crashed, as he realised that he could not match their raw pace. His reasoning was that risk-taking by the favourites could cause a racing incident, and if two (or more) riders collided and fell, the remaining three would all receive medals, and that as he was slower than his opponents, trying to challenge them directly would only increase his chance of being caught in a collision and falling.

In the semifinal, three skaters, including the defending champion, crashed into each other and Bradbury moved up into second place to qualify for the final. In the final, Bradbury was substantially slower than his opponents and was safely in last place, around 15 m behind with only 50 m to go, when all four rivals collided and fell over, allowing him to avoid the pile-up and take the victory. The unlikely win turned Bradbury into something of a folk hero across Australia and around the world.

Having won three consecutive World Cup titles, Jacqui Cooper was the favourite in the aerials, but injured herself in training and was sent home days before the competition. Alisa Camplin, who had never won a World Cup event, won after exceeding her rivals' points tally on the second and final jump.

In 2006, Australia sent 40 athletes to compete in 10 sports. It was a record number of competitors and events, and Australian officials publicly declared their expectations of medal success. Aerial skiing medal hopeful Lydia Ierodiaconou injured herself when she landed badly on the second qualification jump, while Jacqui Cooper, who placed first in the qualification round, crashed in both of her finals jumps. Camplin won bronze, her second Olympic medal. Dale Begg-Smith, considered the favourite in moguls skiing, won gold in the event. Torah Bright was rated as a medal chance in snowboarding half-pipe, and came fifth. Damon Hayler, rated as a medal chance in snowboard cross, came seventh. Michelle Steele, a beach flag sprinter less than two years earlier, was seen as a medal possibility in the skeleton, but inexperience with the intimidating and technical track contributed to her 13th place. As only eight teams competed in the men's short track speed skating relay, Australia had a good mathematical chance of winning a medal, but they failed to reach the final.

In 2010, Australia had its most successful Winter Olympics at the time, ending with two gold and one silver. There were a further seven finishes in the top ten. Flagbearer Bright returned and won gold. After falling in her first run in the final—only the highest of the two runs is counted—she had to perform her second run before all the other competitors as she was ranked last after the first phase, and produced the top-score; the later competitors could not match her and she took victory. In 2010, Lydia Lassila (née Ierodiaconou) took gold, having come into the event as the reigning World Cup champion and favourite after setting a record score at a recent World Cup competition. After being second after the first jump, she scored highly on her final attempt, and the leader Xu Mengtao from China failed to land her second jump cleanly, sealing Lassila's win. Cooper returned for a final campaign and came fifth. Begg-Smith was again the favorite after three consecutive World Cup wins, but he was narrowly beaten by local skier Alexandre Bilodeau.

Russian-born short-track speed skater Tatiana Borodulina, whose citizenship was expedited to allow her to compete, made the semifinals in two events, placing 7th and 11th. In the snowboard cross, Hayler came tenth, while Alex Pullin was fastest in the qualification time trial, but crashed in the first round of racing. Scott Kneller came seventh in the men's ski cross, while Holly Crawford came eighth in half-pipe and Emma Lincoln-Smith tenth in the skeleton.

In 2014 at the Sochi, Russia Olympic Winter Games Australia won three Olympic medals and a total of 15 top 10 performances were recorded, a significant increase from the nine achieved in Vancouver in 2010. In addition Australia recorded 27 top 16 performances compared to 15 in Vancouver four years earlier.

This was a Team of history makers. Torah Bright became Australia's most successful female Winter Olympian at the time by adding a silver medal to her gold from Vancouver in 2010. In Sochi, Bright was the only athlete to attempt three Snowboard events at the one Olympics: Slopestyle, Halfpipe and Snowboard Cross. David Morris, Australia's only male Aerialist at the Sochi Games wrote his own piece of Olympic history by completing a double-full full-full (quad twisting somersault) in the men's Freestyle Skiing – Aerials super-final. Morris scored 110.41 points for his jump and was awarded the silver medal. He was later honoured for his achievement by carrying the Australian flag in the Closing Ceremony. Aerials teammate and defending Olympic Aerial Skiing Champion Lydia Lassila was in Sochi to make history. Lydia chose to execute a jump in the women's super-final that no other woman in the history of the sport had attempted in competition, a quad twisting triple somersault. The high degree of difficulty jump scored her 72.12 points and the bronze medal. This historical effort has taken the sport of women's Aerials to a whole new level. Lassila is also the first mother to win a Winter Olympic medal for Australia. Bobsleigh's Jana Pittman became the first female Olympian to compete in both a Summer and Winter Olympics. Callum and Aimee Watson became the first siblings to compete at the same Games in Cross Country. Alex Almoukov pulled off the best ever performance by a male Australian biathlete when he finished 45th in the 20 km Individual. Other historic bests were John Farrow finishing 17th in the men's Skeleton, Belle Brockhoff, eighth in the women's Snowboard Cross and Kent Callister, ninth in the men's Snowboard Halfpipe.

== Infrastructure and training ==
Although Australia has competed in every Winter Olympics since 1936, with the exception of St Moritz in 1948, it was not until the late 1980s that the athletes were supported by institutionalised training, government infrastructure or sports science. Malcolm Milne's success prompted the eventual starting of the Australian Ski Federation by Geoff Henke in the 1980s, and with it, a program to sponsor talented young skiers and send them to Europe to hone their craft. The beneficiaries of this program included Lee, Zali Steggall, and aerial skiers Cooper and Marshall. In 1993, a training centre and base called Sonnpark was set up in Axams, near Innsbruck, Austria, a joint venture between the Australian and Austrian Olympic Committees for summer and winter sports. Colin Hickey said about Sonnpark "Yeah. It's great ... With that sort of back-up, we'd have given them [the Europeans] a run for their money." Australia sold the base in 2002. After the 1998 Winter Olympics in Nagano, the Olympic Winter Institute of Australia (OWIA, initially called the Australian Institute of Winter Sports) was created. It was given a million-dollar annual budget; for the first time, Australia had a federal government–funded full-time winter sports training program to accompany the Australian Institute of Sport. This led to a steady rise in the number of Australians who won medals at World Cup events in the immediate years after the OWIA's creation. After the 2010 Olympics, the OWIA mooted plans to build a half-pipe course at Perisher in the Australian Alps, and a water jump in Brisbane for aerials freestyle training. In 2010, the OWIA's new training base, Icehouse, was opened in Melbourne. The largest facility of its type in the southern hemisphere, it features two large skating rinks and cost AUD58 million.

The Australian Olympic Committee (AOC, formerly the Australian Olympic Federation) is the peak body responsible for Australia's participation at the Olympics. Aside from funding the participation at the Olympics, the AOC provides money for the training and preparation of athletes. This occurs through their funding of the OWIA, grants for athletes to travel overseas to compete and the provision of monetary awards to athletes and their coaches if they win medals at World Cup events or World Championships in the lead up to the Olympics. The funding of the OWIA by the AOC varies by year, but prior to 2022 hovered between AUD500,000 and 1,000,000, with a higher budget in the years immediately before an Olympics. From 2022 to 2026 this was approximately $1.1 million per year escalated at 3% annually plus vehicle lease funding. Through the Australian Sports Commission, the federal government also sponsors OWIA, contributing more than half a million dollars a year. In 2009, the OWIA lobbied the government for an increase in its annual budget from AUD2.1m to AUD29.4m, a fraction of the AUD132m spent by Canada—the host of the 2010 Olympics. In contrast, the funding for the Summer Olympics team was AUD128m per annum and the AOC asked for an increase of AUD108m annually in 2009. Australia aimed to win two medals in 2010, something that was achieved, and which Chesterman touted as justification for further funding to maintain and increase rankings in the face of growing expenditure by other countries.

Following the 2022 Beijing Winter Games, record investments are supporting athletes, coaches and staff to perform at Milano Cortina 2026 with the Australian Government invested AUD$37.5 million into funding for Winter Olympic and Paralympic National Sporting Organisations during this period through various programs.

== Public participation and support for winter sports in Australia ==
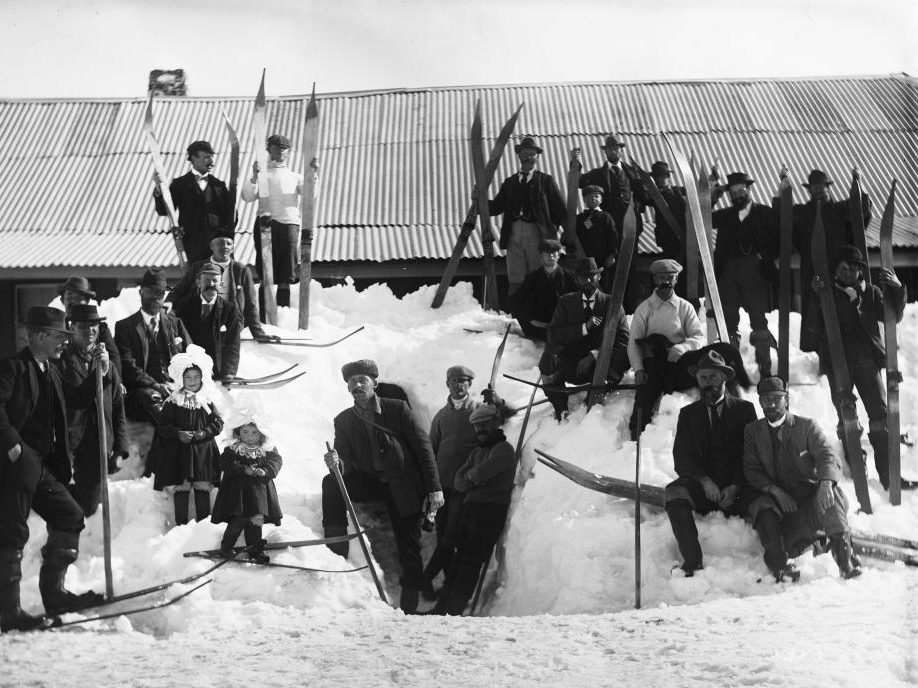
Kiandra, NSW, in 1900. Skiing in Australia began at Kiandra around 1861.

Although Australia is generally considered to be more suited to summer sport, several ice-based sports take place as well. Snow falls on the Australian Alps and parts of Tasmania. The Australian Alps are within six hours' drive for residents of Sydney, but within two hours' drive for residents of Melbourne and Canberra, Tasmanian ski slopes are within a day's drive for residents of the major cities of Hobart and Launceston. However, the season is quite short, as the snow is skiable for only about four months per year. Skiing in Australia was first introduced by Norwegian miners in the goldrush town of Kiandra, New South Wales, around 1859, near today's Selwyn Snowfields ski resort. The sport remains a popular winter activity in the south-eastern states and territories. Major alpine skiing resorts include Thredbo, Perisher and Charlotte Pass in New South Wales; Mount Hotham, Falls Creek and Mount Buller in Victoria and Mount Ben Lomond in Tasmania. Victoria has three dedicated cross-country ski resorts and extensive areas are available for cross-country skiing within national parks including Kosciuszko National Park (NSW), Alpine National Park (VIC); Namadgi National Park (ACT) and in the Tasmanian Wilderness.

The Kiandra snow shoe club is easily among the oldest continuing ski clubs in the world and was established by Norwegian gold prospectors in the mid-19th century. The Australian gold rushes first brought a population of skiers to the Australian snowfields in the 1860s. Ski chalets were established closer to Mount Kosciuszko in the early 20th century and the construction of the Snowy Mountains Hydro-Electric Scheme brought easier access and European workers with an interest in skiing, who helped build the modern ski resorts of New South Wales. In 2004, a mogul course called "Toppa's Dream" was constructed on Blue Cow Mountain. The Mount Buller World Aerials is an annual event on the World Cup calendar. Aerial skiers practice extensively on water before trying jumps on snow; Camplin jumped in a pond outside Melbourne. The Kangaroo Hoppet, a member of the Worldloppet Ski Federation series of cross-country skiing races, is an annual citizen race that attracts competitors from several countries. Ski jumping is currently non-existent in Australia.

Many major Australian cities have indoor ice rinks, enabling participation in some winter sports regardless of the climate. These began to appear at the end of the 19th century, and ice hockey was played as early as 1904. Sydney hosted the 1991 short-track speed skating World Championships, and the 2001 Goodwill Games—hosted in Brisbane—included figure skating. Australia has no tracks usable for bobsleigh, luge and skeleton, but there is a bobsleigh push track in the Docklands area of Melbourne.

In keeping with an existing tradition for Australian gold medallists at the Summer Olympics, Bradbury, Camplin and Begg-Smith's victories were recognised by Australia Post, which released stamps depicting their triumphs, and gave the athletes royalties for the use of their image. Due to the relative lack of interest in winter sport in Australia, both Camplin and Bradbury had been without sponsorship before their Olympic triumphs, and were effectively broke.

== Results ==
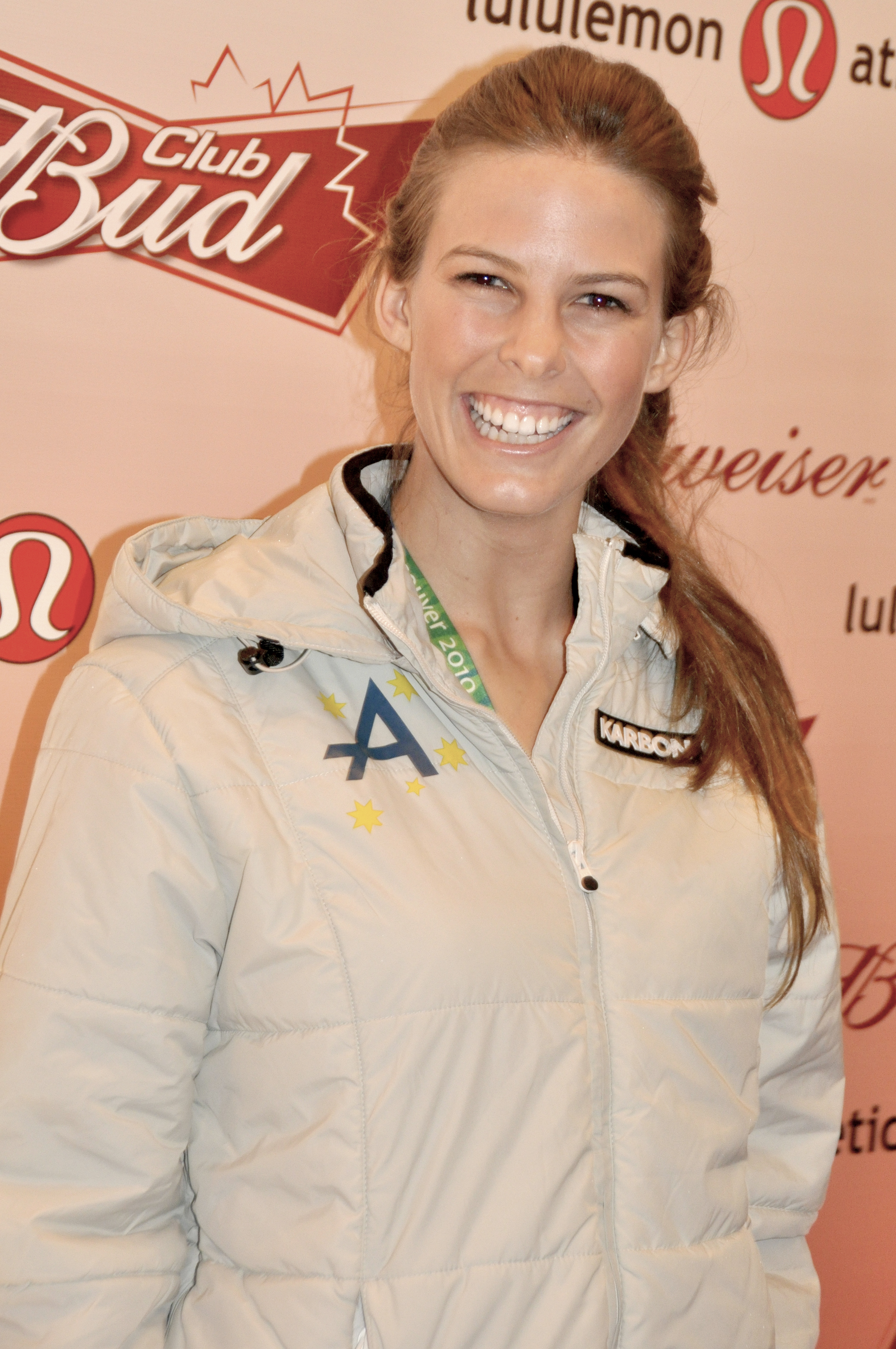
Torah Bright, the winner of the women's halfpipe snowboarding in 2010.

=== Medalists ===
Medal	Name	Games	Sport	Event
Bronze	Steven Bradbury	1994 Lillehammer	Short track speed skating	Men's 5,000 metre relay
Bronze	Kieran Hansen	1994 Lillehammer	Short track speed skating	Men's 5,000 metre relay
Bronze	Andrew Murtha	1994 Lillehammer	Short track speed skating	Men's 5,000 metre relay
Bronze	Richard Nizielski	1994 Lillehammer	Short track speed skating	Men's 5,000 metre relay
Bronze	Zali Steggall	1998 Nagano	Alpine skiing	Women's slalom
Gold	Steven Bradbury	2002 Salt Lake City	Short track speed skating	Men's 1,000 metres
Gold	Alisa Camplin	2002 Salt Lake City	Freestyle skiing	Women's aerials
Gold	Dale Begg-Smith	2006 Turin	Freestyle skiing	Men's moguls
Bronze	Alisa Camplin	2006 Turin	Freestyle skiing	Women's aerials
Gold	Torah Bright	2010 Vancouver	Snowboarding	Women's halfpipe
Gold	Lydia Lassila	2010 Vancouver	Freestyle skiing	Women's aerials
Silver	Dale Begg-Smith	2010 Vancouver	Freestyle skiing	Men's moguls
Silver	Torah Bright	2014 Sochi	Snowboarding	Women's halfpipe
Silver	David Morris	2014 Sochi	Freestyle skiing	Men's aerials
Bronze	Lydia Lassila	2014 Sochi	Freestyle skiing	Women's aerials
Silver	Matt Graham	2018 Pyeongchang	Freestyle skiing	Men's moguls
Silver	Jarryd Hughes	2018 Pyeongchang	Snowboarding	Men's snowboard cross
Bronze	Scotty James	2018 Pyeongchang	Snowboarding	Men's halfpipe
Bronze	Tess Coady	2022 Beijing	Snowboarding	Women's slopestyle
Gold	Jakara Anthony	2022 Beijing	Freestyle skiing	Women's moguls
Silver	Scotty James	2022 Beijing	Snowboarding	Men's halfpipe
Silver	Jaclyn Narracott	2022 Beijing	Skeleton	Women's individual
Gold	Cooper Woods	2026 Milano Cortina	Freestyle skiing	Men's moguls
Gold	Josie Baff	2026 Milano Cortina	Snowboarding	Women's snowboard cross
Silver	Scotty James	2026 Milano Cortina	Snowboarding	Men's halfpipe
Gold	Jakara Anthony	2026 Milano Cortina	Freestyle skiing	Women's dual moguls
Bronze	Matt Graham	2026 Milano Cortina	Freestyle skiing	Men's dual moguls
Silver	Danielle Scott	2026 Milano Cortina	Freestyle skiing	Women's aerials

== Overview by sport ==
In 2006, the Olympic Winter Institute of Australia has programs in alpine skiing, freestyle skiing (aerial and mogul), snowboarding, short track speed skating, figure skating and (along with the Australian Institute of Sport) skeleton. Australia also competed in biathlon, cross-country skiing, bobsleigh and luge at the 2006 Winter Olympics. By the 2026 Milano Cortina Winter Olympics, the Australian team consisted of over 50 athletes, across Alpine Skiing (3), Biathlon (1), Bobsleigh (4), Cross-Country Skiing (7), Figure Skating, Freestyle Skiing [(Aerials - 6), Free Ski Half-Pipe (1), Slopestyle/Big Air (1), Ski Cross (1), Moguls (7)], Luge (1), Short-track Speed Skating (1), Skeleton (1), Ski Mountaineering (2), and Snowboard [Cross - (7), Halfpipe - (5), and Slopestyle/Big Air (3)], with over 10% of the team bringing home medals.

=== Alpine skiing ===
Australia has competed in alpine skiing at every Olympics since 1952. Australia's first female skier, Christine Davy, competed in 1956. Malcolm Milne was considered a possible medalist at the 1972 Olympics, having finished on the podium at the world championships, but a knee injury and a near fall snuffed out his chances.

Steven Lee represented Australia at three Winter Olympics; he won a World Cup event in Furano, Japan in the Super G event in 1985, and was the second Australian to do so. He achieved three top-25 finishes in his career. Zali Steggall won Australia's second Olympic bronze in the slalom event in 1998. Twelve skiers represented Australia at the 2002 Olympics with Jenny Owens achieving the best result in the Downhill Combined event with a 9th place. Four skiers represented Australia in 2006 and only half the number participated in 2010. Three Australian Alpine skiers represented Australia in 2026.

=== Biathlon ===
Australia has participated in biathlon at every Olympics since 1984 except for 2002; Kerryn Rim's eighth place in 1994 in the 15 km individual event was their best result. Cameron Morton represented Australia in 2006 and finished in the bottom 10% in each of his two races. In 2010, Australia's sole representative Alexei Almoukov came second last in his event—one competitor did not finish. Rim's result remains the only top-20 finish by an Australian in the discipline, and more than 80% of Australian entrants have finished in the bottom half of the field, including many in the bottom fifth.

=== Figure skating ===
Australia first competed in figure skating in 1952, and has competed in 1956, 1960 and every Olympics since 1980. In earlier years, Australia earned some last places or near-misses. Until 1988, no Australian had placed above the 20th percentile, but results have slowly improved; Anthony Liu finished 10th out of 28 competitors in the men's event in 2002. Joanne Carter represented Australia in 1998 & 2006. She had placed 12th in 2002 and apart from Liu is the only Australian to have placed in the top half of the field. In 2010, Australia's lone participant Cheltzie Lee came 20th. Australia has competed in ice dancing three times, in 1988, 2014 and 2026, with Holly Harris and Jason Chan placing 18th at the 2026 Milano Cortina Winter Olympics.

=== Freestyle skiing ===
Australia has contested moguls freestyle skiing in every Olympics since it became an official sport in 1992, as well as 1988, when it was a demonstration sport. Unlike in other winter disciplines, Australia started in the upper half of the field in the moguls; Nicholas Cleaver and Adrian Costa placed 11th and 14th out of 47 competitors in 1992. Since then, the results deteriorated into the lower half of the rankings, until 2006, when Canadian-born Dale Begg-Smith won gold and four Australians qualified for the 35-man competition. Manuela Berchtold, the only female Australian representative in 2006, came 14th out of 30 competitors. In 2010, Begg-Smith won silver, while two other moguls racers, one male and one female, were outside the top half and did not pass the first round. The Australian moguls team continued from strength to strength, with Matt Graham winning silver in 2018 and bronze in dual moguls in 2026, Jakara Anthony winning gold in 2022 in moguls and again in 2026 in dual moguls to become Australia's most successful Winter Olympian, as well as Cooper Woods-Topalovic winning gold in 2026 in a Men's moguls final which featured three Australian finalists in the top 8.

Australia has participated in every aerial freestyle event since it became official in 1994, as well as 1992, when it was a demonstration event. Australia has been strong in women's aerial skiing, having recruited gymnasts into the sport, and Kirstie Marshall and Jacqui Cooper have both been regarded as major medal chances, however, both were plagued by injuries and crashes and failed to medal at the Olympic level despite enjoying success in World Cup or world-championship events. Success came in 2002 when Alisa Camplin won Australia's second gold ever, the first for a female Australian winter Olympian and first in Freestyle Skiing. Australia fielded 4 of the 23 qualifiers in the women's aerials in 2006. Lydia Ierodiaconou injured herself when she landed badly in the second qualification jump and failed to reach the final. Camplin and Cooper contested the aerials finals, after the latter qualified first with a world record score of 213.36. Cooper managed only 152.69 in the final and finished eighth, and Camplin went on to win bronze. In 2010, Lassila (née Ierodiaconou) took gold. After being second after the first jump, she scored highly on her final attempt, and the leader Xu Mengtao from China failed to land her second jump cleanly, sealing Lassila's win. Cooper returned for a final campaign and came fifth, while Elizabeth Gardner came 12th in the final. In 2026, Danielle Scott won silver in the Women's Aerials at Milano Cortina. In contrast, Australia has not had as strong male tradition. Until 2010, no male had competed in aerials—one athlete was selected but did not end up taking to the snow due to injury. In 2010, David Morris ended the trend and came 13th out of 25 entrants, and went on to win a silver medal in 2014 at Sochi.

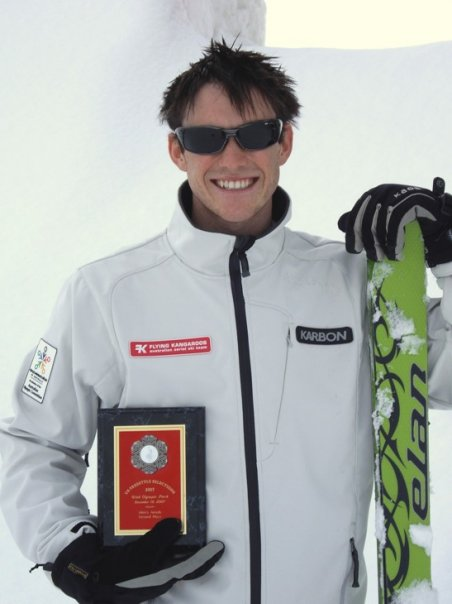
David Morris, Australia's first male aerial freestyle skier at Olympic level.

Ski cross was introduced in 2010. Scott Kneller reached the semifinals and placed seventh in the male competition, while Jenny Owens and Katya Cremer came 13th and 15th, all in the top half of the field.

=== Nordic events ===
Australia has competed in cross-country skiing in 1952, 1960, 1968, 1980 to 1998, and since 2006. The two Australian representatives in 1952 occupied the last two places, and before 1984, no Australian finished above the bottom 15% of racers. Results have slowly improved, but most Australian entrants in the last two decades have placed in the bottom 25%. In 1992, Anthony Evans became the first Australian to place in the top half, finishing in the top 40 in two events. Australia fielded three competitors in cross-country skiing in 2006, its largest contingent in the event. Paul Murray and Esther Bottomley competed in the sprint; Clare-Louise Brumley was selected for the pursuit and 30 km freestyle, but competed only in the former due to illness. Nobody broke into the top half in their respective races. At the 2010 Games, Australia had three representatives. Ben Sim came in the top half in one event, but he, Bottomley and Murray finished in the bottom 20% in their remaining four events. Australia has never competed in ski jumping, and their sole entry in Nordic combined was by Hal Nerdal in 1960, who came last.

=== Sliding events ===
The first Australian to compete in bobsleigh represented Great Britain. Frederick McEvoy drove the British two-man and four-man bobsleighs in 1936, earning fourth place and a bronze respectively, and carried the British flag at the opening ceremony. Australia first competed in bobsleigh in 1988, and has competed in the event in every Olympics since, except for 2002. Paul Narracott became the first Australian to compete at both the Summer and Winter Olympics: he competed in the 1984 Summer Olympics in athletics, and participated in bobsleigh in 1992 as the brakeman. Australia competed in luge in 1992 and 1994. They did not compete in skeleton in 2002.

Australia competed in all three sports in 2006. In bobsleigh, Australia competed in the two-man and two-woman events, and was the highest-placed country to miss qualifications for an Olympic berth in the four-man event at the 2006 Challenge Cup. The Australian Olympic Committee unsuccessfully tried to have the Brazilian bobsleigh team thrown out due to the use of drugs by Armando dos Santos, so that Australia would take its place. Hannah Campbell-Pegg came 23rd in luge, and Michelle Steele, a beach flag sprinter chosen from a systematic program to identify a potential skeleton medal-winner from female non-winter athletes, came 13th due to inexperience with the intimidating and technical track. Shaun Boyle represented Australia in the men's skeleton and placed 22nd. In 2010, Australia was represented by two 2-man bobsleigh teams, Chris Spring with Duncan Harvey, and Jeremy Rolleston with Duncan Pugh. Australia's second Skeleton athlete to complete at an Olympic Games, Anthony Deane, finished 23rd after only 18 months in the sport, while Emma Lincoln-Smith and Melissa Hoar came 10th and 12th respectively. Until 2010, Australia had placed in the bottom half of the field in every sliding event it has entered, and came last in the luge in 1994. Lincoln-Smith's effort in the skeleton in 2010 changed this record.

In 2018, Australia added another two Skeleton athletes to their list of Olympians, John Farrow and Jackie Narracott, finishing 19th and 16th respectfully. Australia's first medal success in Skeleton came from Jaclyn Narracott winning silver at Beijing in 2022. In 2026, Australia was represented in Bobsleigh by four athletes, as well as Skeleton and Luge with one each.

=== Snowboarding ===
Zeke Steggall—brother of Zali—represented Australia in snowboarding's first two appearances at the Olympics in 1998 and 2002, finishing in the bottom 20% in each of his slalom races. The number of events in the discipline was increased and the 2006 team consisted of nine athletes, who competed in all three events for both men and women.

The team representing Australia at the 2006 Winter Olympics was Mitchell Allan (halfpipe), Torah Bright (halfpipe), Andrew Burton (halfpipe), Holly Crawford (halfpipe), Damon Hayler (snowboard cross), Ben Mates (halfpipe), Emanuel Oppliger (parallel giant slalom), Johanna Shaw (parallel giant slalom) and Emily Thomas (snowboard cross). Bright came fifth, and Hayler came seventh, and the pair were the only Australians—apart from Oppliger (15th)—to finish in the top half of their respective events.

In 2010, Torah Bright returned and won gold. After falling in her first run in the final—only the highest of the two runs is counted—she had to perform her second run before all the other competitors as she was ranked last after the first phase, and produced the top-score, which the others could not match. Holly Crawford came eighth in the final. Australia's two male competitors Ben Mates and Scott James finished in the middle of the field and missed the finals. In the snowboard cross, Damon Hayler came tenth, while Alex Pullin was fastest in the qualification time trial, but crashed in the first round of racing, while the sole female racer Stephanie Hickey finished near bottom. Johanna Shaw was again Australia's sole slalom racer, and ended in the bottom half.

Australia's Olympic medal success in snowboarding returned with Jarryd Hughes winning silver in Snowboard Cross in 2018 at Pyeongchang, whilst Scotty James won bronze in the halfpipe. In 2022 in Beijing Scotty James won silver in halfpipe and Tess Coady won bronze in women's slopestyle. At the 2026 Milano Cortina Winter Olympics, Josie Baff represented Australia in Women's snowboard cross and won gold, and Scotty James won his third Olympic medal winning silver in the Men's halfpipe to add to his bronze in PyeongChang, and silver in Beijing to become Australia's first Olympian to win three medals at the Olympic Winter Games

=== Speed skating ===
Australia has competed in either the long track or short track forms of speed skating at every Olympics that it has attended, except 1964. Australia's Winter Olympic inaugural participant was long track speed skater Kenneth Kennedy, who competed in 1936 and placed in the bottom 25% in all of his four events. Colin Hickey finished seventh in 1956 in the 500 and 1,000 m long track speed skating, and placed 13th and 14th four years later. Until 1968, Hickey's four aforementioned results were the only times that an Australian finished in the top half of their event.

Colin Coates participated in six Winter Olympics, from 1968 to 1988, and came sixth in the 10,000 m event in 1976, Australia's best result before Lillehammer. His four top-11 finishes in 1976 made him only the third Australian to place in the top half of a Winter Olympic event. Before the 1988 Olympics, three other athletes had represented Australia in long track racing, and all had placed near the bottom. In 1988, Danny Kah and Michael Richmond both broke into the top 15 and the top half in two events each, and in 1994, the former recorded Australia's best long track result, finishing fifth in the 5,000 m event. However, Australia did not compete in long track again until 2010, when sole representative Sophie Muir became the first woman to compete for the country in the discipline; she came in the bottom fifth of entrants in both her races.

Short track speed skating has provided the country with many firsts. Australia won its first World Championships in a winter sport when their relay team won the 5,000 m race in 1991, which was hosted in Sydney. However, they crashed at the 1992 Olympics when the discipline was introduced and failed to win a medal, and all of the individual competitors finished in the bottom half of the field. They recovered to post a series of strong performances in Lillehammer in 1994. The short track relay yielded Australia's first Winter Olympic medal, a bronze. The Australians also did well individually; all four representatives finished in the top 13 in at least one of their races, and in the top half in six of their eight events, including top-ten finishes for Steven Bradbury and Richard Nizielski.

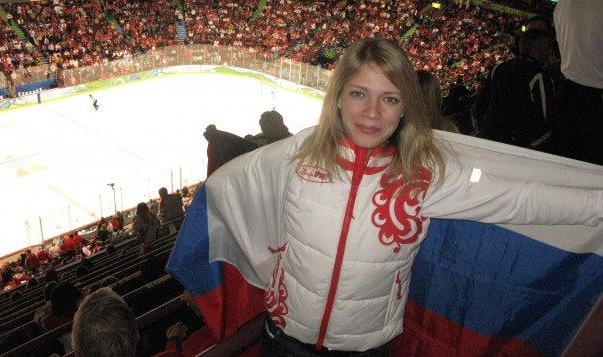
Former Australian short-track speed skater Tatiana Borodulina.

Bradbury won Australia's first winter gold medal in Salt Lake City in 2002, when he was the "last man standing" in the 1,000 m event. Five men and Emily Rosemond competed in short track in 2006. Rosemond placed 12th in the 1,000 m, but none of the others managed to pass the first round. From 1994 to 2006, Bradbury (three times in 2002) and Rosemond have been the only two Australians to finish in the top half of the field, and the men's relay team has missed the final on every occasion. In 2010, the sole male racer Lachlan Hay was eliminated in the first round, while the sole female, Tatiana Borodulina made the semifinals in two events, placing 7th and 11th.

=== Team ice sports ===
Australia has competed once in ice hockey, in 1960. The team lost every game, placing last out of nine countries. Australia competed in curling as a demonstration sport, placing seventh in 1992. Australia competed in Olympic curling for the first time in the mixed doubles event at the 2022 Winter Olympics, represented by Tahli Gill and Dean Hewitt, who finished tenth with a 2–7 round-robin record.

== Australia at the Winter Paralympics ==
Australia has competed in every Winter Paralympics since the inaugural games in 1976. Their sole participant in 1976 was Ron Finneran, although he was not an official entrant. In 1980, alpine and cross-country skier Kyrra Grunnsund and cross-country skier Peter Rickards became the first official competitors for Australia. The number of Australian athletes increased to three, five, five and six at the next four games, respectively, and all of the athletes were alpine skiers. The participation decreased to four in 1998 and climbed back up to six in 2002. Australia won its first Winter Paralympic medals in 1992, and has medalled at every games since then. All of the medals have been won in alpine skiing.

Australia won four medals in 1992—one gold, one silver and two bronze. Michael Milton, an amputee alpine skier, won gold in the slalom and silver in the super-G. In paraplegic sit-skiing, David Munk won bronze in the super-G, and Michael Norton won bronze in the downhill. In 1994, Australia won three gold, two silver and four bronze medals. Milton won gold in the giant slalom, silver in the slalom and bronze in the downhill and super-G, and Norton won gold in the slalom and super-G. James Patterson, a skier with cerebral palsy, won silver in the downhill and bronze in the giant slalom. Munk won another bronze, this time in the giant slalom. In 1998, Australia won two medals, both through Paterson: gold in the downhill and bronze in the slalom.

In 2002, Australia's medal count consisted of six golds and one silver. Milton swept his disability class, winning gold in the downhill, super-G, giant slalom and slalom. Bart Bunting, a vision-impaired skier guided by Nathan Chivers, won gold in the downhill and super-G, and silver in the giant slalom.

In 2006, Emily Jansen, a leg amputee alpine skier, became Australia's first female Winter Paralympian. James Millar, born without his right forearm, competed in the cross-country and the biathlon, becoming the first Australian to compete in an event outside alpine skiing. Milton attended his last Paralympics, but did not win a medal. A target of two medals was set, which took into account the merging of several disability classes. Australia met this target, as Milton won silver in the downhill and Toby Kane won bronze in the super-G. In 2010, Australia won a silver and three bronze medals, all in alpine skiing. Jessica Gallagher became the first Australian woman to win a medal, taking bronze in the slalom for the visually impaired. Cameron Rahles Rabula won bronze in both the slalom and super combined.

== See also ==
- Australia at the Olympics
- Australia at the Winter Paralympics
- Australia at the Commonwealth Games
- Olympic Winter Institute of Australia
- Skiing in Australia
