= Geoff Henke =

Australian ice hockey player

Geoffrey "Geoff" John Henke, AO (3 October 1927 – 22 November 2026) was a Australian ice hockey player and Australian Olympic Committee official. He was the chef de mission of the Australian Winter Olympic delegations from 1976 until 1994, and is credited with ending the neglect of winter sports in Australia.

== Olympic participation ==
Winter sports have traditionally been unattended by Australian Olympic officials. In 1956, the ice hockey team offered to pay their own way and the only thing that they needed from the AOF was formal permission. However, the AOF never responded to their request, and they were unable to attend, and criticised the AOF for their disinterest. One of the affected athletes was Henke.

Henke became the chef de mission in 1976 and held the position for two decades, until Ian Chesterman took over in 1998. Henke rose to become vice-president of the AOF, and is accredited with ending the AOF's neglect of winter sport. Up until Henke's appointment, Colin Hickey and Malcolm Milne had been the only athletes to have placed in the top half of any event.

In 1981, Henke took AOF board members into the Australian Alps for a board meeting, allowing him to exploit the environment to promote winter sport. He said that the next Olympics "was the first time the AOF ever really got behind the winter team".

He would feature in a minor controversy with Speed Skater, Colin Coates at the 1988 Winter Olympics. While Coates was officially listed as an Athlete for the games, he was in reality, there to coach the Speed Skating team, with his "Athlete" status, simply to enable Ice time. Coates would defy Henke and the Australian Ice Skating Federation, who had informed him, he could not race, and would end up taking part in the 10,000m race to compete at his sixth Olympic Games at age 41. Henke was so enraged at Coates, going behind his back, he almost pulled him off the Ice mid race, before deciding that, he would let Coates finish, before punishing him with a verbal attack.

The 1992 Winter Olympics in Albertville, France was viewed as the potential start of a new era in Australian winter sports, with hopes that a maiden medal would result. Australia's short track relay team went into the 1992 Olympics as world champions, but the team crashed in the semi-finals. Kirstie Marshall was in the process of winning the World Cup series for the year, and was one of the favourites for the women's aerial skiing, but she crash-landed and finished seventh.

In 1994, Australia's short track relay team won Australia's first Winter Olympic medal, a bronze. It was a successful campaign for Henke's swansong; the largest team that Australia had sent apart from 1960, with 27 athletes, recorded an unprecedented five top 10 finishes. Marshall came sixth in aerials, while Kerryn Rim placed eighth in the 15 km biathlon and Steven Bradbury and Nizielski of the medal-winning relay team placed eighth and tenth in the 500 m and 1,000 m short track events respectively. In contrast to the previous games, the Australians placed in the top half of the field in six of their eight individual starts.

== Development work ==
Malcolm Milne's success prompted the eventual starting of the Australian Ski Federation by Henke, and their program to sponsor talented young skiers and send them to Europe to hone their craft, among them Steven Lee, and Zali Steggall, and aerial skiers Jacqui Cooper and Kirstie Marshall.

After the 1998 Winter Olympics in Nagano, the Olympic Winter Institute of Australia (initially called the Australian Institute of Winter Sports) was created. It was given a million-dollar annual budget and for the first time, Australia had a federal government-funded full-time training program to accompany the Australian Institute of Sport. This led to a steady rise in the number of Australians who have won medals at World Cup events in the immediate years after the OWIA’s creation. Henke was the inaugural chairman.

== Family ==
He married 1952 Olympic representative in figure skating Gweneth Molony, and their daughter Joanne Henke was a member of the downhill skiing team in 1976.

== Honours ==
Henke was made a Member of the Order of Australia in 1987 and an Officer of the Order of Australia in 1999. In 1993 he was inducted into the Sport Australia Hall of Fame, and in 1998 he received the Olympic Order. He received an Australian Sports Medal in 2000 and a Centenary Medal in 2001. In 2008, he became the first Australian to be made a lifetime member of the International Ski Federation.

In December 2009, it was announced that Rink 1 at Melbourne's soon-to-be-opened Medibank Icehouse would be named in Henke's honour.

== See also ==
- Australia at the Winter Olympics
