= Robert Chisholm =

Robert Chisholm may refer to:

- Robert Chisholm (Canadian politician) (born 1957), former Nova Scotia provincial NDP leader, federal NDP member of parliament
- Robert Kerr Chisholm (1819–1899), Canadian politician
- Robert Chisholm (architect) (1840–1915), British architect in Kerala, India, designer of Napier Museum
- Robert Chisholm (sports administrator) (1910–1998), Australian sports administrator
- Robert Chisholm (mayor) (1843–1914), mayor of Dunedin, New Zealand
- Robert Chisholm (bowls) (born 1985), Welsh bowls international
