= Winter sport in Australia =

Overview of winter sports practiced in Australia

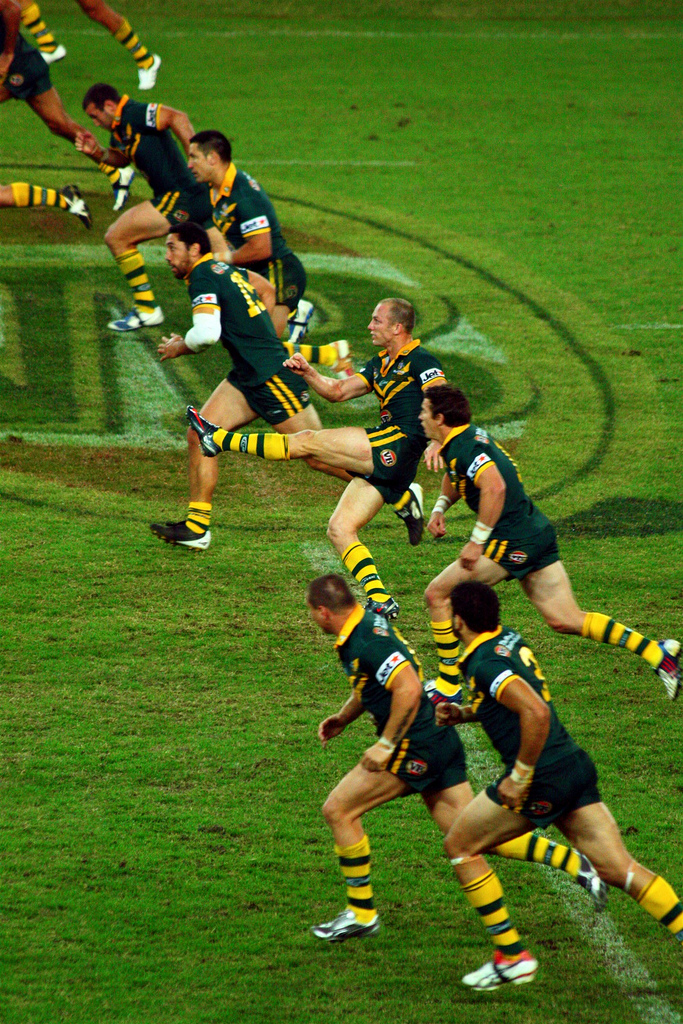
Australia's National Rugby League Team, Brisbane 2009.

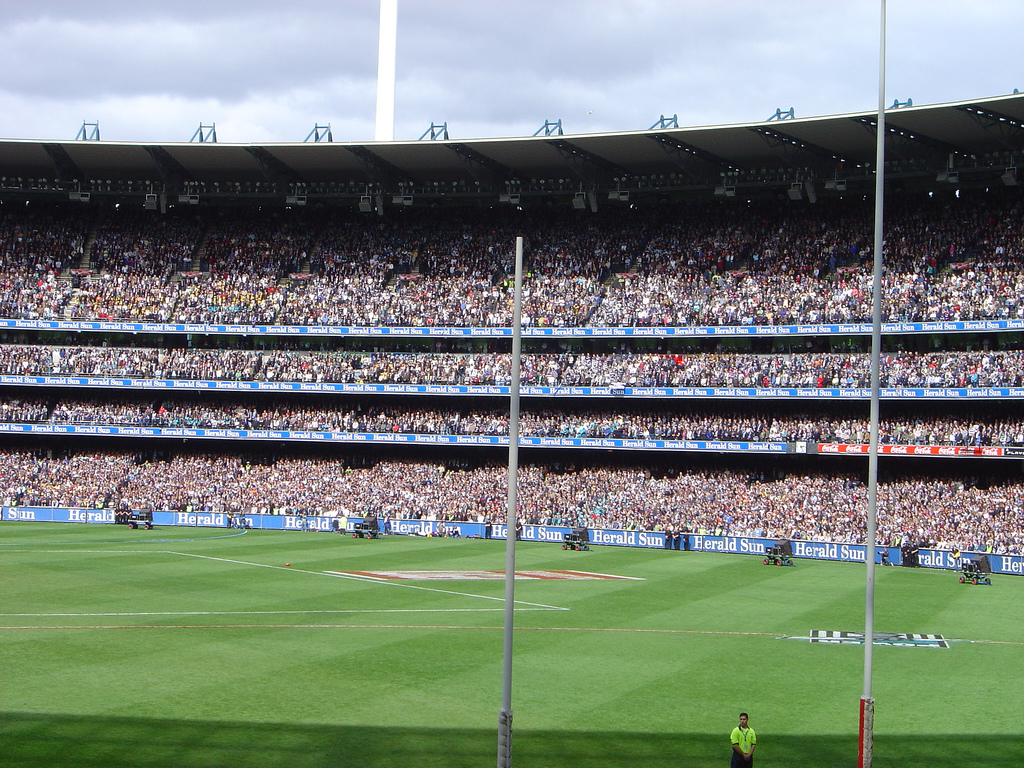
A sold out Melbourne Cricket Ground crowd during the Australian rules football (AFL) Grand Final Day of 2007.

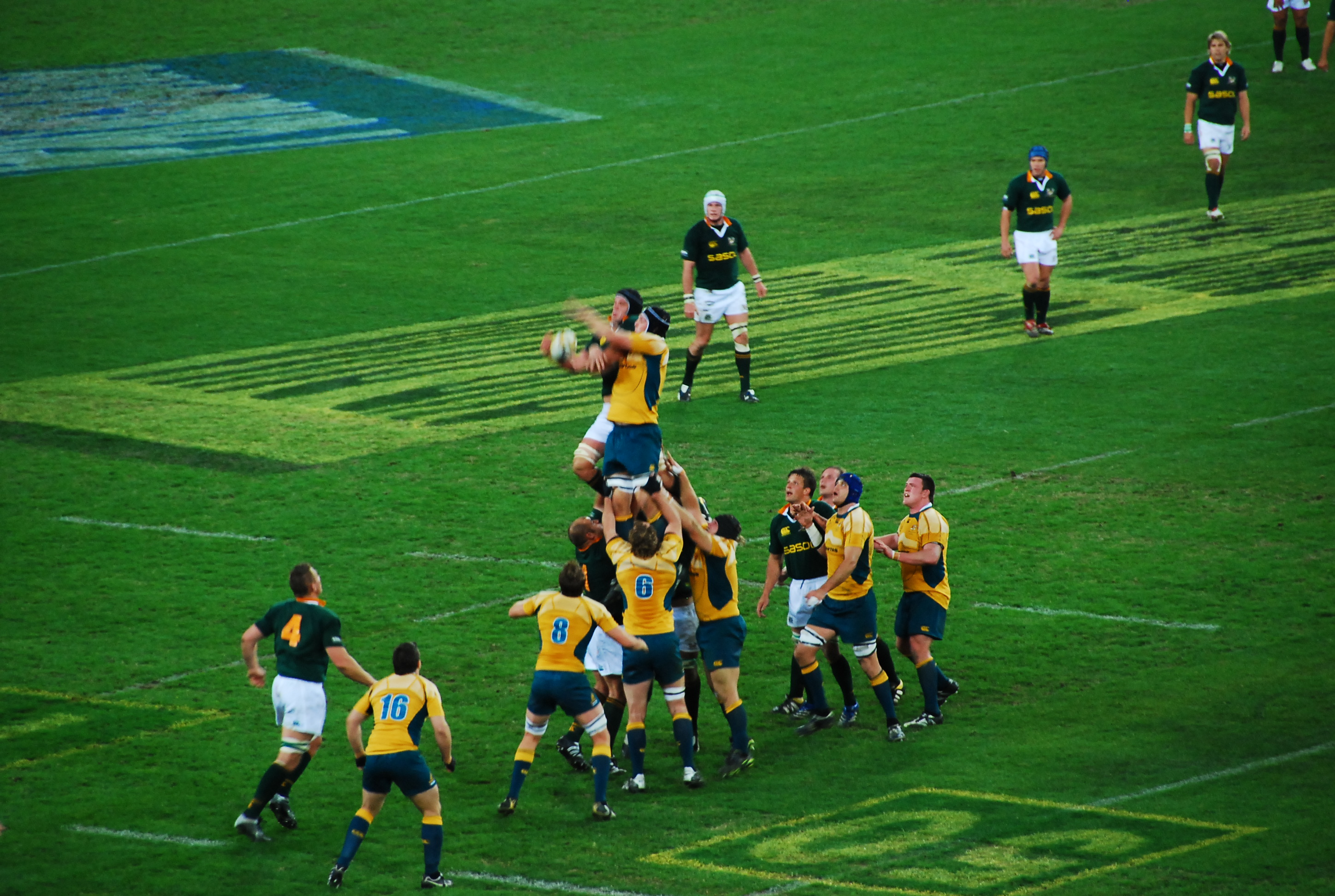
The Australia national rugby union team compete for the ball in a lineout in a match against the South African Springboks.

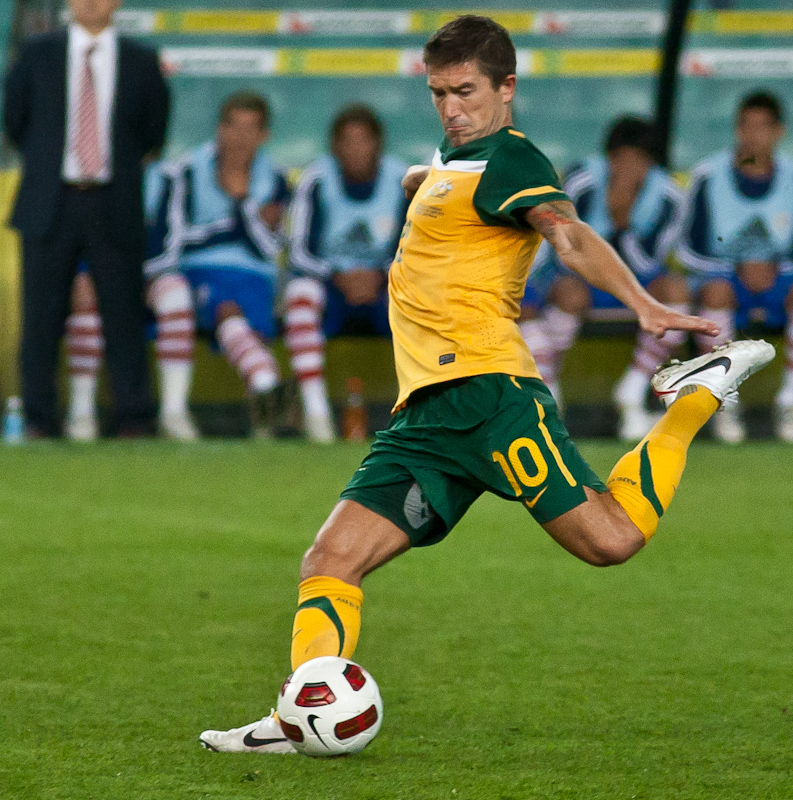
Harry Kewell playing for the Australian National Soccer Team (Socceroos).

Winter sports in Australia encompasses a great variety of activities across the continent of Australia, including winter sports played in snow and ice such as ice hockey. Climate varies considerably from the tropical North to temperate South in Australia, and sporting practices vary accordingly. Ice and snow sports like Skiing in Australia are conducted in the high country of the Australian Alps and Tasmanian Wilderness. Australia has relatively low mountain ranges, but a long history of participation in recreational skiing (since the 1860s) and the Winter Olympic Games (since 1936). Australians have won olympic gold in ice skating, skiing and snow-boarding events. Australia's generally flat geography and usually mild winter climate otherwise provide ideal conditions for international non-snow/ice winter sports and team games like rugby union football, rugby league football, and association football (soccer), which are all popular sports during the Australian winter and in which Australia has enjoyed considerable international success. Australian rules football is a home-grown winter football code with a wide following throughout Australia. Many other sports are also played or watched in Australia through the winter season.

== Sports played in winter ==
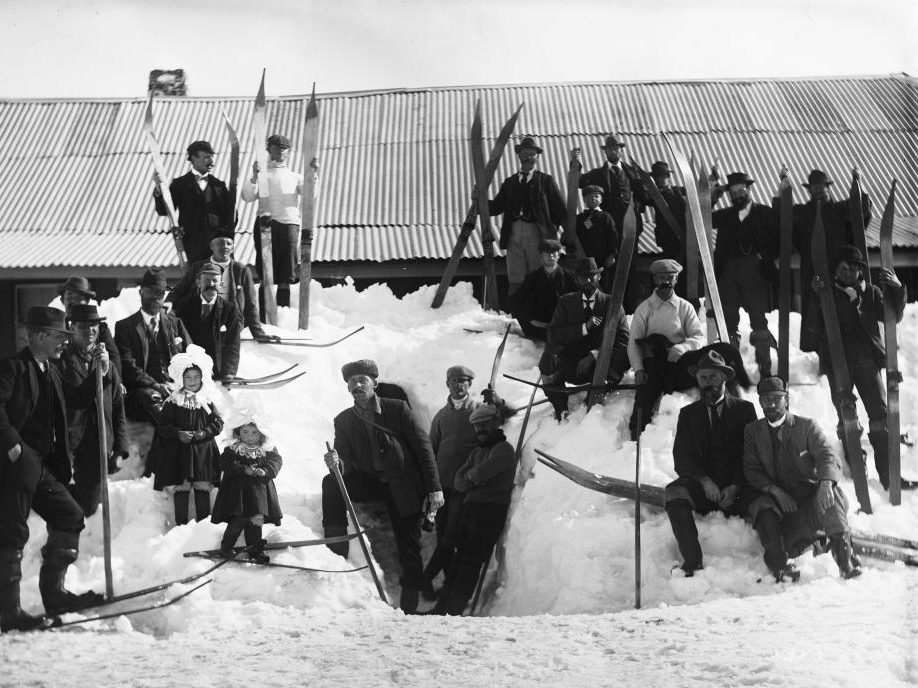
Kiandra Snow Shoe Carnival, 1900

Australia's mild winters mean that in most parts of Australia, regular outdoor sports can be played all year, and indeed more vigorous sports are more comfortably played in winter. Australian rules football, rugby union, and rugby league, the three most popular spectator sports in Australia, are played primarily in winter. See Sport in Australia

Ice sports in Australia began with the opening of the first ice skating rink in Australia, the Adelaide Glaciarium, designed by a refrigeration technician by the name of Henry Newman Reid. On Wednesday 1 June 1904, the prospectus for the acquisition of the Cyclorama building on 89 Hindley Street, Adelaide was issued. The remodeled Cyclorama building opened as the Glaciarium on the evening of Tuesday 6 September 1904. Skating and ice sports were played in the venue. An ice polo league called the Warehouseman's League was formed, a sport in which was often refererred to as 'hockey on the ice' but was not actually ice hockey.

It wasn't until Reid built his second rink in Melbourne, Victoria named the Melbourne Glaciarium, that ice hockey began. The Melbourne Glaciarium opened on the afternoon of 9 June 1906, at 16 City Road, South Melbourne Victoria.

== Turf sports ==
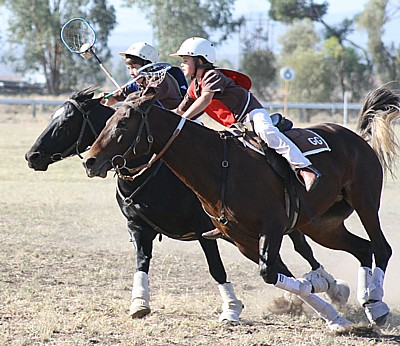
Juniors playing polocrosse in NSW, Australia

=== Rugby Union ===
Reports of rugby union being played in Australia date back to the 1820s, with local clubs established by the 1860s. The game has been especially popular as a winter sport in Queensland, New South Wales and the Australian Capital Territory. The Australian national rugby union team is called the Wallabies. Since the 1920s the Wallabies have worn green and gold jerseys. Despite having a relatively small player base, mainly in NSW and Queensland, the national side has twice won the Rugby World Cup – in 1991 and 1999. Australia hosted the 2003 Rugby World Cup, which saw the Wallabies defeated by England in the final at Telstra Stadium. Other notable competitions include the annual Bledisloe Cup played against Australia's traditional rivals, the New Zealand All Blacks since 1931, and the Rugby Championship, against Argentina and South Africa. Australia has produced a number of notable rugby players of national stature, including Sir Edward Dunlop, Mark Ella (one of the first indigenous Australians to captain a national side) the prolific try scorer David Campese, and current players Michael Hooper and Samu Kerevi.

=== Rugby League ===
In 1908, rugby league was established in Australia by former rugby union players and supporters as a breakaway professional code. The new code gained and has maintained a wider following in Australia than rugby union, which remained amateur until the 1990s. It has traditionally been seen as a "working man's sport" with its roots in the working class communities of the northern English counties of Lancashire and Yorkshire translating to similar areas of Western Sydney and Brisbane. Rugby league is the most popular winter sport in New South Wales, Queensland and the Australian Capital Territory. The elite club competition is the National Rugby League (NRL), which features ten teams from New South Wales, three teams from Queensland, and one team each from Victoria, Australian Capital Territory and New Zealand. The season culminates in the premiership deciding game, the NRL Grand Final, traditionally one of Australia's most popular sporting events and one of the largest club championship matches in the world. Rugby League is played in all Australian states and territories, but has a much reduced participation in the southern and western states. The New South Wales Blues and Queensland Maroons play a representative series against each other every year, called the State of Origin series, which is one of Australia's major sporting events. In addition, the Australian Kangaroos represent the country in international matches. Since its inception in 1954, the Australian team has dominated the Rugby League World Cup, having won the competition nine times.

=== Australian Rules Football ===
Australian rules football (usually called " Football, Aussie rules" or "AFL") is a popular spectator sport and a participation sport in all Australian states and territories, though its core support lies in four of the six states; Victoria, South Australia, Western Australia and Tasmania. The national competition, the Australian Football League, evolved from a Victorian state competition. The AFL Grand Final is traditionally played each year at the Melbourne Cricket Ground. Australian rules football culture has a strong set of rituals and traditions, many of which have crossed sporting boundaries in Australia.

=== Soccer ===
Soccer is a high participation football code, with both boys and girls at junior level as well with men and women at senior level. A number of major international stars have played for the national team in recent years including Tim Cahill, Mark Viduka, Mark Schwarzer and Harry Kewell. Australia's national team, the Socceroos, as of 2016 has competed at four FIFA World Cups. The Australian Government sought to host the event, the world's most watched sporting event, in either 2018 or 2022 but the bid failed.

=== Polocrosse ===
Polocrosse is an equine team sport that was developed in New South Wales before the Second World War. This sport is now played by men, women and juniors in many parts of the world.

== Snow sports ==
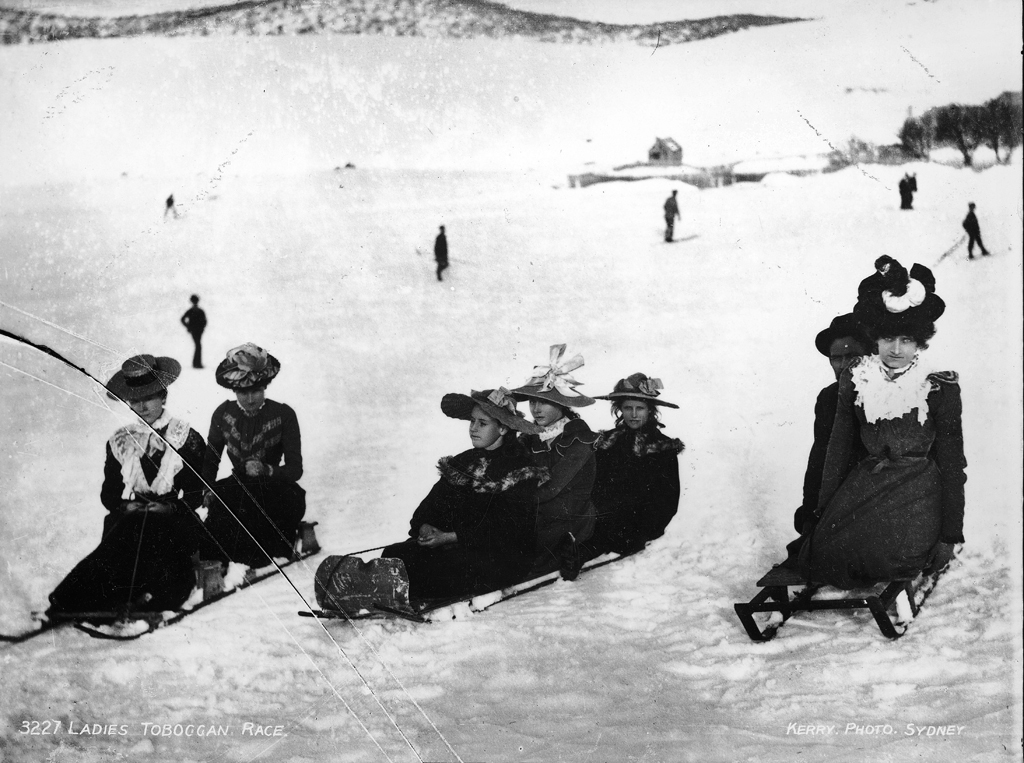
Ladies' Toboggan Race, Kiandra, c. 1884–1917

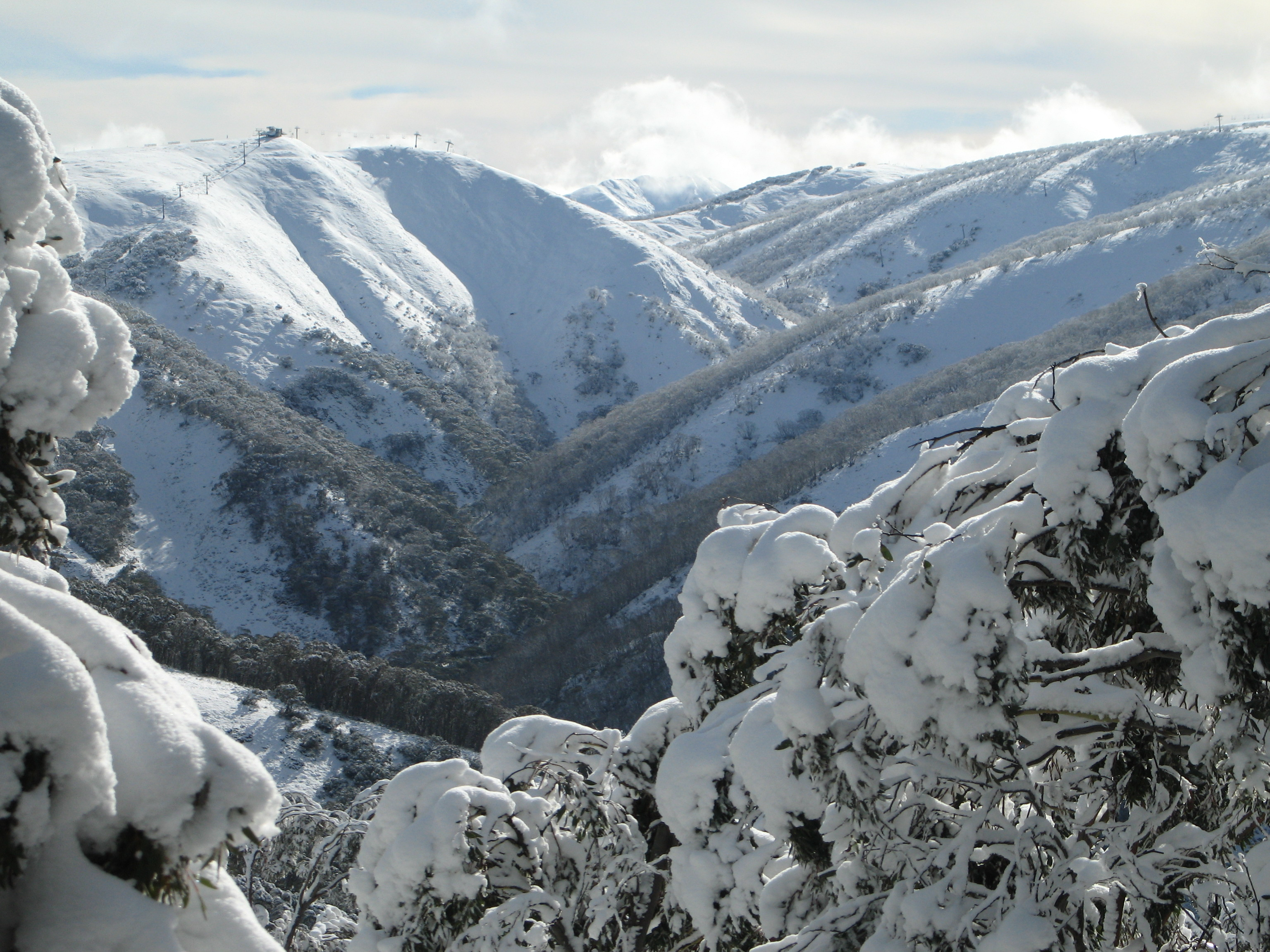
Mount Hotham ski resort, Victoria

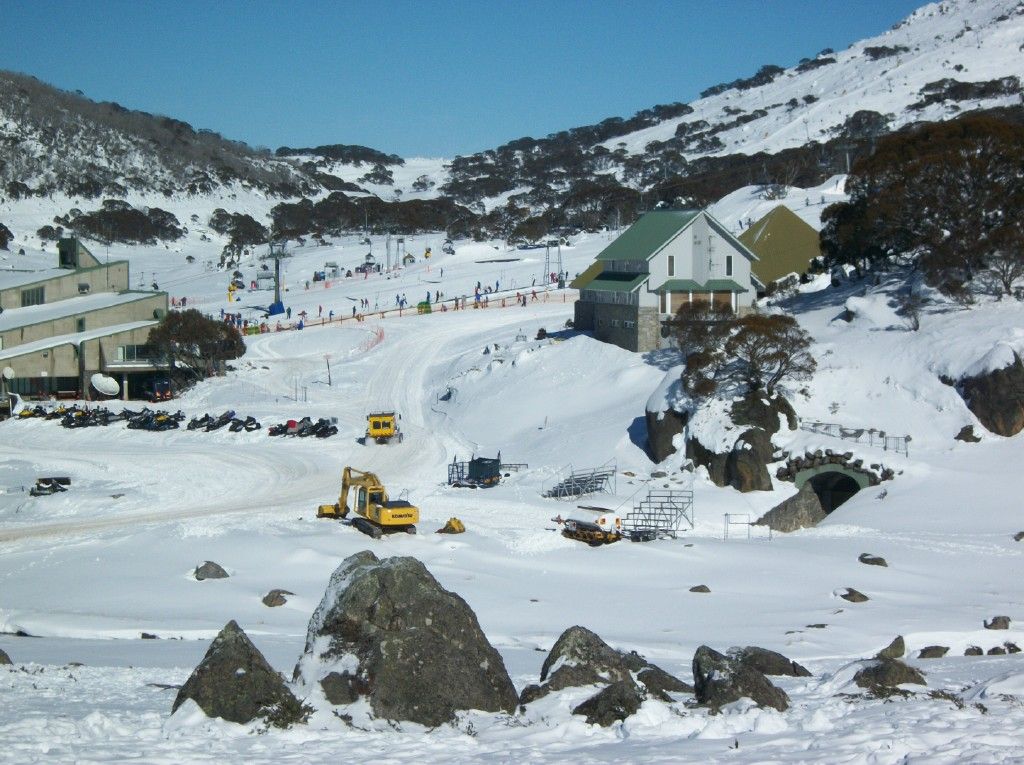
Perisher is Australia's largest ski resort

=== Alpine Skiing ===
During the Southern Hemisphere winter, snow skiing and snow boarding takes place in the high country of the states of New South Wales, Victoria and Tasmania, and cross-country skiing is also possible in the Australian Capital Territory.

New South Wales is home to Australia's highest snow country, oldest skifields and largest resorts. The highest peak in New South Wales is Mount Kosciuszko, at 2200m. Victoria is the State with the greatest number of ski resorts in Australia. The highest peak in Victoria is Mount Bogong at 1986m. The most northerly ski fields in Australia are located in the A.C.T. - in the Brindabella Ranges which rise to the west of Canberra, the capital city of Australia, and include the Namadgi National Park in the A.C.T. and Bimberi Nature Reserve and Brindabella National Park in New South Wales. The highest mountain in the ACT is Bimberi Peak, which lies above the treeline at 1912 metres, at the northern edge of the Snowy Mountains. The most southerly ski fields in Australia are located in Tasmania, a mountainous island off the southern coast of Eastern Australia. Much of the State is subject to at least occasional winter snows. Mount Ossa is the highest point on the island at 1614m but Tasmania has eight mountains exceeding 1500m and 28 above 1,220m. Also notable is the Central Plateau, at an elevation of around 900m. The capital city of Hobart is built at the base of Mount Wellington, which at 1270m is snow-capped in winter.

Skiing began in Australia at the goldrush town of Kiandra, New South Wales around 1861. The Kiandra snow shoe club founded around that time (now called the Kiandra Pioneer Ski Club (1861)) remains the world's first identifiable and ceaseless Ski Club. The Club held separate ski races for both ladies and children as early as 1885. In 1908, the club held the first ever documented International and Intercontinental Downhill Skiing Carnival. Results- America first, Australia second, England third. The first Kosciuszko Chalet was built at Charlotte Pass in 1930, giving relatively comfortable access to Australia's highest terrain. The first Australian ski tow was constructed near Mount Buffalo, Victoria in 1936. It was the construction of the vast Snowy Mountains Hydro-Electric Scheme from 1949 that really opened up the Snowy Mountains of New South Wales for large scale development of a ski industry and led to the establishment of Thredbo, Perisher and Guthega as leading Australian resorts.

Australian skiers competed in the Winter Olympics for the first time in Oslo 1952 and have competed in all subsequent Games, winning medals at every Games since 1998. Malcolm Milne became the first non-European to win a ski race world cup in 1969 and Olympic medalists include Zali Steggall, Alisa Camplin and Dale Begg-Smith.

Australia has extensive skiable terrain during the southern hemisphere winter in the south eastern states and Australian Capital Territory, between elevations of around 1250m to 2200m. Elevation of the snowfields in Australia varies with latitude, however viable winter snows are generally found above 1500m: Thredbo, near mount Kosciuszko, has Australia's highest lifted point at 2037m and its base elevation is 1365m. Kiandra, in the Northern Skifields, has an elevation of 1400m, while Mount Mawson near Hobart, Tasmania is at 1250m.

A number of well serviced resorts have been developed, including: Thredbo, Perisher, Charlotte Pass and Selwyn Snowfields in New South Wales; Mount Buller, Falls Creek, Mount Hotham, Mount Baw Baw and Mount Buffalo in Victoria; as well as the small resorts of Ben Lomond and Mount Mawson in Tasmania. Cross country skiing is popular in such national parks as Kosciuszko National Park and Alpine National Park and is also possible within Namadgi National Park and in the Tasmanian Wilderness.

The Australian Alps are within driving range for weekend trips for residents of Sydney, Melbourne and Canberra, while Tasmanian ski slopes are within day trip range for residents of the state.

In 2004, a mogul course called "Toppa's Dream" was constructed on Blue Cow Mountain. The Mount Buller World Aerials is an annual event, the first on the World Cup calendar. Aerial skiers practice extensively on water before trying jumps on snow, and Camplin practised jumps in a pond in Wandin (one hour's drive from Melbourne). The Kangaroo Hoppet, a member of the Worldloppet Ski Federation series of cross-country skiing races, is an annual citizen race that attracts competitors from several countries. Ski jumping is currently non-existent in Australia.

The only Australian Biathlon training course is located at Dinner Plain, Victoria near Mount Hotham.

=== Cross country and back country skiing ===
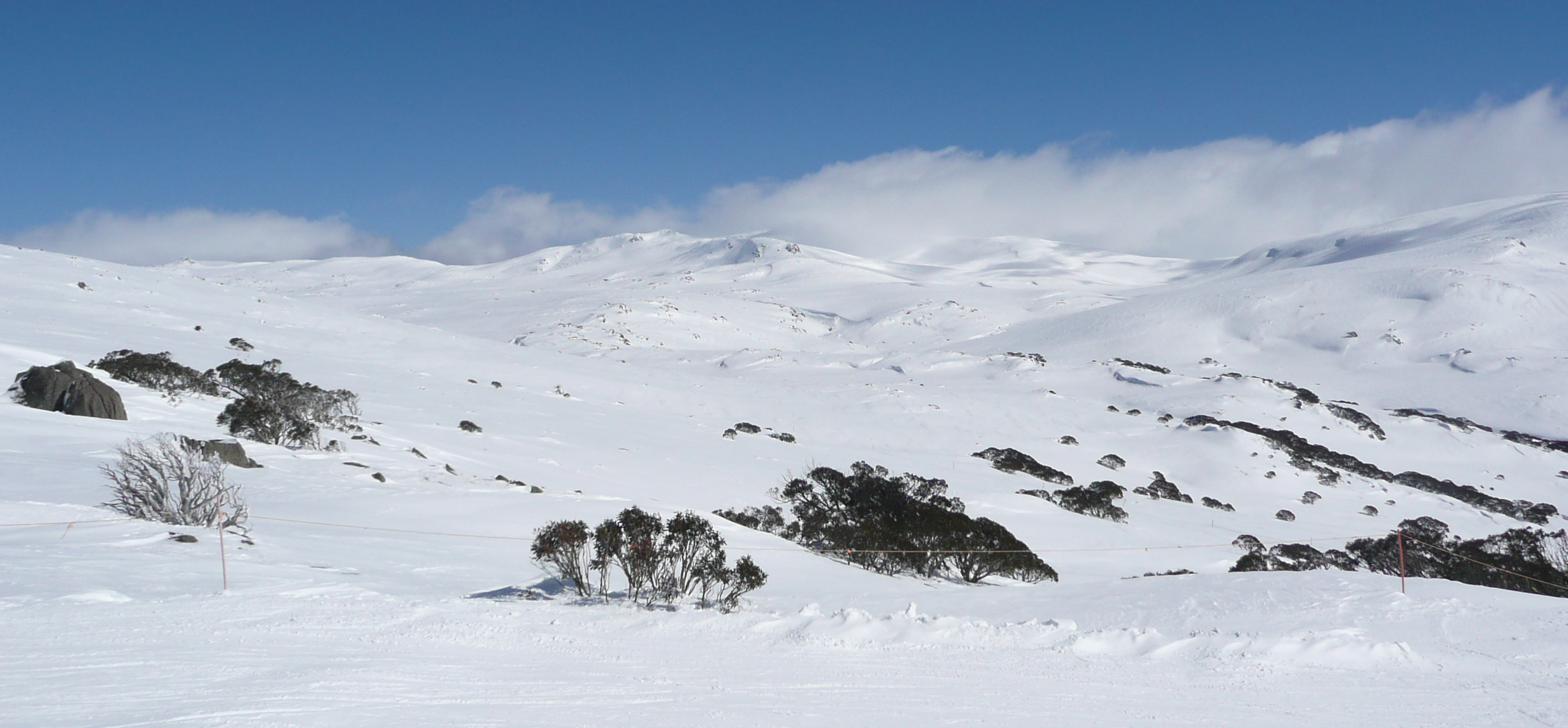
The Kosciuszko Main Range.

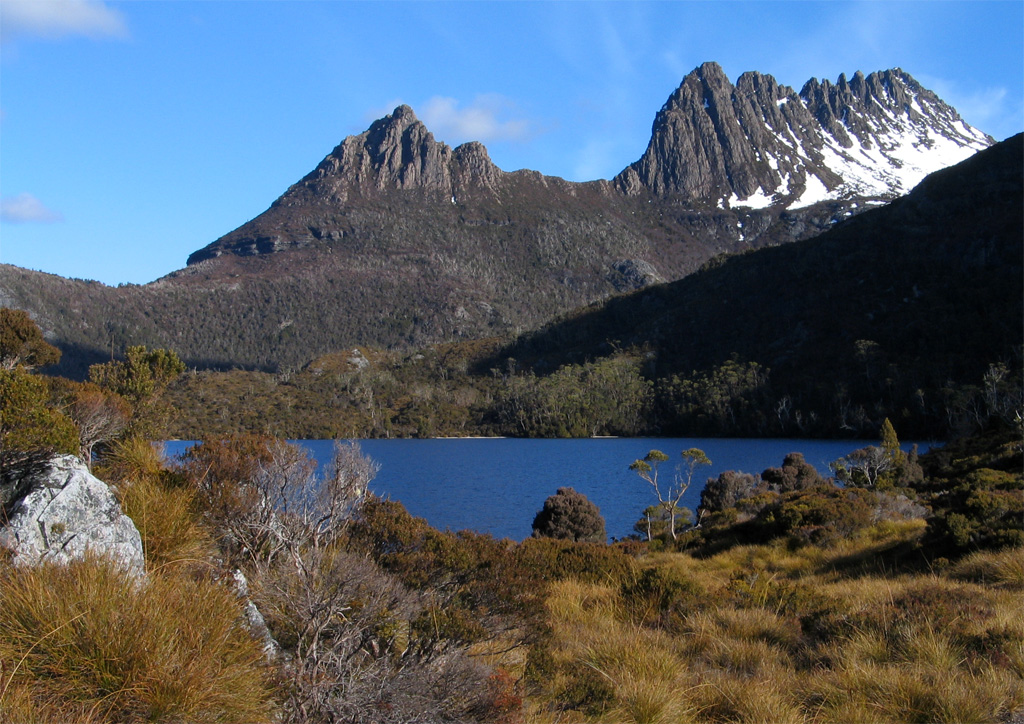
Cradle Mountain in Tasmania's UNESCO World Heritage Wilderness Area

The Kosciuszko Main Range in the Snowy Mountains of New South Wales offer some of the most challenging cross-country and back-country skiing in Australia, notably Watsons Crags and Mount Twynam on the steep Western Face of the Range. The Mount Jagungal wilderness area provides some of the most isolated back-country ski terrain. High country huts, often a legacy of the era of cattle grazing in the mountains, provide emergency shelter in these regions.

Dedicated Cross Country ski resorts are located at Lake Mountain, Mount Stirling and Mount St Gwinear in Victoria and popular areas for back country skiing and ski touring in the Alpine National Park, Yarra Ranges National Park and the Baw Baw National Park include: Mount Bogong, Mount Feathertop, Bogong High Plains, Mount Howitt, Mount Reynard and Snowy Plains. The Kangaroo Hoppet is a leg of the Worldloppet cross-country race series which is conducted on the last Saturday of August each year, hosted by Falls Creek in Victoria. The showpiece 42-kilometre race attracts thousands of spectators and competitors.

Cross country skiing can be possible in the Brindabella Ranges which rise to the west of Canberra, in the A.C.T, and include the Namadgi National Park and Bimberi Nature Reserve. Mount Franklin Chalet, built in 1938, in the A.C.T. played a pioneering role in providing lifted ski runs in Australia, however the chalet was converted to a museum and subsequently destroyed by fire in 2003, so today only cross country skiing can be practised in the area (when conditions allow). Cross Country skiing is also practised at Mount Gingera, elevation 1855m, a prominent snow-covered peak above the city of Canberra.

When conditions allow, Australia's rugged island State of Tasmania also offers cross country skiers some scenic terrain - notably in the UNESCO World Heritage area around Cradle Mountain. Tasmania has 28 mountains above 1,220m and much of the island is subject to at least occasional winter snow.

The Australian High Country is populated by unique flora and fauna including wombats, wallabies, echidnas, and the snow gum. The Alpine regions are subject to environmental protection, which has limited the scope of commercial development of skiiable terrain, however Australia has extensive cross country skiing terrain.

=== Snowboarding ===
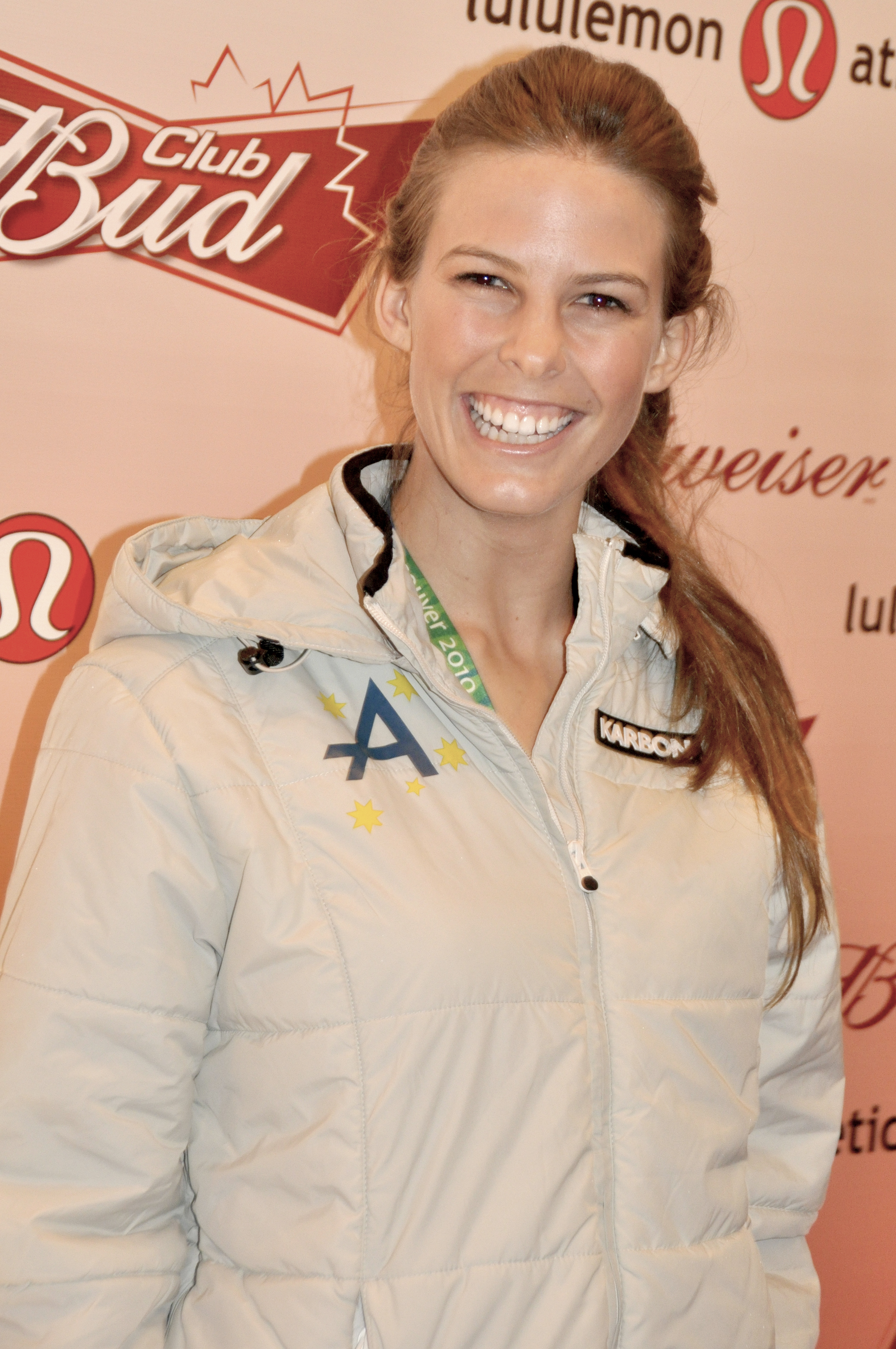
Torah Bright of Cooma, NSW, the winner of the women's halfpipe snowboarding at the 2010 Winter Olympics

The sport of snowboarding is also popular in the Australian skifields and Australia has been represented at the Olympics in this sport ever since it debuted at Nagano in 1998. Torah Bright, of the Snowy Mountains town of Cooma, New South Wales, won gold for Australia at the Vancouver Olympics in 2010 in the women's snowboard halfpipe event. Australia finished on top of the medal tally at the snowboarding world championships in 2011. Bright's gold medal - combined with the gold and silver skiing event medals – made 2010 Australia's most successful winter Olympic Games.

=== Sliding sports ===
Australia lacks any bobsleigh tracks (used for bobsleigh, luge and skeleton), but there is a bobsleigh push track in the Docklands area in Melbourne.

== Ice sports ==
=== Bandy ===
Australia used to be a member of the Federation of International Bandy, but has now exited. A national team was supposed to participate in the 2011 World Championship. The flag was even on the poster. However, a late cancellation was made because of the floodings. There was also speculation about participation in the first Asian championship in 2012, a tournament which did not in the end take place.

=== Curling ===
Curling facilities are limited in Australia. There was curling at Sydney Ice Arena in New South Wales, while curling also occurs in Melbourne and is also played in Brisbane. and at Cockburn Ice Arena, Perth, Western Australia.

=== Ice Hockey ===
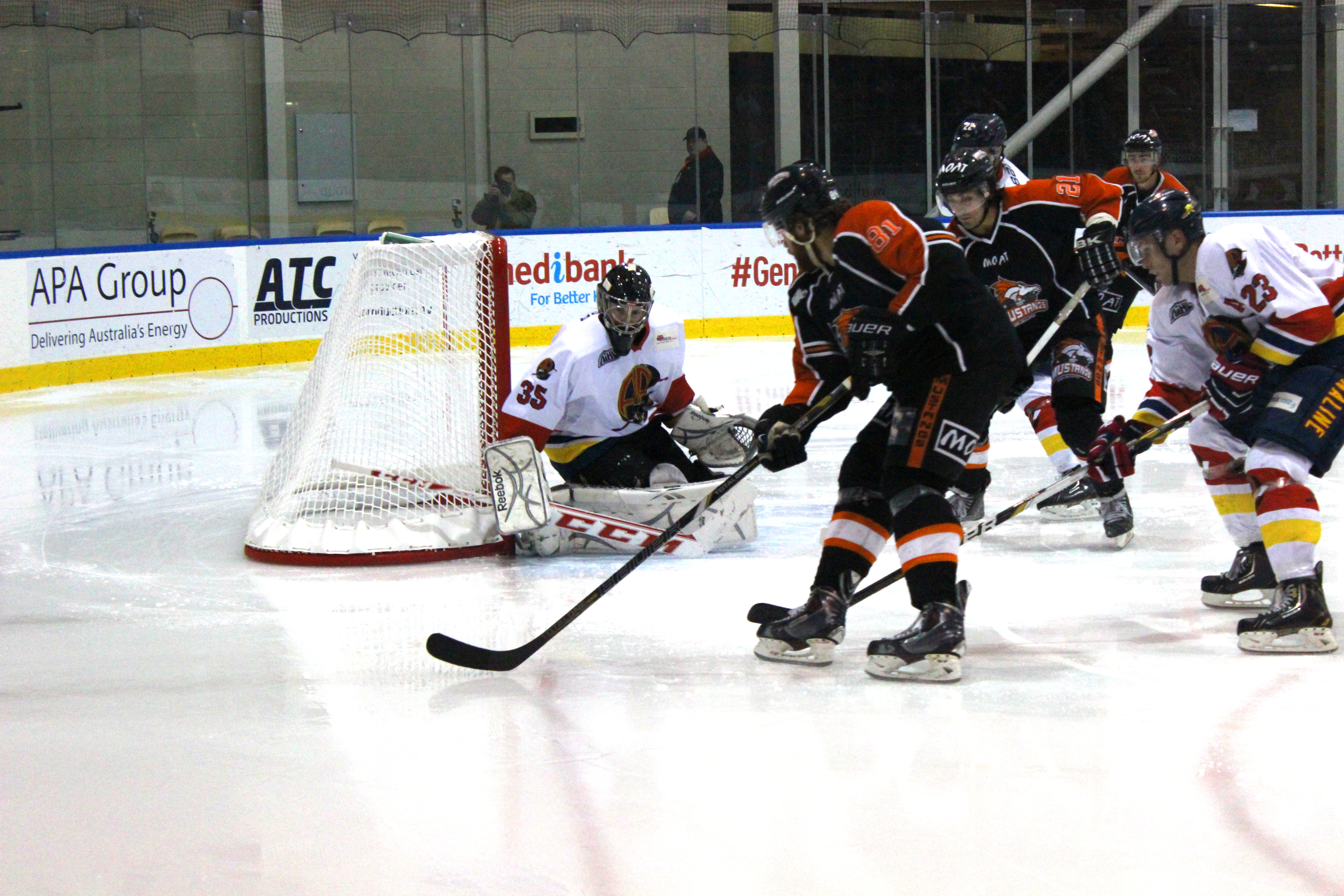
Melbourne Mustangs and Adelaide Adrenaline of the Australian Ice Hockey League. 14 Aug 2014

The first recorded game of ice hockey in Australia was on Tuesday 17 July 1906 and was between a Victorian representative team and the American sailors from the visiting American Warship the USS Baltimore. This game was held in the Melbourne Glaciarium, the Australian team were dressed in all white and the team from USS Baltimore wore white shirts with a large upper case black B on the front and centre of the chest and grey trousers with red socks. The skill level of the Australians was not seen to be up to the level of the Americans but the game was hard-fought and result of the game was a 1–1 tie.

Ice Hockey Australia is the official national governing body of ice hockey in Australia and is a member of the International Ice Hockey Federation. Its beginnings can be traced back to 12 September 1908 when the formation of the first ice hockey association in Australia occurred in a meeting at the Melbourne Glaciarium occurred directly after an evening ice hockey game between the Brighton Ice Hockey Club and the Melburnians, which resulted in a 2–2 tie. The meeting was for the purpose of organising a club for the following season

Australia owns the oldest ice hockey trophy outside of North America called the Goodall Cup, it was first awarded 4 September 1909 and donated by John Edwin Goodall. The Goodall Cup now resides in the Hockey Hall of Fame in Toronto, Canada.

Australia has a national hockey league called the Australian Ice Hockey League to represent the highest level of competition in the country, the Goodall Cup is awarded to the AIHL playoff champions. Australia has a national woman's league (Australian Women's Ice Hockey League) and junior league (Australian Junior Ice Hockey League). Along with the national leagues, each state and the Australian Capital Territory have league hockey. National tournaments are also held each year for 5 different age categories to represent their state in a weekend competition, the longest running is the Jim Brown Memorial Tournament which has existed since 1964.

=== Skating ===
Many major Australian cities have indoor ice rinks, enabling participation in some winter sports regardless of the city's climate - for example, subtropical Brisbane is a major short track speed skating hub for Australia. Sydney hosted the 1991 short track speed skating World Championships (in which Australia won the men's relay event), and the 2001 Goodwill Games, hosted in Brisbane, included figure skating. The Duke Trophy hosted annually by the Australian Amateur Ice Racing Council encourages interstate competition in short track speed skating.

Short-track speedskater Steven Bradbury won the 1,000 m event at the 2002 Winter Olympics. He was the first Australian, and first individual from the Southern Hemisphere, to win a Winter Olympic gold medal and was also part of the short track relay team that won Australia's first Winter Olympic medal (a bronze in 1994).

== Australia at the Winter Olympics ==
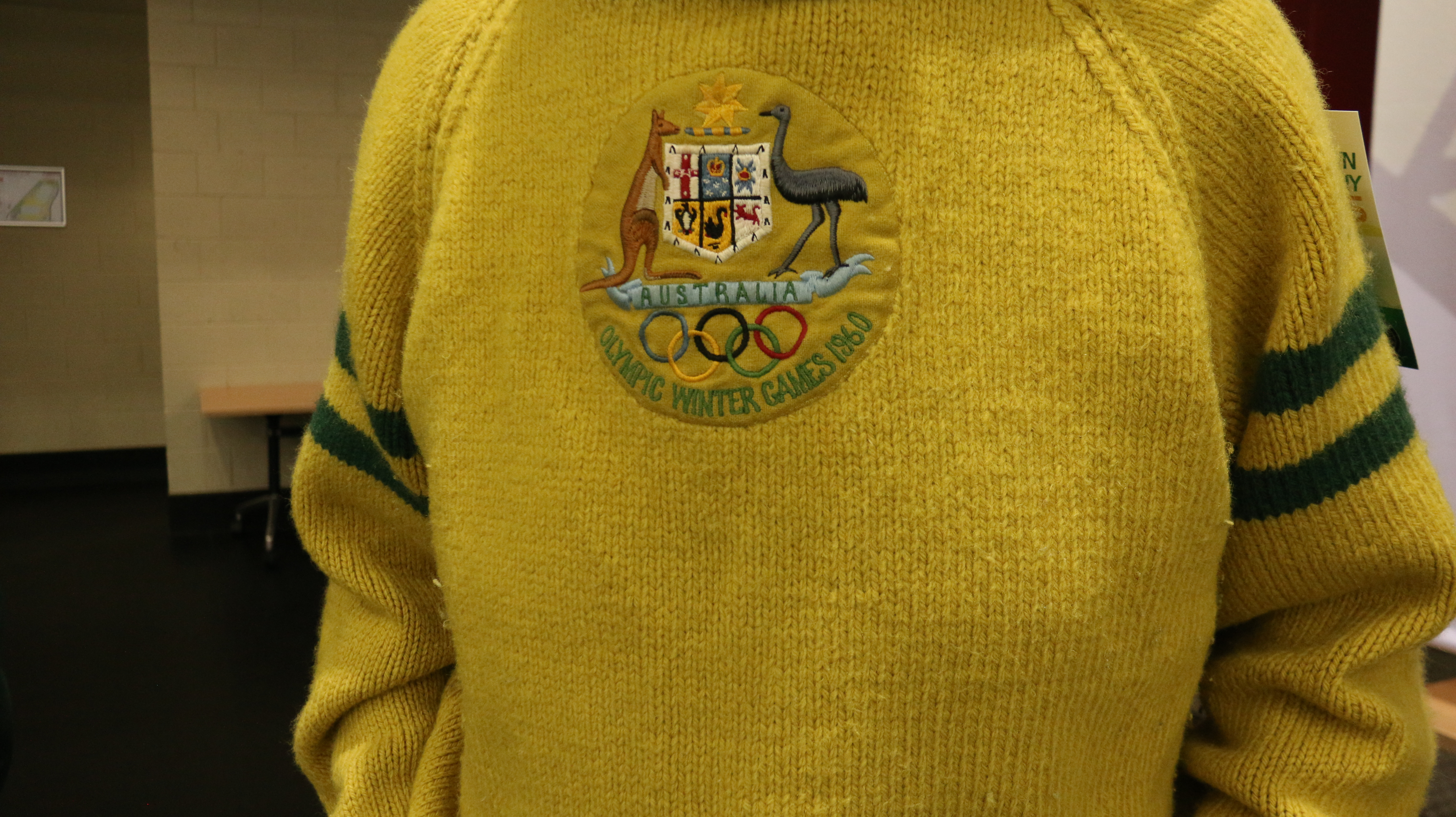
Original 1960 Australian Olympic ice hockey sweater worn by Vic Ekberg

Australia first competed in the Winter Olympic Games in 1936 and has taken part in every Winter Olympics since 1952. Australia first entered an ice hockey team in the 1960 Winter Olympics. It won its first Winter Olympic medal, a bronze, in 1994, and became the only southern hemisphere country to win Winter Olympic gold in 2002. Australia has competed in every Winter Paralympic Games, and has won medals at every Winter Paralympics since 1992.

Australian medals at the Winter Olympic Games

Year	Athletes	Sports	Gold	Silver	Bronze	Total
1994	27	9	0	0	1	1
1998	24	8	0	0	1	1
2002	27	5	2	0	0	2
2006	40	10	1	-	1	2

Australian medals at the Winter Paralympic Games

Year	Gold	Silver	Bronze	Total
1992	1	1	2	4
1994	3	2	4	9
1998	1	0	1	2
2002	6	1	0	7
2006	0	1	1	2

== See also ==
- Sport in Australia
- Ice Hockey Australia
- Australian Ice Hockey League
- Australian Women's Ice Hockey League
- Australian Junior Ice Hockey League
- Skiing in Australia
- Skeleton sport in Australia
- Skiing in Victoria
- Duke Trophy
