= Sonnpark =

Alpine training centre in Axams, Austria

Sonnpark is an alpine training centre and base set up in Axams, near Innsbruck, Austria. It started in 1993 as a joint venture between the Australian and Austrian Olympic Committees for both summer and winter sports. Colin Hickey said about Sonnpark "Yeah. It's great ... With that sort of back-up, we'd have given [the Europeans] a run for their money." Australia sold the base in 2002.
