= Leonard Duke =

Australian speed skater

Leonard 'Len' Charles Humphry Duke (1932–1984) was an Australian speed skater.

== Biography ==
Duke was born in Melbourne, grew up in the suburbs of Melbourne and took up skating at St. Moritz Ice Skating Palais on the Upper Esplanade, St. Kilda in 1946. As a young man he was interested in joining the Police force but at 5’10" was under the regulation height of 6 ft.

He became interested in speed skating & ice hockey and played in the Juniors for the Saints Monarchs, but speed skating was his main interest. With his longtime school friend David Morgan, in 1948 he became a founding member of the Melbourne Amateur Speed Skating Club, for which he wrote the constitution. He was later the first Secretary-Treasurer of the Australian Amateur Ice Racing Council. In the same year he won the Victorian Junior ¼ and ½ mile championships before going on to win the Australian Junior ¼ mile championship. He successfully defended his Victorian Junior ¼ mile title the following year.

Len won several Victorian and Australian titles over the years and at 17 he was a member of the 1951 Victorian team to go to Sydney to compete in the Australian Championships. That same week he won three Senior titles, ¼ mile, ½ mile and 1 mile, setting new Australian records for all three although still a Junior. These records are listed along with those of many other skaters’ in the Ampol Book of Sporting Records 1951–87. He also took the Rushall Trophy for being 'Victoria's best skater over all distances'. For a time was unable to race due to a serious bike accident after which he was encased in plaster from neck to waist for 6 months.

Len was eventually able to become a member of the Commonwealth Police Force in his 40s due to a reduction in the height requirement. Unfortunately, he was struck down in 1983 with a brain tumour at 51 and died 6 months later in March 1984.

The eponymous Duke Trophy was donated by Len Duke to the AAIRC in 1952 to encourage interstate competition in speed skating. In the early 2000s, his children returned his trophies to the Victorian Speed Skating Union, one of which was modified to become the Best & Fairest trophy for the Duke Perpetual competition.
