= Ian Chesterman =

Australian sports administrator

Ian Andrew Chesterman AM (born 17 April 1959) is an Australian sports administrator serving as the current president of the Australian Olympic Committee (AOC), having succeeded John Coates in 2022. Chesterman was re-elected unopposed for his second term in May 2025. He previously served as a vice president of the AOC, and the Chef de Mission of the Australian Team for the 2020 Tokyo Olympic Games.

Chesterman was elected as a Member of the International Olympic Committee at the Paris 2024 Olympic Games with his term commencing on January 1, 2025.

Before becoming the AOC President Chesterman served as a Vice President of the AOC from 2016 to 2022 and has been a member of the Executive since 2001.

Across his career Chesterman has led a total of seven Australian Olympic Teams as Chef de Mission, six Winter Olympics from 1998 to 2018 as well as the Tokyo 2020 Olympic Games.

He is the first Australian to head both a summer and winter Olympic Team as Chef de Mission, and the first to lead a total of seven Olympic teams, eclipsing Geoff Henke (six winter teams from 1976–1994) and John Coates (six summer teams from 1988–2008).

Chesterman was also Chef de Mission of the Australian Team at the 2016 Winter Youth Olympics in Lillehammer.

He was made a Life Member of the Australian Olympic Committee in May 2018 and a Member of the Order of Australia in 2019.

Currently a resident of Launceston, Tasmania, Chesterman is managing director of Sportcom Pty Ltd, a communications and events company he founded in 1988.

== See also ==
- Australia at the Winter Olympics
