= Skeleton sport in Australia =

- Country: Australia
- Governing body: Sliding Sports Australia
- National team: Australia

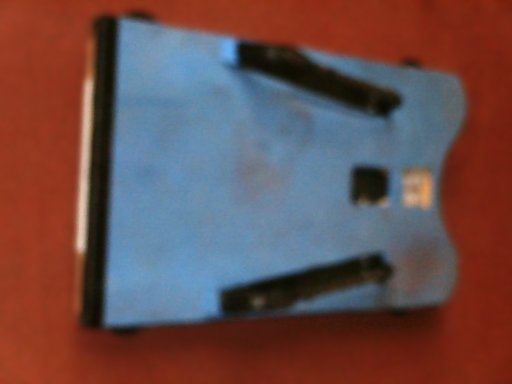
A practice skeleton sled with wheels underneath

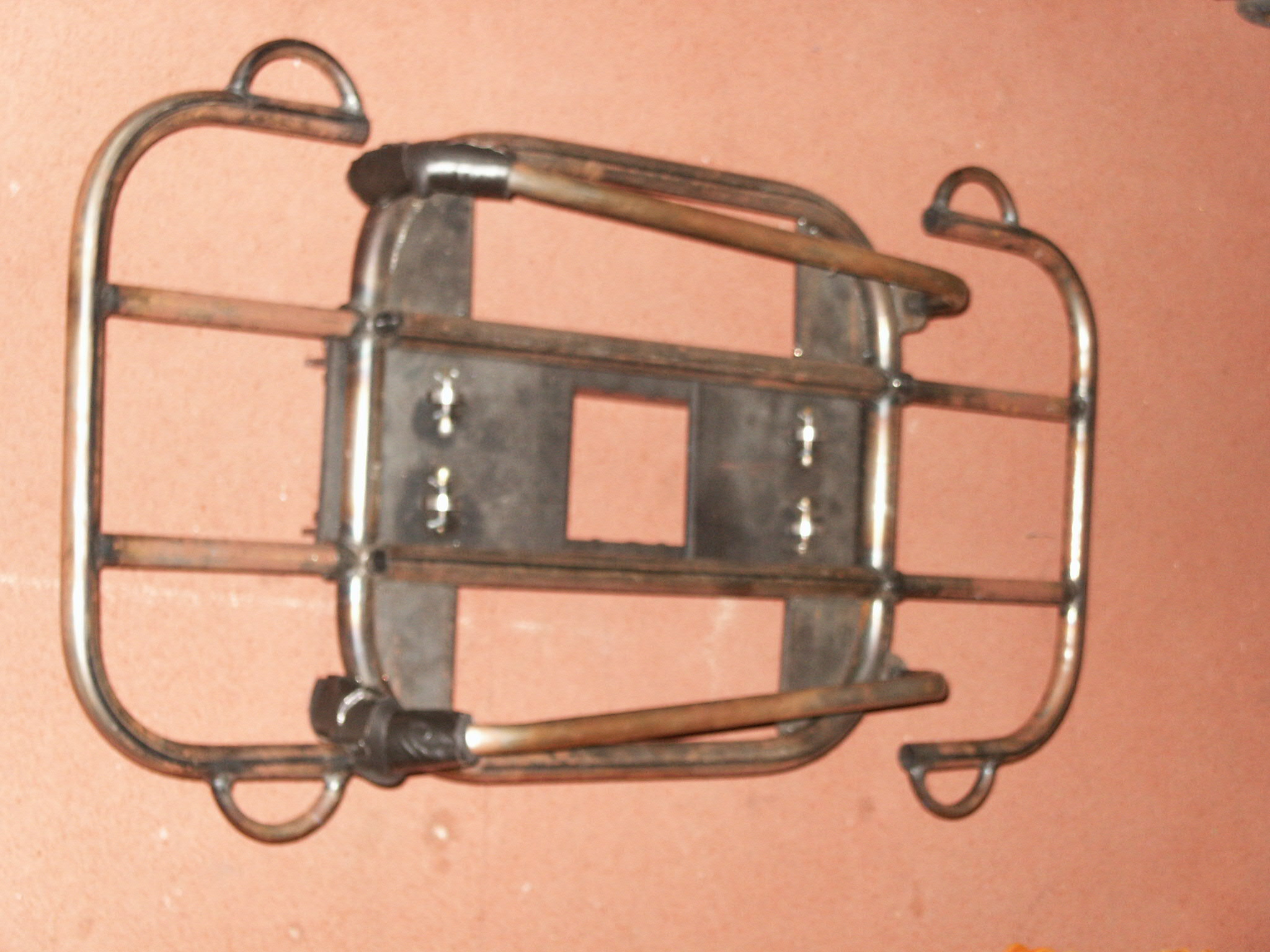
A practice skeleton without wheels - only used when the athlete is on a treadmill

Australia created a female team in the sport of skeleton in the hope of winning a medal at the 2006 Winter Olympics. Physiologists Dr David Martin and Dr Angus Ross looked at a list of winter sports. They regarded the women's division of the sport as not currently being strongly competitive, therefore athletes in non-winter sports who possess the traits that would make a good skeleton athlete could win a medal.

Almost 100 athletes from a variety of sports, including athletics and Surf lifesaving sports, were invited to be tested by the Australian Institute of Sport for their suitability in the sport.

The tests included their ability to sprint over 30 metres, body type and attitude. Training included practicing starts using a skeleton sled with wheels underneath. 35 people were selected for a training camp, and 10 comprised a squad that competed in the sport internationally.

The athletes tested their wind resistance in Monash University's wind tunnel to see which body positions would be the most aerodynamic. The university's aerodynamicist said that the testing enabled the athletes to reduce drag by between five and ten percent.

Five athletes were selected for the shadow team.

- Shaun Boyle, born 30 January 1971. The only male athlete in the skeleton shadow team.
- Melissa Hoar, surf lifesaving sportswoman. Dalmeny resident.
- Bindee Johnston (formerly Bindee Goon Chew), 100m and 200m sprinter. Townsville resident.
- Emma Lincoln-Smith, surf lifesaving sportswoman.
- Michelle Steele, surf lifesaving sportswoman. Born 8 March 1986. Bundaberg resident.

Michelle Steele was selected for Australia's women's slot after time trials in Königssee, Germany. She came 13th at the 2006 Winter Olympics. Boyle also competed at the 2006 Games, finishing 22nd in the men's event.

Another recruitment drive occurred in mid-2006. Candidates will be assessed on spatial and body awareness, useful in driving a sled, as well as sprinting ability. Ten candidates will attend a training camp, and up to five will join Steele, Lincoln-Smith and Hoar in the national squad.

Three Australian sliders competed at the 2010 Winter Olympics in Vancouver: Anthony Deane, who finished in 23rd place in the men's competition, Lincoln-Smith, who placed 10th in the women's event, and Hoar, who finished 12th in the women's event. The best results for Australians in top-flight skeleton competition as of mid-2013 were Steele's sixth place at the FIBT World Championships 2013 and second places for Lincoln-Smith and Lucy Chaffer during the 2011–12 Skeleton World Cup.

== See also ==
- Winter sport in Australia
- Australia at the Winter Olympics
- Australia at the 2006 Winter Olympics
- Skeleton
- Faisal Faisal, an Iraqi skeleton athlete living in Sydney, Australia
