= Robert Chisholm (sports administrator) =

Australian sports administrator 1910–1998

Robert George Chisholm (1910 – 26 June 1998) was an Australian sports administrator. He was the manager of the Australian teams that competed at the 1952 and 1956 Winter Olympics.

Australia had first competed at the 1936 Olympics before the Second World War, when one athlete participated without support staff. Australia did not compete in 1948 after the resumption of the Olympics and in 1952, support staff were present for the first time; Chisholm was the first manager of an Australian Winter Olympic team. He oversaw three figure skaters, three alpine skiers and two cross country skiers in Oslo, Norway. All finished in the bottom half of their events and seven finished in the bottom 20%. The lack of administrative attention was highlighted when Chisholm incorrectly declared that the campaign was Australia's first at the Winter Olympics.

Chisholm returned to lead the team to Cortina D'Ampezzo in Italy. Chisholm again mistakenly noted in his official report that it was Australia's second participation, forgetting the delegations sent in 1936. There were ten athletes in total; five alpine skiers, four figure skaters and a solitary long track speed skater. Colin Hickey, a "rink rat" who was overlooked for ice hockey when he was young because of his small frame, came seventh in the 500 and 1000 metres speed skating, on his second Olympic campaign. However, the others all finished in the bottom half of their events, while the pairs figure skating combination of Mervyn Bower and Jacqueline Mason failed to take to the ice after Bower was injured.

Chisholm married twice, having two daughters with his second wife. He died on 26 June 1998.
