= Ben Mates =

Australian snowboarder

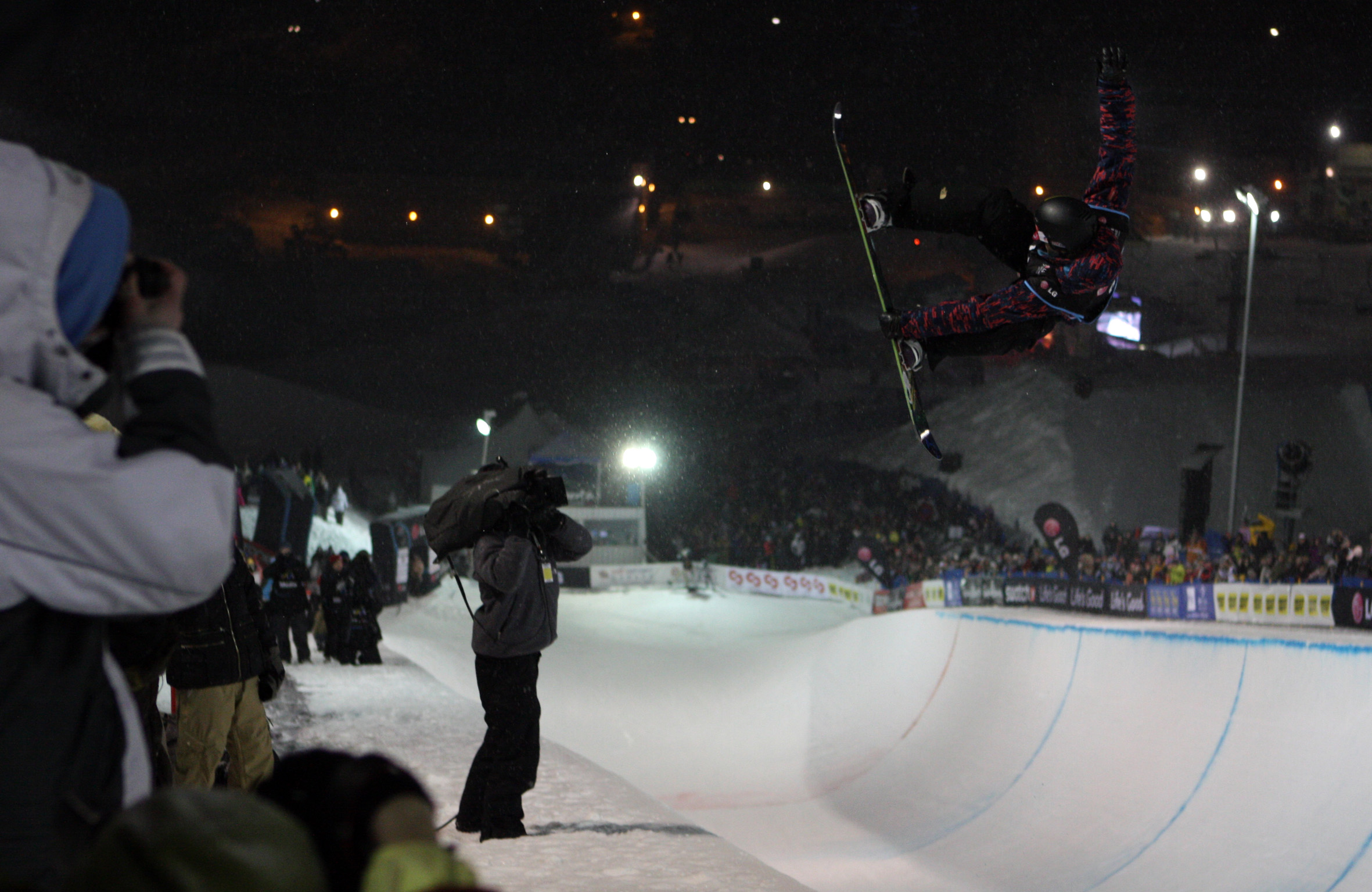

Ben Mates (born 28 October 1983) is an Australian half-pipe snowboarder. He competed in the 2006 Winter Olympics and placed 43rd and 36th in his qualification runs. He ranked 42nd out of 44 competitors and did not make the final.

Mates also competed in the 2010 Winter Olympics and scored 28.3 on his first run and 29.6 on his second to leave him in ninth position.
