= Hal Nerdal =

Norwegian born Australian former skier (1927–2023)

Personal information
- Born: Herlof Nerdal; 22 September 1927 Dalsgrende, Nordland, Norway
- Died: 11 September 2023 (aged 95) Brisbane, Queensland, Australia

Sport
- Country: Australia
- Sport: Nordic Combined

Hal Nerdal (22 September 1927 – 11 September 2023) was an Australian skier who competed at the 1960 Winter Olympics in the Nordic combined. As of the 2026 Winter Olympics, he is the only Australian representative in the disciplines Olympic history.

== Early life ==
Hal Nerdal was born in Dalsgrende, a village near Mo i Rana in Northern Norway. He was the youngest of ten children. He was a keen skier and runner, training in both.

In 1951, he moved to Australia to work as a carpenter on the Snowy Mountains Scheme, helping to build the Guthega Dam on the Snowy River in New South Wales. He remained in Australia and moved to Canberra, where he joined the local YMCA ski club in 1958.

== Skiing career ==
After joining a local ski club in Canberra in 1958, Nerdal began competing in cross-country events, with the talent level high due to the large number of Norwegian's who had also moved to the area to work on the Snowy Mountains Scheme.

During qualification for the 1960 Winter Olympics in Squaw Valley, he competed in events in Victoria and New South Wales, winning the final event that qualified him for the Nordic Combined, where he would finish in 31st place. In doing so he became Australia's first and as of the 2026 Winter Olympics, only competitor in the discipline.

He would continue to compete nationally after the Olympics, become the national champion between 1959 and 1962.

== Personal life and death ==
Nerdal married his wife Jean in 1955 and had two daughters.

He would move to Brisbane later in life, where he would die on 11 September 2023.

== Sources ==
- The Compendium: Official Australian Olympic Statistics 1896–2002. Australian Olympic Committee. 2003. pp. 215–227. ISBN 0-7022-3425-7.
