= Joh Shaw =

Australian snowboarder

Johanna Shaw (born 14 May 1982), known as Joh Shaw, is an Australian snowboarder, competing in the parallel giant slalom. She competed in the 2006 Winter Olympics and was ranked 29th out of 30 competitors and did not make the final.

She competed at the 2010 Vancouver Olympics and finished 19th. This was after she suffered a potential season-ending hamstring injury after her first race of the season which she finished 4th in the World Cup at Landgraff. The rest of the 2009/2010 world cup season for Joh was interrupted due to her injury which meant she missed over half of the season and spend the time back in Australia conducting intensive rehabilitation which included 3 seasons a day of dry land training and physiotherapy. Even Christmas for Joh was spent training and trying to get herself back fit and ready for the Olympics, which the effects of the hamstring injury continued to hamper her progress.
