= Duke Trophy =

Australian short-track speed racing competition

- Sport: Speedskating
- Founded: 1952
- No. of teams: 4
- Continent: Australia
- Most recent champion: (Victoria (state)) Victoria

The Duke Trophy is an annual inter-state short track speed skating competition in Australia.

== History ==
The Duke Trophy was made in 1952 and donated to the Australian Amateur Ice Racing Council by Len Duke, the first Secretary/Treasurer of the AAIRC, with the help of an old school friend Dave Morgan. Both started skating at St Moritz Ice Palais in St Kilda in June 1946 and eventually represented Victoria in interstate competition.

There had been interstate racing between NSW and Victoria for many years, initially managed by the Ice Hockey Association as an additional attraction to the interstate hockey matches at the time, however there was nothing tangible to record the winning teams in these competitions. By 1951 the AAIRC was formed and had separate associations for Speed Skating in Victoria and New South Wales and even for a short time in Tasmania, which was the venue for the 1952 Australian Championships. Duke felt there should be a dedicated trophy for Interstate Racing, especially after the Victorian team was very successful in Hobart in 1952.

The resulting award was named and inscribed "The Australian Amateur Ice Racing Council Trophy for Interstate Racing". The trophy features a silver statuette of a skater on the top, mirroring the design of the Australian Championship award that Duke had won the year before. Around 1957 it was suggested that the interstate racing trophy be renamed the "Duke Trophy" to keep his name in the sport following his retirement.

Duke's own 1951 Australian Championship trophy featured a silver speed skater mounted on a globe of the world. This trophy was donated back to the VSSU (which later became VIRA) after Len's death, and has since been made into the best and fairest award for the Duke Trophy competition.

In early days of the competition, the tournament was run on the Queen's Birthday weekend in June. It was later moved to the last weekend of July. In 2014, however, competitors and officials recognized that this time was poorly suited to the international competition season, resulting in many elite skaters being unavailable to compete in the Duke Trophy. Plans are currently underway to move the date to September from 2016 onwards, placing the competition at the end of the speed skating season.

== Format of the competition ==
The original format was a competition between 6 senior men and 2 junior men with races ranging from quarter mile, through half mile to 1 mile. Two skaters per State competed in each race, except for the 1 mile in which there were three skaters per state. The Juniors skated quarter and half mile only, then there was also a 2-mile Relay for the seniors. By 1955 a 2-mile race for Seniors was included. The whole program was held over a half hour period on the last night of the Australian Championships.

Ladies came later in the early 1960s – initially there were only three – with a special trophy for the Ladies Relay donated by Teddi Jenkins of Victoria, a previous Victorian and National titleholder.

Due to numerous factors, including a marked decline in the number of competitive skaters in some states, Australian Ice Racing officials worked during 2014 and 2015 to amend the rules and format of the competition. The new rules took effect in 2015, with the aim of promoting competition, accessibility and excitement whilst minimizing potential imbalance in team sizes.

The current format, hosted across two days, sees skaters in five age categories compete over a range of distances (now measured in metric) from 222m to 3000m. The competition also includes 1500m, 3000m and 5000m relays. Points are awarded to state teams based on the finishing order of each race. The overall points winners are awarded the Duke Trophy, with additional awards given to the individual skaters deemed "best and fairest" or "most improved".

Rules allow for "Vacant Position Skaters" to fill the field in the event that any state lack a competitor for a given race - this ruling allows for all races to be run with a full field, as well as providing the VP skaters with competition experience. VP Skaters cannot earn points for their state.

Under the new rules, women do not skate in separate divisions; all races are mixed gender. In order to encourage women to participate, female skaters are awarded 125% of normal points for every placing.

== Awards ==
The eponymous Duke Trophy is awarded to the state team with the highest overall score.

In addition to the Duke Trophy itself, a number of other perpetual trophies are awarded in the competition:

- The Len Duke Best & Fairest Award. This trophy was originally the 1951 Australian Championship Award won by Len Duke. It was rediscovered and donated back to the competition by the Duke family in the early 2000s to be repurposed as a perpetual award presented to the skater deemed to have achieved the best performance through honourable participation.
- The Colin Coates Spirit of the Duke Award. This trophy, donated in 2002 by Australian Olympian Colin Coates, is presented to the skater deemed to have promoted the sport and captured the spirit of the competition.
- The Denis Pennington Most Improved Award presented to the competitor displaying the greatest improvement in speed and/or technique. In exceptional circumstances, more than one skater can share this award: In 2015, the Pennington Blades was presented to the entire Victorian state team, having secured their first Duke Trophy win for 30 years.
- The Teddi Jenkins Shield is presented to the winning ladies' relay team. From 2015, all races were open to racers of either gender, and the Teddi Jenkins Shield was not awarded.

Due to their age and fragile condition, attempts have been made in recent years to limit the transportation of the physical awards. They are therefore kept and maintained in Queensland, and not taken to the winning state between competitions.

== Results ==
Duke Trophy
Year	Host	Champions	Runners-up	3rd place
2024	Queensland	Queensland	Event held 27-28 July 2024	
2023	Queensland	(Victoria (state)) Victoria	Event held 29-30 July 2023	
2020	Queensland	Cancelled due to Covid restrictions		
2019	New South Wales	New South Wales	(Victoria (state)) Victoria	Queensland
2018	Queensland	New South Wales	(Victoria (state)) Victoria	Queensland
2017	New South Wales	New South Wales	(Victoria (state)) Victoria	Queensland
2016	(Victoria (state)) Victoria	(Victoria (state)) Victoria	New South Wales	Queensland
2015	Queensland	(Victoria (state)) Victoria	New South Wales	Queensland
2014	New South Wales	New South Wales	(Victoria (state)) Victoria	Western Australia
2012	Queensland	New South Wales	Queensland	(Victoria (state)) Victoria
2011	New South Wales	New South Wales	Queensland	(Victoria (state)) Victoria
2010	Queensland	New South Wales	Queensland	(Victoria (state)) Victoria
2009	New South Wales	New South Wales	Queensland	(Victoria (state)) Victoria
2008	Queensland	New South Wales	Queensland	(Victoria (state)) Victoria
2007	New South Wales	Queensland	New South Wales	(Victoria (state)) Victoria
2006	Queensland	Queensland	New South Wales	(Victoria (state)) Victoria
2005	New South Wales	Queensland	New South Wales	(Victoria (state)) Victoria
2004	Queensland	Queensland	New South Wales	(Victoria (state)) Victoria
2003	Queensland	Queensland	(Victoria (state)) Victoria	New South Wales
2002	Queensland	Queensland	(Victoria (state)) Victoria	New South Wales

Note that the competition was not held in 2013 due to many competitors making preparations for the competitive season and upcoming winter olympics.

== See also ==
- Sport in Australia
