= Olympic Winter Institute of Australia =

Sports Institution

The Olympic Winter Institute of Australia (OWIA) is an Olympic & federal government-funded elite sports training institution of Australia for the purpose of training athletes and coaches in sports involved in the Winter Olympics.

The Australian Olympic Committee (AOC) in co operation with the Australian Institute of Sport (AIS) formed the Australian Institute of Winter Sports after the 1998 Winter Olympics. The organisation was renamed to the Olympic Winter Institute of Australia on 1 July 2001. It provides training in alpine skiing, freestyle skiing (including aerial and mogul), snowboarding, short track speed skating and figure skating. It also became a partner with the AIS in skeleton (toboganning).

It was given a million-dollar annual budget and for the first time, Australia had a federal government-funded full-time training program to accompany the AIS. The inaugural chairman was Geoff Henke who was the Australian Winter Olympic team manager from 1976 to 1994, and who was credited with improving Australia's performance in winter sports by making it a higher priority among his fellow administrators. This led to a steady rise in the number of Australians who have won medals at World Cup events in the immediate years after the OWIA's creation.

The AOC is the peak body responsible for Australia's participation at the Olympics. Aside from funding the participation at the Olympics, it also provides money for the training and preparation of athletes. This occurs through funding of the OWIA, grants for athletes to travel overseas to compete, and by providing monetary awards to athletes and their coaches if they win medals at World Cup events or World Championships in the lead up to the Olympics. The funding of the OWIA by the AOC varied by year, but has been at A$1,000,000 per year for over 6 years. Through the Australian Sports Commission, the federal government also sponsors OWIA to the tune of more than a million dollars a year.

In 2009, the OWIA lobbied the government to increase its annual budget from A$2.1m to A$29.4m (which is still only a fraction of the A$132m that Canada, the host of the 2010 Olympics is spending.) which was not successful. The OWIA secured an additional A$1m taking its budget to A$3.1m in 2010. Australia aimed to win two medals in 2010; it left the games with 3.
