= Steven Lee =

Australian alpine skier (born 1962)

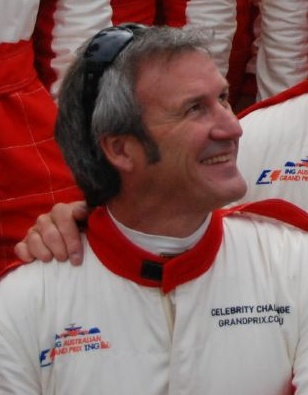
- Steven Lee in March 2008

Personal information
- Born: 6 August 1962 (age 64) Falls Creek, Victoria, Australia

Sport
- Sport: Skiing
- Club: Falls Creek Race Club

Steven Lee (born 6 August 1962) is an Australian alpine skier. He competed in the 1984, 1988 and 1992 Winter Olympics, and had a competitive career lasting just on 25 years. He is the second of only 3 Australian skiers ever to claim victory on the Alpine World Cup circuit. He has also done sports commentating for channels 7, 9 and 10, co-owns Chill Factor magazine, and is a national selector and president of Falls Creek Race Club. He has worked in movies with Roger Moore and Jackie Chan.

== Media biography ==
Lee has been the television host and commentator, especially in winter sports.

His most recent major event was the 2014 Sochi Winter Olympic Games for Australian TV Channel 10. Previously he called the 2006 Winter Olympics. Paired with Bruce McAvaney for alpine, and Matt White for freestyle, they called all the skiing events, including Dale Begg-Smith's gold medal performance in mogul skiing.

His other TV work includes the 98 Nagano Olympics, 2000 Sydney Olympics, the 2002 Salt Lake Olympics and the 1999, 2001, 2003, 2005 alpine and freestyle world championships.

He was host and commentator of 200 plus White Circus TV shows airing on the Seven Network from 1999 to 2002, covering all FIS (Federation of international ski) events, alpine, freestyle, snowboard and ski jumping.

He commentated the 2000 Australian Mountain Bike Champs.

He has also been a consultant on other winter sport coverage.

== Magazines and online media ==
Lee is co editor/owner of Chill Factor ski magazine www.chillfactor.com. Previous to Chill Factor, he was a contributing writer for all ski magazine publications over the last 20 years. He is co owner and editor of www.surfingworld.com.au.

== Film ==
Lee did stunt work for Jackie Chan film First Strike, produced at Falls Creek, as a lead stunt skier and snowmobiler.

He did stunt ski work for Willy Bogner's James Bond spoof Fire Ice & Dynamite.

RAP Films feature skier for movies Skiers Dream, Into the Snow Zone & Return to the Snow Zone.

== Ski competition biography ==
World Cup, 1981–92

- Victory in World Cup Super-G, Furano, Japan. View Official Results
- 20 top 15 finishes in World Cup downhill and Super G.
- Best World Ranking: 13th.

3 Winter Olympic Games: 1984, 1988, 1992

- Best Finish 11th: in combined Downhill 1992.

6 World Championships

- 1982–1991. Best finishes: 8th place in Super G Vail 1989, 10th in Downhill Bormio 1985, 9th in combination Downhill Bormio 1985.

US Pro Tour 1993, 1995

- 1/4 Finalist in Jackson Hole GS, Round of 16 in Schladming GS, Heavenly Valley GS, Stratton Mt SL.
- Retired winning the most improved ranking title, lifting ranking to 26th overall in the world and 17th in GS.
- Head of Racer Committee responsible for the introduction of Downhill races to the 1994/95 tour, and was president elect of the 1995/96 racer board.

King of the Mountain Downhill series 1996-97

- Invited to compete in Pro Downhill tour made up of World cup winners, Olympic and World Championship

medal winners. With results of 3rd, 2nd, 2nd and 1st in the finals Team Commonwealth (made up of Lee and Martin Bell of Great Britain) won the International team cup.

King of the Mountain Downhill series, 1997–98

- Team commonwealth was 4th in the overall standings.

=== Endurance racing ===
- 50K of Coronet. 7/2000 & 7/2001
  - 16-hour non-stop race in New Zealand.
  - Team members, included AJ Bear, Craig Branch.
  - Finished 3rd.
- 24hrs of Aspen, World champs of Endurance racing. 12/2000.
  - 24hr non-stop race in Aspen Colorado.
  - Team Australia also included Shaun Turner.
  - Finished 3rd.
- 24hrs of Aspen, World champs of Endurance racing. 12/2001.
  - 24hr non-stop race in Aspen Colorado.
  - Team Australia included Al Guss.
  - Finished 4th.
- Retired from competitive ski racing 2001.

=== World Cup, World Champ and Olympic results ===
- 16 February 1992 – Val d'Isere FRA Olympic Winter Games Super G 30
- 11 February 1992 – Val d'Isere FRA Olympic Winter Games Combined 19
- 11 February 1992 – Val d'Isere FRA FIS Race Slalom 22
- 10 February 1992 – Val d'Isere FRA FIS Race Downhill 14
- 8 February 1989 – Vail USA FIS World Championships Super G 8
- 11 March 1988 – Beaver Creek USA FIS World Cup Downhill 14
- 15 February 1988 – CalgaryDownhill CAN Olympic Winter Games Downhill 19
- 25 January 1988 – Leukerbad SUI FIS World Cup Super G 9
- 24 January 1988 – Leukerbad SUI FIS World Cup Downhill 15
- 17 January 1988 – Bad Kleinkircheim AUT FIS World Cup Combined 13
- 1 February 1987 – Crans Montana SUI FIS World Championships Combined 15
- 1 February 1987 – Crans Montana SUI FIS Race Downhill 11
- 7 February 1986 – St. Anton AUT FIS World Cup Combined 14
- 19 January 1986 – Kitzbuhel AUT FIS World Cup Combined 10
- 3 March 1985 – Furano JPN FIS World Cup Super G 1
- 2 March 1985 – Furano JPN FIS World Cup Downhill 7
- 3 February 1985 – Bormio ITA FIS World Championships Downhill 10
- 1 February 1985 – Bormio ITA FIS Race Downhill 9
- 19 January 1985 – Wengen SUI FIS World Cup Downhill 12
- 12 January 1985 – Kitzbuhel AUT FIS World Cup Downhill 13
- 4 March 1984 – Aspen USA FIS World Cup Downhill 12
- 16 February 1984 – Sarajevo JUG Olympic Winter Games Downhill 19
- 2 February 1984 – Cortina d'Ampezzo ITA FIS World Cup Downhill 9
- 21 January 1984 – Kitzbuhel AUT FIS World Cup Downhill 13
- 15 January 1984 – Wengen SUI FIS World Cup Downhill 6
- 9 December 1983 – Val d'Isere FRA FIS World Cup Downhill 11
- 11 February 1983 – Markstein FRA FIS World Cup Combined 8
- 6 February 1983 – St. Anton AUT FIS World Cup Combined 6
- 21 January 1983 – Kitzbuhel AUT FIS World Cup Downhill 10
- 5 February 1982 – Schladming AUT FIS Race Downhill 15

== Health ==
On 6 September 2020, Steve Lee suffered a major stroke at his home in Falls Creek.

He was moved to a rehab facility in Wangaratta and will need ongoing 24/7 care.
