= Colin Hickey =

Australian speed skater

Colin Edward Hickey (3 July 1931 – 13 January 1999) was an Australian speed skater. He represented Australia at the 1952, 1956 and 1960 Winter Olympics. His seventh place in the 1956 Winter Olympics was Australia's best result until 1976.

He was born in Fairfield, Victoria.

Hickey became a "rink rat" when his father took him to the Glaciarium in Melbourne. "I felt an affinity with it" he recalled, saying "To do it well is to feel like a bird flying." He earned the money to buy skates from selling newspapers. To get to the Glacarium from his place in Fairfield, he had to walk, take a bus and then a train. He tried ice hockey, but because of his small frame (he grew up to be 162 centimetres and weigh 56 kilograms), he was overlooked, and took up speed skating.

He took a ship to Europe to reach the speed skating hub of Norway. He worked as a lumberjack, and learned to speak the local language. "We did it hard, lived maybe two weeks at a time on just museli. It was difficult, but I had some of the best times of my life then. What was good was that they [the Australian authorities] had no control over me. We just did it all by the seat of our pants. All they'd do was tell me what times I had to do to qualify for selection, and it would be up to me." He found changing from indoor skating in Australia to skating outside in Norway a major change "It was like going from ping-pong to lawn tennis, from dirt-track to Grand Prix ... the outdoor was so much more demanding, in terms of strength and technique."

He said that conditions for Australian Winter Olympians used to be basic:

We didn't get a uniform. I never had an Australian blazer once in three Olympics. In 1952, because King George had died, they issued us with a black armband and tie for the opening ceremony. Nothing else. You wore it with whatever you had. I had a green sweater and ski slacks. In 1956 I was issued with no gear at all, even though I was the best-performed member of the team by about a hundred per cent. I couldn't march without any kind of uniform, so I stayed in the hotel. In 1960 they gave us a duffle coat and a sweater and that covered everything you had. That was it. You had to look after yourself.

Talking in 1993 about Sonnpark, a joint Australian-Austrian facility for winter and summer sports, he said "Yeah. It's great ... I reckon it would have made life a bit easier in the old days. With that sort of back-up, we'd have given them [the Europeans] a run for their money."

== See also ==
- Australia at the 1952 Winter Olympics
- Australia at the 1956 Winter Olympics
- Australia at the 1960 Winter Olympics
