= Skiing in Australia =

Overview of skiing practiced in Australia

- Country: Australia
- Governing body: Snow Australia
- National team: Australia

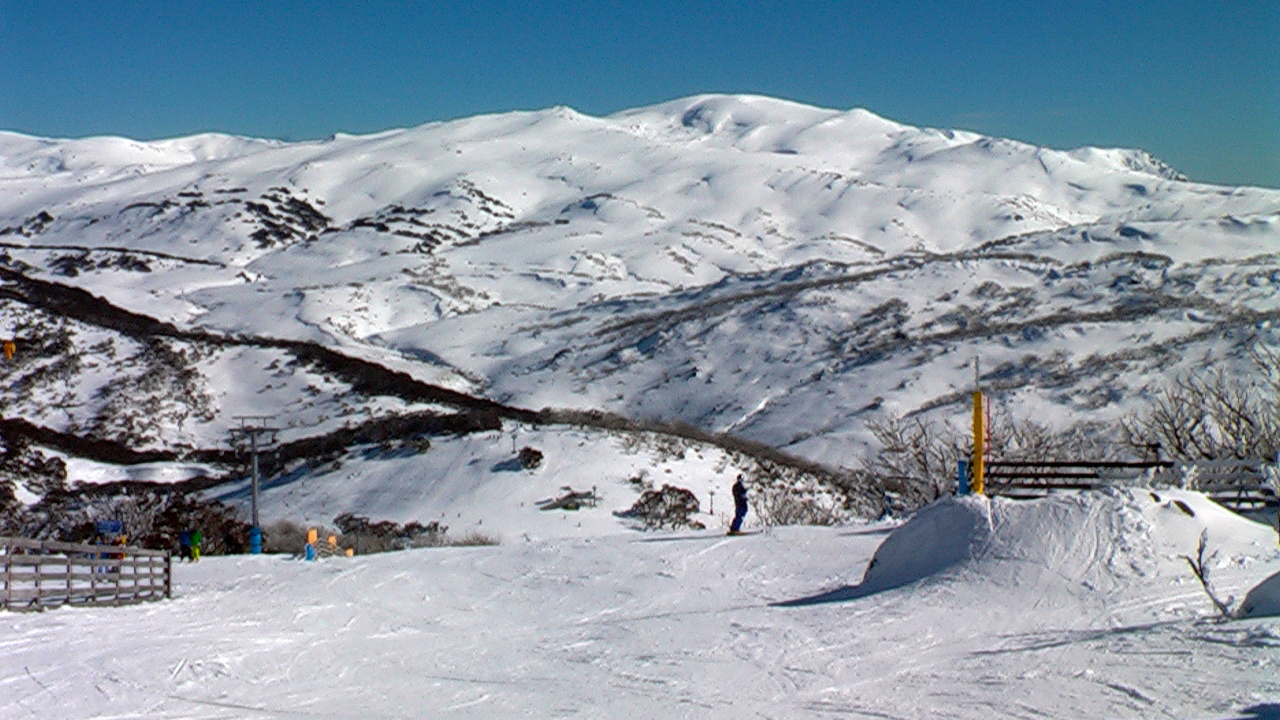
Guthega, NSW is one of the four bases of Perisher, Australia's largest ski resort.

Skiing in Australia takes place in the Australian Alps in the states of New South Wales, Victoria and the Australian Capital Territory as well as in the mountains of the island state Tasmania, during the Southern Hemisphere winter.

Skiing began in Australia at the goldrush town of Kiandra, New South Wales, in 1861. The first ski tow was constructed on the Mount Buffalo plateau, Victoria, in 1936. Australian skiers competed in the Winter Olympics for the first time in Oslo 1952 and have competed in all subsequent Games, winning medals at every Games since 1998. Malcolm Milne became the first non-European to win a ski race world cup in 1969, and Olympic medalists include Zali Steggall, Alisa Camplin, Dale Begg-Smith, Lydia Lassila and David Morris in skiing and Torah Bright, Scotty James in snowboarding.

Australia has extensive skiable terrain during the southern hemisphere winter in the south eastern states and Australian Capital Territory, between elevations of around 1250 m to 2200 m. Elevation of the snowfields in Australia varies with latitude; however, viable winter snows are generally found above 1500 m: Perisher Valley Ski resort has Australia’s highest lifted point on Mount Perisher of 2042m ASL and a base elevation 1720m ASL. Kiandra, in the Northern Skifields, has an elevation of 1400 m, while Mount Mawson near Hobart, Tasmania, is at 1250 m.

Australia has five major downhill ski resorts: Perisher and Thredbo in New South Wales and Mount Buller, Falls Creek and Mount Hotham in Victoria. Smaller downhill resorts such as Selwyn Snow Resort and Charlotte Pass in New South Wales, Mount Baw Baw in Victoria, and Ben Lomond and Mount Mawson in Tasmania provide a more relaxed experience than the busy major resorts and are popular with novice skiers and families. Cross-country skiing is popular in Kosciuszko National Park, the Alpine National Park, Yarra Ranges National Park, Baw Baw National Park, and Mount Buffalo National Park. It is also sometimes possible within Namadgi National Park of the ACT and in the Tasmanian Wilderness.

== Snow conditions ==
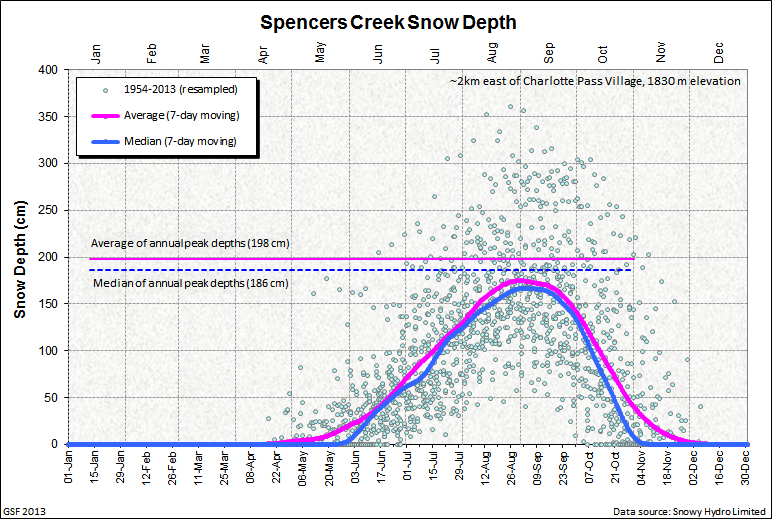
Spencers Creek average snow depth chart from Snowy Hydro

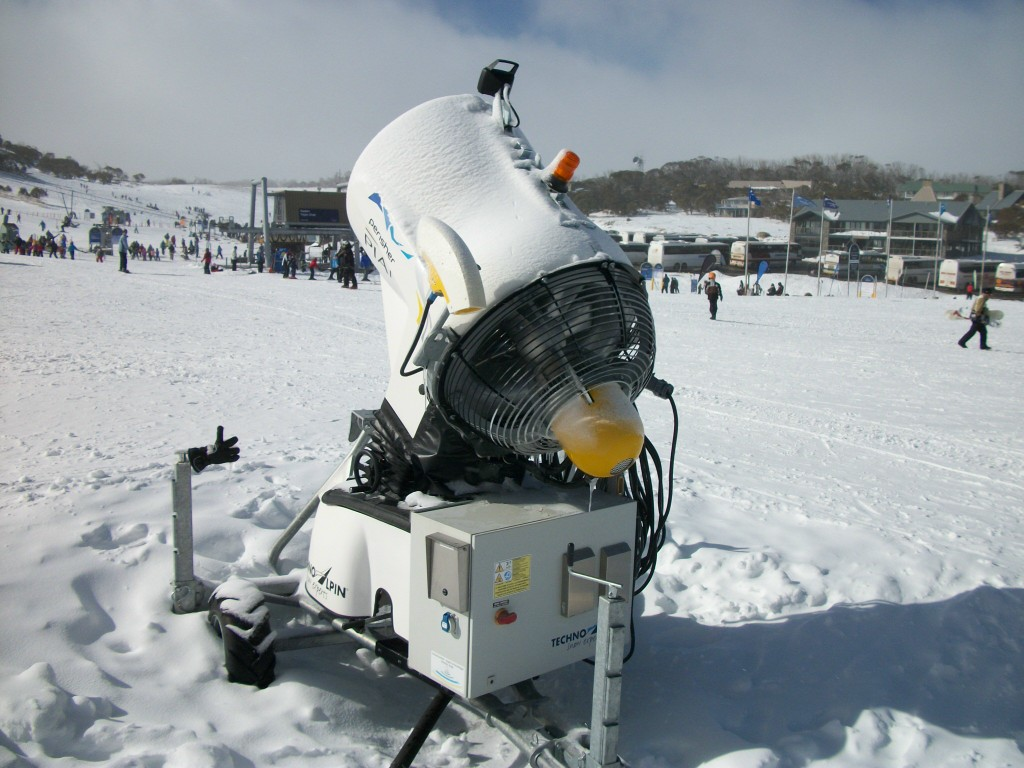
Snowmaking machine at Smiggin Holes, New South Wales.

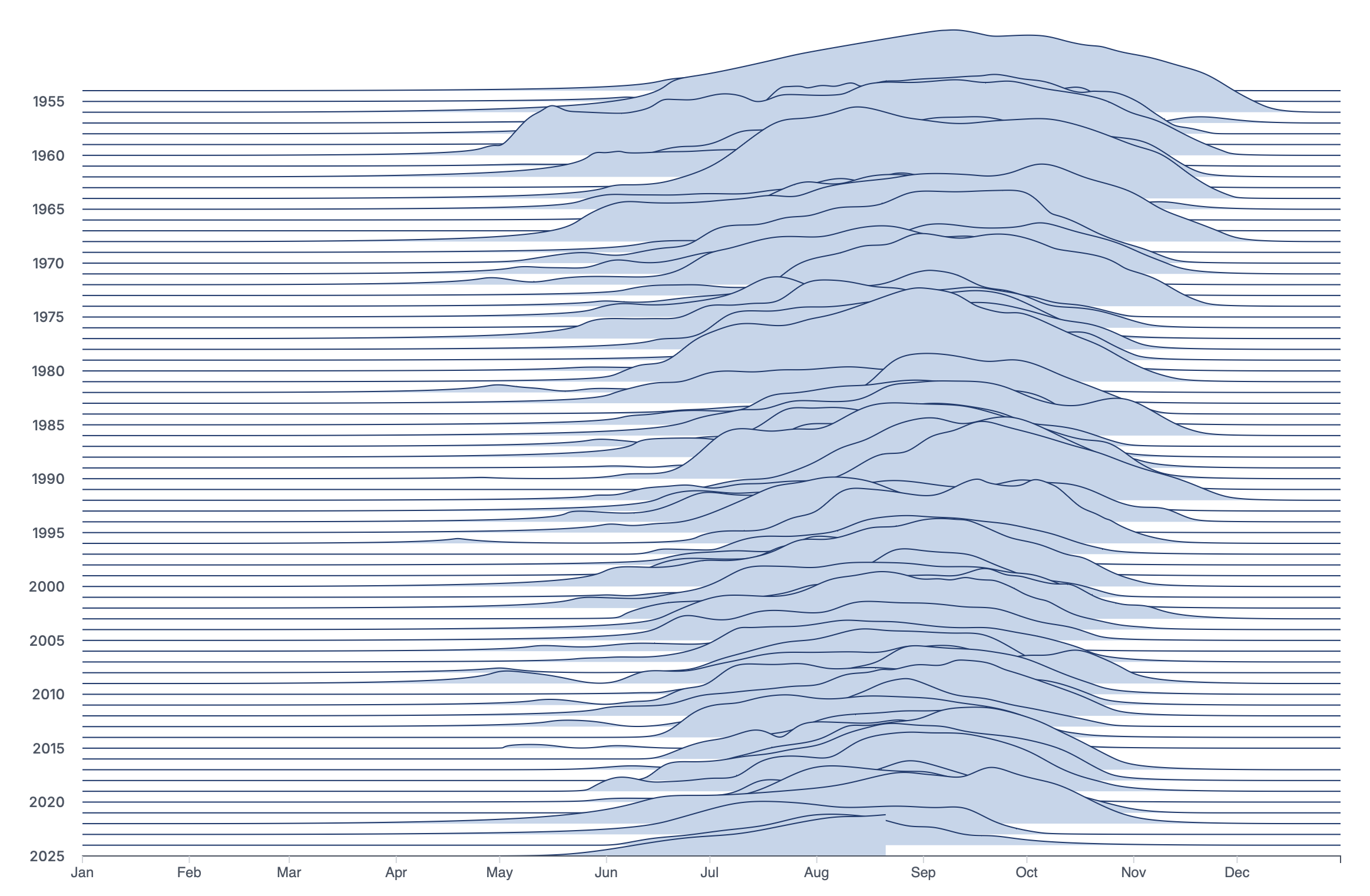
Visualisation of historical snow depth from 1954 to 2025 as measured at Snowy Hydro's Spencers Creek snow depth measurement site at 1830 metres above sea level

According to the Australian Government's Bureau of Meteorology, in most years snow is sufficient above about 1500 metres to sustain a "viable ski industry". However, snow falls vary greatly from year to year.

Despite the large year to year variations of Australian snow seasons, observations show a major long term decline in the average snowpack depth, with an average downward tendency of about 0.4–0.6 cm (depending on altitude) per year since 1954. This is a result of increasing temperatures and decreasing cold extremes in the winter, leading to an increase in alpine rain events. The ski resorts are already being affected by the increasingly unreliable snowfalls and the shortening life of the thinning winter snowpack. This trend has been partly offset by multimillion dollar investments in snow making and snow grooming at the major resorts. However, the smaller resorts are mostly at lower altitudes, and therefore are more exposed to the effects of global warming, and are experiencing increasing disruptions of their snow season, threatening their continued viability in the coming years. Former popular resorts, Kiandra (1400 metres above sea level) the birthplace of skiing in Australia, and Mount Donna Buang (1250 metres) the most popular ski resort in the 1920s and 1930s, are now considered too marginal for recreational skiing. Mt Donna Buang, now rarely has skiable snow and is reserved for sightseeing only. Climate change is predicted to continue reducing natural snowfall and opportunities for snow making at Australian alpine resorts, representing a threat to the viability of Australia's ski industry. Australia's ski resorts are located near the top of the highest mountain ranges in Australia and so there is little scope to relocate to higher areas if the existing ski fields become too warm.

The official opening of the ski season for most resorts coincides with the Kings Birthday Long Weekend on the second Monday in June, although extensive downhill skiing often does not become available until late in the month or July due to the climate change induced shortening of the snow sports season. The season usually ends in early October, although in the twentieth century it was not unusual for some of the higher resorts, particularly Perisher and Thredbo, to extend into early November. However, more recent years have seen poor conditions as early as late September.

== History and major locations ==
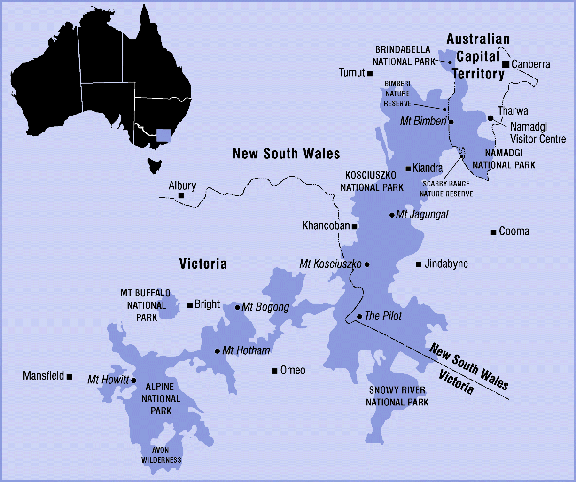
The adjoining alpine national parks of the Australian Alps

There is skiable terrain in three States: New South Wales, Victoria and Tasmania, as well as in the Australian Capital Territory, during the Southern Hemisphere winter. The ski season runs from June/July to September/October. A number of well serviced resorts have been developed, including: Thredbo, Perisher Ski Resort, Charlotte Pass and Selwyn Snowfields in New South Wales; Mount Buller, Falls Creek, Mount Hotham, Mount Baw Baw and Mount Buffalo in Victoria; as well as the small resorts of Ben Lomond and Mount Mawson in Tasmania.

New South Wales has the highest terrain and ski resorts: Perisher's newly constructed Mount Perisher 6 Chair terminates at 2042 metres, Thredbo's highest lifted point is a close second at 2037 metres, and Charlotte Pass at 1990 metres. In Victoria, the highest lifted points are at Mount Hotham with 1845 metres, Falls Creek at 1842 metres, and Mount Buller at 1805 metres.

Jindabyne is the main service town for the New South Wales resorts, but most Australian resort centres have on-snow accommodation. Other ski-service towns include Cooma and Adaminaby in NSW and Bright in Victoria. Canberra is situated around two hours' drive from the New South Wales ski-fields, while Melbourne is in good proximity to some of the Victorian resorts (less than two and a half hours’ drive to Mount Baw Baw and three to Mount Buller). The resort village of Dinner Plain in Victoria also has ski facilities.

The mainland's highest peak is Mount Kosciuszko at 2228 m.

=== New South Wales ===
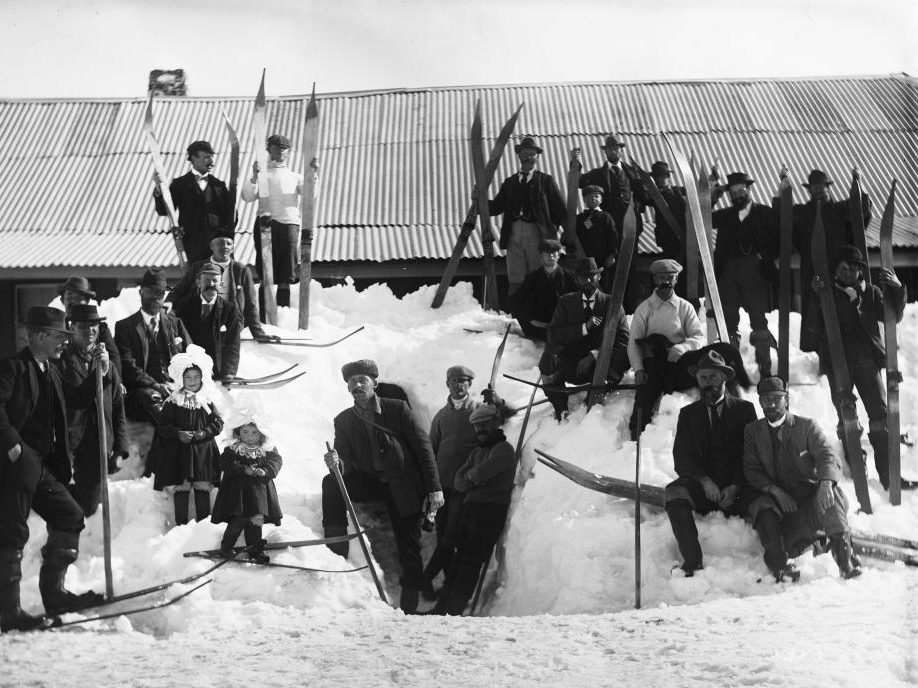
A photograph by Charles Kerry of skiers from the 1900 Kiandra Snow Shoe Carnival. Kiandra, NSW, is where skiing began in Australia in 1861.

New South Wales is home to Australia's highest snow country, oldest skifields and largest resort. Recreational skiing in Australia began in 1861 at Kiandra, New South Wales, when Norwegian gold miners introduced the idea to the frozen hills around the town. The first and longest surviving ski club in the world, The Kiandra Snow Shoe Club, was formed at Kiandra in that year.

==== Kiandra, the Northern Skifields, and the birth of skiing in Australia ====
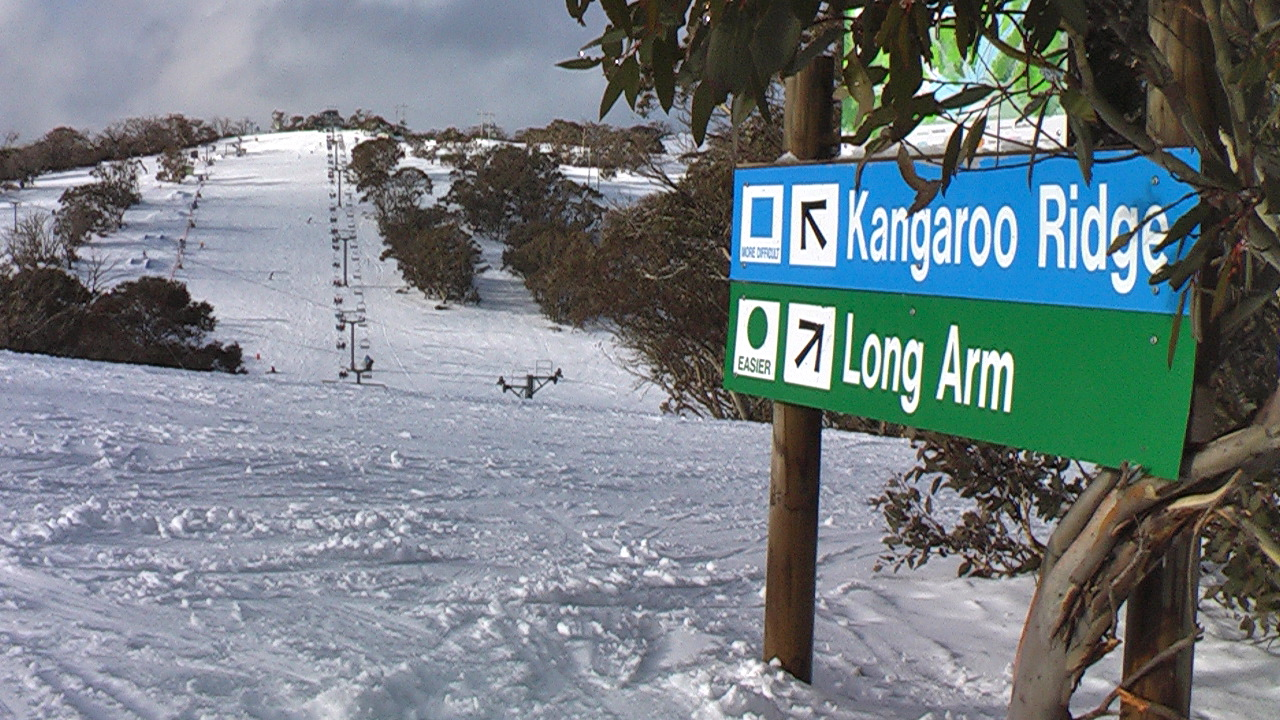
Selwyn Snowfields, July 2011.

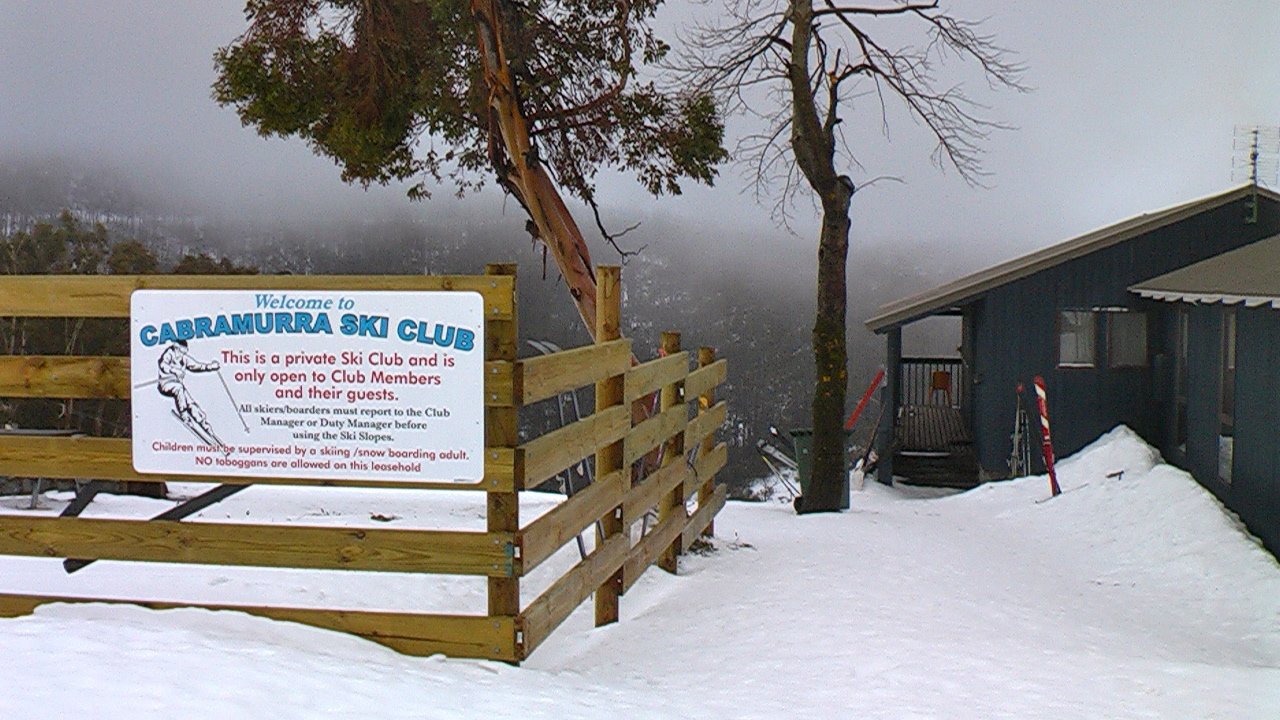
Cabramurra Ski Club. Cabramurra is Australia's highest town and has a private ski club slope for the use of members.

In the 19th century, Kiandra, a gold mining town at 1400 metres above sea level in the Snowy Mountains, was usually isolated by deep snow for months, making access by horse or foot difficult or at times impossible. In 1861, Norwegian miners introduced recreational skiing to the snowbound mining settlement after manufacturing over forty pairs of both short skis known as skates and the longer snow shoes during the months before the first winter snow. To avoid confusion with a conventional skate the skates were described as (two palings turned up at the front end and about four-foot long). There were no fence palings or posts in Kiandra in 1861.

Other early ski clubs reported in 1861 include the "Trysil Skytte- og Skiløberforening" (Shot and Ski Practitioner Association) in Norway, and the Onion Valley Snow Shoe Club in the United States. The Norway association held their first competition in January 1862. Alpine ski clubs were first founded in Munich, Germany 1891, Switzerland 1893, Arlberg, Austria 1901, followed by France and Italy. Sir Arnold Lunn founded the Kandahar Ski Club of Great Britain in 1924.

The "Kiandra Snow Shoe Club" held separate ski races for both ladies and children as early as 1885. Barbara Yan was the first identifiable woman documented as to having won a Downhill Skiing Championship. Yan also won the ladies downhill in 1887, the year her siblings won the girls' under-8 section and second in the under-12s. In 1908 the club held the first ever documented International and Intercontinental Downhill Skiing Carnival. Results - America 1st, Australia 2nd, England 3rd.

Australia's longest running skiing competition is the Balmain Cup. By 1933 team racing was open to virtually all competitors from any club or imported talents but Arthur Balmain of Cooma believed this was unfair to local enthusiasts. He donated a perpetual trophy open only to competitors residing in or about the Southern Districts and only for members who held membership for twelve weeks in the local ski club. Arthur Balmain, whose company transported skiers to all localities, envisaged a competition that would encompass all clubs. He decreed that a team must compete for the Balmain Cup with all members competing in four disciplines: Downhill, Slalom, Jump and Langlauf. In 1946 the competition format for competitors eligibility was changed and the jump section was removed.

In the wilderness region south of Kiandra, The Alpine Hut, near Mount Jagungal, was built in 1939 to cater for skiers. Access was arduous - via packhorse and ski.

The Kiandra Goldrush was short-lived, but the township remained a service centre for recreational and survival skiing for over a century. The Kiandra courthouse closed as a police station in 1937, and was for a time used as a private residence, before becoming the Kiandra Chalet (until 1953) and later the Kiandra Chalet Hotel, The owner of the Chalet ran a ski rope tow. The Chalet closed in 1973 and the building became a Roads Depot building. Australia's first T-bar lift was installed on Township Hill in 1957, but in 1978, Kiandra's ski lift operations re-located permanently to nearby Mount Selwyn (Selwyn Snowfields). Selwyn is the most northerly of Australia's ski resorts with a base elevation of 1492 m and a top elevation of 1614 m. Selwyn is well suited to families and first timers, with 88% of terrain catering to beginners and intermediates, however the steeper gradient of the Racecourse Run provides some more challenging terrain for advanced skiers and boarders. The longest run at Selwyn is the 800 m "Long Arm Run".

Longer slopes and more reliable snows lie further to the south and in the 20th century, the focus of recreational skiing in New South Wales shifted southward, to the Mount Kosciuszko region.

==== Kosciuszko Region ====
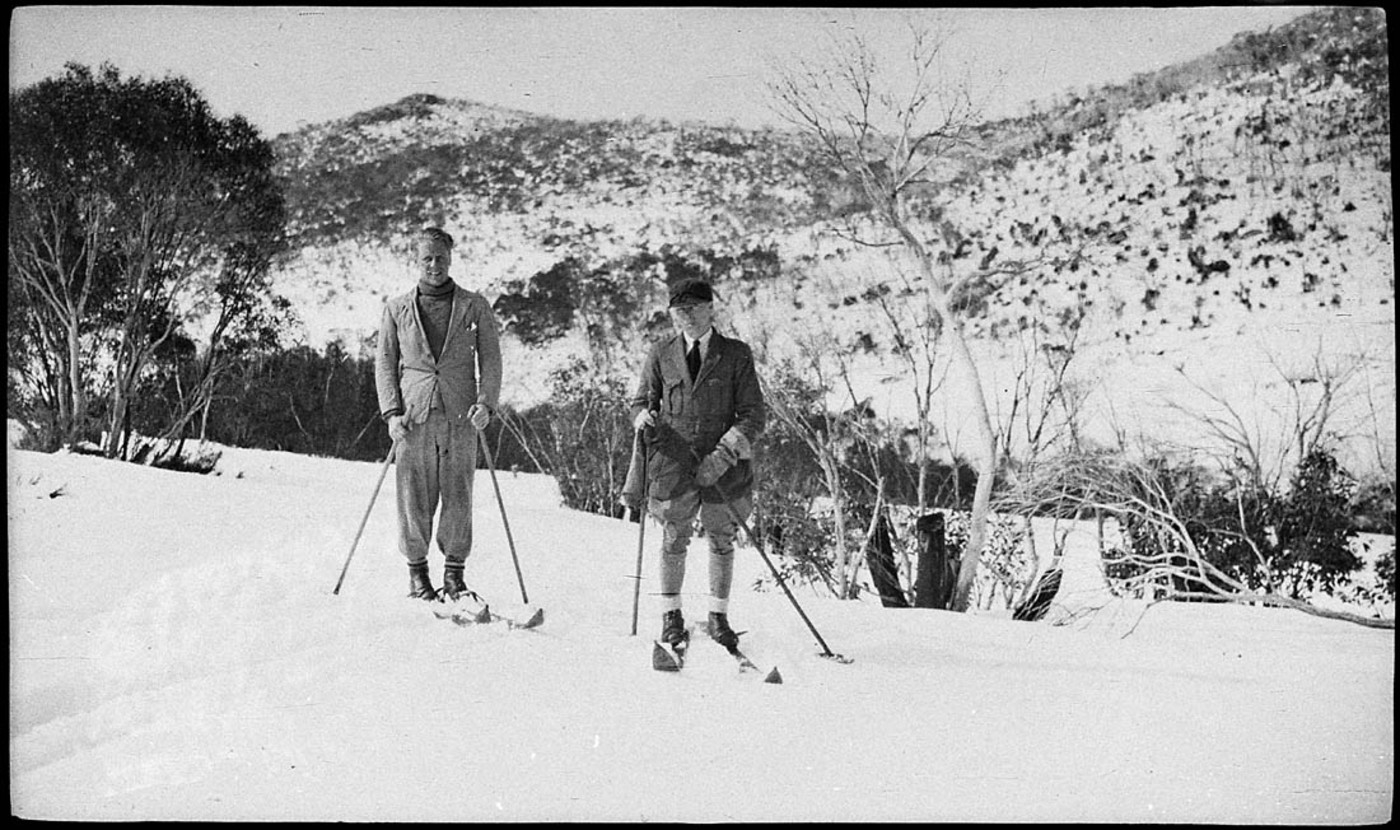
Skiing, Mt. Kosciusko, Australia, c. 1925, by Albert James Perier

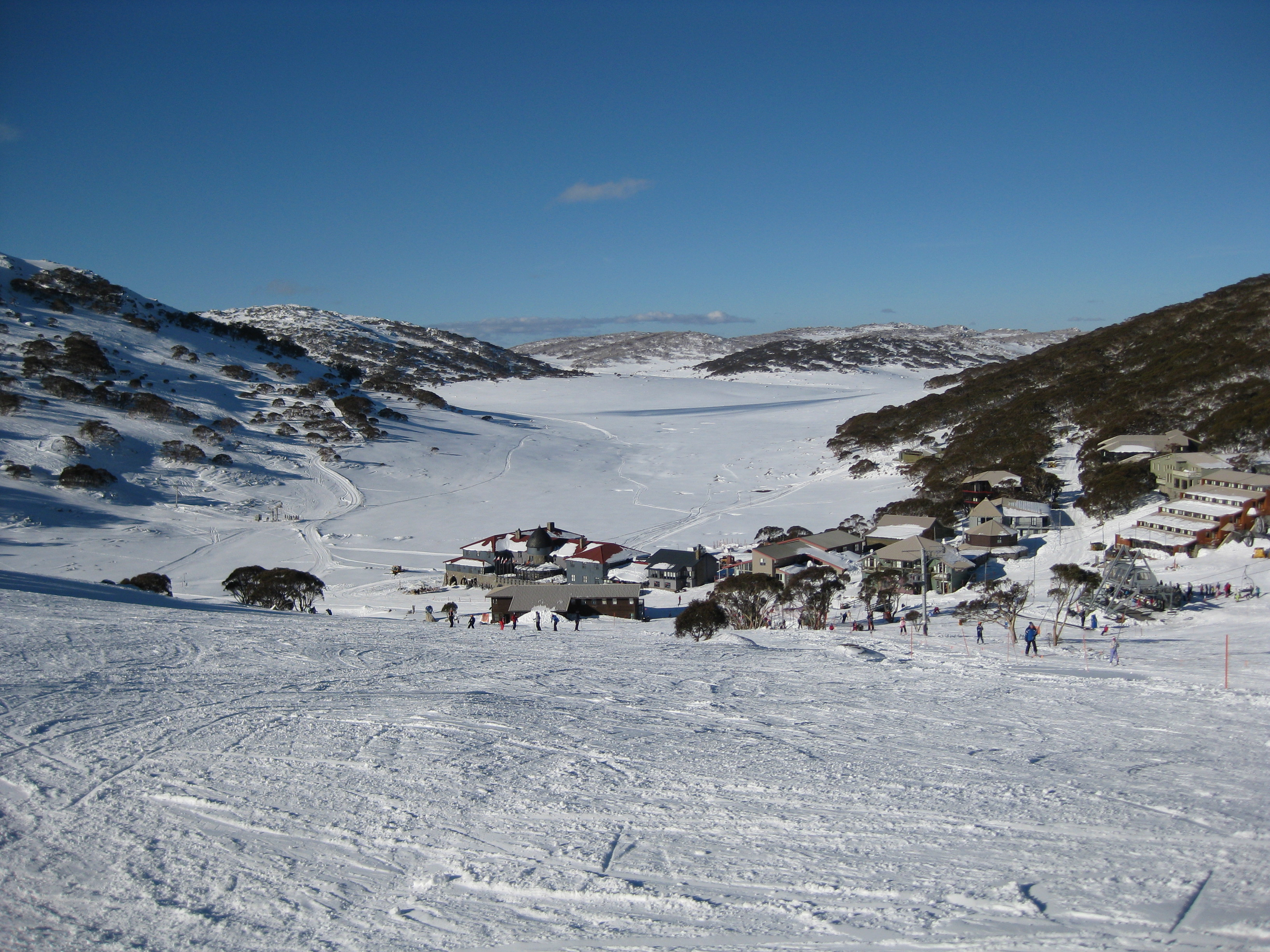
Charlotte Pass, NSW, was a pioneer of the Australian ski industry. Village elevation is at 1760 m.

In 1900, a hut was built at Bett's Camp, above the Thredbo Escarpment, and came into use for winter skiers. The Hotel Kosciusko was opened by the New South Wales Government in 1909 at what is now Sponars Chalet, near Smiggin Holes.

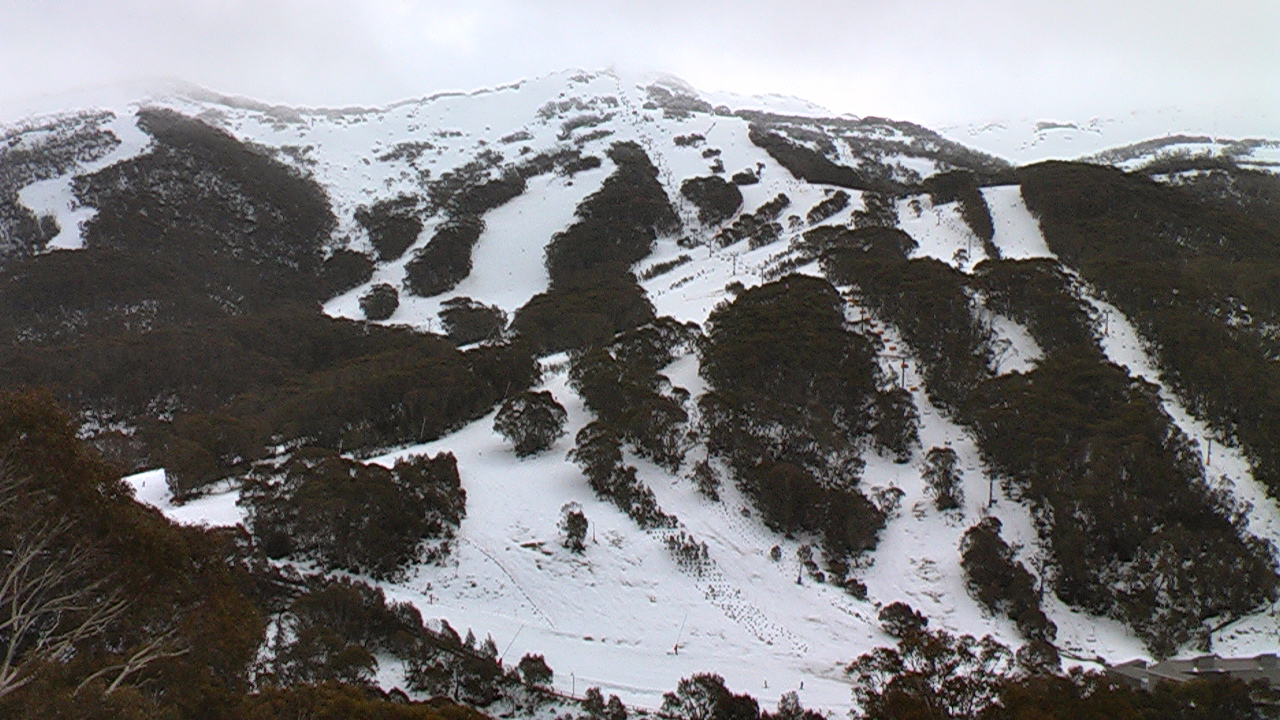
Thredbo's (NSW) vertical drop of 672 m is the greatest of Australian ski resorts.

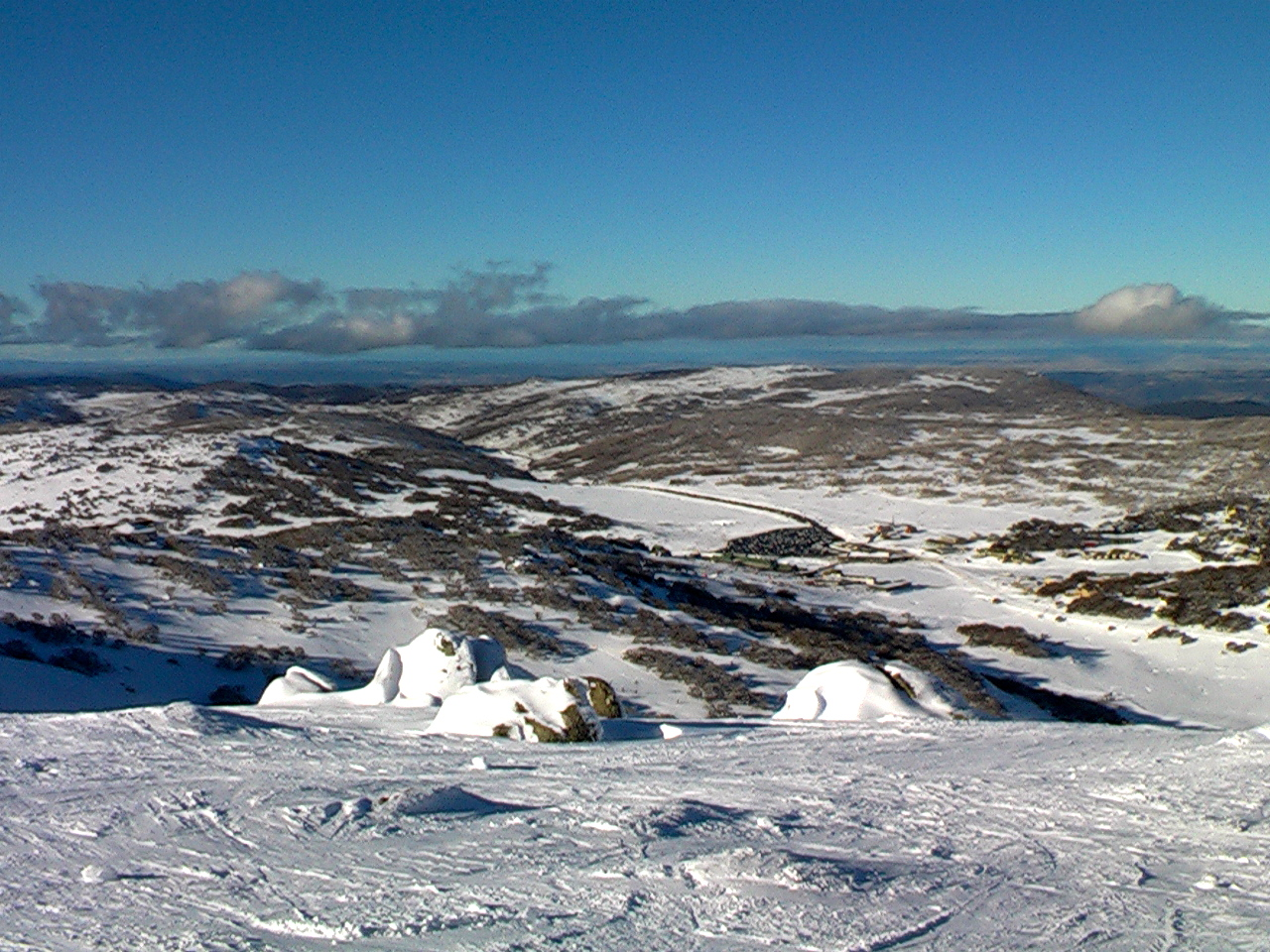
Perisher Valley, NSW, from near the summit of Mount Perisher.

The first Kosciuszko Chalet was built at Charlotte Pass in 1930, giving relatively comfortable access to Australia's highest terrain. In 1964, Australia briefly boasted the "World's Longest Chairlift", designed to carry skiers from the Thredbo Valley to Charlotte Pass, but technical difficulties soon closed the facility. At 1760 m, Charlotte Pass has the highest village base elevation of any Australia ski resort and can only be accessed via over-snow transport in winter. The growing number of ski enthusiasts heading to Charlotte Pass led to the establishment of a cafe at Smiggin Holes around 1939, where horse-drawn sleighs would deliver skiers to begin the arduous oversnow journey on skis to the Kosciuszko Chalet. It was the construction of the vast Snowy Mountains Hydro-Electric Scheme from 1949 to 1974 that opened up the Snowy Mountains for large scale development of a ski industry and led to the establishment of Thredbo and Perisher as leading Australian resorts. The Construction of Guthega Dam brought skiers to the isolated Guthega district and a rope tow was installed there in 1957.

Ski fields up by Kosciuszko's side were also established during this period, though their existence is now little realised. The Australian Alpine Club was founded in 1950 by Charles Anton with a view to establishing a chain of lodges for ski touring across the Australian Alps. Huts were constructed in the "Back Country" close to Mount Kosciuszko, including Kunama Hut, which opened for the 1953 season. A rope tow was installed on Mount Northcote at the site and opened in 1954. The site proved excellent for speed skiing, but the hut was destroyed in an avalanche, which also killed one person, in 1956.

Anton also recognised the potential of the Thredbo Valley for construction of a major resort and village, with good vertical terrain. Construction began in 1957. Today, Thredbo has 14 ski-lifts and possesses Australia's longest ski resort run, the 5.9 km from Karel's T-Bar to Friday Flat; Australia's greatest vertical drop of 672 m; and the highest lifted point in Australia at 2037 m

The last establishment of a major skifield in NSW came with the development of Blue Cow Mountain in the 1980s. In 1987 the Swiss-designed Skitube Alpine Railway opened to deliver skiers from Bullocks Flat, on the Alpine Way, to Perisher Valley and to Blue Cow, which also opened in 1987. The operators of Blue Cow purchased Guthega in 1991, and the new combined resort later merged with Perisher-Smiggins to become the largest ski resort in the Southern Hemisphere. In 2011 Perisher had 47 lifts covering 1,245 hectares and four village base areas: Perisher Valley (elevation 1720m), Blue Cow Terminal (1890 m), Smiggin Holes (1680 m) and Guthega (1640 m). The resort is spread across seven mountain peaks, with the highest lifted point being Mount Perisher Double Chair at 2,034 m and the greatest vertical drop on a single run being 355 m from the Ridge Chair at Blue Cow.

=== Victoria ===
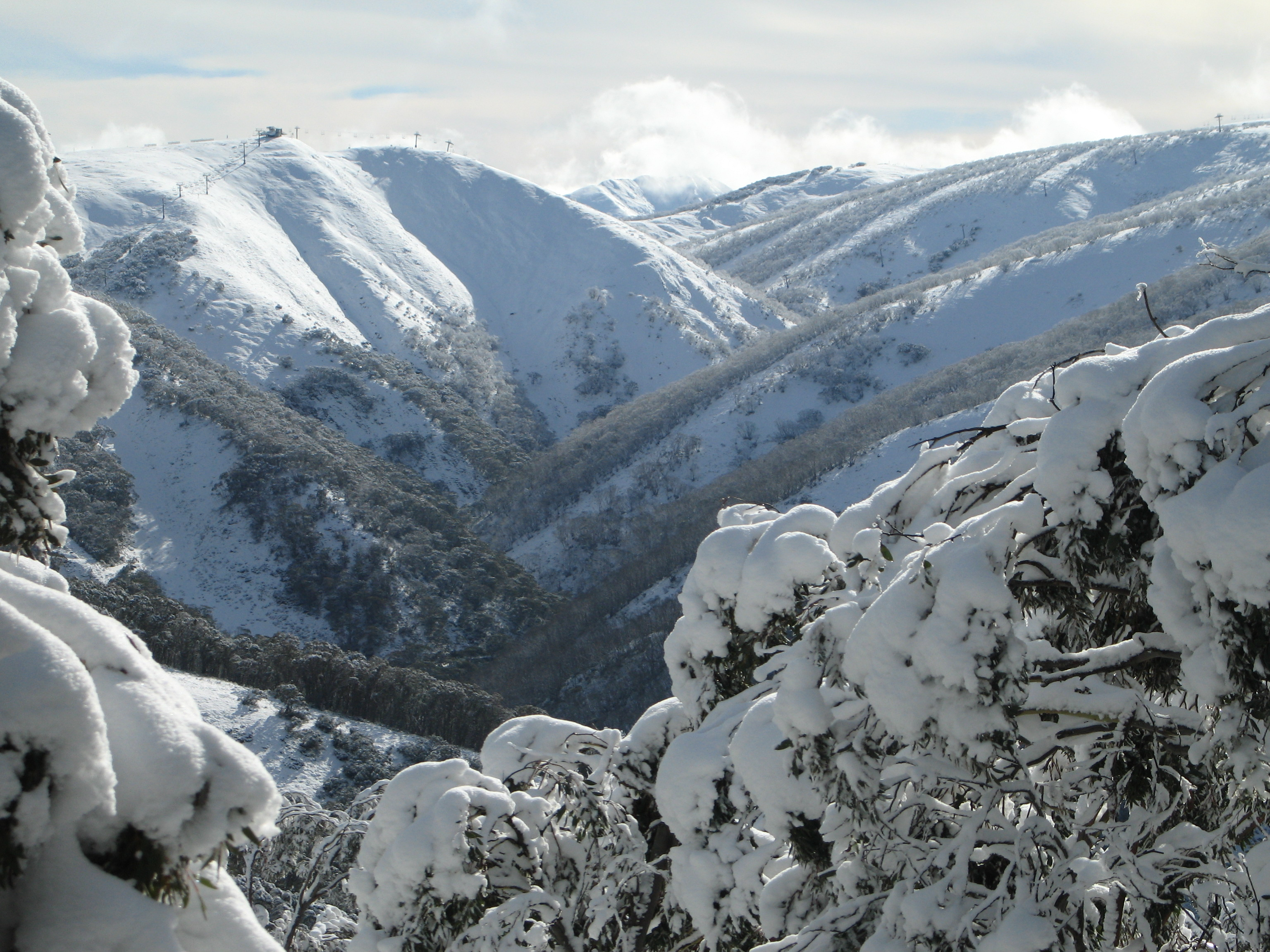
Mount Hotham Victoria

Victoria is the state with the greatest number of ski resorts in Australia. The highest peak in Victoria is Mount Bogong at 1986m.

A hospice was built at Mount Saint Bernard (elevation 1540m) around 1863 along a track developed to link the Victorian gold fields. Snowshoes were developed locally to assist winter travellers, with a larger hospice being built around 1884. Recreational and practical skiing was practised in the area by the 1880s and 1890s with skis made from local timbers, and making use of single steering poles. The first winter traverse of the Victorian Alps was made in 1900, via the Hospice and Mount Hotham. The Hospice operated as a recreational ski location into the 1930s, but was destroyed by bushfires in 1939. Skiing began at Mount Buffalo in the 1890s, and the Mount Buffalo Chalet was constructed in 1910. Australia's first ski tow was constructed near Mount Buffalo in 1936. Buffalo's first ski lodge was built at Dingo Dell in 1954. A bushfire in 2006 forced the temporary closure of the resort, and negotiations are continuing over a new lease on the property.

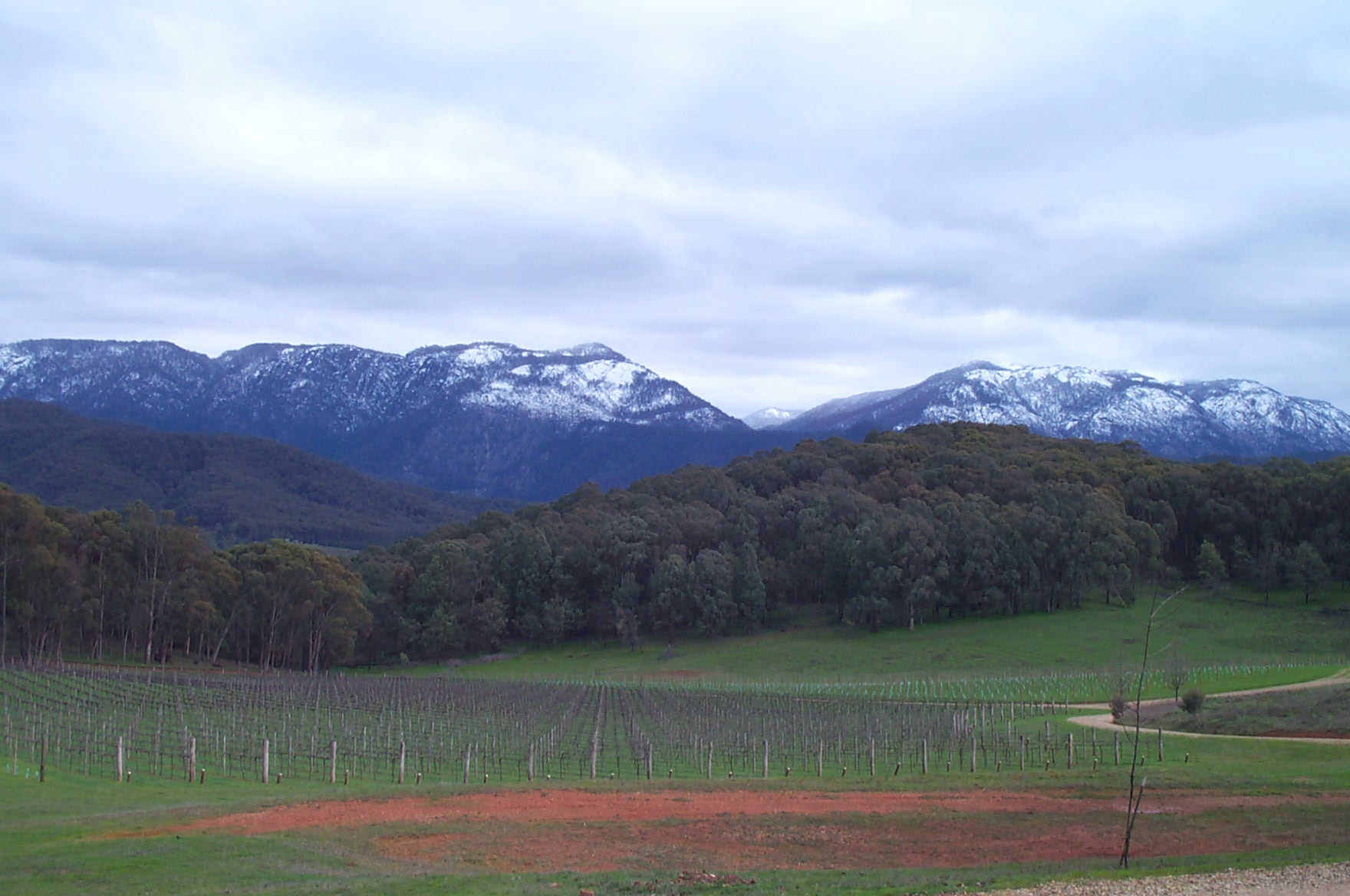
Australia's first rope tow was installed on the Mt Buffalo plateau, Victoria, in 1936.

In the late 1920s and 1930s, Mount Donna Buang was popular because of its proximity to Melbourne, despite its erratic snowfall patterns and short runs. It eventually lost out in the 1950s to higher resorts further from Melbourne with the improvements in roads and automobiles.

A stone cottage was built at Mount Hotham in 1925 to cater for a growing interest in skiing, and a Club was built in 1944, with the first ski tow installed in 1951. A ski hut was erected at Mount Baw Baw, 120 km east of Melbourne, in 1945, and a ski rope tow added in 1955. The first ski lift went into service at Mount Buller in 1949, and in the same year a rope tow was installed at Falls Creek. In 1957, Australia's first chairlift was installed at Falls Creek, and the area is now the largest ski resort in Victoria.

The Interschools Event, hosted in Mount Buller, claims to be the largest interdisciplinary snow-sports event, attracting 3500 participants in 2008.

Snow play is also available at Mount Donna Buang.

=== Australian Capital Territory ===
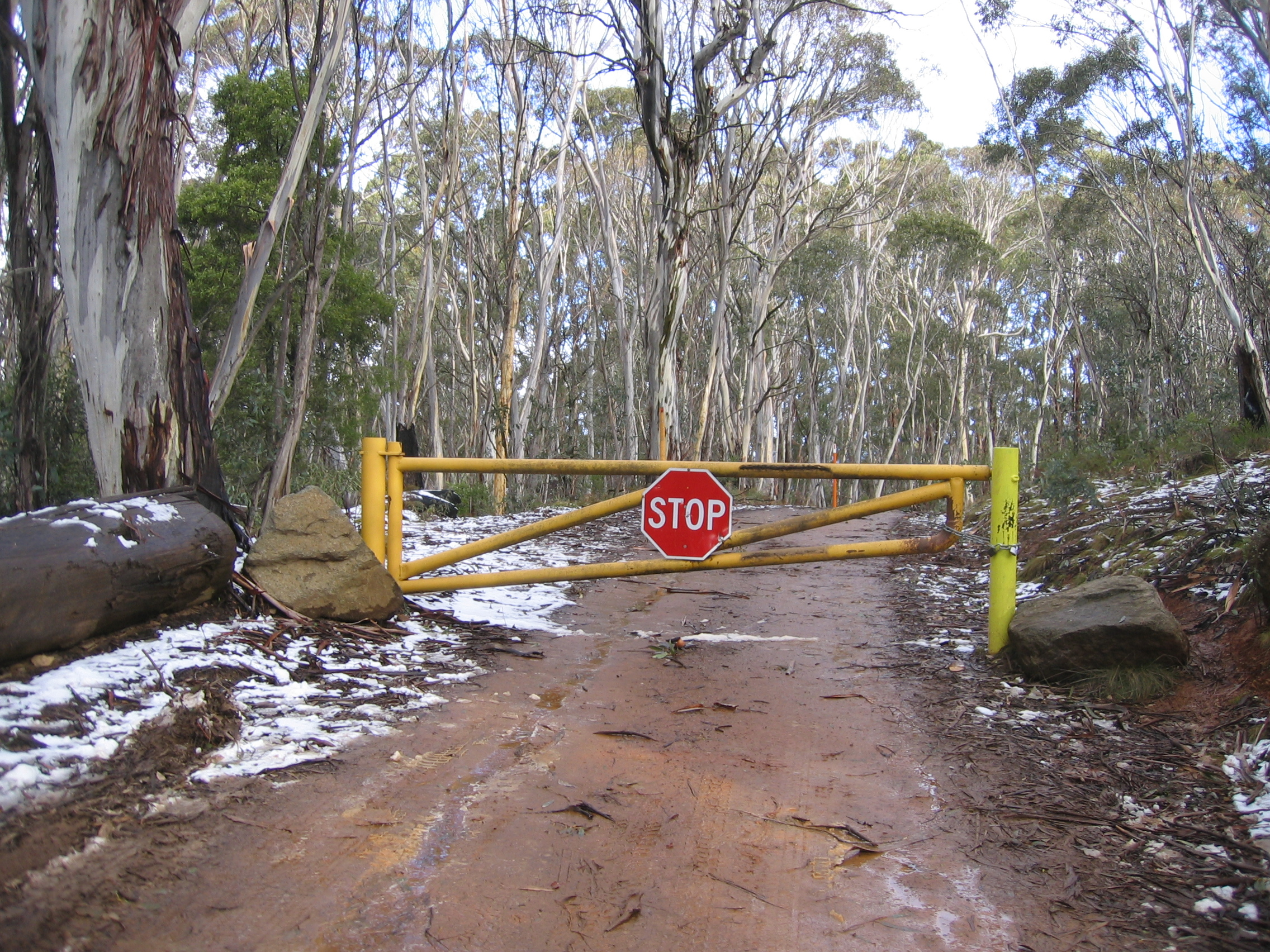
The road to Mount Franklin, A.C.T., was built by the Canberra Alpine Club in the 1930s

The most northerly ski fields in Australia are located in the A.C.T. - in the Brindabella Ranges which rise to the west of Canberra, the capital city of Australia, and include the Namadgi National Park in the A.C.T. and Bimberi Nature Reserve and Brindabella National Park in New South Wales. The highest mountain in the ACT is Bimberi Peak, which lies above the treeline at 1912 metres, at the northern edge of the Snowy Mountains.

A ski chalet was constructed at Mount Franklin in 1938 to service the Canberra Alpine Club. Ski runs were cleared and ski tows were improvised. The chalet later operated as a museum before being destroyed in the 2003 bushfires. A new shelter designed and built by University of Adelaide students opened in 2008. Today, cross country skiing is possible in the area, when conditions allow. Cross Country skiing is also practised at Mount Gingera, which rises above the city of Canberra to an elevation of 1855m, and is the most prominent snow-covered peak above the city.

Snow play is available at Corin Forest, near Canberra, at an elevation of 1200 m. A development plan was drafted following the 2003 Canberra bushfires which would see three 600 m chairlifts installed together with snowmaking facilities and accommodation at this site.

As has proved to be the case throughout the neighbouring Kosciuszko National Park ski resorts, recent developments in artificial snowmaking capacity would allow for the enhancement of previously utilised ski slopes in the ACT, but the Namadgi National Park Draft Management Plan of September 2005 downplayed the future development of skiing as a sport in the Park, citing environmental concerns and suggesting that "climate change" has made conditions "less favourable":

Ski touring is a minor activity in Namadgi as snowfall is only adequate for skiing for short periods in winter and spring. In most years, snow play can occur over several weeks, even if snow is present in small patches on the higher peaks...

No facilities exist for alpine or downhill skiing within Namadgi, although there is a history of downhill skiing associated with the Canberra Alpine Ski Club and the Mt Franklin Chalet (destroyed in the 2003 bushfires). It is unlikely that Namadgi will be suitable for this activity in the future as climate change is causing conditions to become less favourable. More suitable locations exist and opportunities are available within Kosciuszko National Park.

=== Tasmania ===
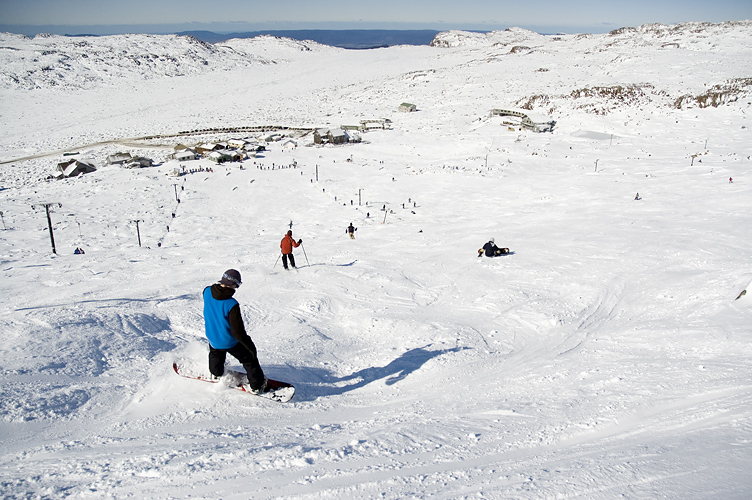
The Summit Run, Ben Lomond, Tasmania

The most southerly ski fields in Australia are located in Tasmania, a mountainous island off the southern coast of Eastern Australia. Much of the state is subject to at least occasional winter snows. Mount Ossa is the highest point on the island at 1,614 m (5,295 ft) but Tasmania has eight mountains exceeding 1500 m and 28 above 1,220 m. Also notable is the Central Plateau, at an elevation of around 900 m. The capital city of Hobart is built at the base of Mount Wellington, which at 1270 m is snow-capped in winter.

Tasmania's premier Alpine skiing operations are located at Ben Lomond, 60 km (37 mi) from Launceston. The village is at 1460 m and the top elevation is 1,570 m (5,150 ft). Its season usually begins in mid-July and in peak season, its runs are served by seven lifts. Limited downhill ski operations also exist in the Mount Field National Park at Mount Mawson, which is approximately 89 kilometres north west of Hobart and rises from 1200 m to 1320 m altitude.

One of Australia's most scenic alpine locations is located in Tasmania at Cradle Mountain, where cross country skiing is possible. Cradle Mountain is part of the Tasmanian Wilderness World Heritage Area, inscribed by UNESCO in 1982.

== Competitive skiing ==
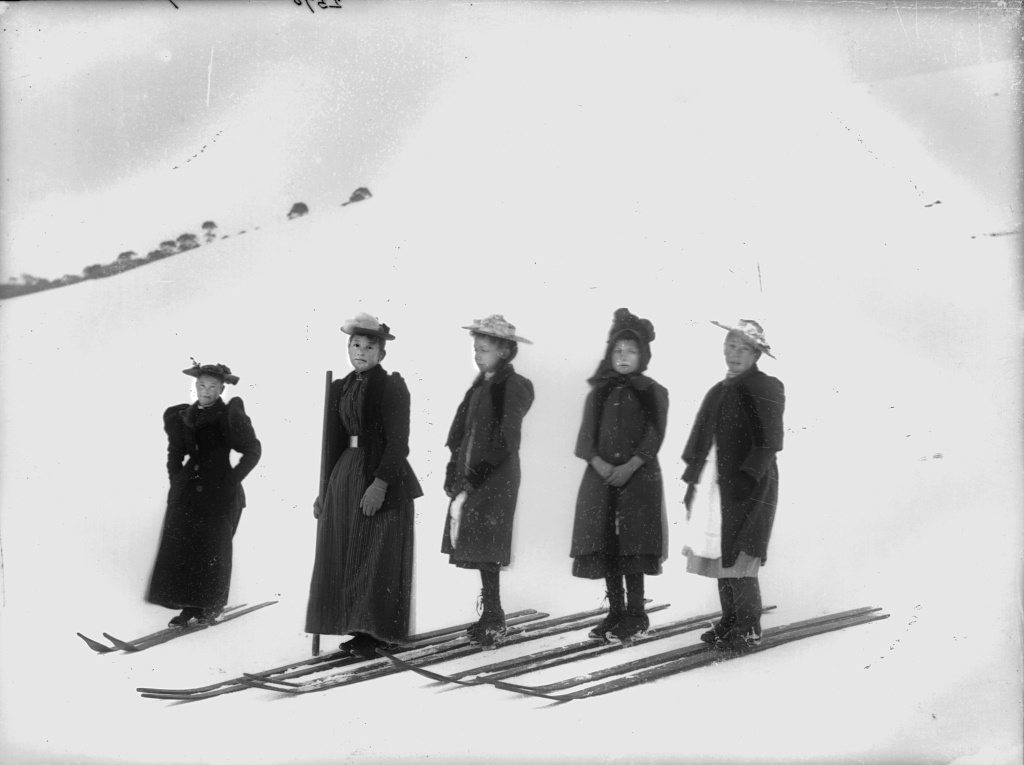
The Start of the Girls' Snowshoe Race, Kiandra c. 1900

Australia was a pioneer nation in the sport of ski racing, with annual ski races being conducted at Kiandra during the 19th Century. The Kiandra snow shoe club is the oldest ski club in the world. The club was formed in 1861 by three Norwegians, Elias Gottaas, Soren Torp and Carl Bjerknes on the Kiandra Gold Fields, NSW. This original Kiandra ski club is now recognised as the first alpine snow ski club in the world, it also carries the distinction of being the longest continuously operating club. In 2006, the Holmenkollen Ski Museum confirmed that the first two ski clubs in the world were formed by Norwegians in 1861, "both in Australia and Norway".

10 May 2011 The Federation of International Skiing included in a letter signed by the President Gian Franco Kasper the following statement: "I would like to commend you for having organised the first alpine ski races in the history of our sport."

29 June 2011 Federation International Skiing wrote: "2011 is an historic year for Australian skiing, and the 150-year milestone is being celebrated across the nation's ski fields by many organisations. The FIS joins the congratulations for this important Australian anniversary, together for Kiandra's inaugural position in alpine skiing in the world."

Ski races were conducted from 1861 then in 1908 the club held the world's first documented "International Ski Carnival". The results were: America, 1st. Australia, 2nd. England, 3rd. In addition to the International Downhill Race, events included races for boys under eight, ten, eleven and fourteen; boys and girls Open Championships were also conducted. The events concluded with a "New Chum" event and toboggan race.

The Federation Internationale de Ski calendar lists various alpine and cross country skiing, as well as snowboarding and moguls competitions in Australia during the month of August.

=== The Winter Olympics & World Cup Skiing ===
Australian skiers competed in the Winter Olympics for the first time in Oslo, 1952. Australian skiers have competed in all subsequent Winter Olympic Games and won medals at every Games since 1998.

Australians have competed in Olympic alpine skiing, biathlon, cross-country skiing, freestyle skiing, and Nordic combined (one competitor in 1960). Of these ski events, Australia has been most successful in the sport of Freestyle Skiing in which it has won Olympic medals, produced World Champions and over 100 world cup medals.

Malcolm Milne competed for Australia in Alpine skiing at the 1968 and 1972 Olympic Games. His 1968 Olympics 24th placing in the Slalom Event remains the best performance by an Australian male in that event. In 1969 he became the first non-European to win a men's World Cup downhill event - winning first place at Val d'Isère. Steven Lee became the second Australian to take a World Cup victory, winning at Furano, Japan in 1985, and Zali Steggall became the third Australian (and first woman) at Park City, Utah in 1997.

Alpine skier Zali Steggall won Australia's first skiing medal at the 1998 Nagano Olympics winning bronze in the women's slalom event. Australian freestyle skiers emerged as a world force from the mid-1990s, when Kirstie Marshall was placed 6th in the 1994 Lillehammer Olympics. The Olympic Winter Institute of Australia was established by the Australian Olympic Committee in June 1998 in an effort to improve the performances of its Australian Winter Olympic Teams, and Alisa Camplin won Australia's first Alpine Olympic gold medal in the Freestyle Skiing Women's Aerials at the Salt Lake City Olympics in 2002. Camplin won Bronze at the subsequent Torino Olympics in 2006, while Dale Begg-Smith won Australia's second skiing Gold in 2006 in the Freestyle Skiing Men's Moguls. Begg-Smith won silver in the same event at the 2010 Vancouver Olympics, while Lydia Lassila won gold for Australia in the Women's Aerials.

The sport of snowboarding is also popular in the Australian skifields and Australia has been represented at the Olympics in this sport ever since it debuted at Nagano in 1998. Torah Bright, of the Snowy Mountains town of Cooma, New South Wales, won gold for Australia at the Vancouver Olympics in 2010 in the women's snowboard halfpipe event. Bright's gold medal - combined with the gold and silver skiing event medals - made 2010 Australia's most successful winter Olympic Games. The Australian team was the only Southern Hemisphere team to secure medals and was ranked 13th in the overall medal tally. Australia's two gold medals equalled the gold medal haul of former Winter Olympic host nation France and surpassed those of former host nations Italy, Japan and Croatia (in the Former Yugoslavia). A parodical bid for Australia to host the Olympic Games at Smiggin Holes was launched by satirical sports commentators Roy and HG during the 2002 Salt Lake City Olympics: see Smiggin Holes 2010 Winter Olympic bid.

== Cross country & back country skiing ==
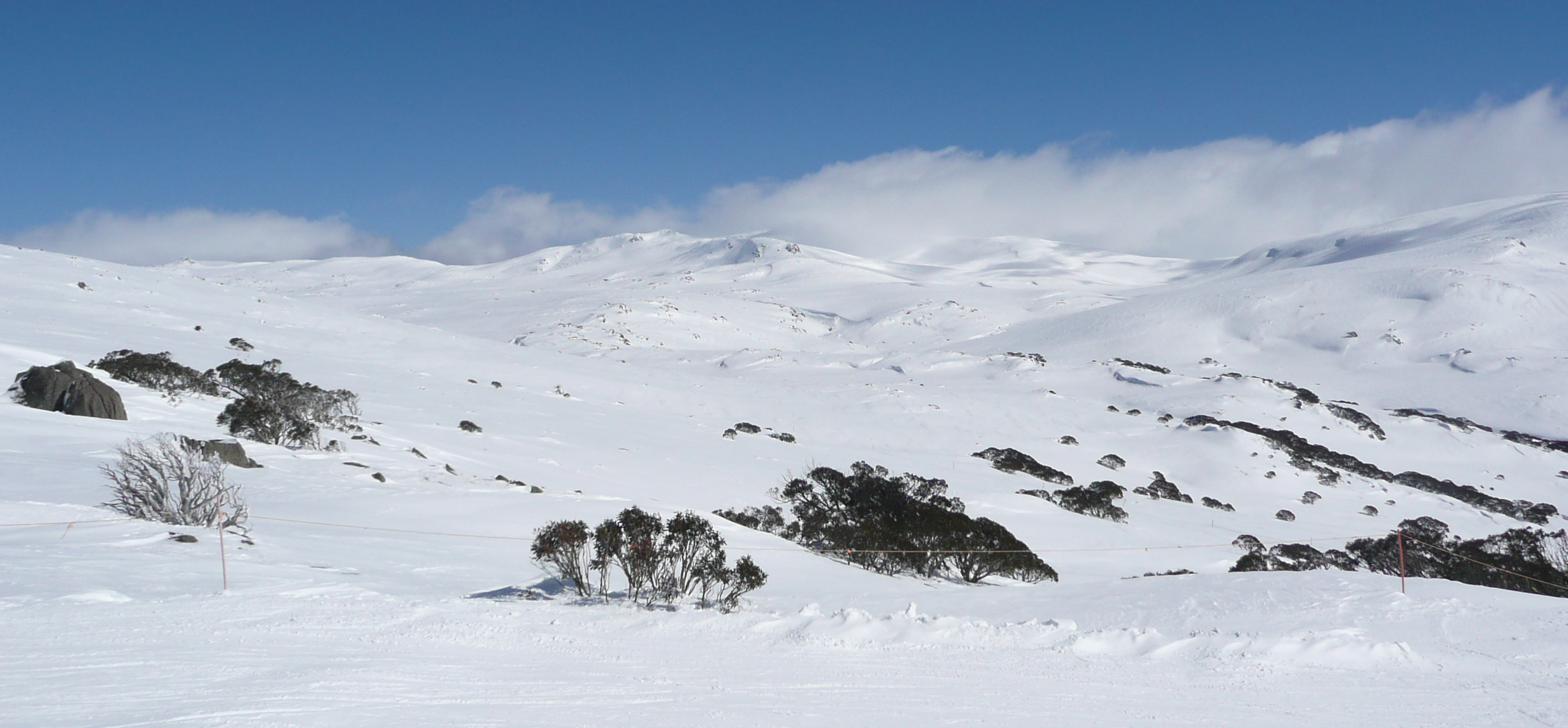
The Kosciuszko Main Range.

The Kosciuszko Main Range in the Snowy Mountains of New South Wales offer some of the most challenging cross-country and back-country skiing in Australia, notably Watsons Crags and Mount Twynam on the steep Western Face of the Range. The Mount Jagungal wilderness area provides some of the most isolated back-country ski terrain. High country huts, often a legacy of the era of cattle grazing in the mountains, provide emergency shelter in these regions. Seaman's Hut, near Kosciuszko, was built as a refuge in 1929 to commemorate Laurie Seaman, who was separated from his party and died in a 1928 blizzard while attempting to cross-country ski to Mount Kosciuszko.

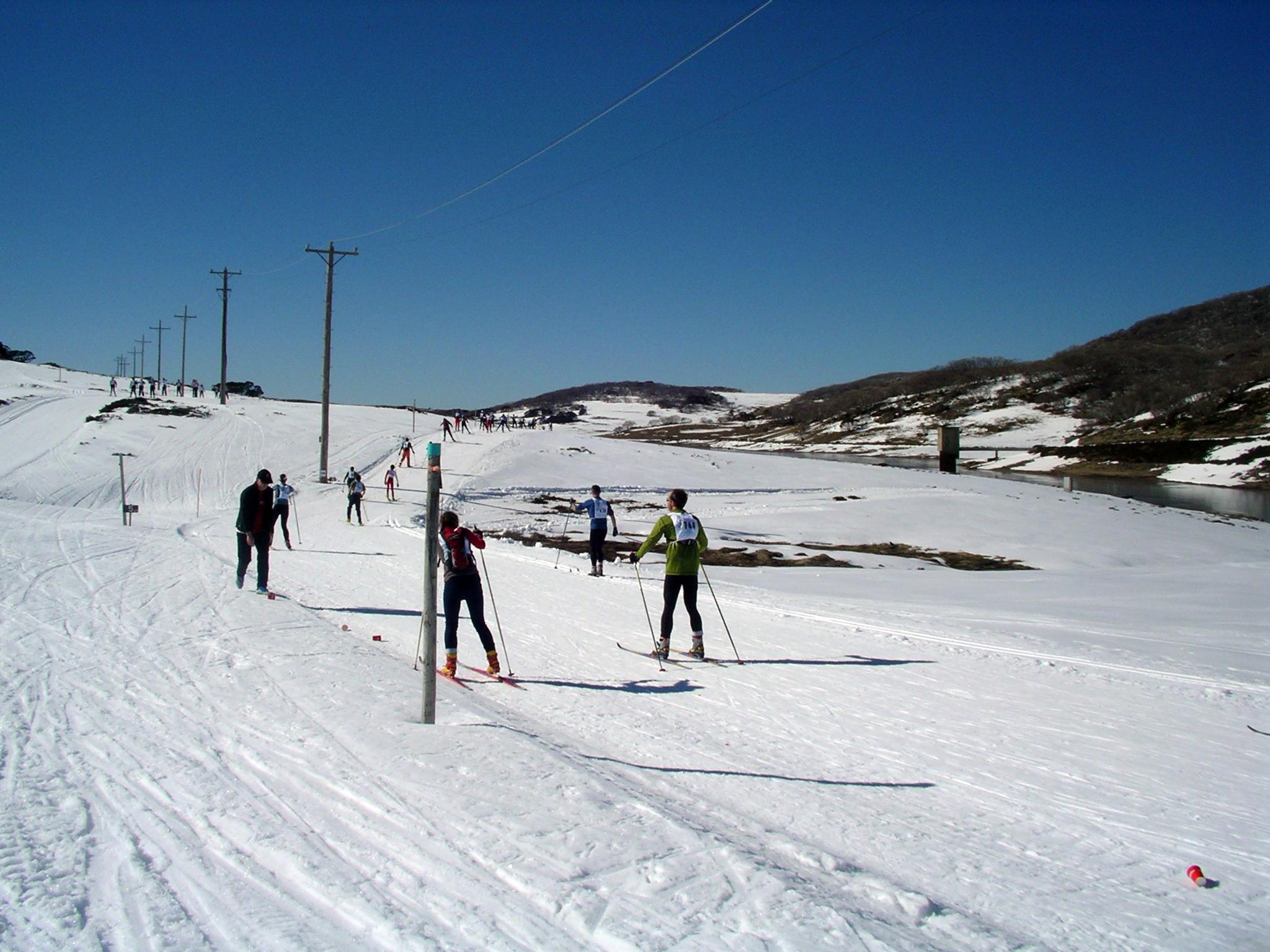
The Kangaroo Hoppet, an annual 42 km Cross Country Ski Race, at Falls Creek, Victoria.

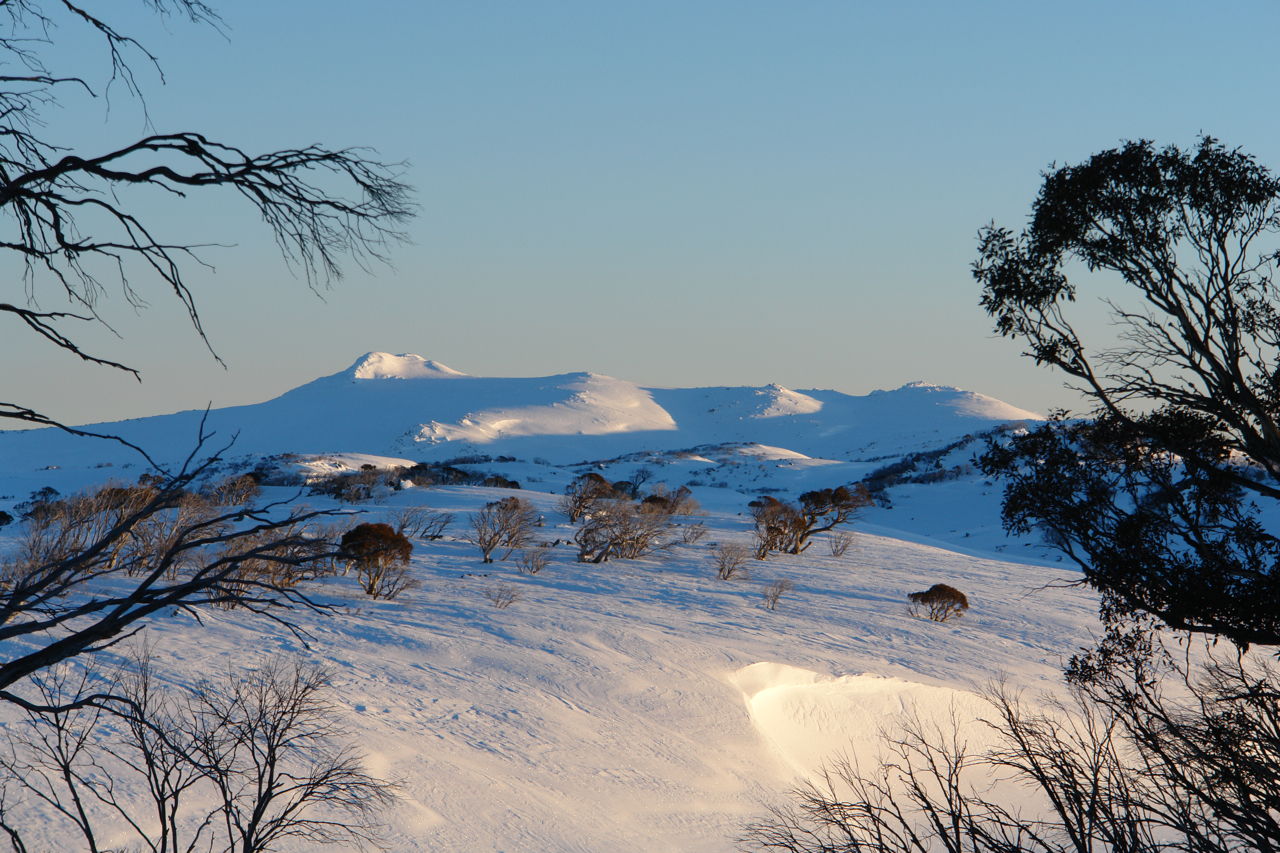
Sunrise on Mount Jagungal.

Dedicated Cross Country ski resorts are located at Lake Mountain, Mount Stirling and Mount St Gwinear in Victoria and popular areas for back country skiing and ski touring in the Alpine National Park, Yarra Ranges National Park and the Baw Baw National Park include: Mount Bogong, Mount Feathertop, Bogong High Plains, Mount Howitt, Mount Reynard and Snowy Plains. The Kangaroo Hoppet is a leg of the Worldloppet cross-country race series which is conducted on the last Saturday of August each year, hosted by Falls Creek in Victoria. The showpiece 42-kilometre race attracts thousands of spectators and competitors.

Cross country skiing can be possible in the Brindabella Ranges which rise to the west of Canberra, in the A.C.T, and include the Namadgi National Park and Bimberi Nature Reserve. Mount Franklin Chalet, built in 1938, in the A.C.T. played a pioneering role in providing lifted ski runs in Australia, however the chalet was converted to a museum and subsequently destroyed by fire in 2003, so today only cross country skiing can be practised in the area (when conditions allow). Cross Country skiing is also practised at Mount Gingera, elevation 1855 m, a prominent snow-covered peak above the city of Canberra.

When conditions allow, Australia's rugged island State of Tasmania also offers cross country skiers some scenic terrain - notably in the UNESCO World Heritage area around Cradle Mountain. Tasmania has 28 mountains above 1,220 m and much of the island is subject to at least occasional winter snow.

The Australian High Country is populated by unique flora and fauna including wombats, wallabies, echidnas, and the snow gum. The Alpine regions are subject to environmental protection, which has limited the scope of commercial development of skiable terrain, however Australia has extensive cross-country skiing terrain.

A landmark expedition in early Australian cross country skiing was conducted in 1927, when William Hughes, of the Kiandra Snow Shoe Club, together with four members of the Ski Club of Australia made the first historic ski traverse from Kiandra to the Hotel Kosciusko (now Sponars Chalet). Their eventful journey, via the Mount Jagungal Wilderness and across freezing rivers, is retold in Klaus Hueneke's book "Kiandra to Kosciusko" and was commemorated by 150 ski tourers in 1977 in an event organised by the Kosciuszko Huts Association.

== List of downhill ski resorts ==
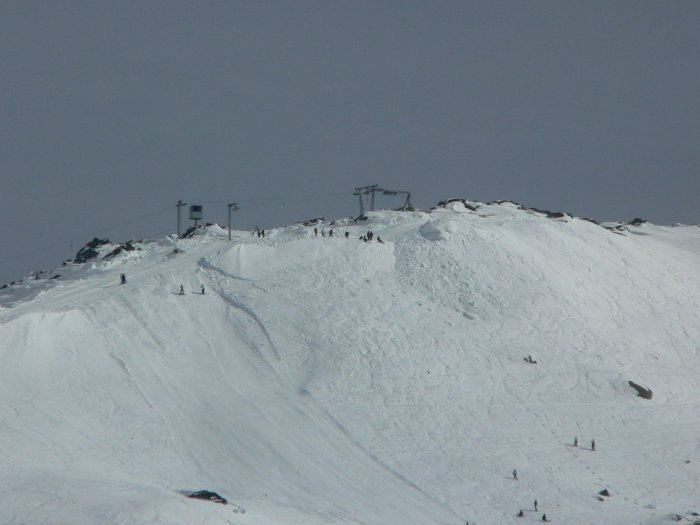
Olympic Ski Trail, leading to Perisher Valley from Mount Perisher. Perisher is Australia's largest ski resort.

Alpine Skiing:

- New South Wales
  - Thredbo
  - Perisher
    - Perisher Valley
    - Blue Cow Mountain
    - Smiggin Holes
    - Guthega
  - Selwyn Snowfields
  - Charlotte Pass
- Victoria
  - Mount Hotham
    - Dinner Plain
  - Falls Creek
  - Mount Buller
  - Mount Baw Baw
- Tasmania
  - Ben Lomond
  - Mount Mawson

== List of cross country ski resorts and backcountry locations ==
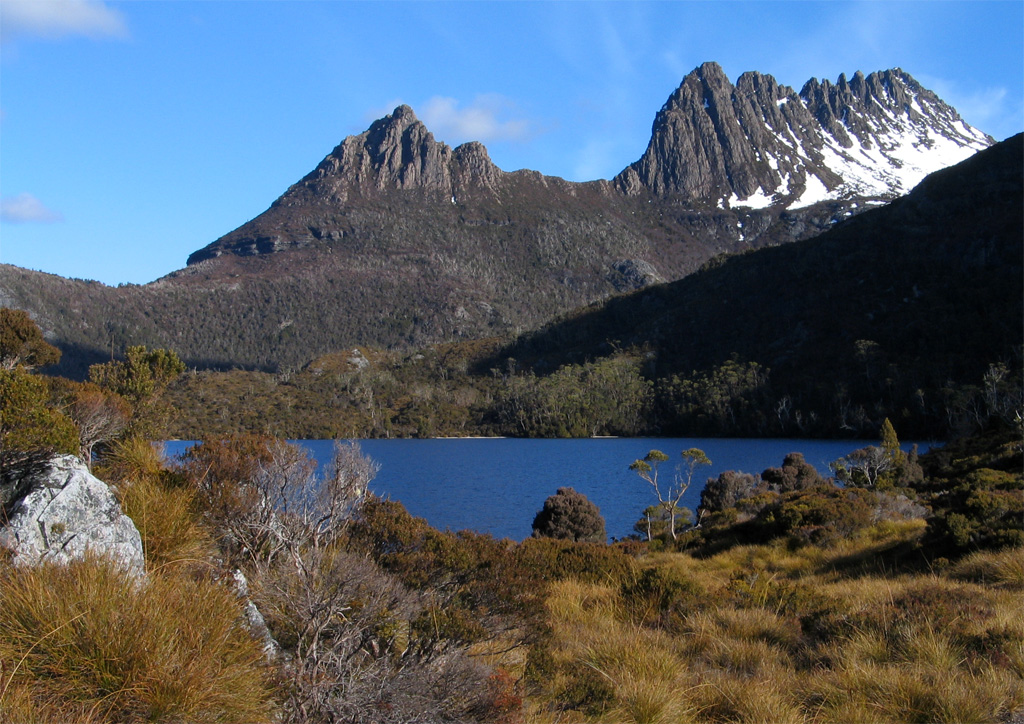
Cradle Mountain in Tasmania's UNESCO World Heritage Wilderness Area

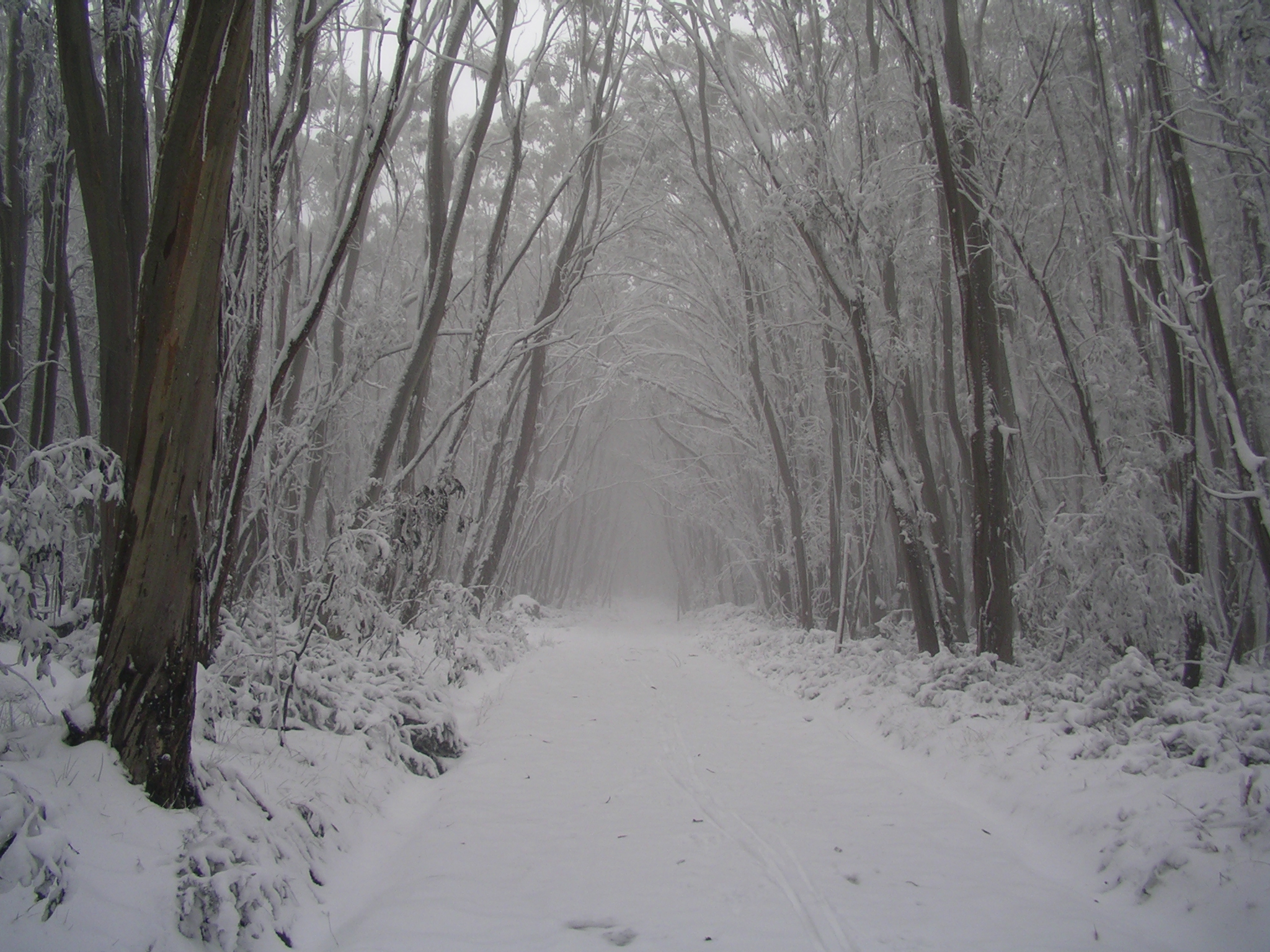
A trail at Lake Mountain cross country ski resort, Victoria.

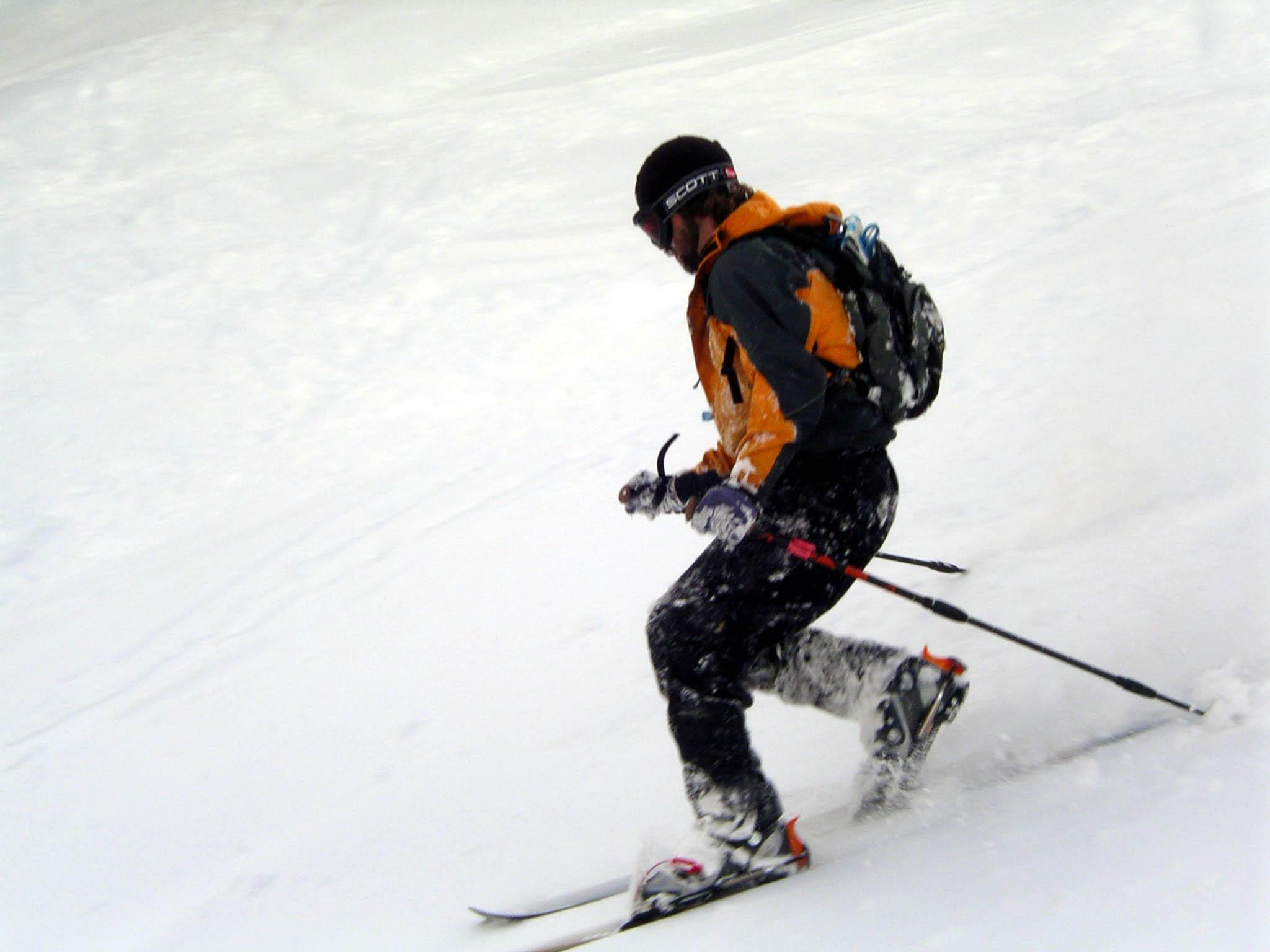
Telemark skier at Mount Stirling cross country ski resort, Victoria

Cross country ski resorts:

- Victoria
  - Falls Creek
  - Lake Mountain
  - Mount Baw Baw/Mount St Gwinear
  - Mount Buffalo
  - Mount Stirling

Major ski locations:

- New South Wales:
  - Kosciuszko National Park
    - Jagungal Wilderness
    - Kiandra
    - Kosciuszko Main Range
  - Bimberi Nature Reserve
- Victoria
  - Alpine National Park
    - Bogong High Plains
    - Mount Bogong
    - Mount Feathertop
  - Baw Baw National Park
  - Lake Mountain
  - Mount Buffalo National Park
- Tasmania
  - Cradle Mountain-Lake St Clair National Park
  - Ben Lomond National Park
  - Mount Field National Park
- Australian Capital Territory
  - Namadgi National Park
    - Mount Ginini
    - Mount Franklin

== Gallery ==
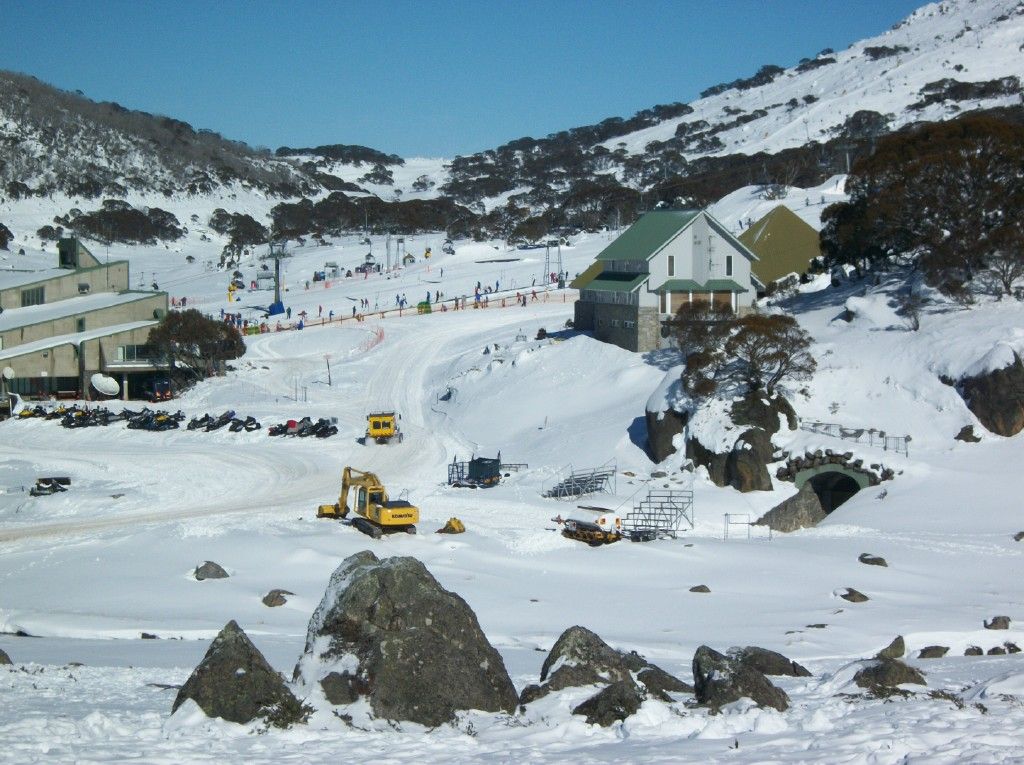
Perisher

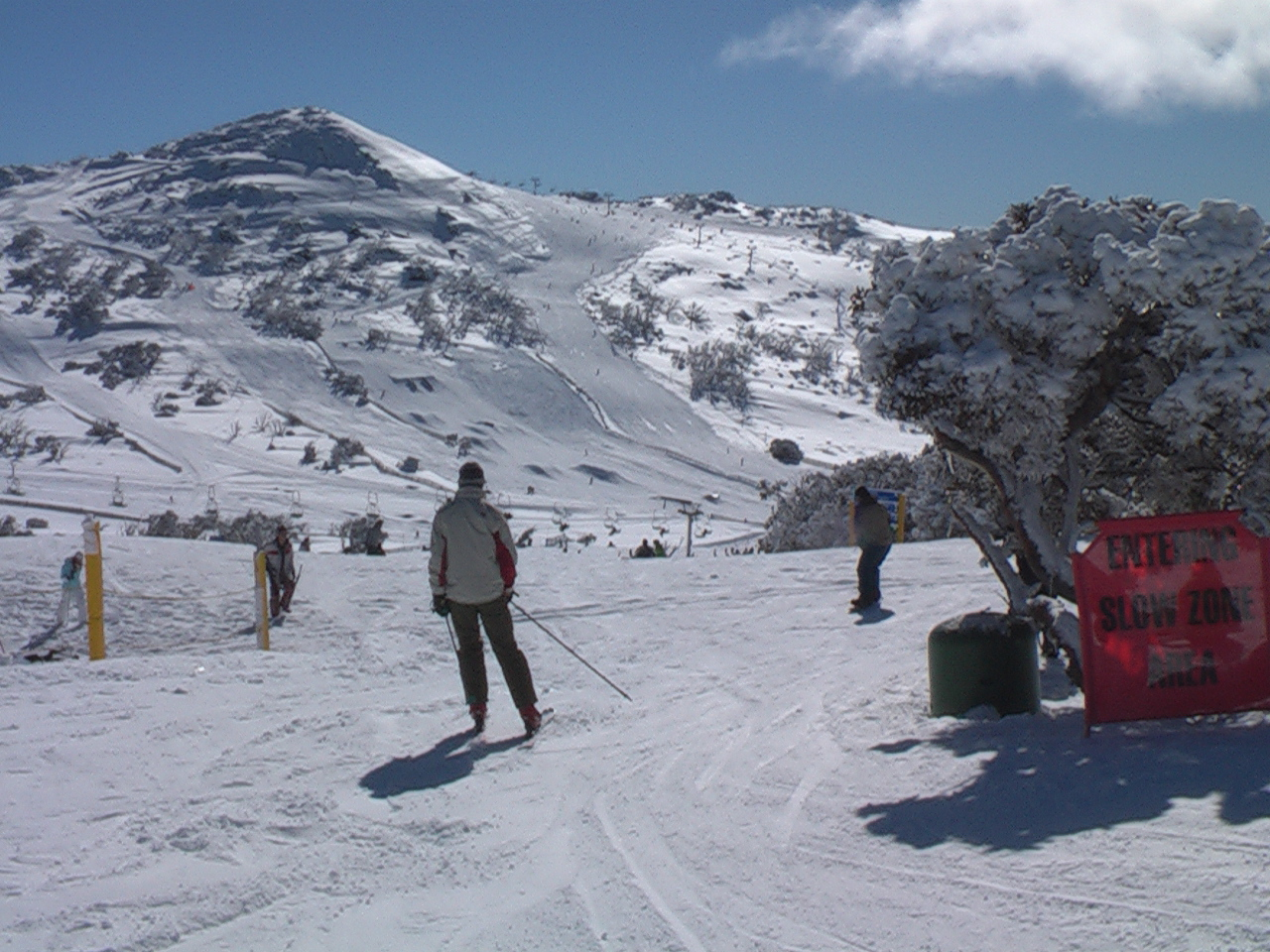
Blue Cow

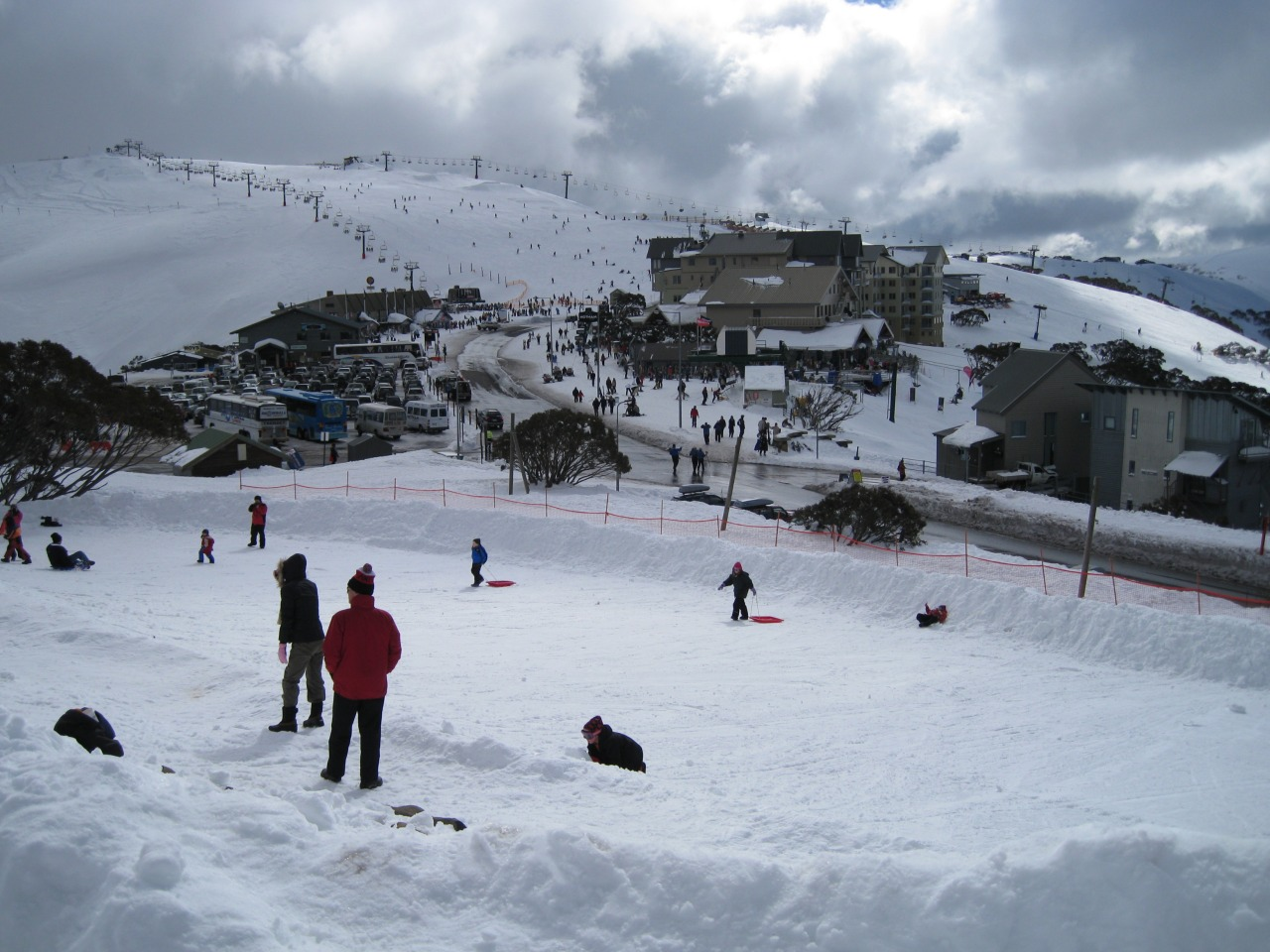
Mount Hotham Village

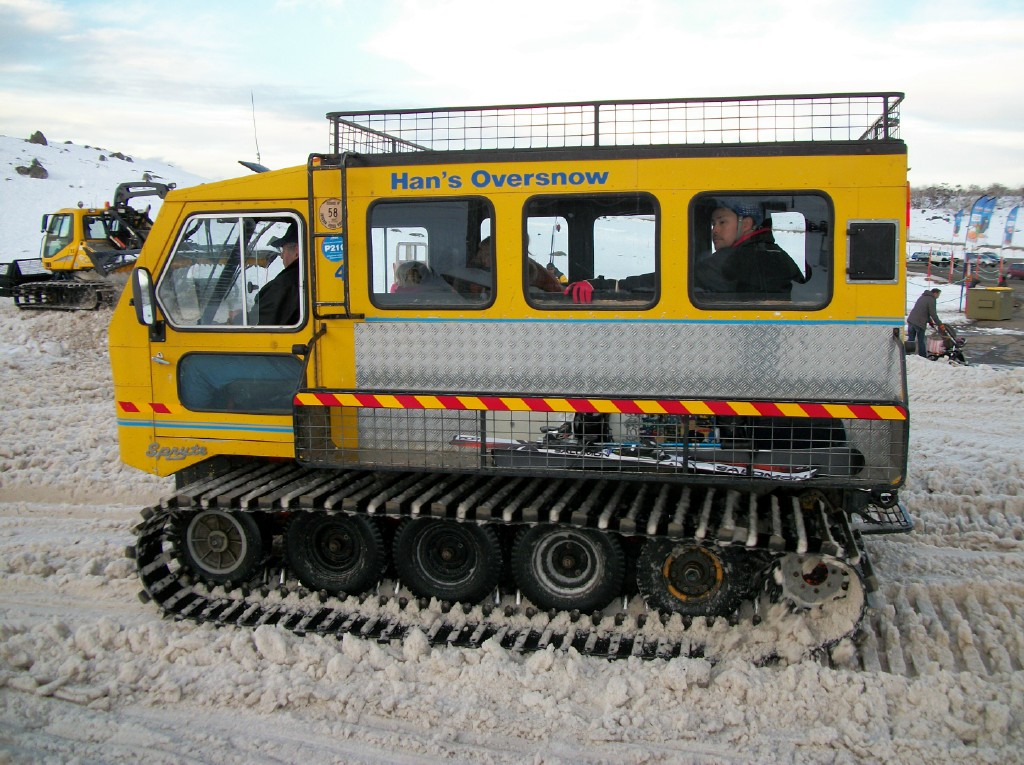
An OverSnow Vehicle at Perisher

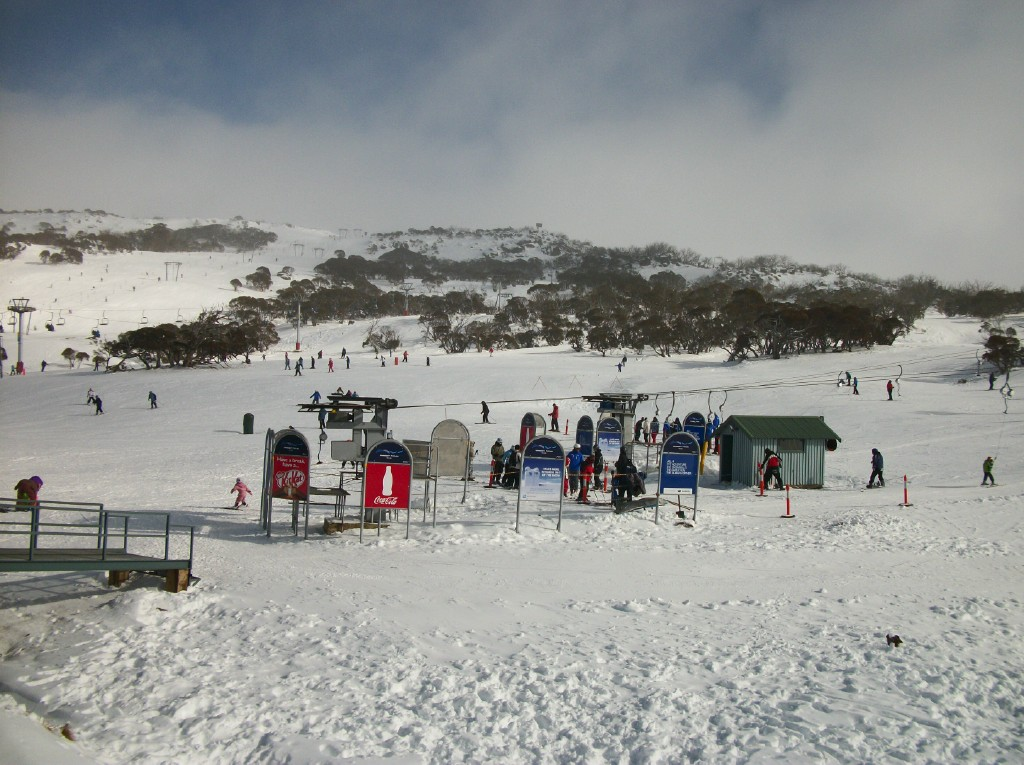
Smiggin Holes

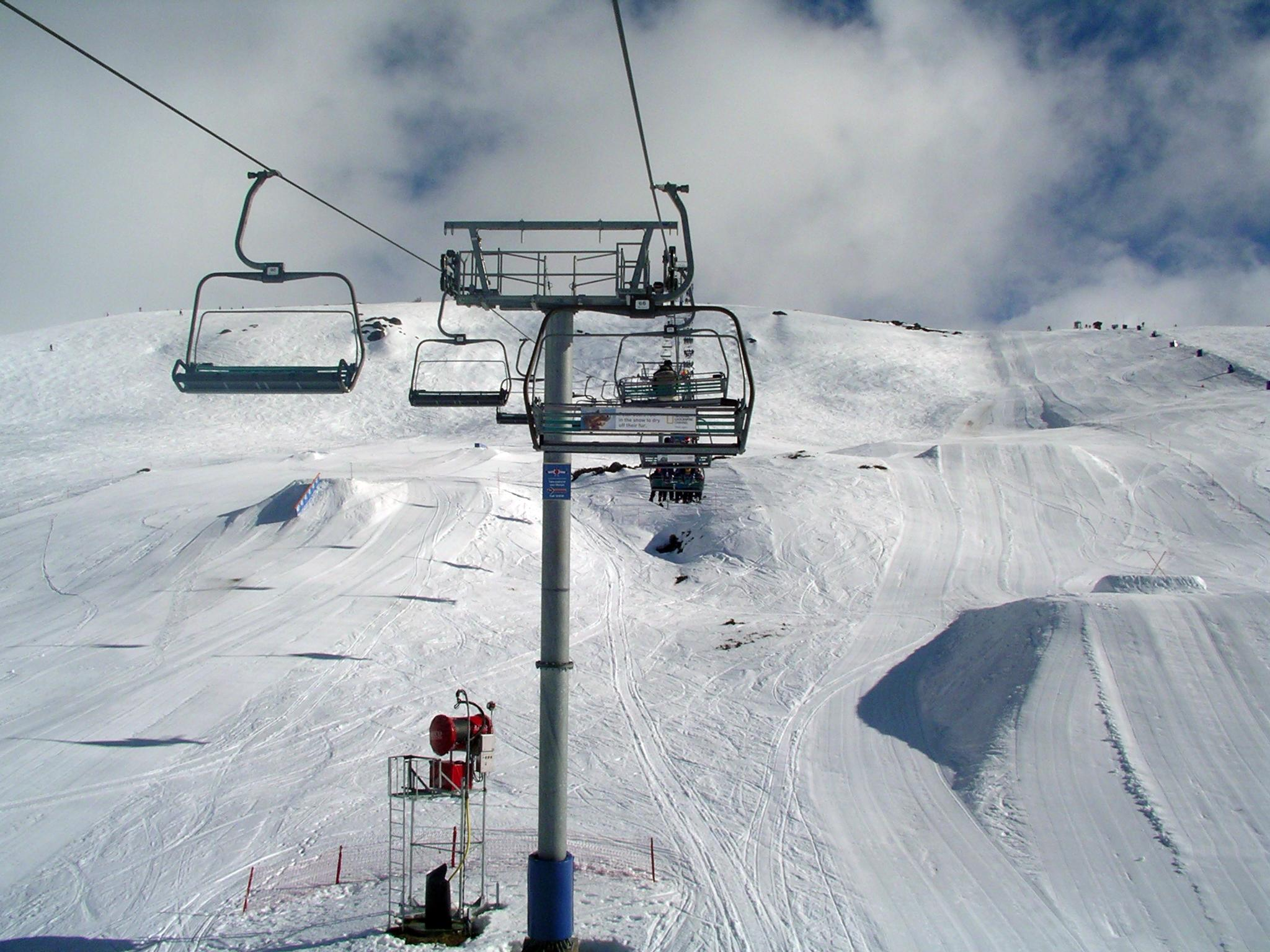
The Ruined Castle chairlift and terrain park, Falls Creek, Victoria

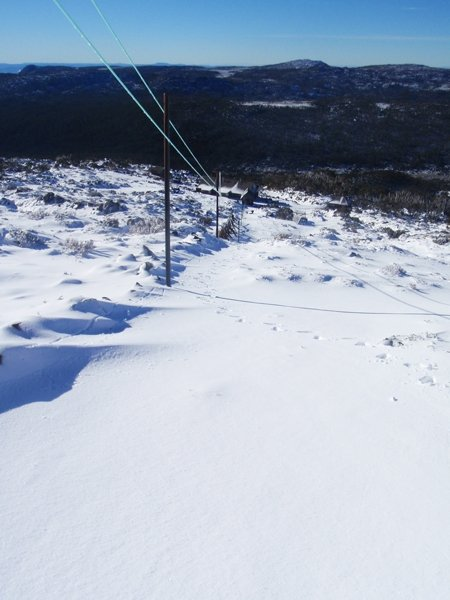
Top of Mount Mawson tow, Tasmania

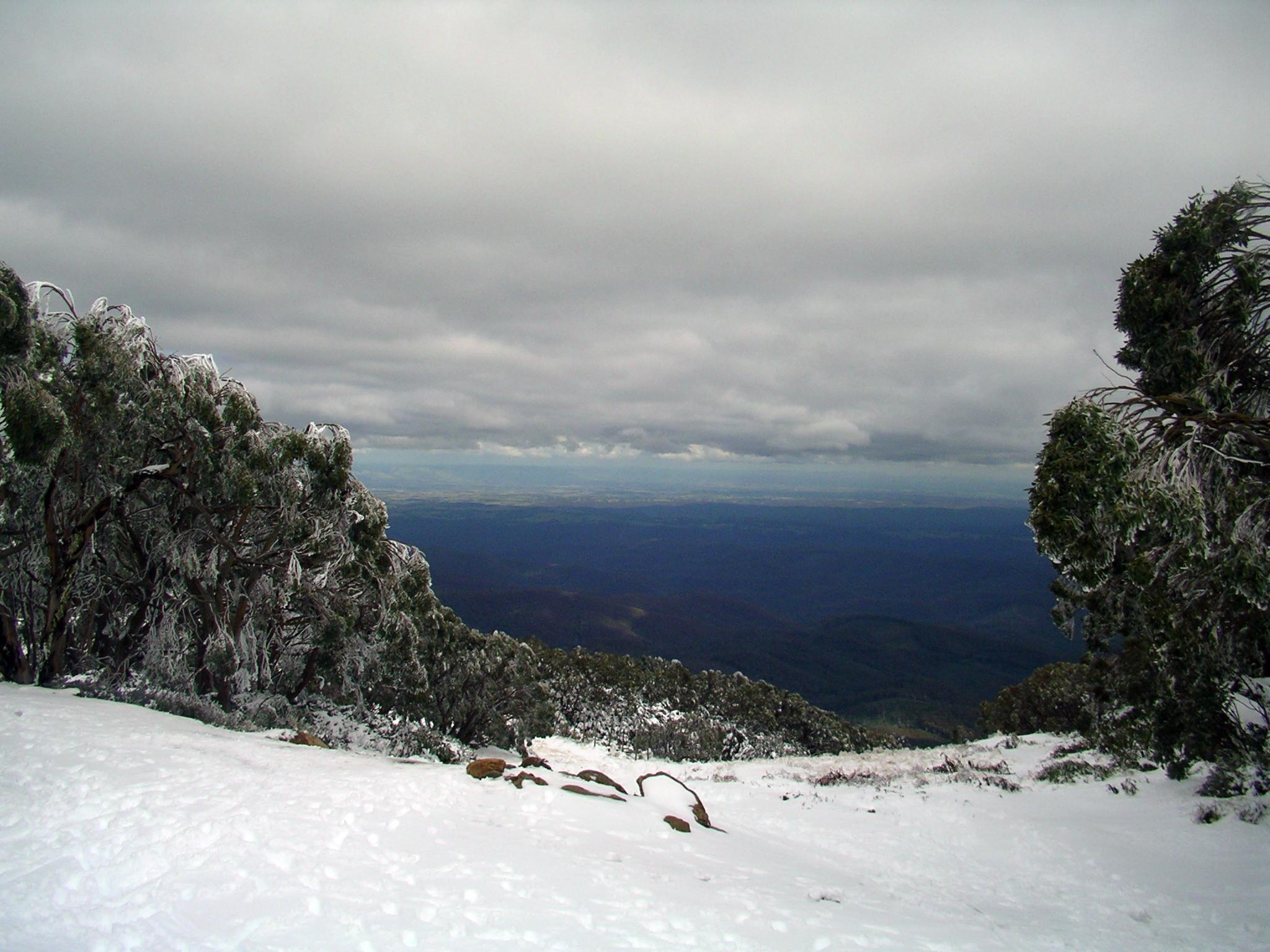
The view across Gippsland from Mount Baw Baw

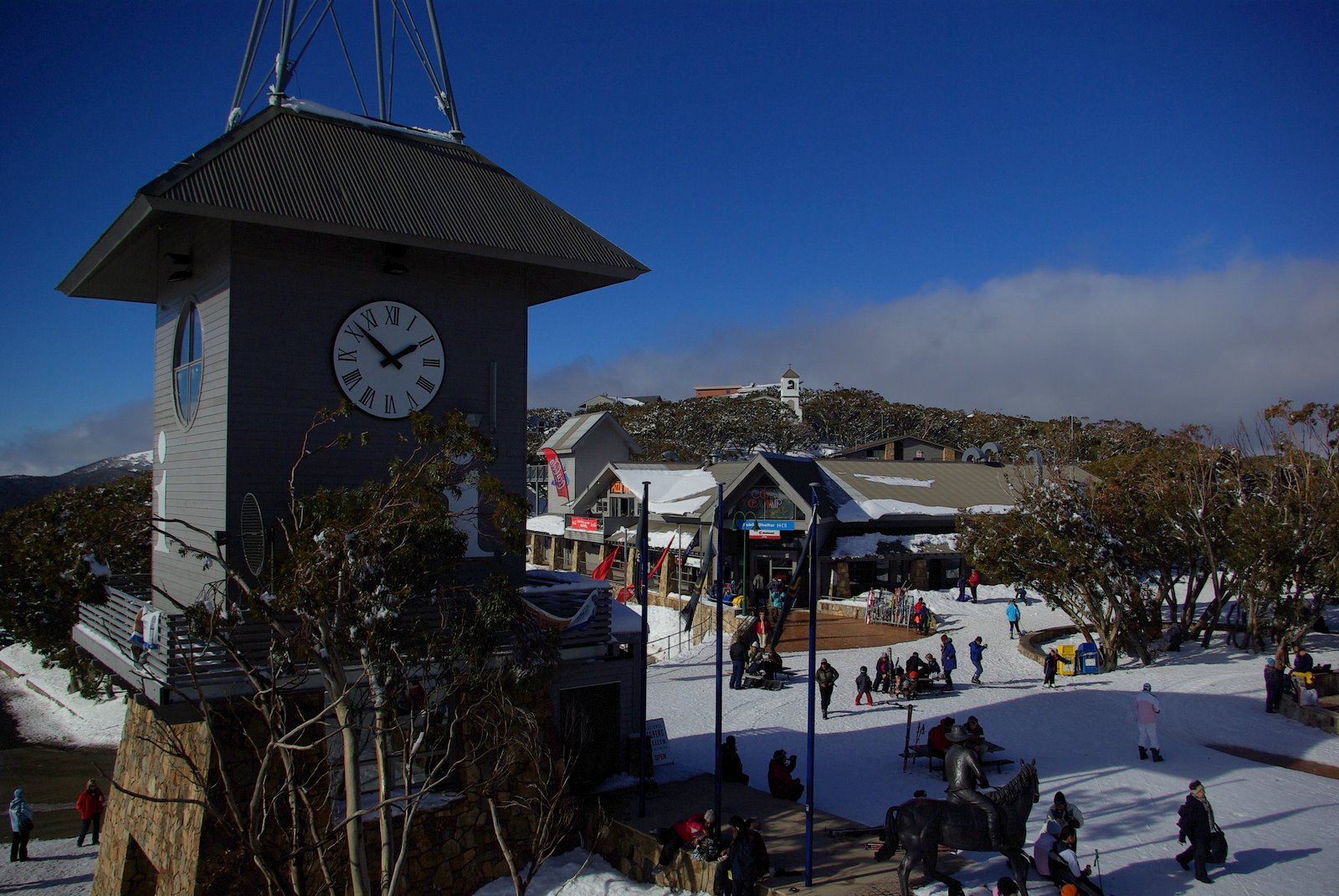
Mount Buller village

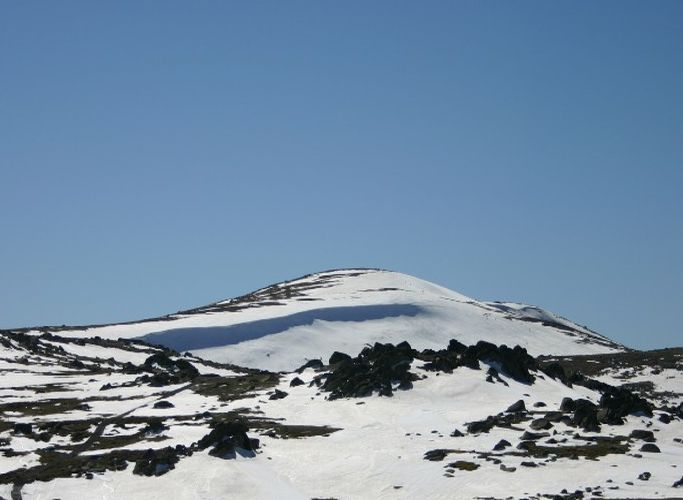
Mount Kosciuszko, New South Wales - Australia's highest peak - October 2006

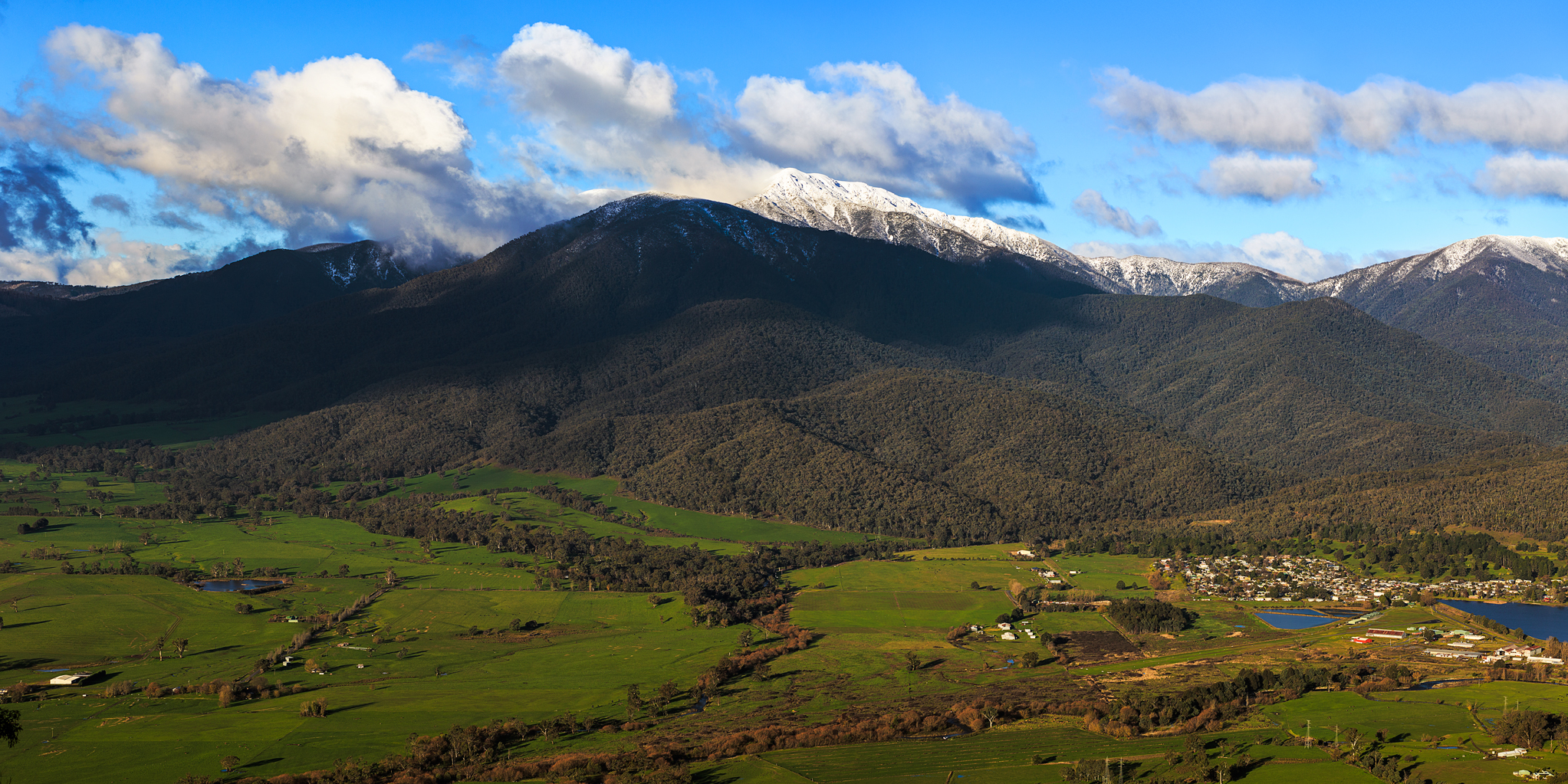
Mount Bogong, the highest mountain in Victoria

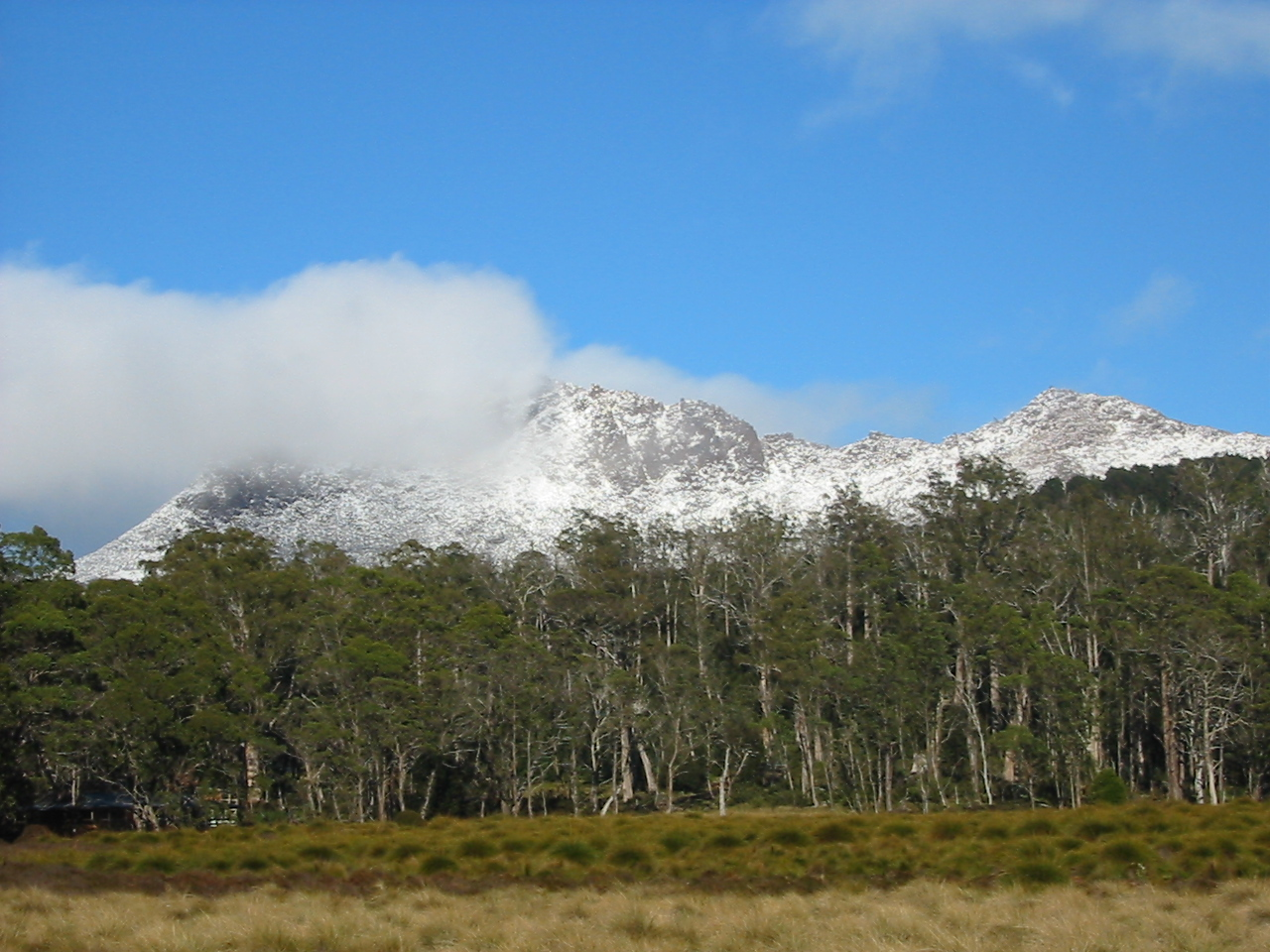
Mount Ossa, the highest mountain in Tasmania, seen from Pelion Plains

== See also ==
- Skiing in Victoria, Australia
- Skiing in New South Wales
- Skiing in Tasmania
- Skiing in the Australian Capital Territory
- List of ski areas and resorts in Australia
- Winter sport in Australia
- Kiandra snow shoe club
