= Gungarlin River =

Coordinates: 36°18′S 148°31′E

Location
- Country: Australia
- State: New South Wales
- Region: Australian Alps (IBRA), Snowy Mountains
- Local government area: Snowy Monaro Regional Council

Physical characteristics
- Source: Munyang Range, Snowy Mountains
  - location: near Adaminaby
  - elevation: 1,660 m (5,450 ft)
- Mouth: confluence with the Snowy River
  - location: northwest of Lake Jindabyne
  - elevation: 1,050 m (3,440 ft)
- Length: 31 km (19 mi)

Basin features
- River system: Snowy River catchment
- Tributaries
  - right: Burrungubugge River, Diggers Creek
- National park: Kosciuszko NP

The Gungarlin River, a perennial river of the Snowy River catchment, is located in the Snowy Mountains region of New South Wales, Australia.

== Course and features ==
The Gungarlin River rises below the Munyang Range, in the southern part of the Kosciuszko National Park, on the slopes of Happy Jacks Plain. The river flows generally south-southeast, then south by west, then west by south, and finally south by west, joined by two tributaries including the Burrungubugge River, before reaching its confluence with the Snowy River. The river descends 606 metres (1,988 ft) over its 31 kilometres (19 mi) course.

The Snowy Mountains Scheme captures water from the lower Gungarlin River at the Gungarlin Weir and diverts water to the Island Bend Reservoir. The Snowy Water Inquiry Outcomes Implementation Deed identifies environmental water allocations to be released from the Gungarlin Weir as part of the Snowy Montane Rivers Increased Flows. The reaches below the weir currently contain no base flow.

== Recreation ==
There are many mountain huts along or close to the river including Daveys Hut, Botherum Plain Hut, Buhlmans, Mrs Caseys, and Kellys Hut.

The Gungarlin River is a popular summer destination for trout fishing, cycling and hiking.

== See also ==
- List of rivers of New South Wales (A–K)
- List of rivers of Australia
- Rivers of New South Wales
- Snowy Mountains Scheme
