= Burrungubugge River =

River in New South Wales

Coordinates: 36°13′S 148°27′E

Location
- Country: Australia
- State: New South Wales
- Region: Australian Alps (IBRA), Snowy Mountains
- Local government area: Snowy Monaro Regional Council

Physical characteristics
- Source: Strumbo Range, Snowy Mountains
  - location: below Bulls Peak
  - elevation: 1,870 m (6,140 ft)
- Mouth: confluence with the Gungarlin River
  - location: northwest of Lake Jindabyne
  - elevation: 1,170 m (3,840 ft)
- Length: 14 km (8.7 mi)

Basin features
- River system: Snowy River catchment
- Tributaries
  - right: Dead Horse Creek
- National park: Kosciuszko NP

The Burrungubugge River, a perennial river of the Snowy River catchment, is located in the Snowy Mountains region of New South Wales, Australia.

== Course and features ==
The Burrungubugge River rises below Bulls Peaks, in the Strumbo Range, within the Kosciuszko National Park. The river flows generally southeast, joined by one minor tributary before reaching its confluence with the Gungarlin River. The river descends 701 metres (2,300 ft) over its 14 kilometres (8.7 mi) course.

== See also ==
- List of rivers of New South Wales (A–K)
- List of rivers of Australia
- Rivers of New South Wales
- Snowy Mountains Scheme
