= Daveys Hut =

- Interactive map of the Daveys Hut area

General information
- Coordinates: 36°13′53.7″S 148°31′57.9″E
- Year built: 1909

Daveys Hut is an Australian alpine hut in the Kosciuszko National Park.

The hut was built in 1909 by grazier Tom Bolton, who moved into it with his new wife, Mary, in 1911. It is now maintained by the Kosciuszko Huts Association as a stopover for hikers, and was listed on the former Register of the National Estate.

Extensive repairs were carried out in 2012, replacing the wooden foundations with brick, repairing broken fittings and doors and relining an interior plywood wall.

A social history of the hut and the Bolton family was published by Pauline Downing in 1998.

== See also ==
- Seaman's Hut
