= Seaman's Hut =

Historic hut in New South Wales, Australia

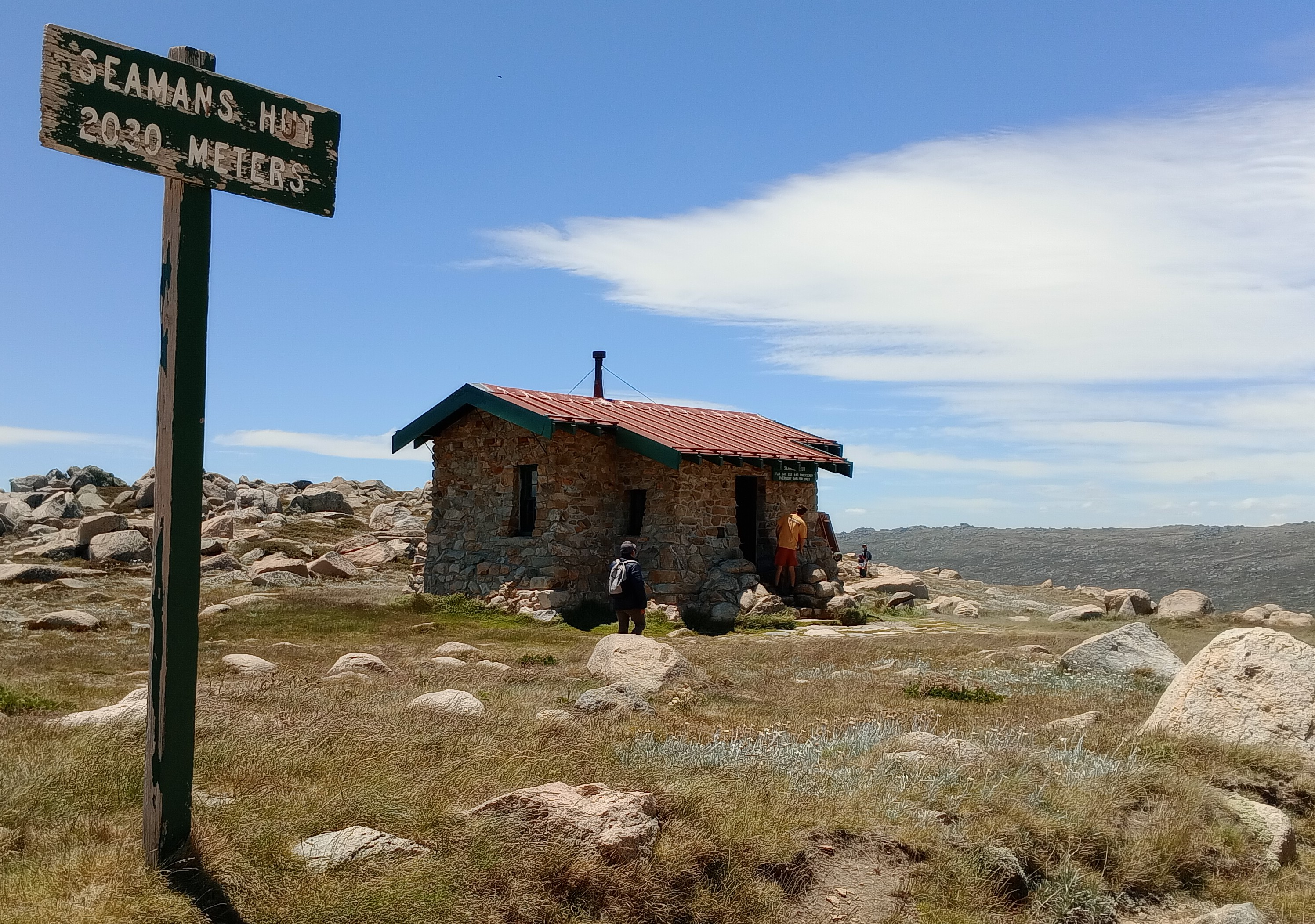
- Seaman's Hut and elevation sign, December 2024.
- Interactive map of the Seaman's Hut area

General information
- Coordinates: 36°27′0.7″S 148°16′58.1″E
- Year built: 1929

Seaman's Hut is an alpine hut and memorial located in New South Wales, Australia. It was built following the death of two skiers, W. Laurie Seaman and Evan Hayes in 1928. Seaman's family built the hut to provide shelter to future users of the park, in order to prevent recurrence of a similar tragedy, which it has since done.

Seaman's hut is built primarily of stone with plank flooring. The interior consists of two rooms and a foyer for firewood storage.

It is located on Etheridge Range, 6 km from Charlottes Pass on the road to Mount Kosciuszko.

== History ==
The site on Etheridge Range was chosen by W. H. Seaman, to build a shelter in memory of his son Laurie Seaman, who died of exposure in 1928 at the same location. The hut was officially opened by Mr F. Chaffey and a small group, on a Friday 17 May 1929.

== Access ==
Foot, skis or Mountain bike along road from Charlotte Pass (closed to vehicle access), or walking/skiing trails from Thredbo or Guthega.

== Usage ==
This hut is intended for emergency shelter overnight and for day use. It is well-stocked with firewood and also holds emergency supplies of dried food. The food supplies are stocked by goodwill of hikers and are not maintained officially by the National Parks.

== See also ==
- Daveys Hut
