= Orenstein & Koppel =

German engineering company

Orenstein & Koppel Orenstein und Koppel
- Type: Public
- Industry: Manufacturing
- Founded: 1 April 1876; 150 years ago
- Founder: Benno Orenstein; Arthur Koppel
- Defunct: 1 January 1999; 27 years ago
- Fate: Acquired
- Area served: Worldwide
- Products: Railway vehicles Heavy equipment Escalators
- Parent: New Holland Construction

Orenstein & Koppel (O&K) was a major German engineering company specialising in railway vehicles, escalators, and heavy equipment. It was founded on April 1, 1876, in Berlin by Benno Orenstein and Arthur Koppel.

Originally a general engineering company, O&K soon started to specialise in the manufacture of railway vehicles. The company also manufactured heavy equipment and escalators. O&K pulled out of the railway business in 1981. Its escalator-manufacturing division was spun off to the company's majority shareholder at the time, Friedrich Krupp AG Hoesch-Krupp, in 1996, leaving the company to focus primarily on construction machines. The construction-equipment business was sold to New Holland Construction, at the time part of the Fiat Group, in 1999.

== Founding and railway work ==
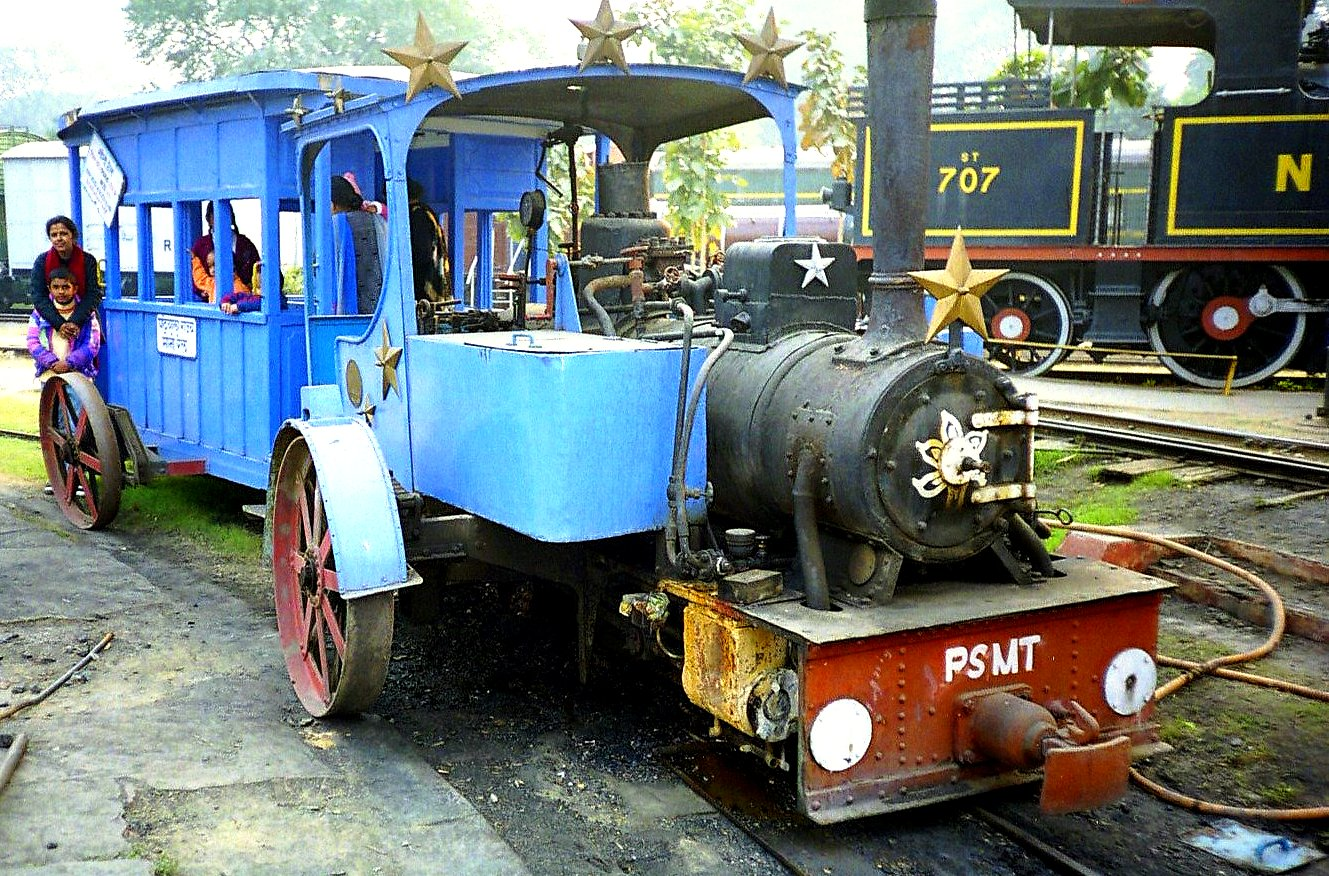
Steam engine manufactured for Patiala State Monorail Trainways, now at National Rail Museum, New Delhi

The Orenstein & Koppel Company was a mechanical-engineering firm that first entered the railway-construction field, building locomotives and other railroad cars.

First founded in 1892 in Schlachtensee, in the Zehlendorf district of Berlin, and known as the Märkische Lokomotivfabrik, the O&K factories expanded to supply the Imperial German Army under Kaiser Wilhelm II with field-service locomotives, or Feldbahn. O&K supplied all manner of railway equipment to the Army. Because of strained capacity at the Schlachtensee shops, work transferred in 1899 to a site in Nowawes, later Babelsberg, near Potsdam. Around 1908, O&K acquired the firm of Gerlach and König in Nordhausen, building petrol and diesel locomotives there under the trade mark "Montania".

== Diversification ==
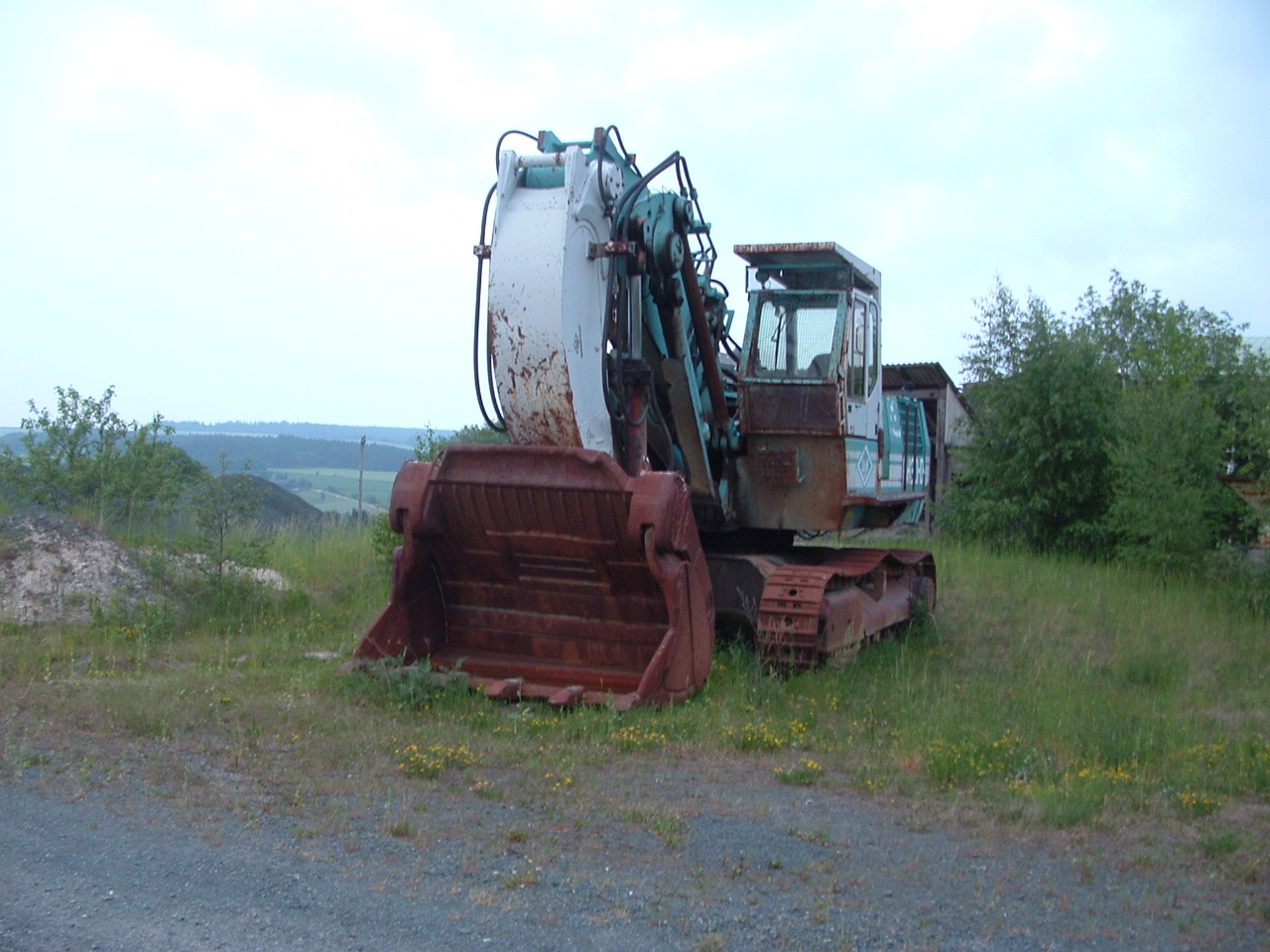
Excavator from O&K

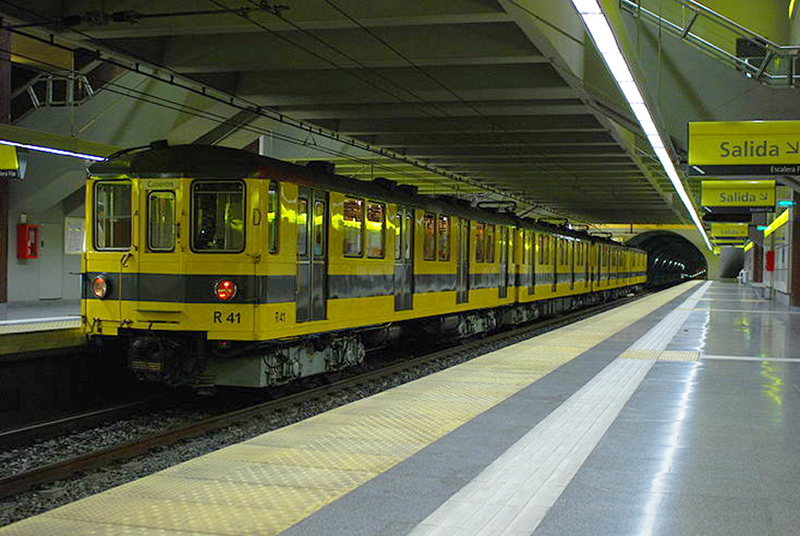
Siemens-Schuckert Orenstein & Koppel underground trains built for the Buenos Aires Underground from 1934 to 1944.

O&K expanded to build freight and passenger cars, and above all, excavators for construction. The company also built other heavy equipment, including graders, dump trucks, forklift trucks, compressors, crawler loaders, wheeled loaders, road rollers, and truck cranes.

The company also began manufacturing escalators, transmissions, rapid-transit railway lines, buses, tractors, and cargo ships. Passenger liners, shipboard cranes, and shipbuilding enterprises rounded out the company's profile. Because of the company's thriving export business, a worldwide system of branch offices was created.

In the early years of the 20th century, O&K built bucket chain trenchers, at first from wood, and—after 1904—completely from steel. These were propelled by steam or oil engines. O&K also made railway trenchers for work in heavy soils.

In the First World War, O&K built railway engines and cars of all sizes for the German government. With the collapse of Imperial Germany in November 1918, the victorious Allies put further restrictions on German manufacturing and military capacity, seizing all army Feldbahn engines as per the terms of the Versailles Treaty that ended the First World War. The treaty also removed access to export markets; at the end of 1925, work stopped for three months as a result of the lost business. By 1935, business had recovered and the company produced 5,299 locomotives. After the war, O&K's American subsidiary, the Orenstein-Arthur Koppel Company, was seized by the Alien Property Custodian and sold at an auction where only United States citizens were allowed to place bids.

Besides the Feldbahn contracts, the company produced Series 50 steam locomotives and standard gauge vehicles in the 1930s. They also delivered some broad gauge CSÉT shunting locomotives with a gauge of 5 ft 3 in (1,600 mm) to the Irish Sugar Company (Comlucht Siúcre Éireann) in Ireland (2 of which have been preserved). The company produced diesel locomotives, and Series 44 and Series 50 steam engines, for the national railway company, Deutsche Reichsbahn-Gesellschaft.

In 1922, they manufactured their first continuous-track steam shovel. In 1926, diesel engines replaced steam engines; the company converted earlier steam units to diesel power as the need arose. O&K merged with a kerosene-engine builder, selling the engines under the O&K banner.

== Nazi era and the Second World War ==
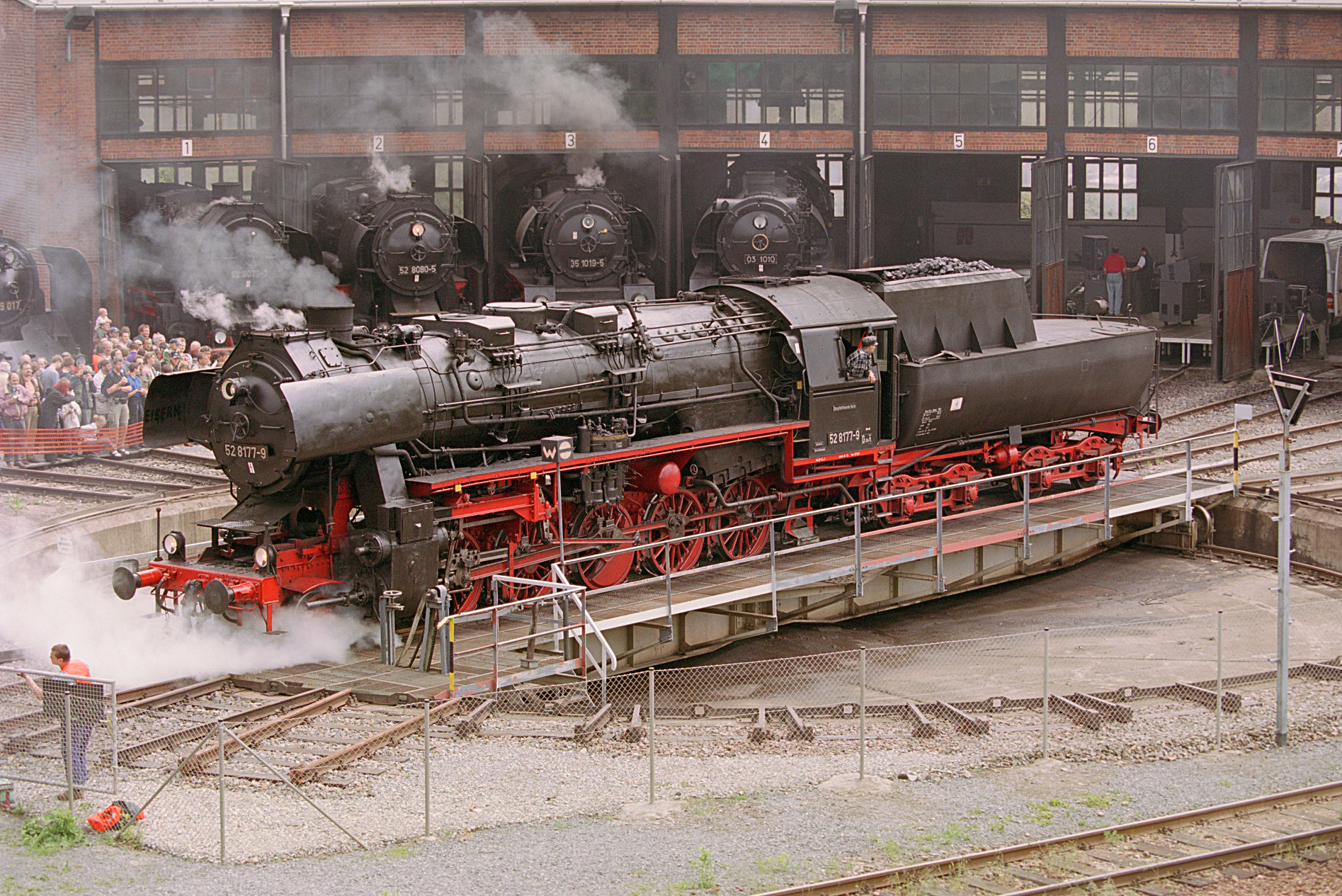
Kriegslokomotive built by O&K

At the Spandau factory, O&K built cable-operated excavators and bucket-wheel excavators for use in the lignite coal mines of eastern Germany. Under the Aryanisation scheme of Adolf Hitler's Nazi Germany, the Orenstein family's shares in the company were forcibly sold in 1935; Orenstein and Koppel was placed under trust administration, and the Babelsberger works were taken over and renamed in 1941. O&K existed in name only, but more commonly used the abbreviation MBA (Maschienenbau und Bahnbedarf AG).

After heavy bomb attacks on Berlin caused a fire in the company's plant-administration buildings, factory production minister Albert Speer redistributed work and factories around the country to lessen the risk from a single attack. For the remainder of World War II, no more locomotives were built in Berlin. Four hundred and twenty-one locomotives already under construction were shifted to Prague to protect the existing factories. During the war, O&K provided 400 Class 52 locomotives.

== East Germany ==
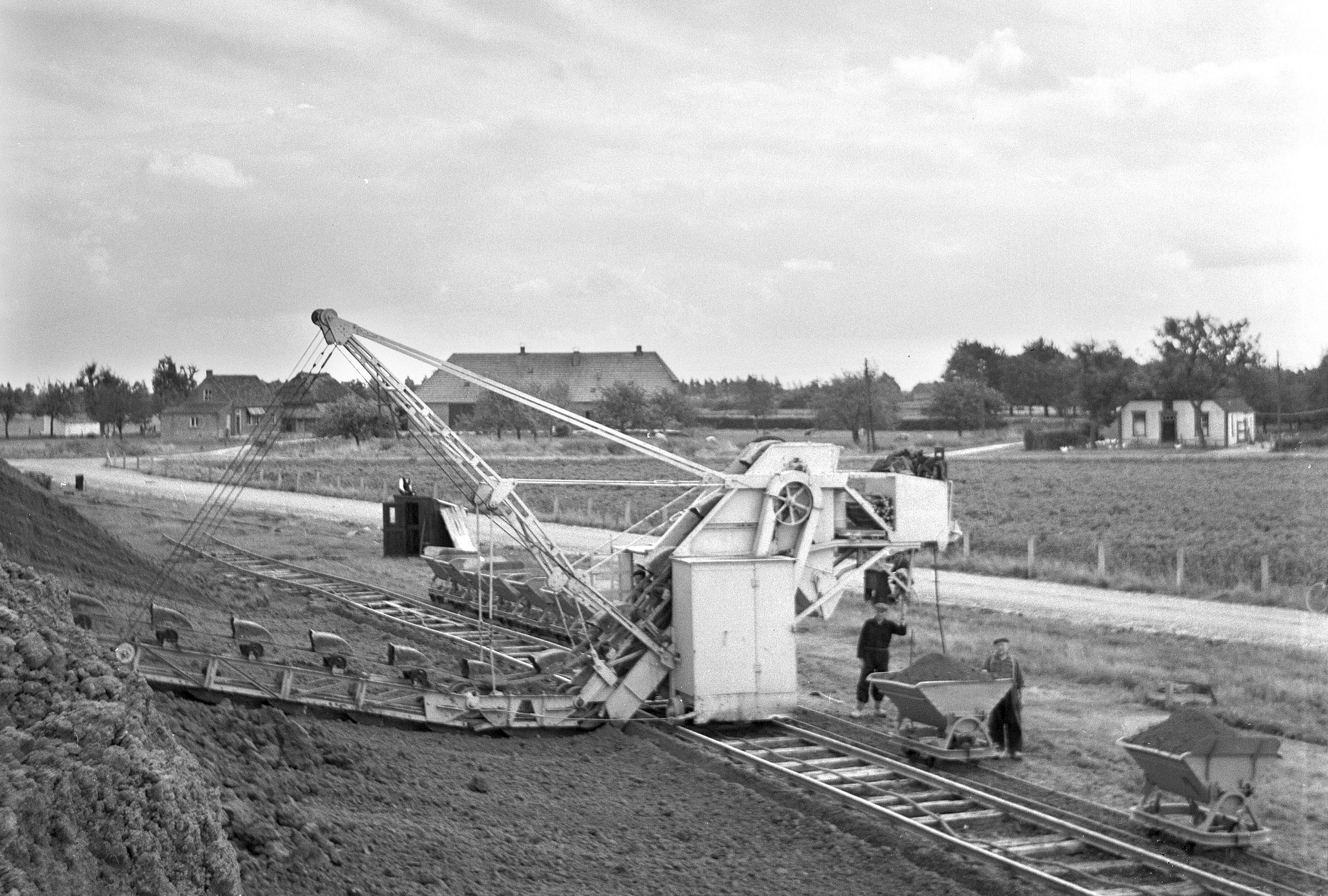
Excavator from O&K in 1957

After the end of the war, the locomotive plant in Nordhausen went idle. Under the German Democratic Republic, O&K changed its name to the VEB Company, and resumed heavy mechanical manufacturing at Nordhausen, producing cable-operated excavator shovels, among other things.

By 1946, the Babelsberg factory resumed production of locomotive boilers, and one year later the plant delivered its first postwar locomotive.

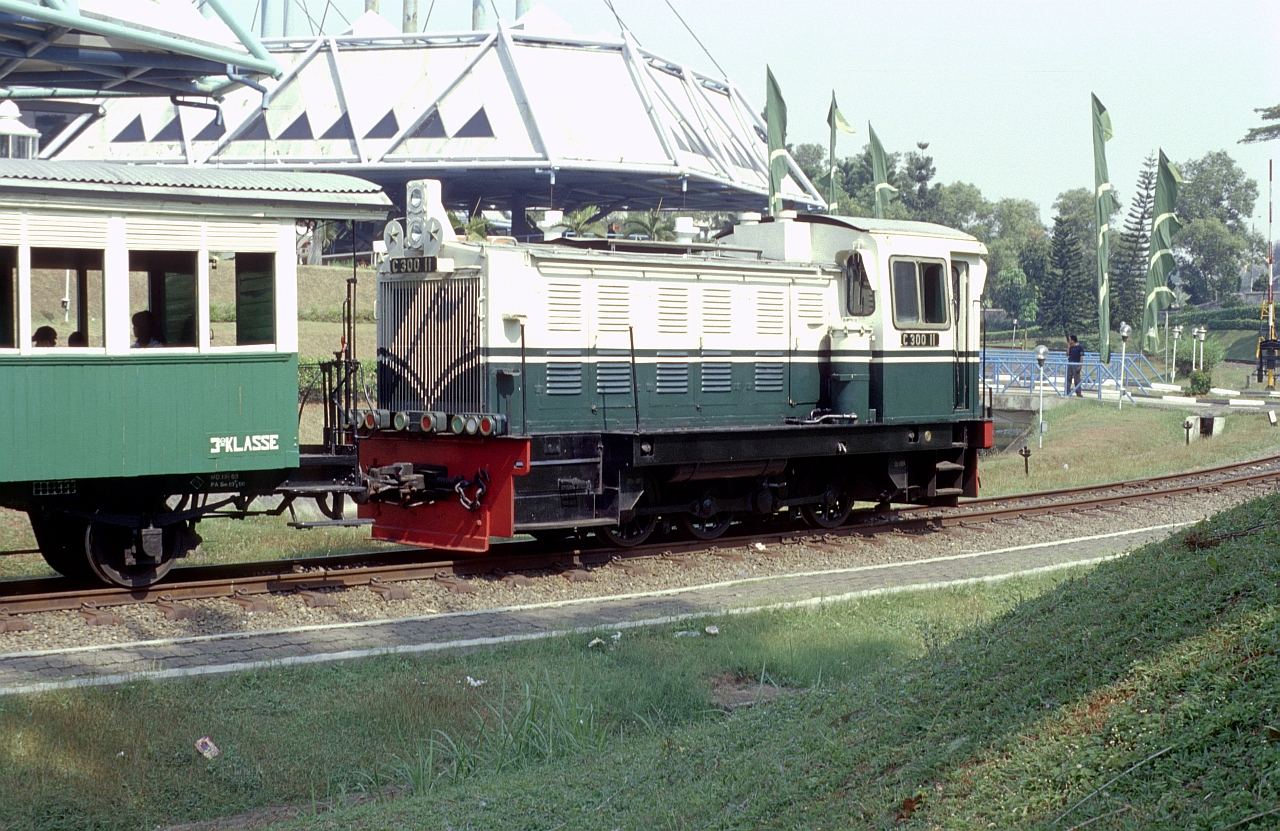
Indonesian Railways C300 in 2002

The German Democratic Republic nationalised the railroads and rolling stock manufacturers. The O&K plants in Babelsberg were renamed the LOWA Lokomotiv Plant Karl Marx (LKM). The LKM became the sole manufacturer of diesel locomotives for the GDR, such as the large DR V 180. In the late 1950s, the plant developed steam and diesel engines for the Deutsche Reichsbahn narrow-gauge railways, building approximately 4,160 engines. The LKM also produced locomotives for foreign orders. The Indonesian State Railways ordered 20 units of C300 class diesel shunters in 1966 and were delivered in 1967.

Construction of steam locomotives ended in 1969, leaving diesel-hydraulic locomotives as the company's priority. The company's last diesel locomotive was the DR V 60, manufactured until 1976. Over the course of 30 years as LKM, the company produced approximately 7,760 locomotives; about a third of that number were manufactured for export.

By 1964, the company had expanded into air-conditioning and refrigeration technology.

== West Germany ==
In West Germany, the enterprise resumed operation after World War II in 1949, under the name Orenstein & Koppel AG, with headquarters in Berlin. In 1950, it incorporated under that name after merging with the Lübecker Crane Company. After the construction of the Berlin Wall in 1961, the head office moved to Dortmund.

By the mid-1970s, the enterprise had grown steadily. In 1972, O&K had five working plants: West Berlin, Dortmund, Hagen, Hattingen/Ruhr, and Lübeck; it maintained a central spare-parts service in Bochum. That year, the company had 8,530 employees. The company had 24 business and sales offices in West Germany, and agencies on all five populated continents.

The West German company emphasised the manufacture of railroad cars and construction equipment, particularly excavators. In 1961, O&K manufactured Europe's first series of fully hydraulic excavators. They manufactured over 55,000 hydraulic excavators; more than 700 of those were rated at over 100 tons' service weight. O&K also manufactured the world's largest hydraulic excavator, at 900 tons' service weight with a shovel capacity of over 52 cubic metres (68 cu yd) and an engine output of 2,984 kilowatts (4,055 HP).

The company also diversified into escalator manufacturing.

O&K excavator RH40-B in action at the open pit mining site Lhoist in Menden, Germany

== Decline ==
After 1964, the railway-manufacturing unit was separated from the other production units.

The railway business was transferred to Bombardier, which continued to manufacture rolling stock in Berlin. The Babelsberg site became an industrial park.

The escalator-manufacturing division was sold to the company's majority shareholder at the time, Friedrich Krupp AG Hoesch-Krupp, in 1996.

The mining-equipment business was sold to Terex in 1997 and went over Bucyrus to Caterpillar Inc.

The construction-equipment business was sold to New Holland Construction, at the time part of the Fiat Group, in 1999.

== Steam locomotives ==
=== Tank locomotives with two coupled axles (Type 0-4-0) ===
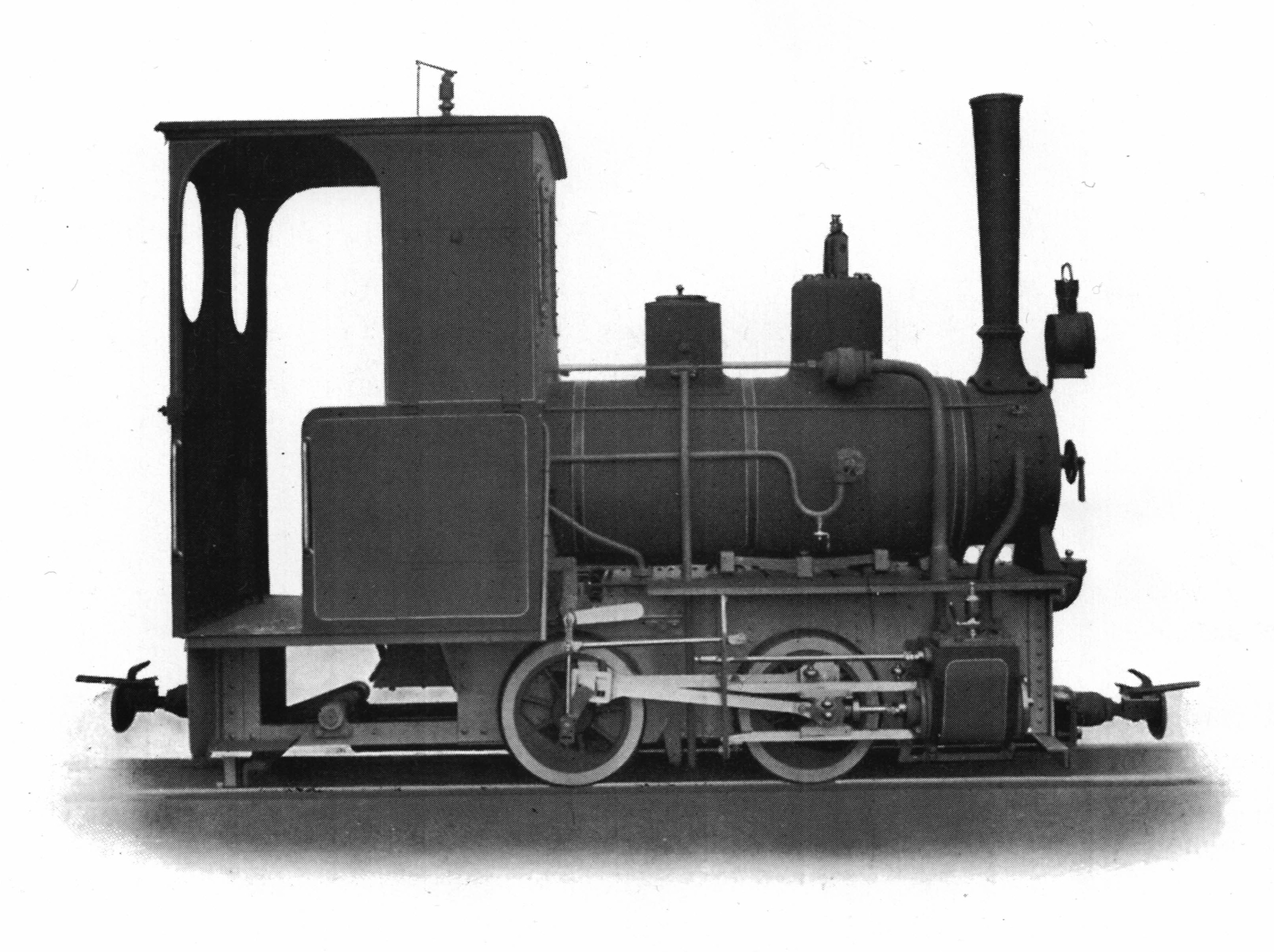
0-4-0, 20 hp, 600 mm, 5.4 t

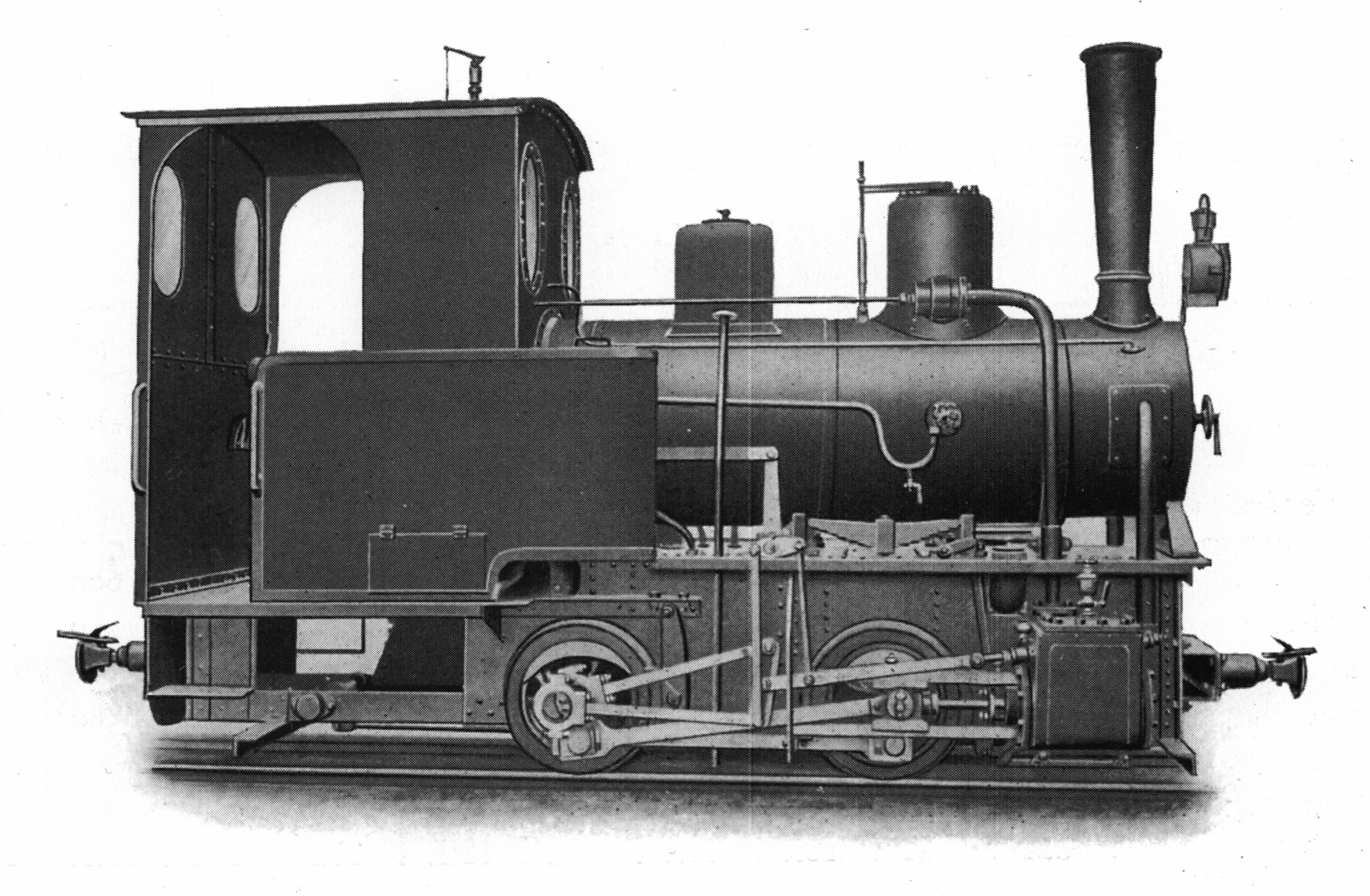
0-4-0, 50 hp, 750 mm, 8.8 t

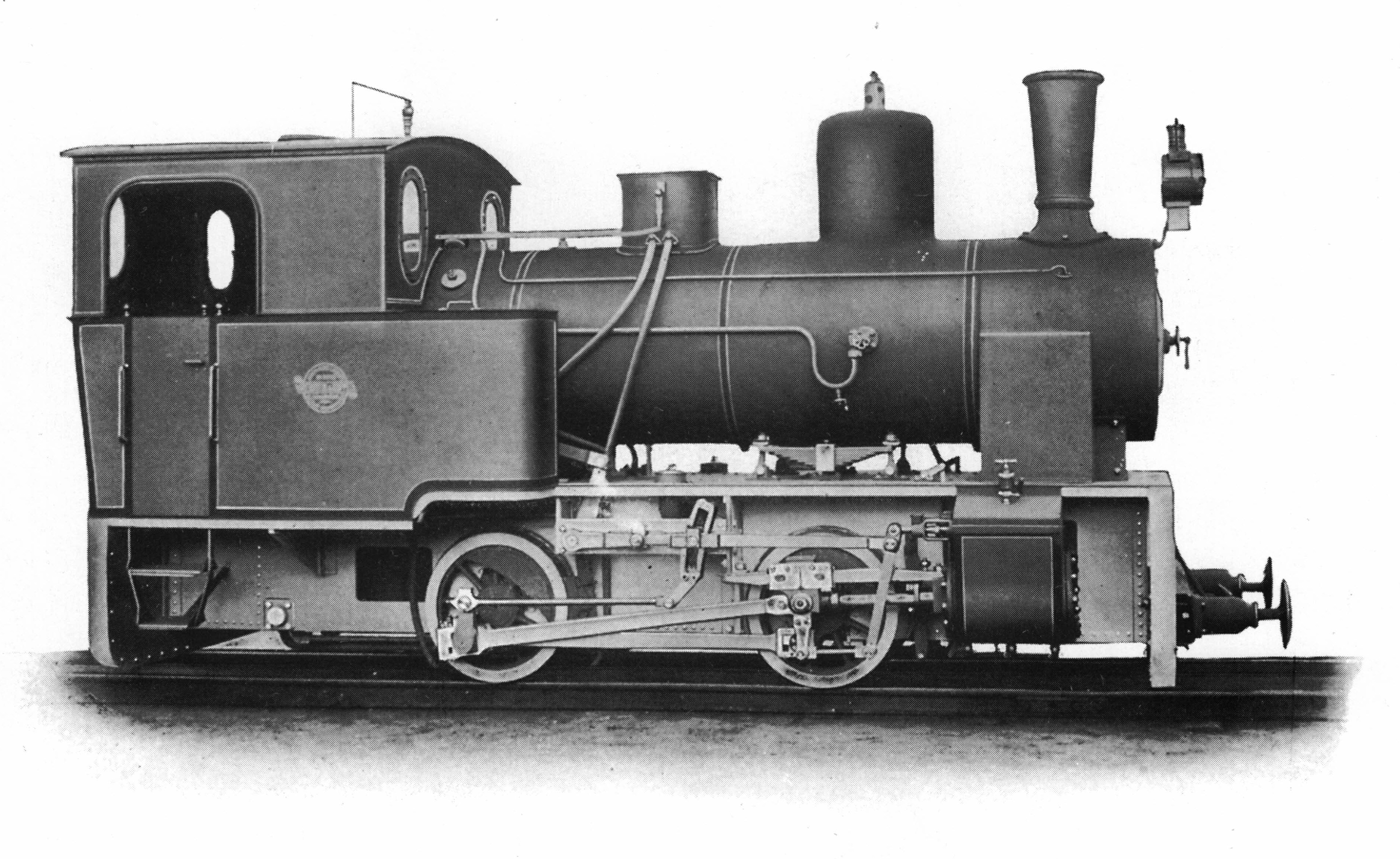
0-4-0, 160 hp, 900 mm, 21 t

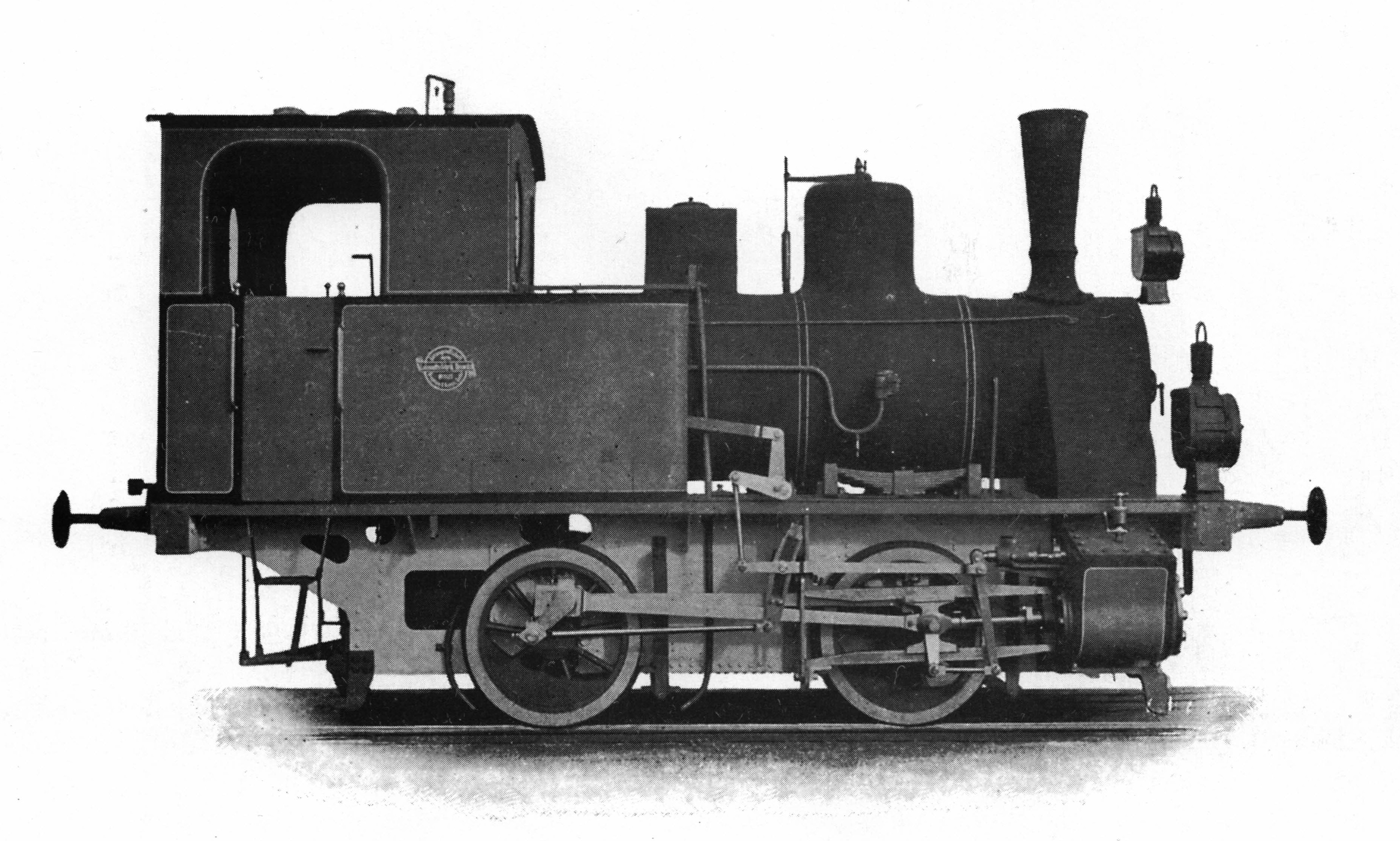
0-4-0, 110 hp, 1,435 mm (4 ft 8 1/2 in), 17.5 t

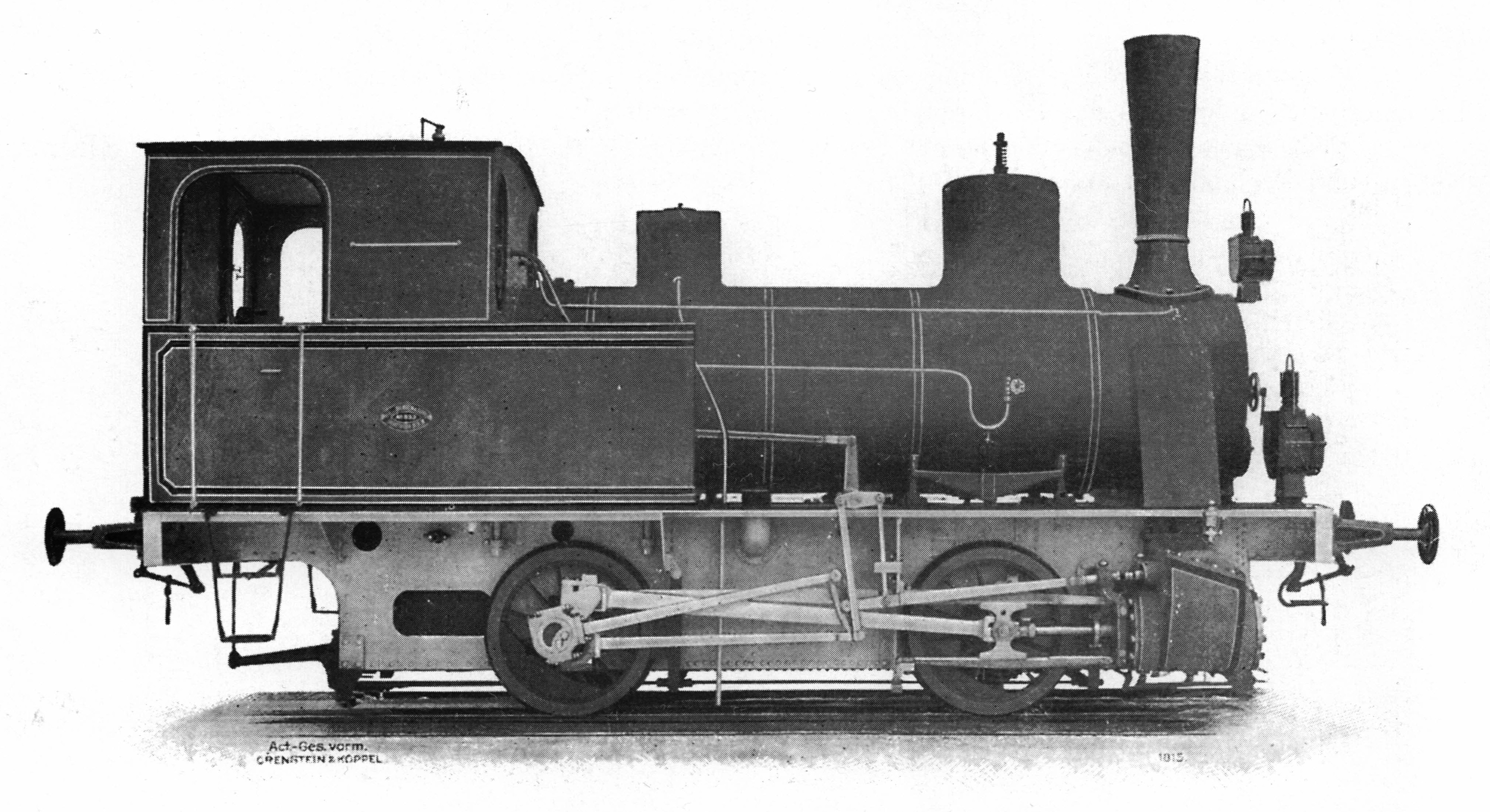
0-4-0, 250 hp, 1,435 mm (4 ft 8 1/2 in), 28 t

Based on O&K's experience, they have created a number of type 0-4-0 standard designs, which have proven to be particularly suitable for many companies. Locomotives of these standard designs were always under construction, and locomotives of the most common strengths were always in stock, so that they could be dispatched immediately on request. Two-axle locomotives were mainly used by construction companies and industrial establishments; accordingly, special emphasis was placed on simple and practical construction. In particular, the locomotives were characterised by high tractive power, while the smaller types were generally based on a lower speed in favour of tractive power.

The standard-gauge locomotives in this category were particularly suitable for shunting and for operating purposes on branch lines.

For light railways, especially for narrow-gauge railways, with steep gradients, tight curves and generally a light superstructure and substructure, locomotives with only two axles did often not meet the requirements in terms of tractive force and caused wear of the track and the wheel tyres due to their wheel load. Therefore, larger locomotives with more axles were available, as shown below.

=== Tank locomotives with three coupled axles (Type 0-6-0) ===
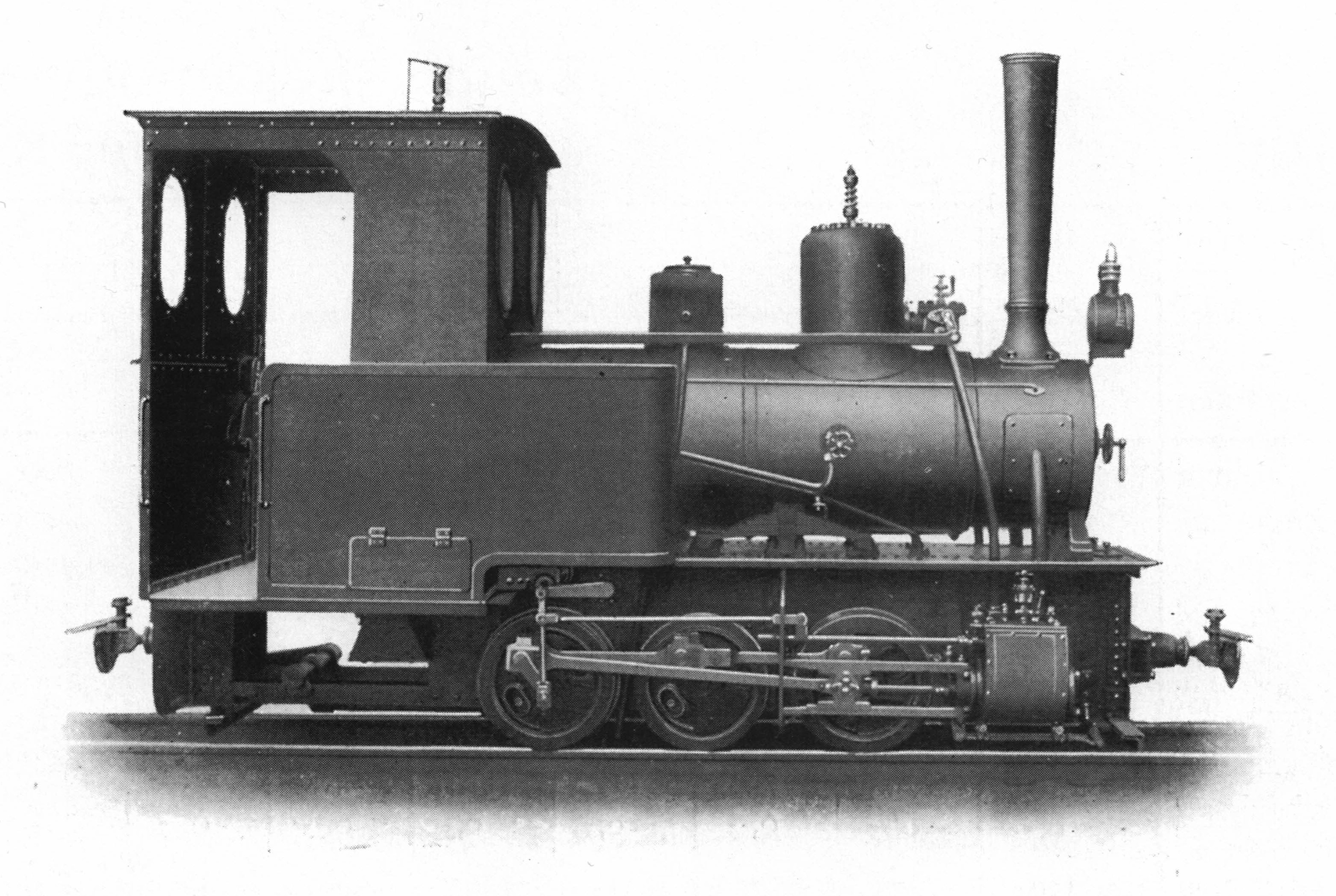
0-6-0, 20 hp, 600 mm 5.8 t, coal fired

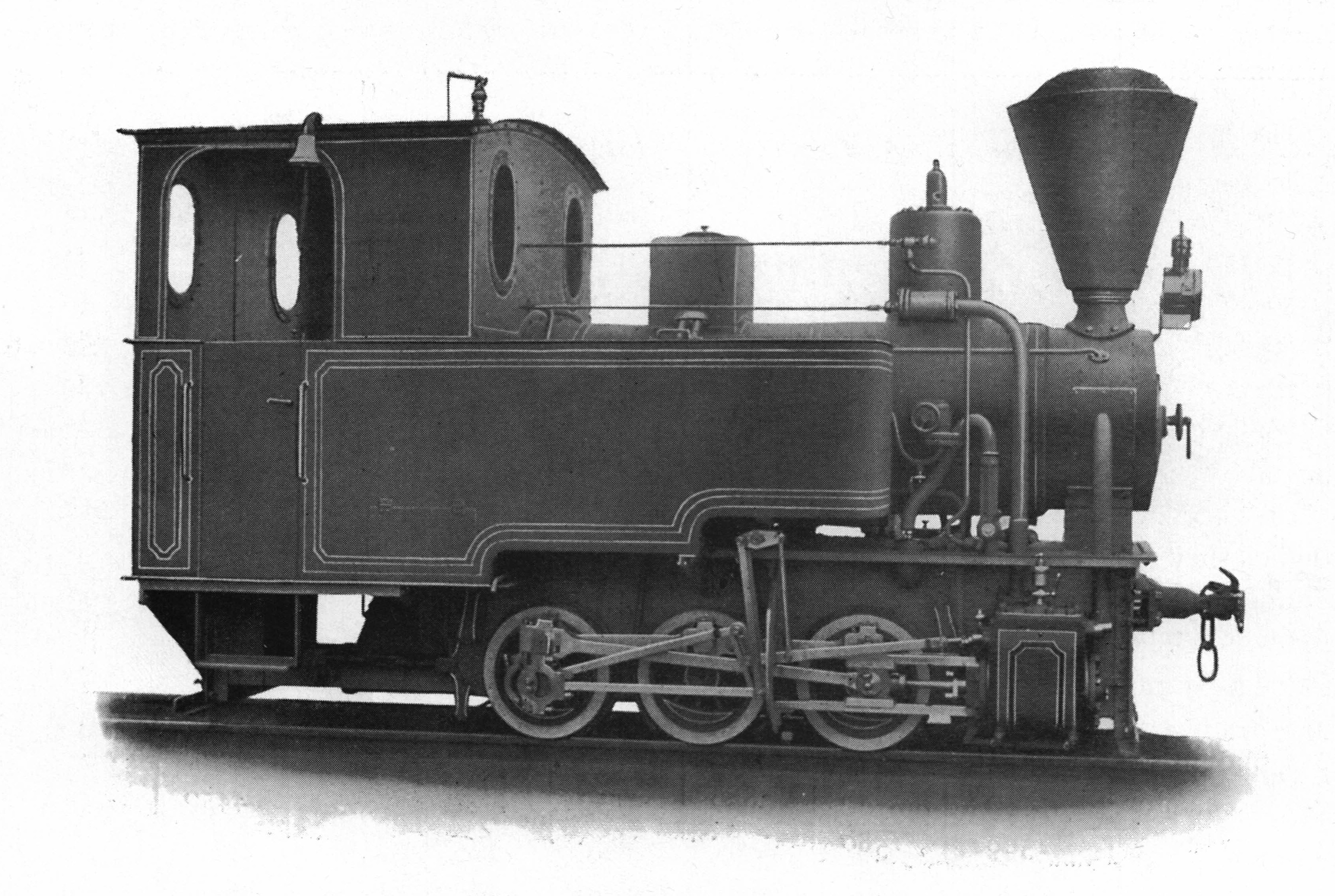
0-6-0, 50 hp, 750 mm, 10.2 t, wood fired

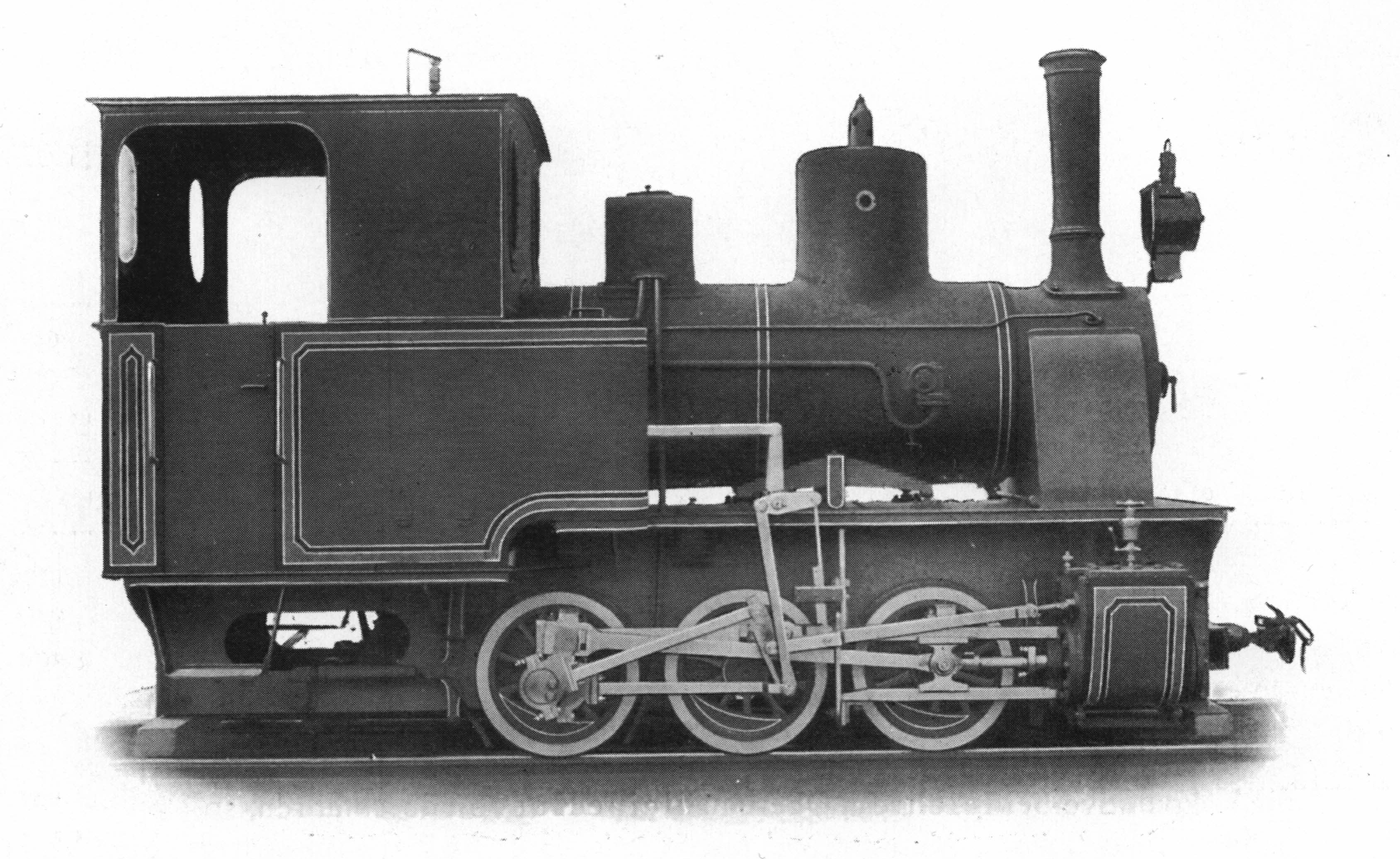
0-6-0, 70 hp, 900 mm, 13.2 t, coal fired

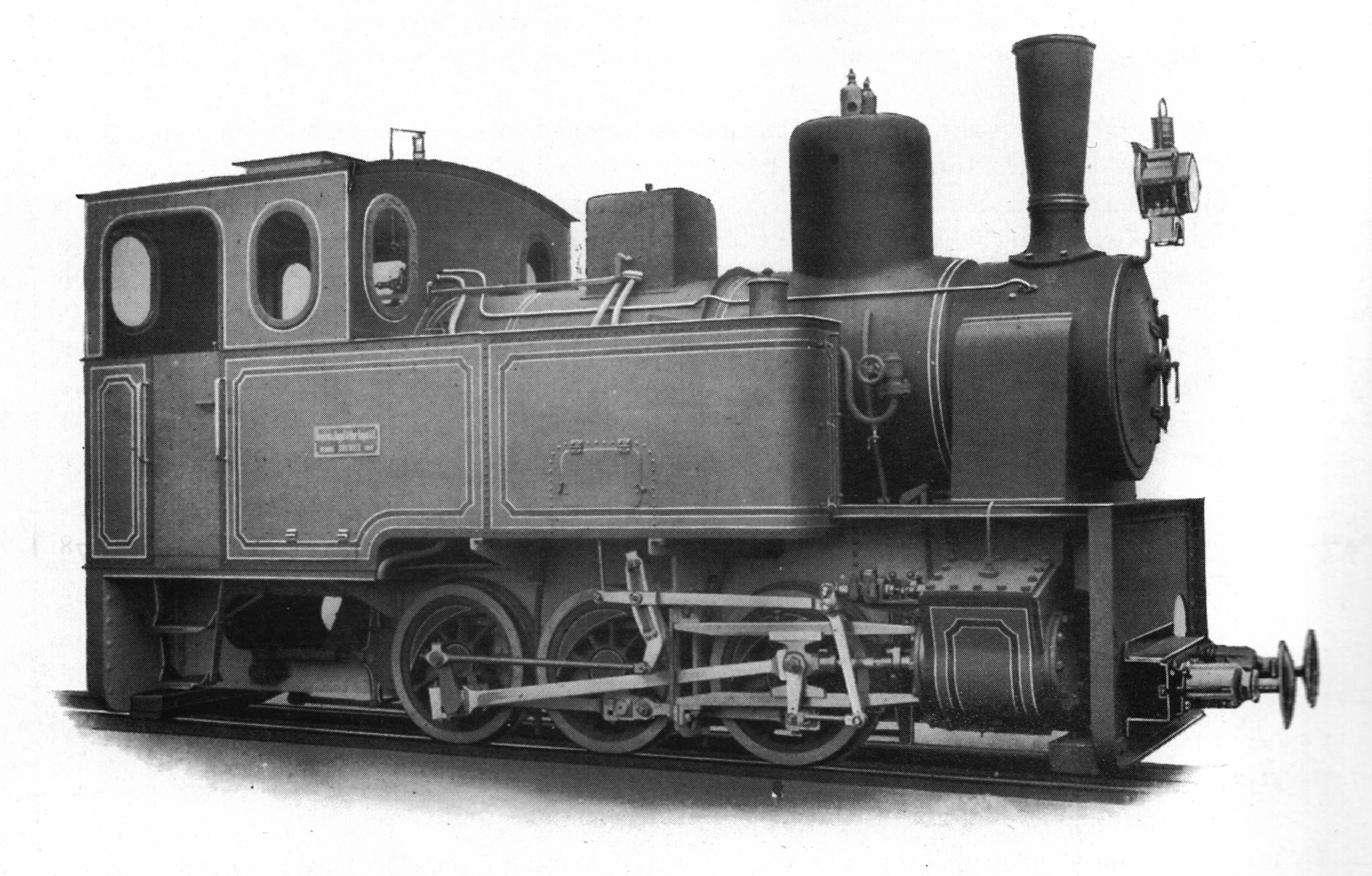
0-6-0, 140 hp, 1000 mm, 19.500 t, coal fired

As with the two-axle coupled locomotives, the full weight of the machines with three coupled axles was used as adhesion weight. However, since the wheel pressure was distributed over six wheels instead of four, locomotives of this category could run on much lighter rails than two-axle locomotives with the same weight and therefore the same tractive force. This type of locomotive could therefore be used wherever the existing track required the most powerful locomotive possible without exceeding the permissible wheel pressure, or where the superstructure was to be constructed relatively lightly. Particularly on longer lines, the latter was considered for the sake of substantial savings. However, the track curves must be larger when using this locomotive than with the four-wheelers.

=== Locomotives with two coupled axles and one svivelling axle (Types 2-4-0 or 0-4-2) ===
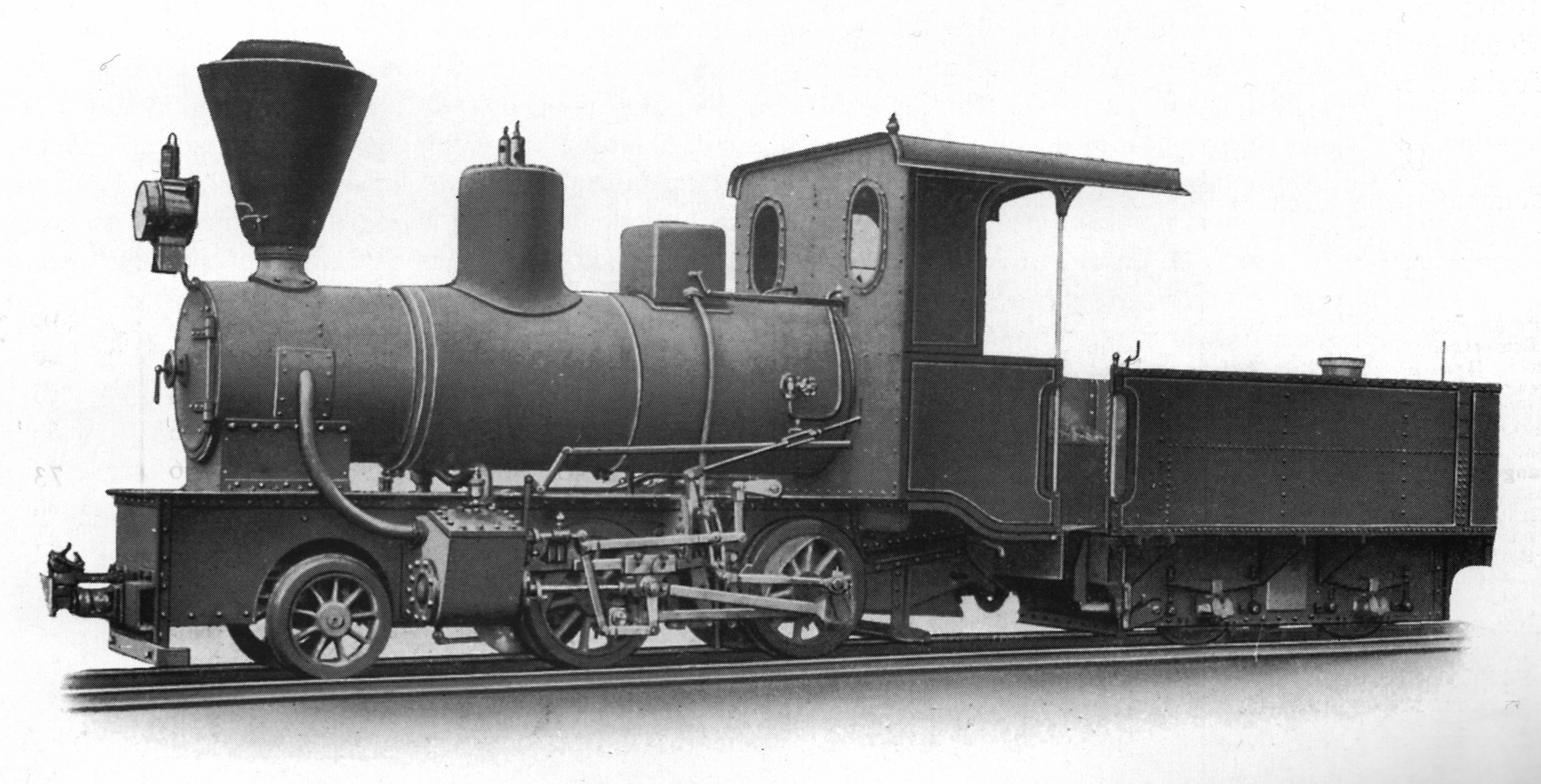
Locomotive with two coupled axles, one front svivelling axle and a separate tender, 50 hp, 750 mm, 9.5 t

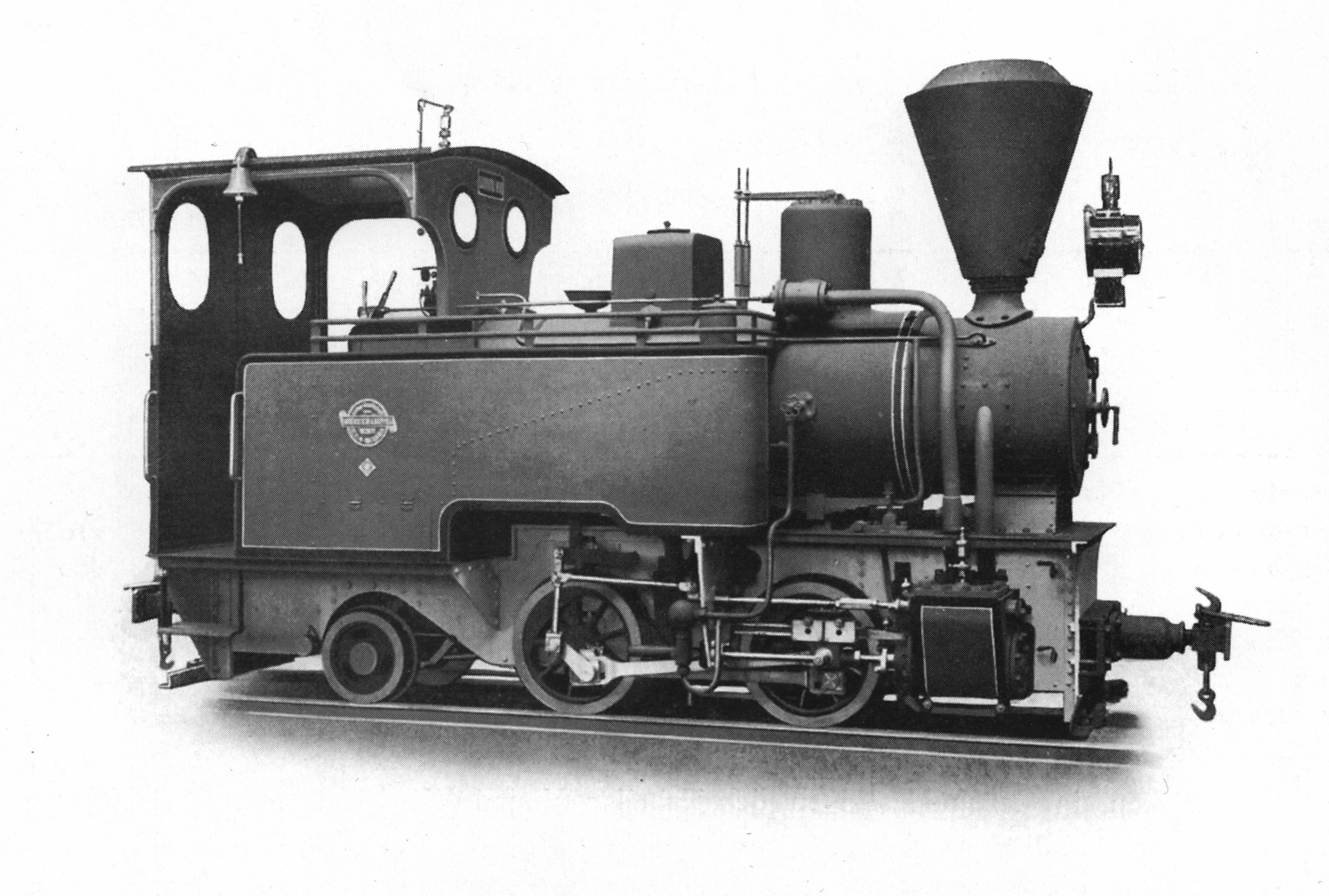
Locomotive with two coupled axles and one rear svivelling axle, 40 hp, 700 mm, 10 t

If the locomotive had to travel through small curves with a light superstructure, it was advisable to purchase a locomotive with two axles and a svivelling axle. This type was especially suitable for longer distances because, it allowed a light superstructure and was also able, to carry larger supplies than 0-4-0 locomotives with the same wheel pressure. The design also had the advantage that the centre of gravity could be set lower than on other types. This, together with the large wheelbase, gave the machines a particularly smooth ride. It could also run at a relatively higher speed, so that, according to the above, it was mainly suitable for small railways and feeder lines. Depending on the particular conditions, O&K installed the svivelling axle at the rear or at the front, but always in such a way that the greatest possible adhesive weight was maintained. Since the full weight of this type of machine could never be used as the adhesive weight, this construction was less suitable for carrying large loads. For such cases OK recommended the use of multi-axle coupled locomotives of the Gölsdorf type or, if small curves were available, to the locomotives of the Mallet or Klien-Lindner type, as shown below.

=== Coupled compound locomotives (Type 0-4-4-0, Mallet design) ===
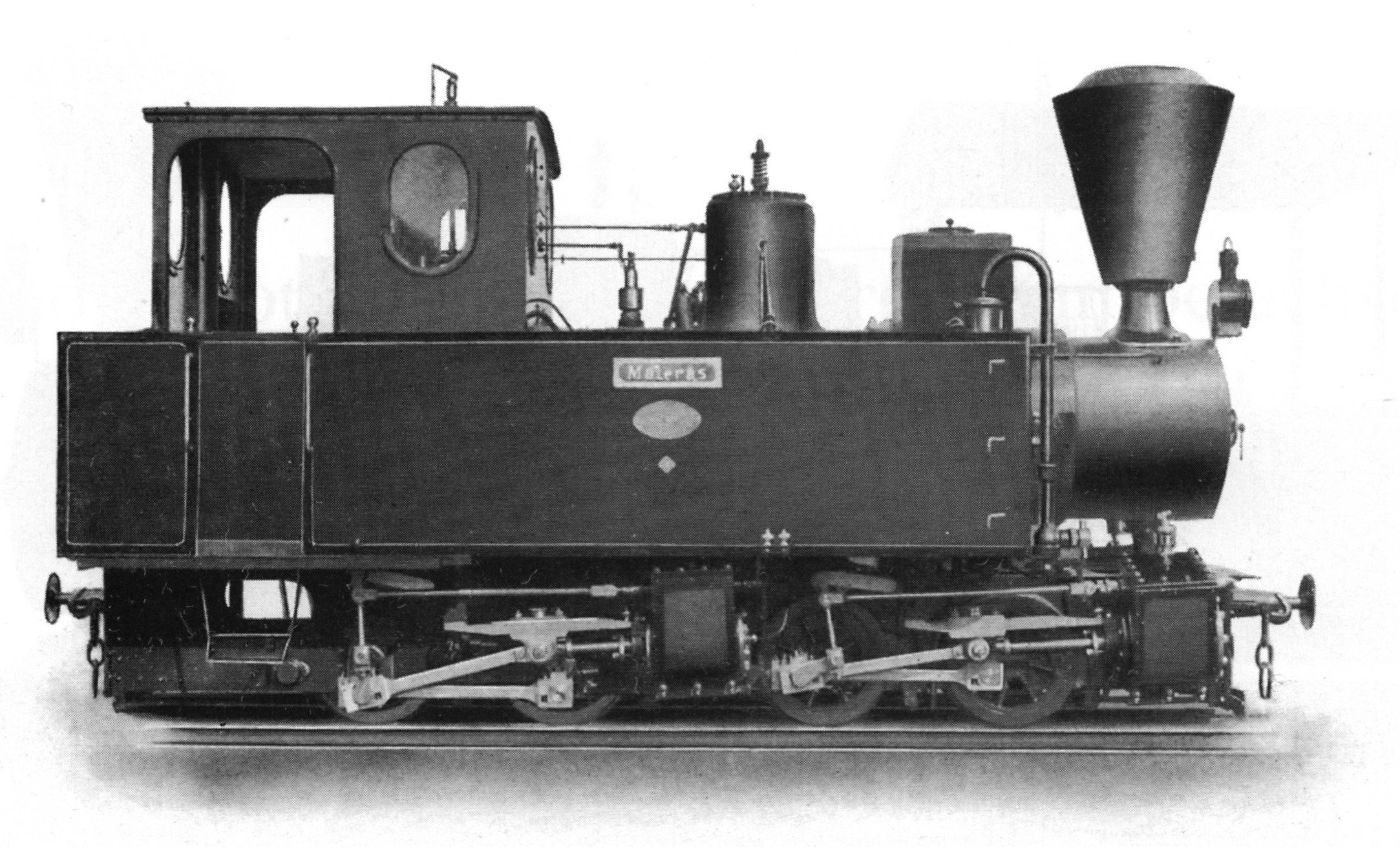
0-4-4-0, 90 hp, 600 mm, 15 t

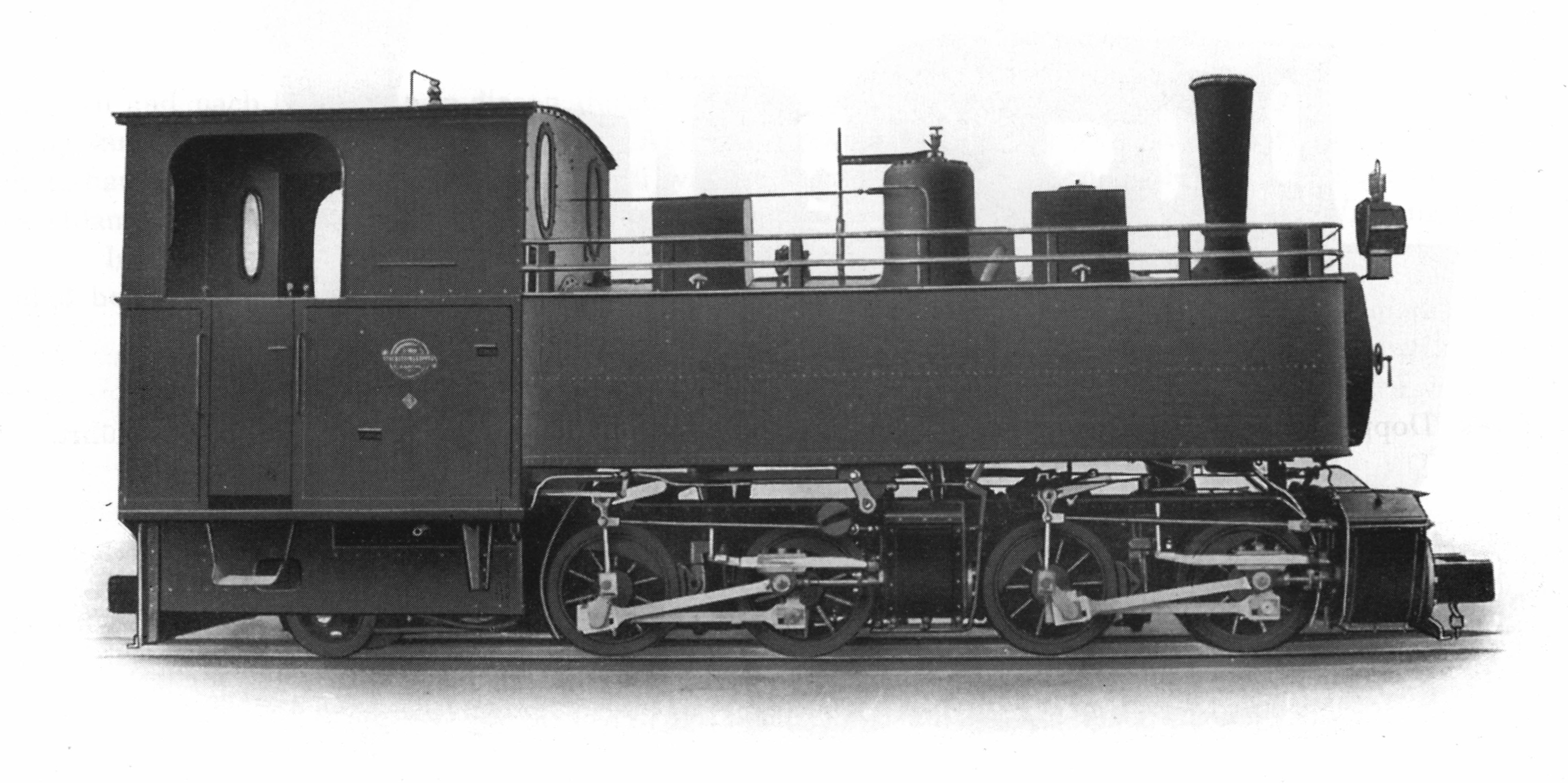
0-4-4-2, 110 hp, 800 mm, 22 t

In many cases, where 0-4-0 or 0-6-0 steam locomotives were no longer sufficient, O&K built 0-4-4-0 or 0-6-6-0 compound locomotives, Mallet design, which supplemented the more conventional looking 0-4-2 locomotives (in Germany categorized as 2×2/2 and 2x3/3 double compound locomotives in comparison to the more conventional looking 2/3 locomotives). Apart from the possibility of being used on light superstructures and small curves, the locomotive had the advantage of great tractive power due to the composite arrangement of the cylinders, as the full weight was used as adhesion weight. The design was such that the boiler, driver's cab and storage boxes were connected to the rear frame, which carried the high-pressure cylinders, while the front frame, on which the low-pressure cylinders were located, was connected to the rear frame by two vertical hinges. The boiler with the water boxes rested on a slide track of the front frame, so that the latter could move freely under the boiler. The steam passed from the regulator in fixed pipes to the high-pressure cylinders and, after expansion in these, through an absolutely steam-tight, flexible, well-insulated pipe to the low-pressure cylinders. The exhaust steam entered the exhauster through a vertical movable pipe. A special valve made it possible to feed boiler steam directly to the low-pressure cylinders, so that all four cylinders came into operation immediately when the locomotive was started-up.

=== Locomotives with coupled hollow axles with radial and lateral movement (Klien-Lindner design) ===
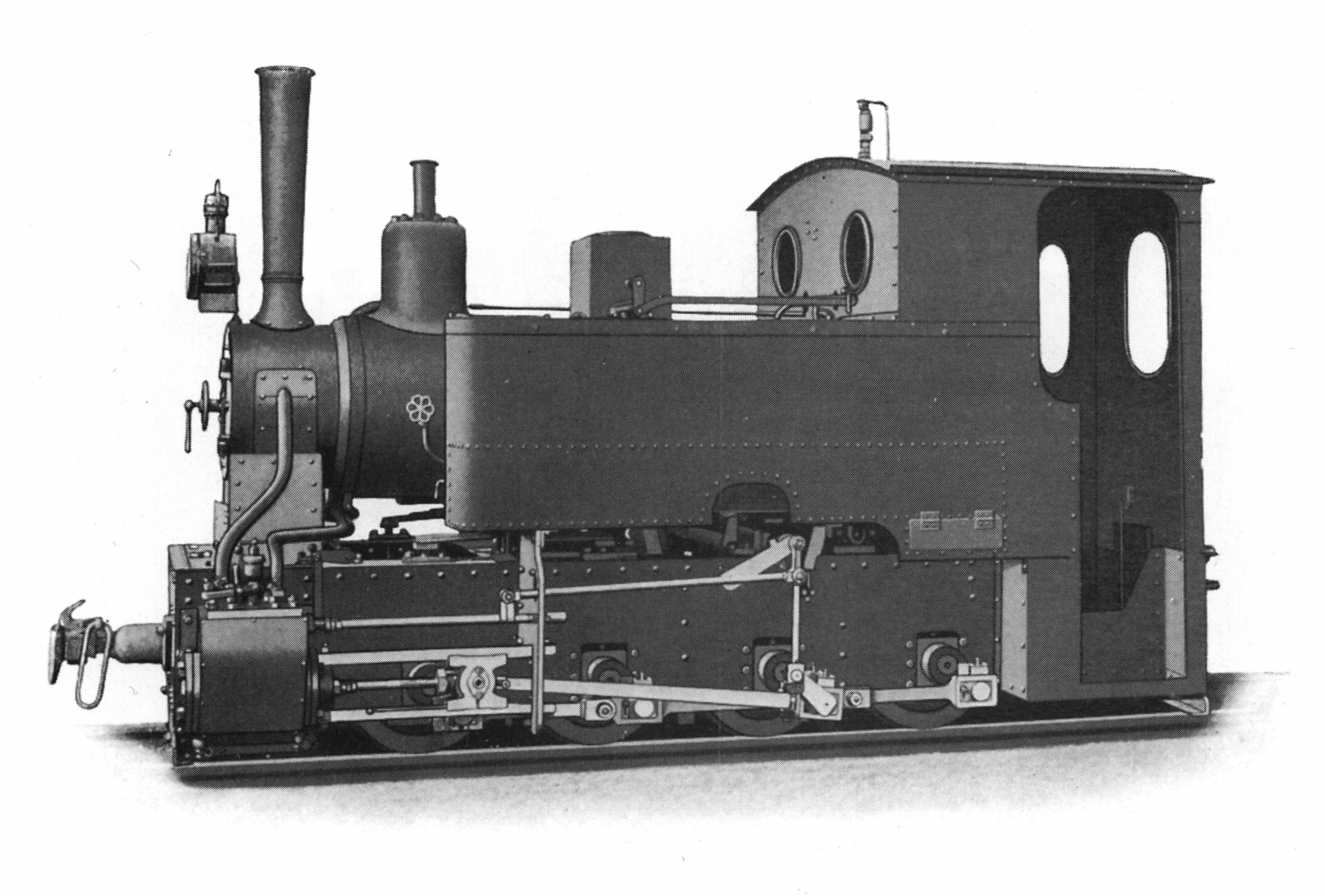
0-8-0, 20 hp, 750 mm

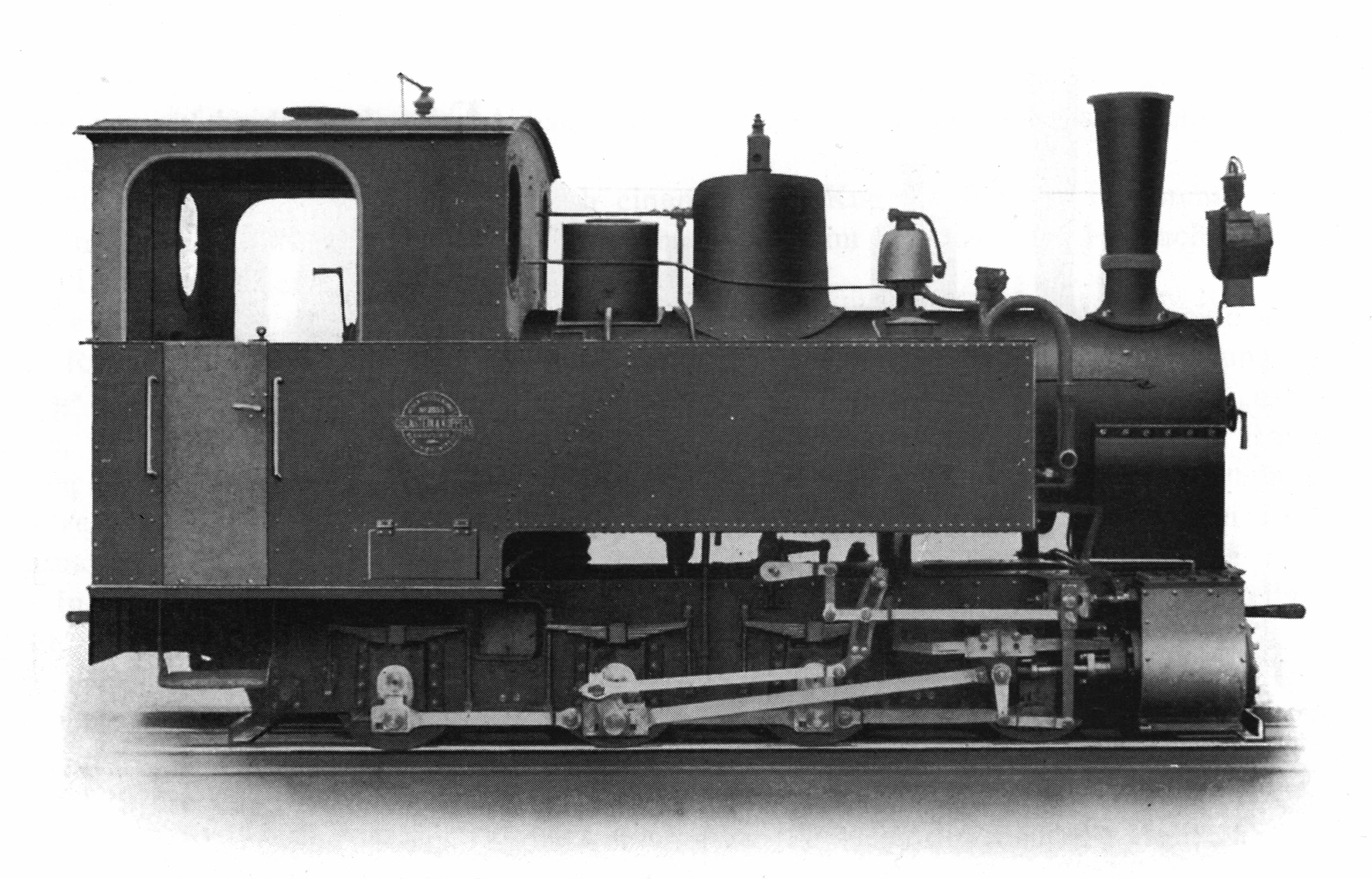
0-8-0, 90 hp, 600 mm

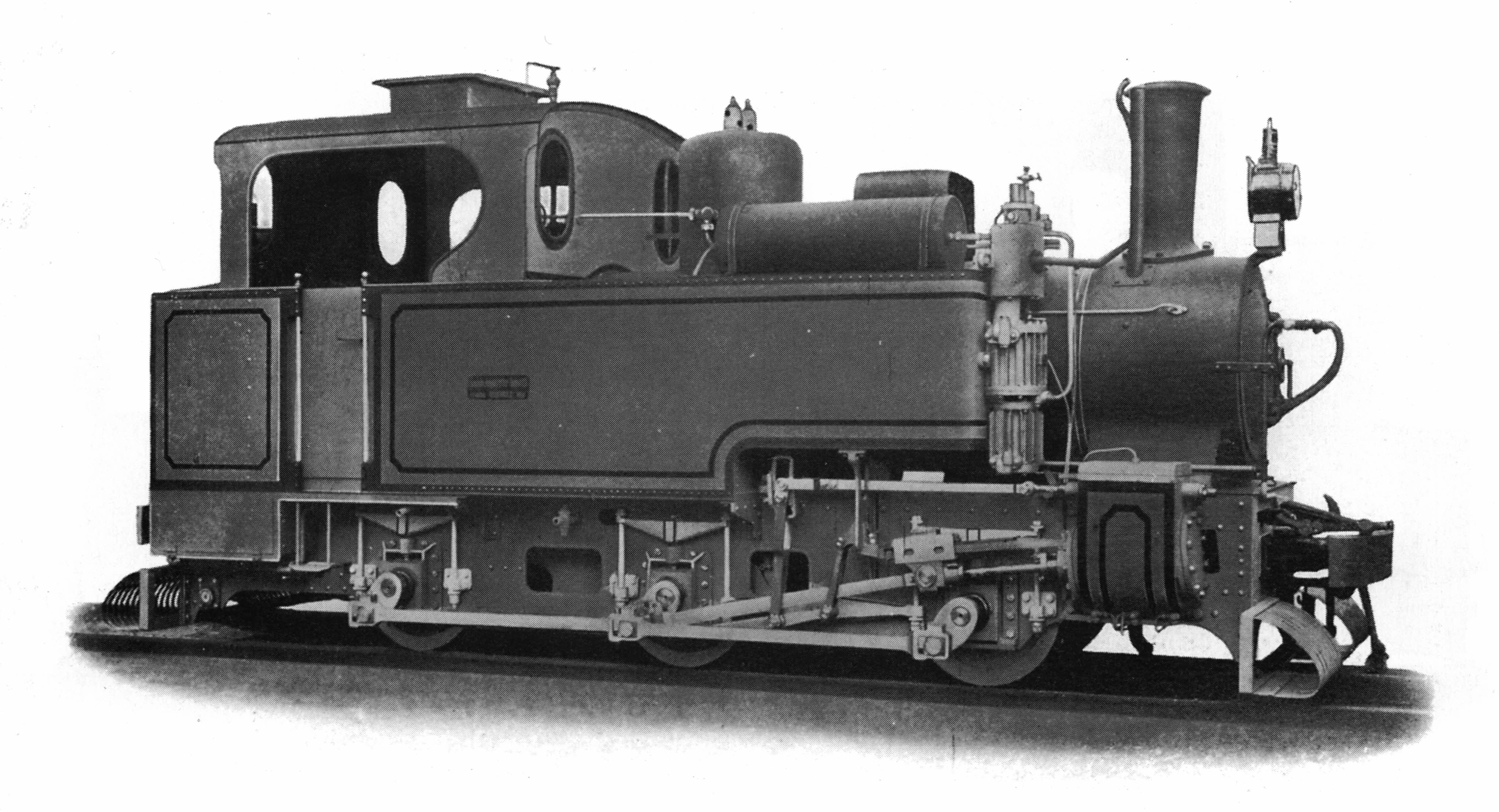
0-6-0, 140 hp, 1000 mm

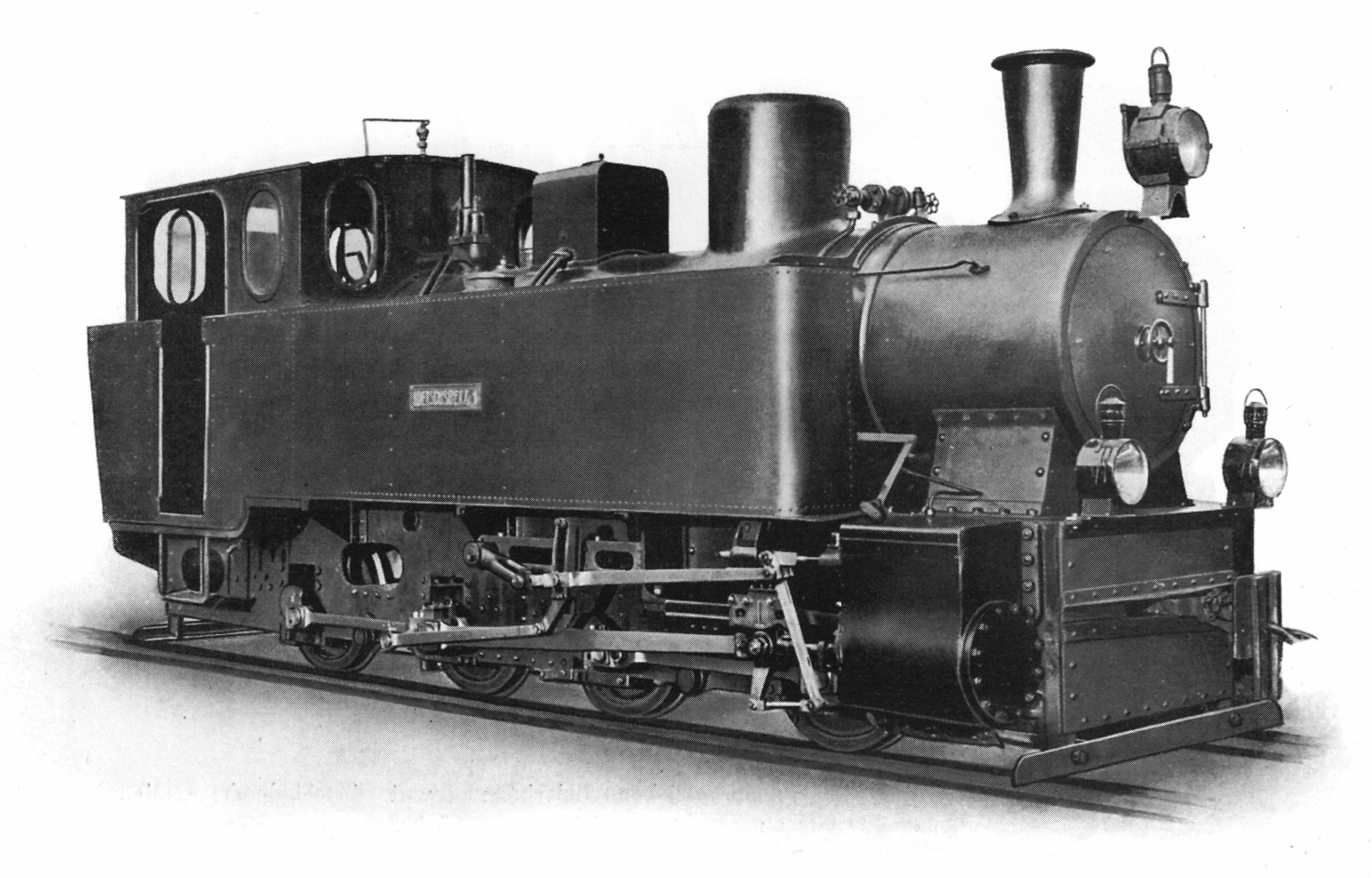
0-8-0, 160 hp, 750 mm

For railways with steep gradients and relatively light track construction, locomotives with two or three coupled axles often did not meet the requirements of increased traffic. Due to the high costs involved, the existing tracks could often not be converted, and heavier locomotives with a larger number of axles were used. Where small curvatures precluded the use of long, fixed wheelbases, locomotives with steerable bogies or, for the sake of simplicity, locomotives with curvilinear coupled axles were often used. The acquisition of such locomotives was also advisable for such new designs where the track systems and bridges were easier and cheaper to build. Since 1901, locomotives with coupled hollow axles have been built in particular according to the Klien-Lindner design, which has proved extremely successful in operation. The advantages of this design were:

1. Large tractive force at a given permissible wheel pressure
2. Large wheelbase with the best curve mobility and equal spring loading on both sides of each end axle and thus safe running of the locomotive
3. Shock-free running into curves, as well as safe return to the centre position when running on straight track
4. Equally good running when driving forwards and backwards
5. Low wear of the rails and wheel tyres

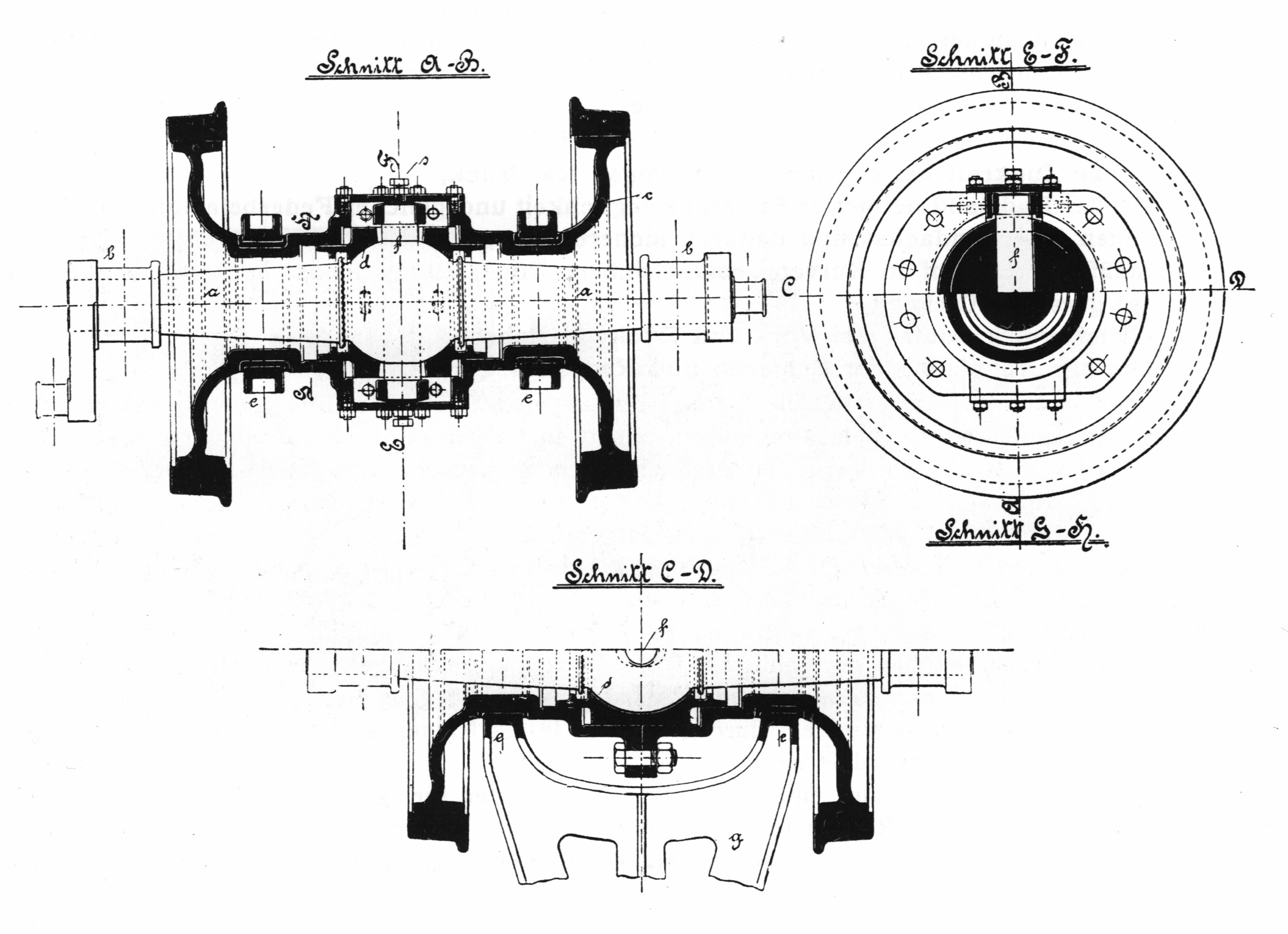
Locomotives with coupled hollow axles with radial and lateral movement (Klien-Lindner design)

The arrangement and mode of operation was as follows: The laterally and radially movable coupled axle was installed as the end axle, and in the case of eight- or ten-wheelers, these steering axles arranged at both ends ensured that the locomotive could enter the curves without difficulty. All axles were coupled in the usual way by fixed rods and mounted in axle bushes "bb" outside the wheels, following the spring play. The axle bushes sit in a continuous, fixed frame on which the steam cylinders are arranged in the usual way. The steering axle consists of a core axle "a" fixed in "bb" and driven in the usual way, and a hollow axle "c" which is firmly connected to the wheels and can be moved laterally and radially and which encloses the core axle, which is provided with a ball attachment in the middle, by means of a two-part ball cup "d".

The load on the axle was distributed by the ball pivot of the core axle "a" as it were by a transverse balancer on both wheels of the axle and thus equal wheel pressures and safety against derailment are obtained. The hollow axle is driven by a driving pin "f" pressed into the ball pivot of the core axle with sliding pieces at both ends, which have the necessary lateral play in the housing of the hollow axle for the deflection of the axle. In order to return the hollow axle to its central position after deflection, either return springs are arranged in the central housing, or, as can be seen in the following illustration, counter-guides "g" are arranged which, by means of brackets, enclose the hollow axles in the auxiliary bearing positions "ee" and effect unconstrained, shock-free adjustment of the hollow axle, since both end axles must execute their radial or lateral movement simultaneously. In order to counteract the unsteady running of the steering axles on the track and any lurching of the locomotive, these locomotives are fitted with an adjustable safety device which holds the drawbar frames in the central position on the track by means of spring tension; no pressure is exerted against the bearing points with this resetting device. These axles do not require any maintenance except for periodic lubrication. The periodic lubrication mentioned is only necessary at intervals of 1 to 2 months and is carried out after loosening the two lubricating screws "s" located on the centre of the axle by introducing grease or viscous oil into the sliding boxes of the driving pin. Only during a general inspection of the locomotives is it necessary to also inspect the hollow axles to make sure that the internal parts are in good condition.

O&K have used the Klien-Lindner axles for the Royal Prussian State Railways and many other railway in large numbers. The administration of the military railway has also introduced 0-8-0 locomotives with steerable coupled axles in place of the 0-6-0 field railway locomotives previously built.

=== Locomotives with laterally movable coupled axles (Gölsdorf design) ===
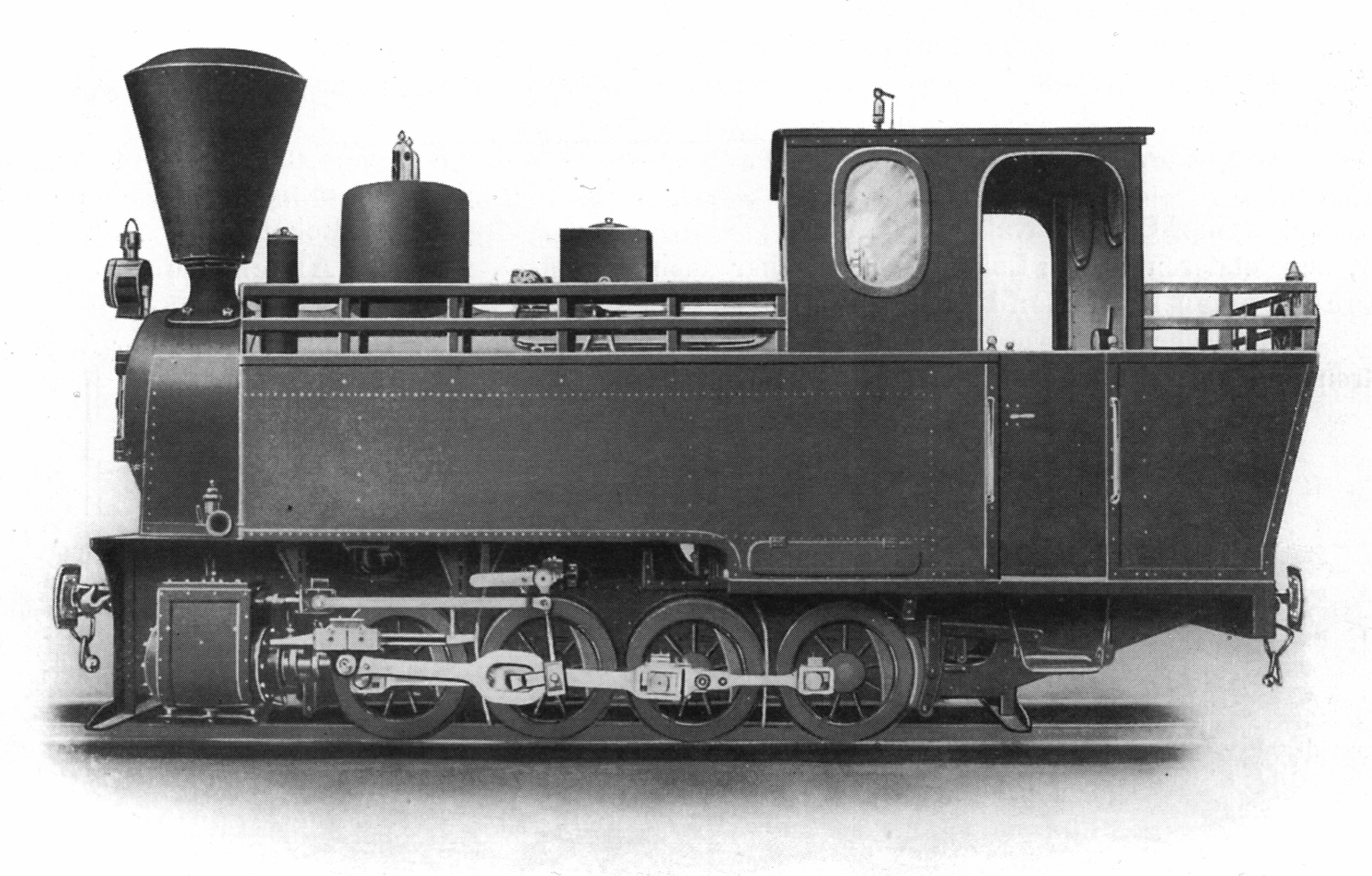
0-8-0 locomotive with laterally movable Gölsdorf axles, 60 hp, 750 mm (2 ft 5 1/2 in), weight 14 t

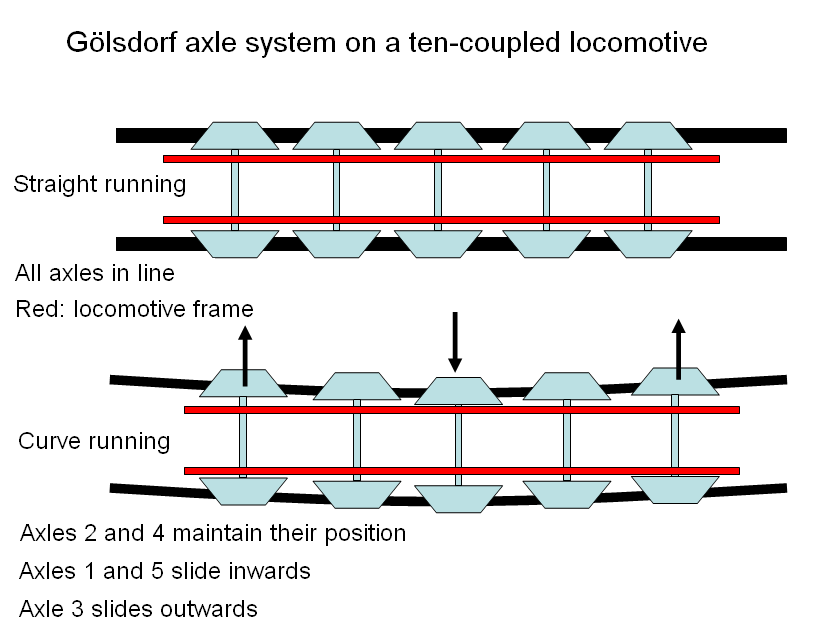
Principle of the Gölsdorf axles shown on a ten-coupled steam engine

Locomotives of the Gölsdorf design were only suitable for lines, on which there were relatively few and large curvatures. In this case it was sufficient to shift one or more coupling axles sideways in such a way that the movable axles were not guided in their axle bearings but by their own flanges. The bearings of the coupling rods have the same lateral play on their journals as the axles in the axle bearings. This type of construction has proven itself well on eight- and multi-wheel locomotives, but it was not suitable for very small curvatures. In terms of performance and even load distribution, etc., it was equivalent to the more common Klien-Lindner locomotives. They were used for main, branch and small railways.

Two of the five axles of a ten-wheel locomotive could move sideways relative to the frame because their axle boxes fixed them rigidly to the frame. The other axles, however, were fitted into their bearings and attached to their drives in such a way that they can be moved sideways during curve running, depending on the sideways forces acting on them. In addition the connecting and coupling rods, through which linear forces from the steam pistons were translated into the rotation of the wheels via the crank pins, also had to be able to move sideways.

=== Tramway locomotives (Type 0-4-0) ===
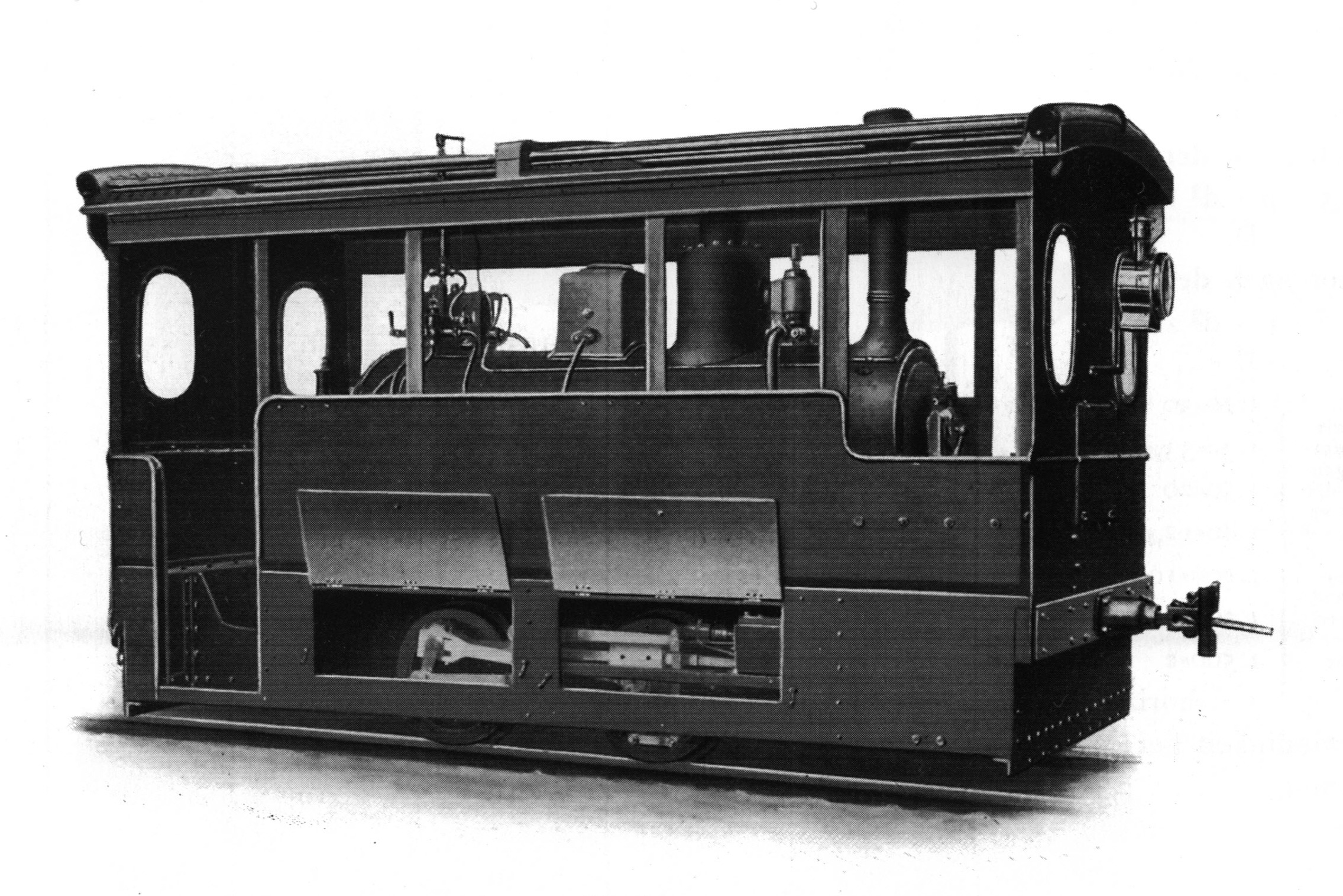
An early oil fired locomotive, possibly O&K 2900/1908, 20 hp, 1,000 mm (3 ft 3 3/8 in), 0-4-0, 7.7 t, often listed as coal fired

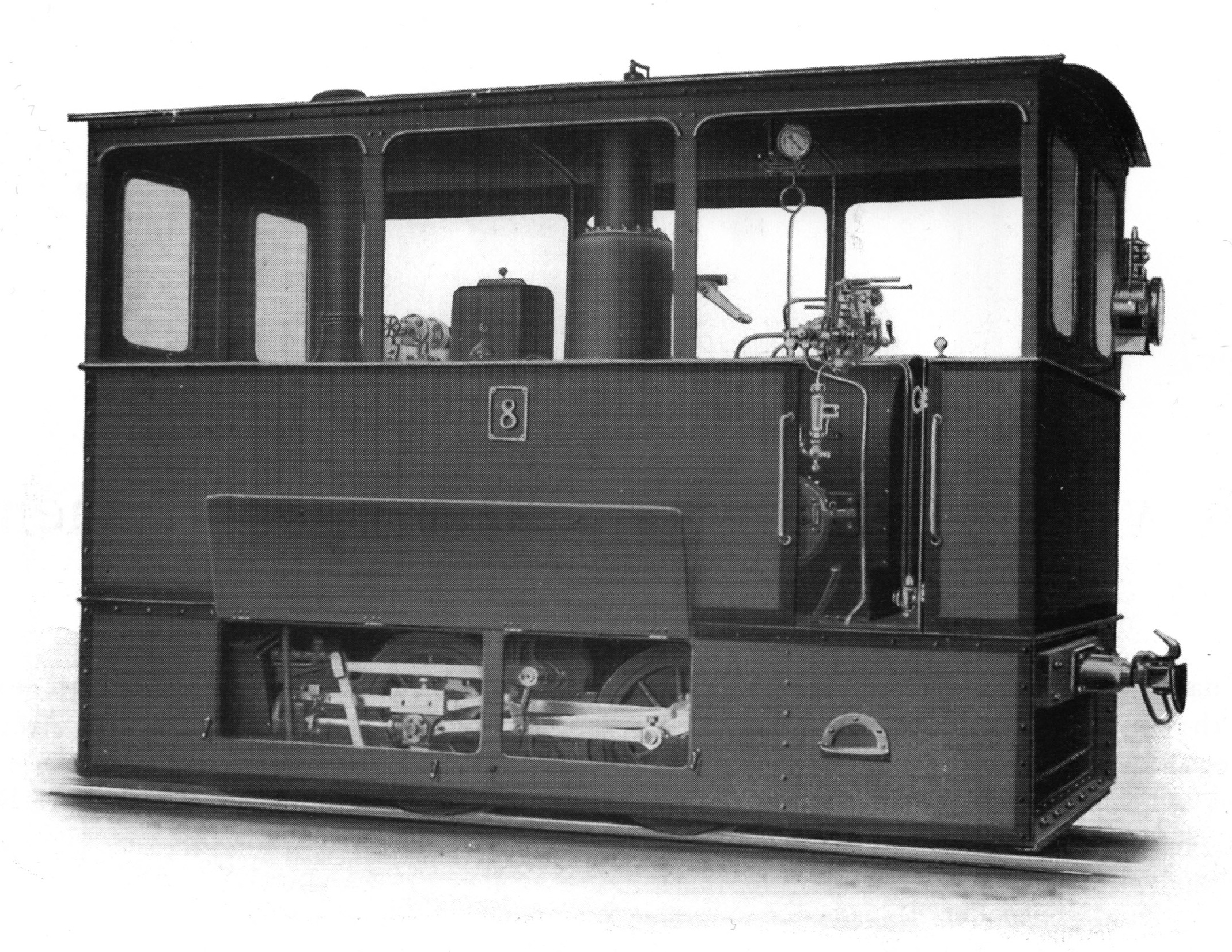
O&K tramway locomotive, 30 hp, 1,000 mm (3 ft 3 3/8 in),, 0-4-0, service weight ca 8.75 t

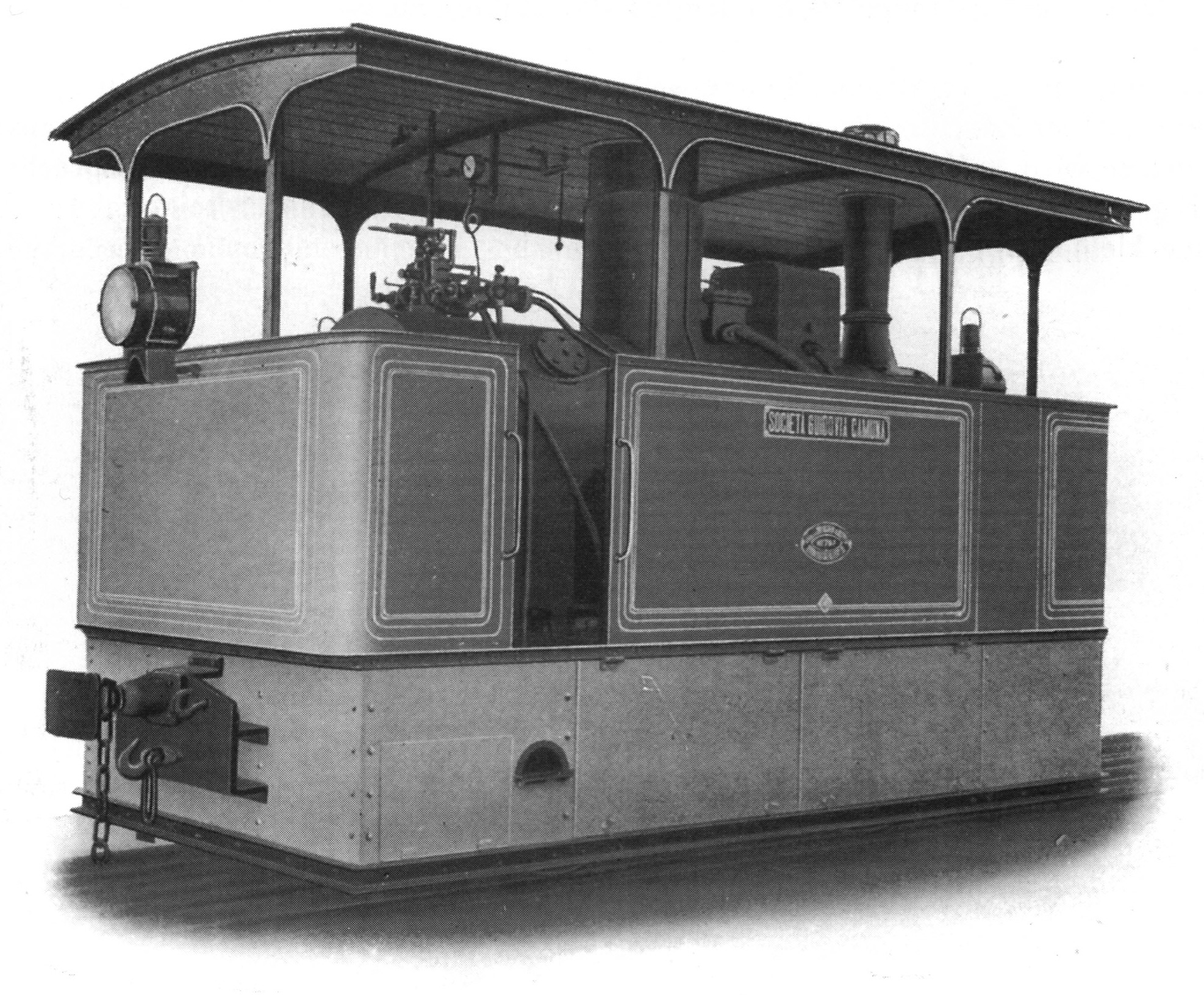
O&K 797/1901 of Societa Guidovia Camuna, 50 hp, 1,000 mm (3 ft 3 3/8 in),, 13 t

O&K built tramway locomotives, which were used for operation on tramways serving public traffic, either with a driver's cab at the front and rear or with only one driver's cab in the middle of the locomotive; furthermore with a power unit cover in two different designs. Whereas one version only served to conceal the engine from road traffic, the other version served to protect the engine parts against dust. The desired type of covering is to be specified. The weight of this locomotive was relatively high and therefore it could develop a great performance immediately when starting up, even on short gradients. This was effectively supported by a high steam overpressure, which O&K usually provided for these locomotives with 14 bars (200 psi).

The fairing of all moving parts was intended to protect other road users such as pedestrians from serious injuries in case of accidents. It also prevented horses from shying and protected the transmission from dirt and dust on the unpaved roads that were common at the time. Often there was no stoker on tram locomotives, which meant they were operated by the driver in one-man operation. The short axle stands also ensured that narrow curves could be negotiated in city centres. Often, standing boilers were used for reasons of space.

=== Mining and tunnel locomotives ===
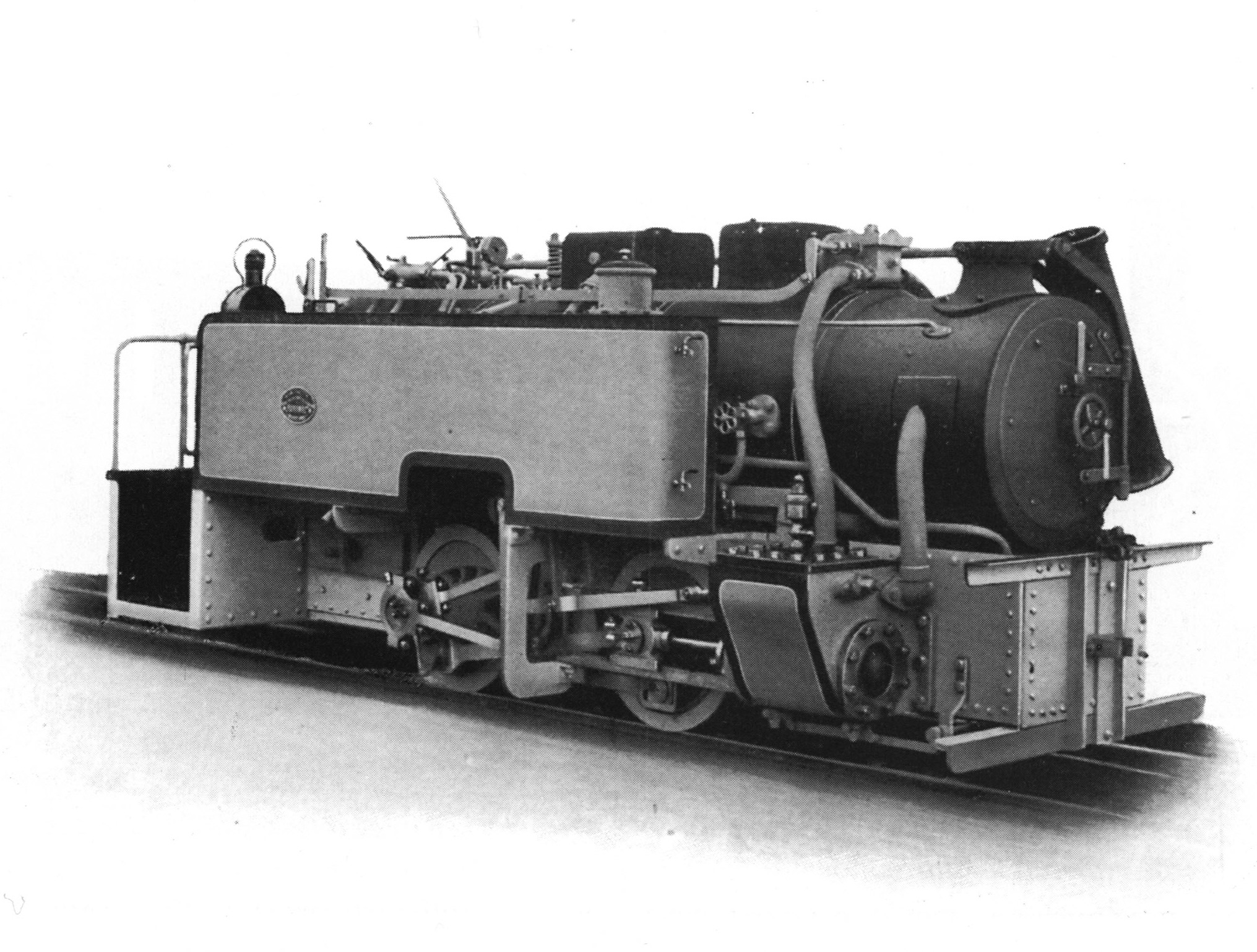
40 hp, 600 mm

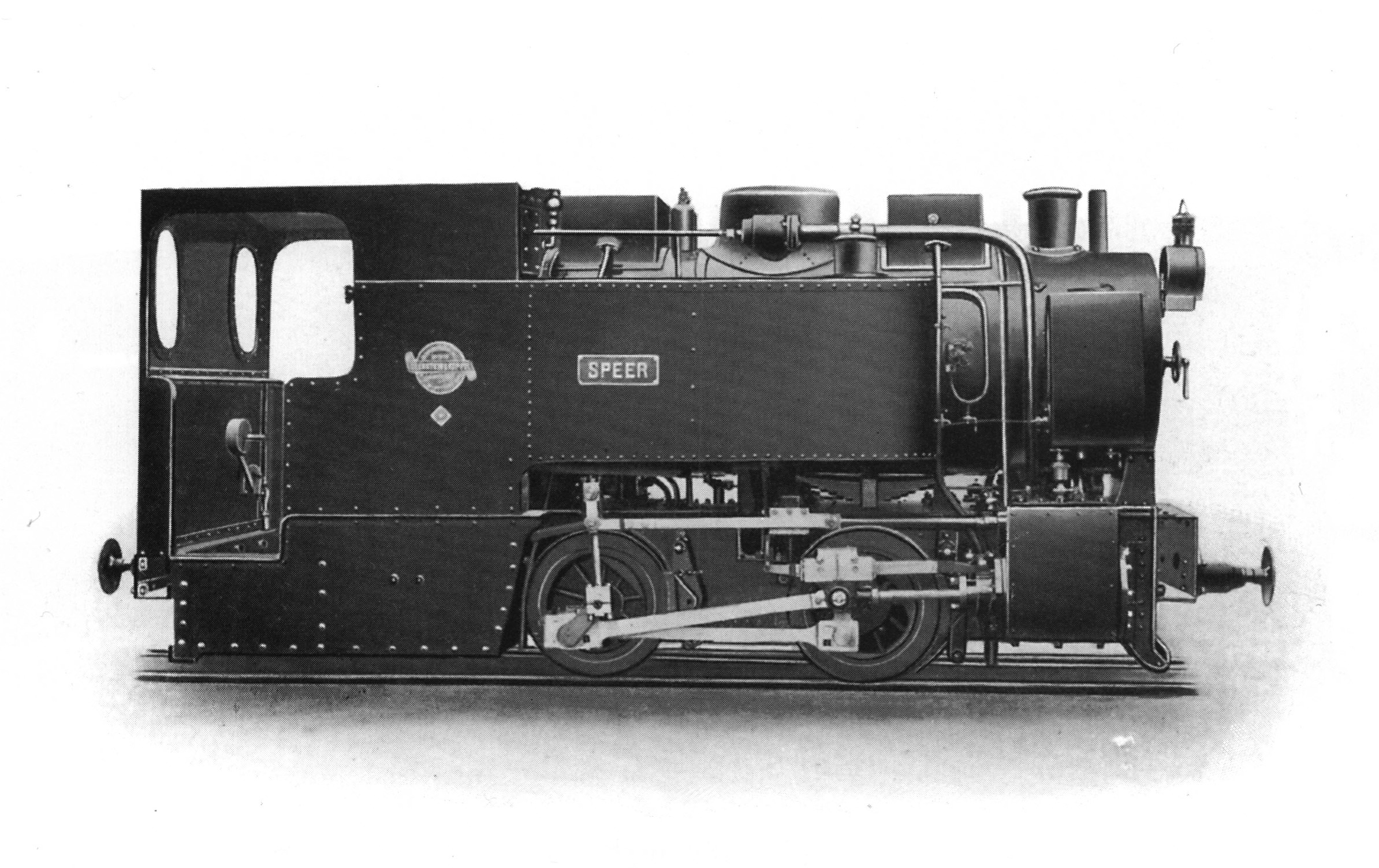
70 hp, 600-750 mm

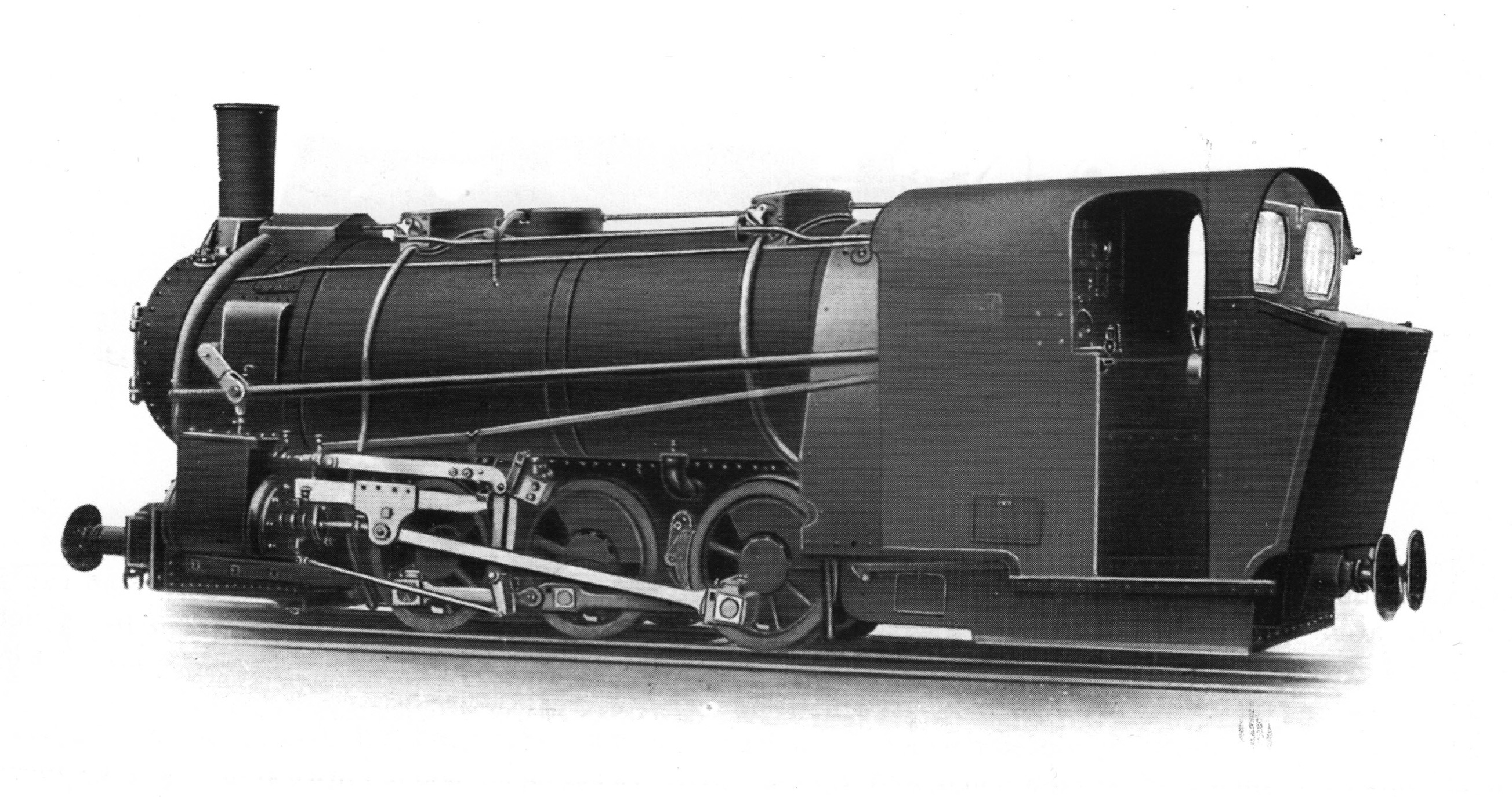
With retractable chimney

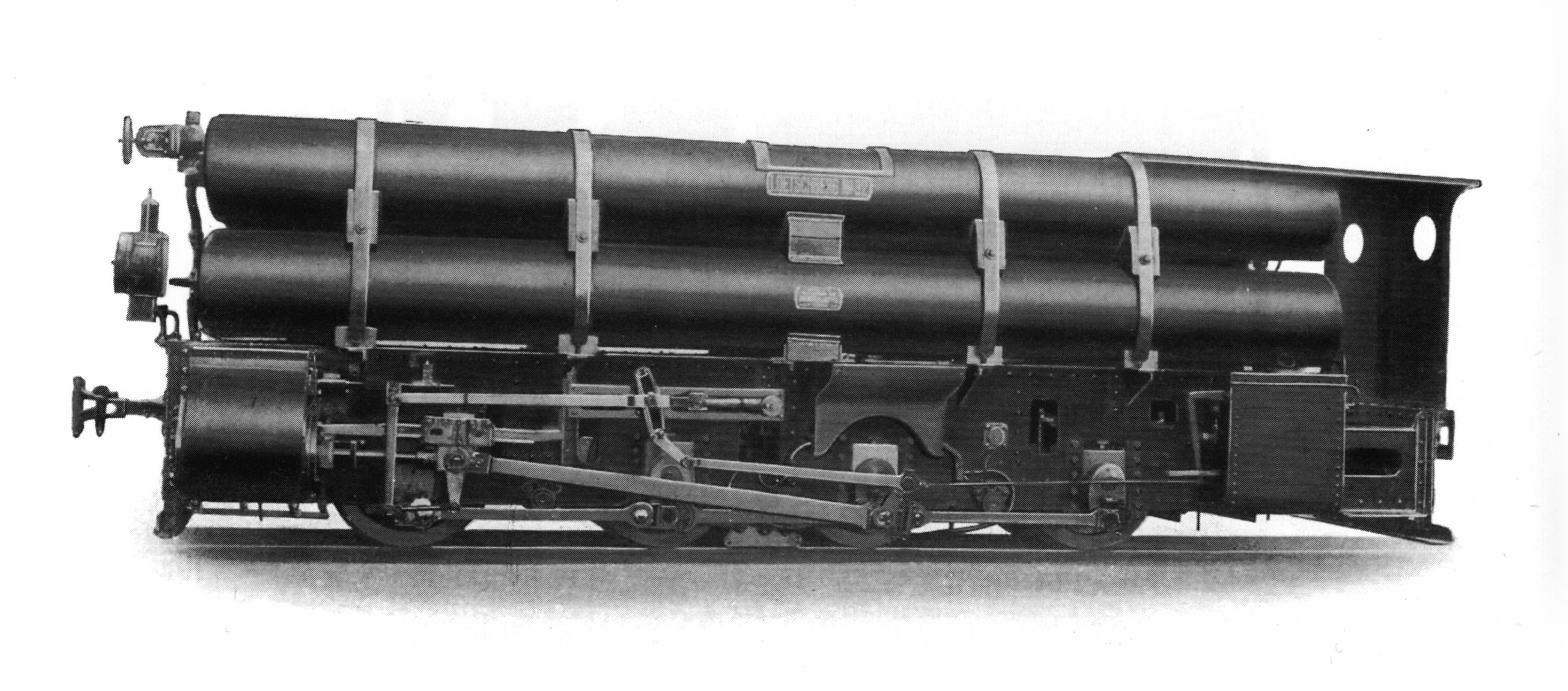
Compressed air locomotive

For operation in tunnels or mine, O&K built locomotives in compliance with specific profiles. In the case of steam locomotives, it was possible to run them at high speed by fitting suitable devices and using particularly large boilers that could store a larger quantity of steam before passing through the tunnel. For use during tunnel construction or in underground mines, steam locomotives with oil firing equipment were particularly suitable, whereby smoke development and spark emission did not take place. The handling of these locomotives did not differ in any other respect from that of an ordinary locomotive. Furthermore, fireless locomotives were also very suitable for operation in tunnels and mines, as they completely avoid the nuisance of smoke, gases and sparks. Compressed air locomotives, which, however, required a special stationary system to generate the compressed air were also made and sold in smaller numbers.

=== Fireless locomotives ===
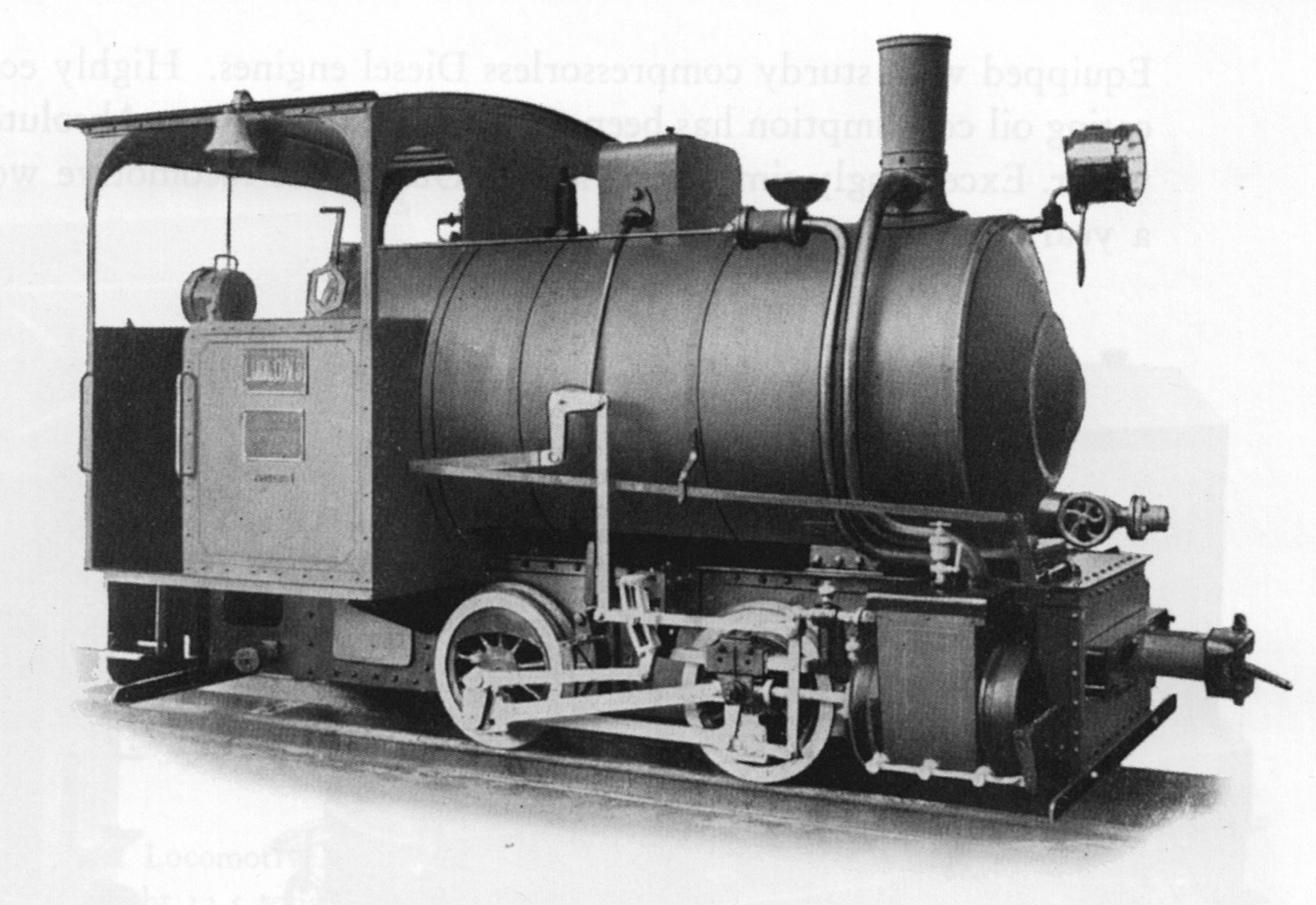
Four-wheel fireless locomotive, empty 8 t, built to any gauge

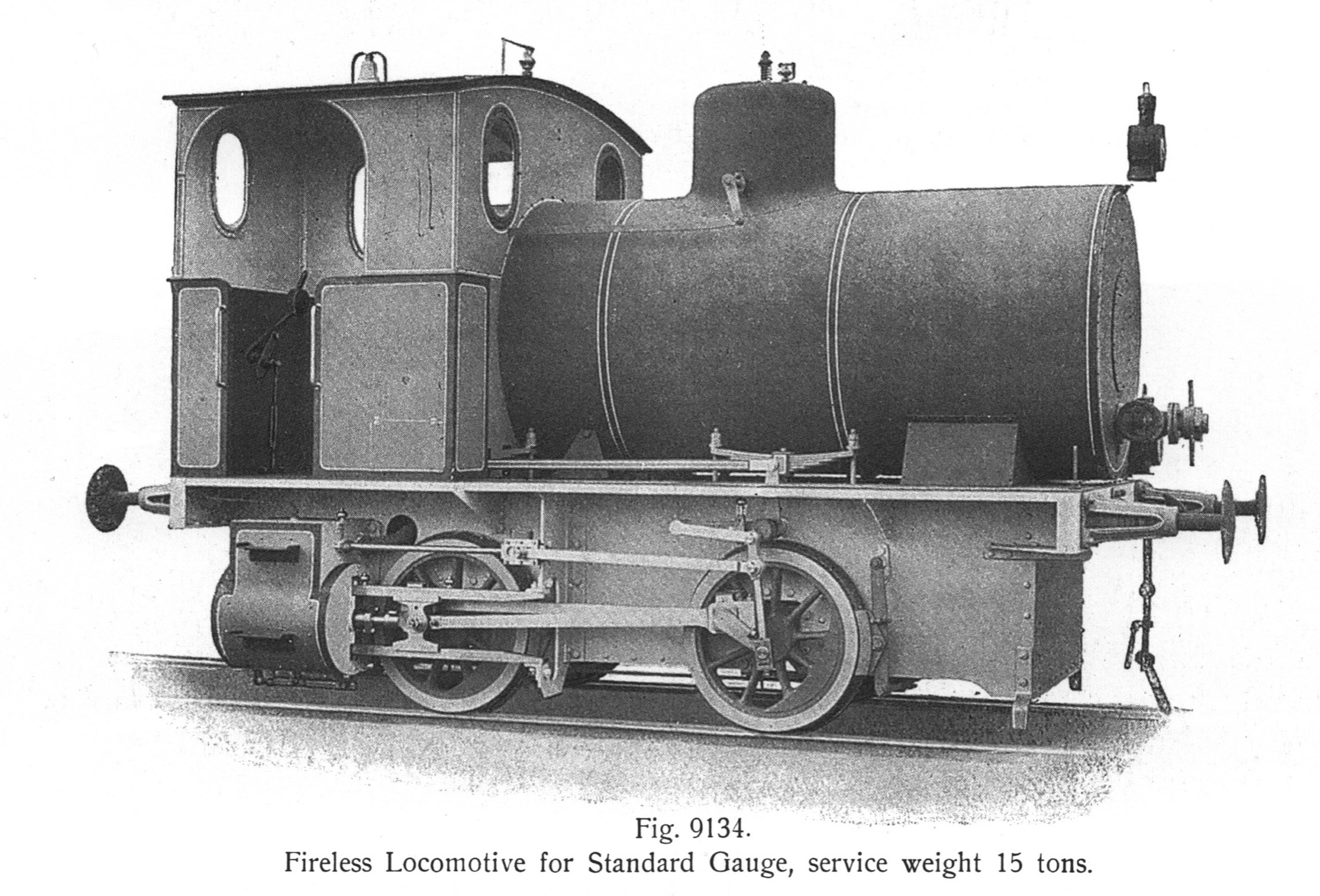
Fireless locomotive for standard gauge, service weight 15 tons

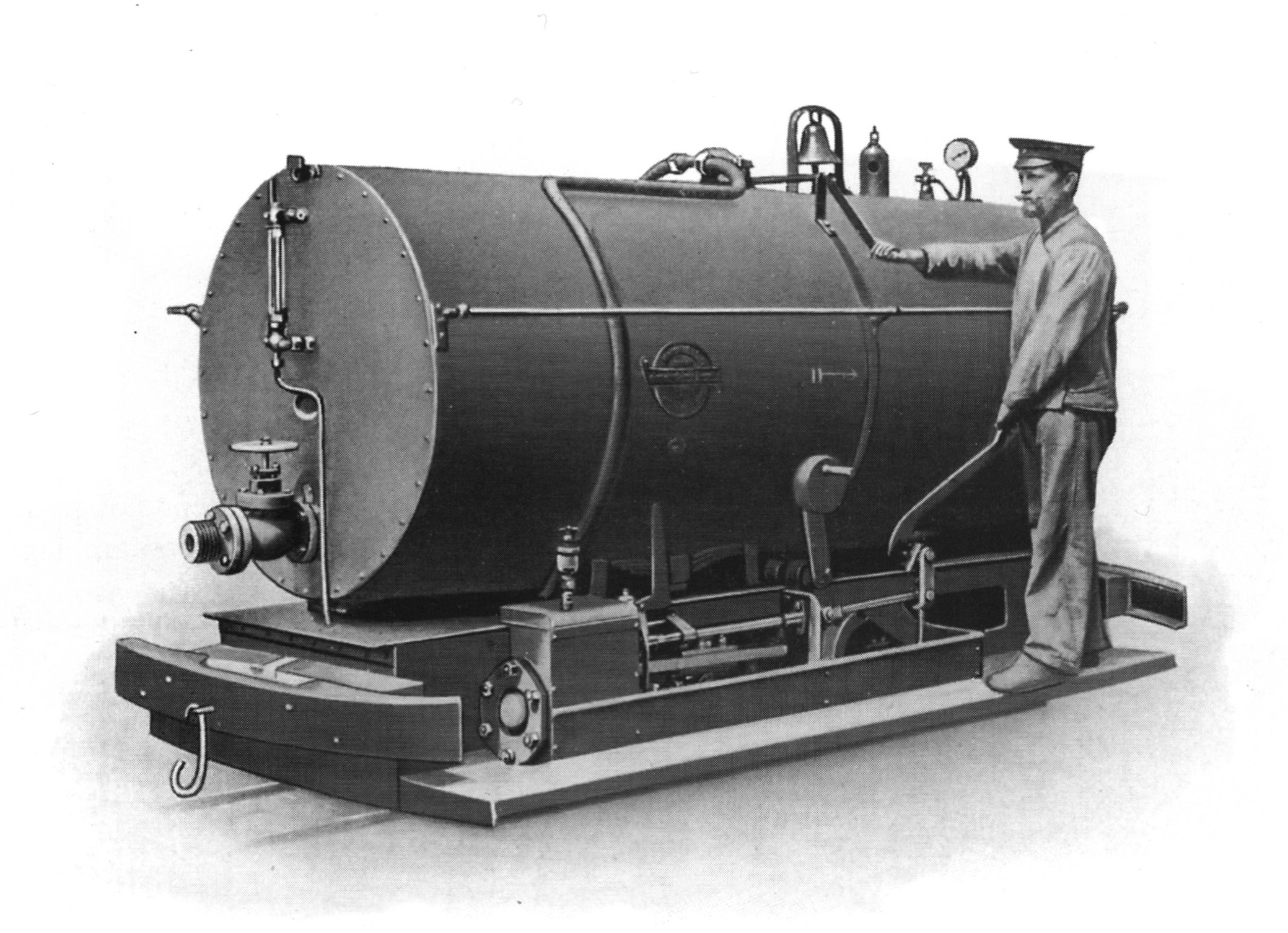
Fireless locomotive for 600 mm (1 ft 11 5/8 in) or 2 ft (610 mm) gauge, service weight 4.8 tons

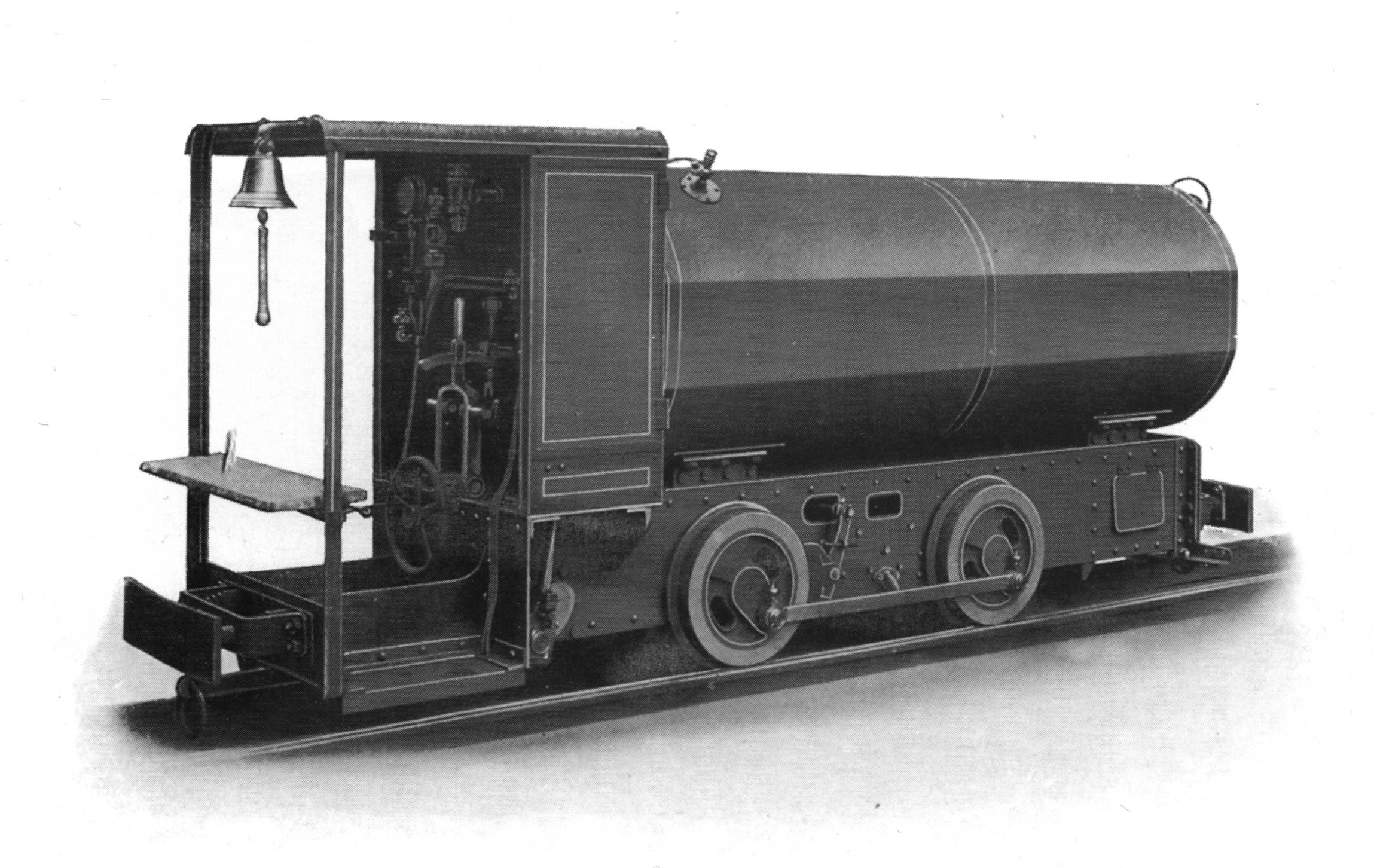
Fireless locomotive for mines, 500 mm (19 3/4 in) gauge, weight 3.9 tons

Fireless locomotives were particularly suitable for use inside factories, yards etc., where it was essential to secure absolute freedom from any risk of fire. They were largely used for shunting purposes for paper mills, oil mills, wool mills, timber yards, gunpowder factories and similar works. These locomotives were constructed without fire boxes, the necessary steam being taken from a stationary boiler. The locomotive is able to work for several hours with one filling and can be operated with minimum expense as the driver needed less skills than that of a conventional steam engine.

=== Rack locomotives ===
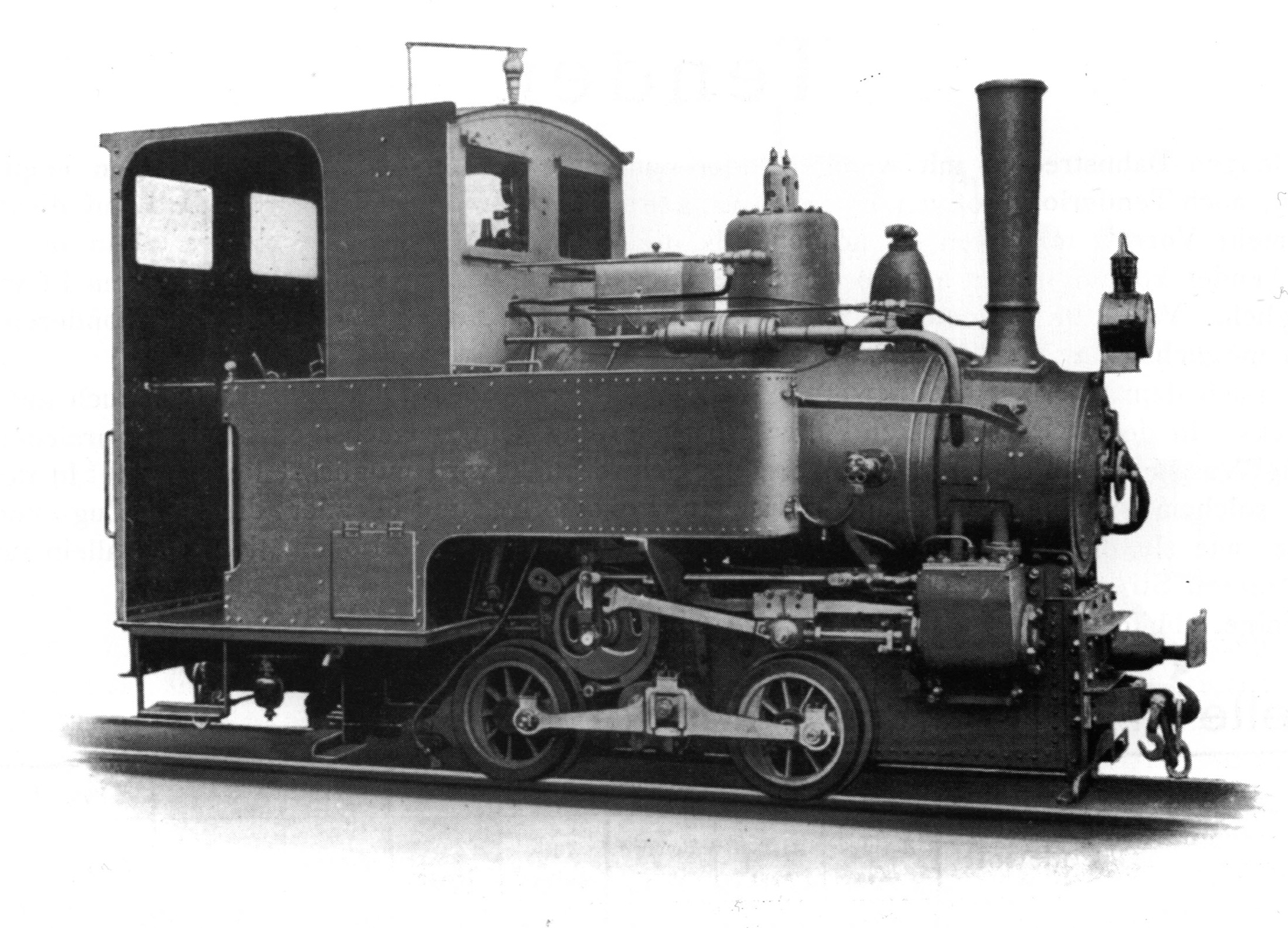
O&K 7000/1914, 30 hp, 600 mm (1 ft 11 5/8 in) gauge, 0-4-0T, Société Chiron Frères, Chambéry for adhesion and rack operation

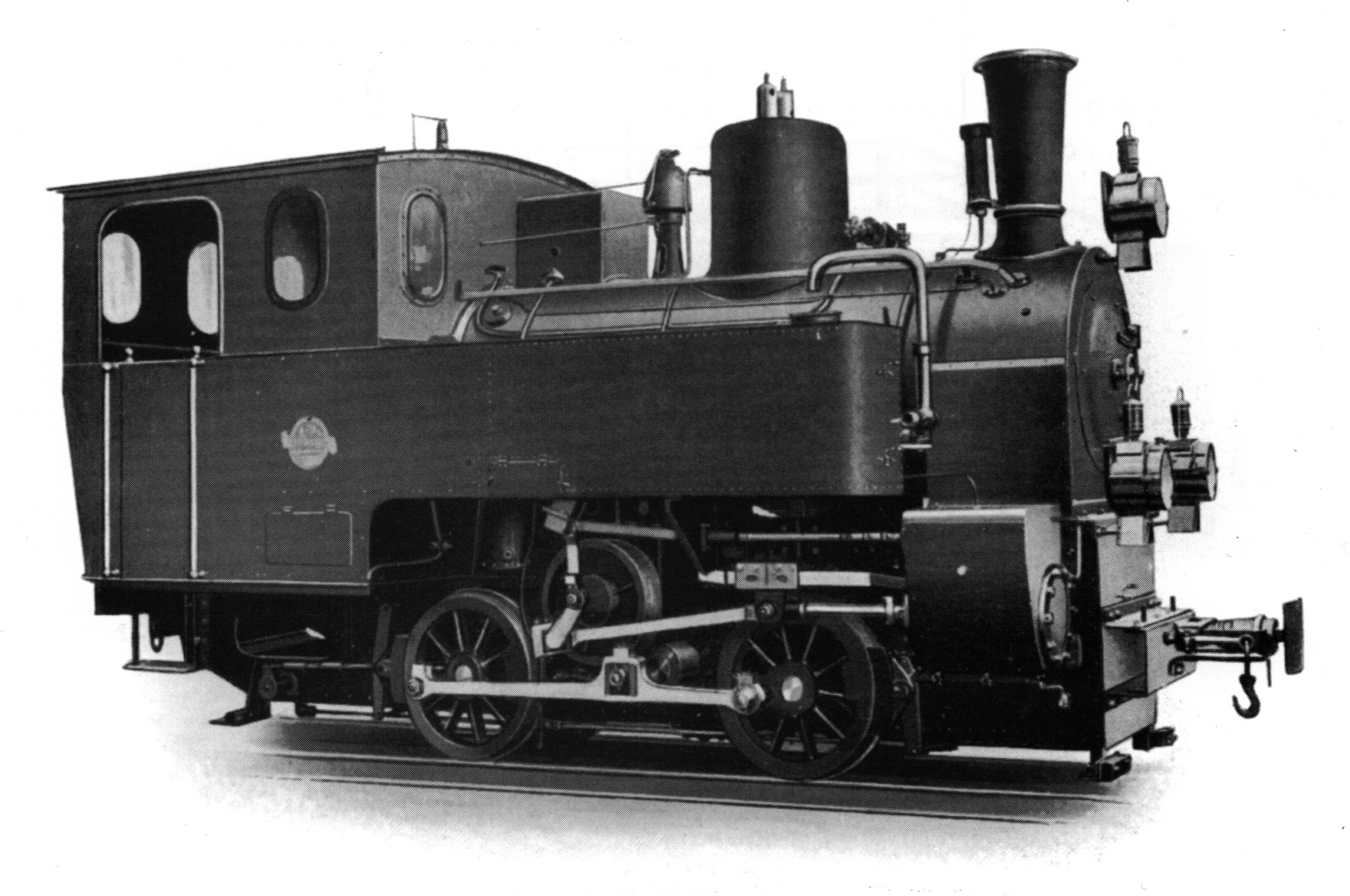
O&K 2365/1907, 125 hp, 850 mm (2 ft 9 15/32 in), 0-4-0T, Gewerkschaft Vereinigte Burgholzhausen, Herdorf (Kunsterthalbahn)

O&K delivered several types of cogwheel locomotives for mixed railways, on which ordinary operation alternated with cogwheel operation. Mixed railways were used in changing terrains with only single steep gradient, which could not be negotiated by ordinary adhesion locomotives. Accordingly, only these steep gradients were equipped with toothed bars. The mode of operation was as follows: The two steam cylinders outside the frame drove the driving gearwheel for the rack by means of a double gearing with the appropriate transmission. This driving gear wheel sat on a special axle fixed in the frame and was connected to the friction axles by coupling rods, so that the gear wheel axle and friction axles were driven simultaneously. The locomotives could therefore run on normal rail tracks as well as on toothed tracks. On the toothed track, the driving gear and the friction wheels worked together. The effect of the latter was also utilised on the toothed track and the load on the rack was relieved accordingly. The locomotives worked either on a simple flat steel rack or on Riggenbach ladder rack. A cumulative number of only 6 to 9 rack steam locomotives were made by O&K in total. Their track gauge ranged from 400 mm (15 3/4 in) to 1,300 mm (4 ft 3 3/16 in).

=== Locomotives with a separate tender ===
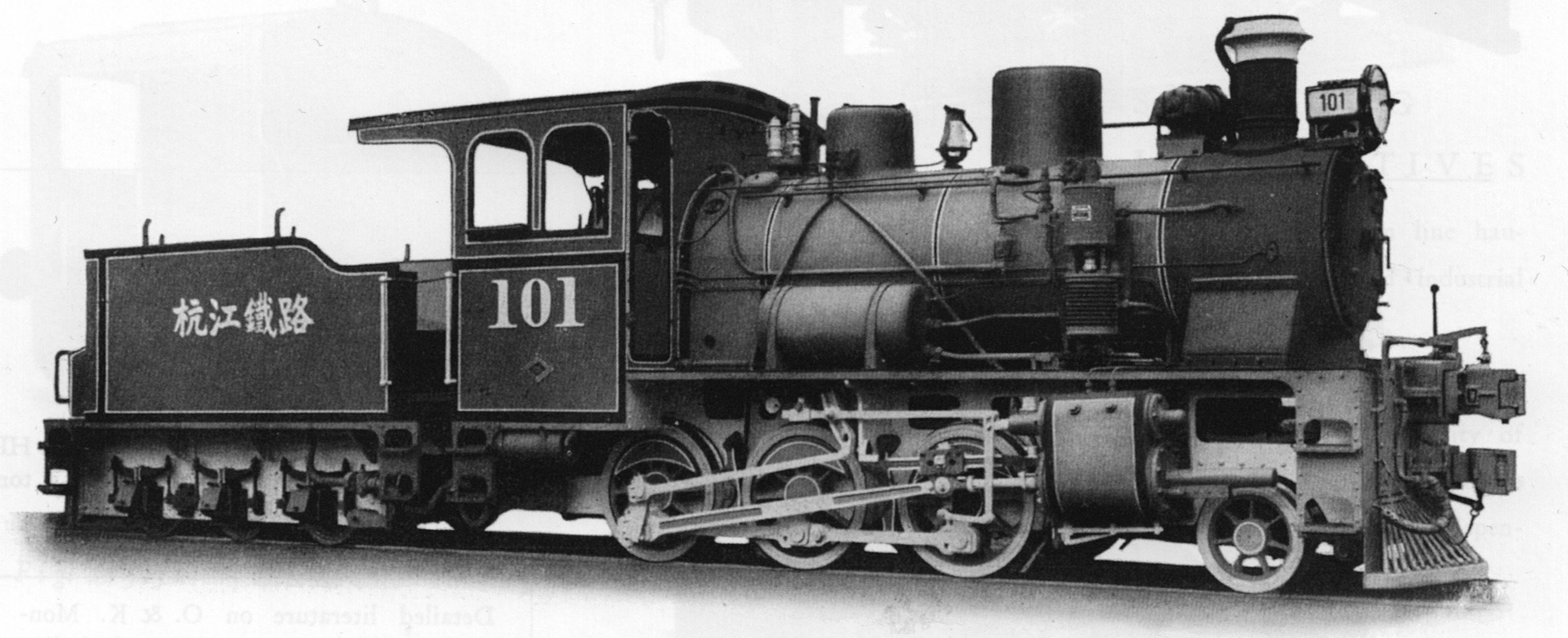
Locomotive with six coupled wheels and front bissels, type 2-6-0, for coal, service weight 28.3 t + 21.5 t, built for a Chinese Railway

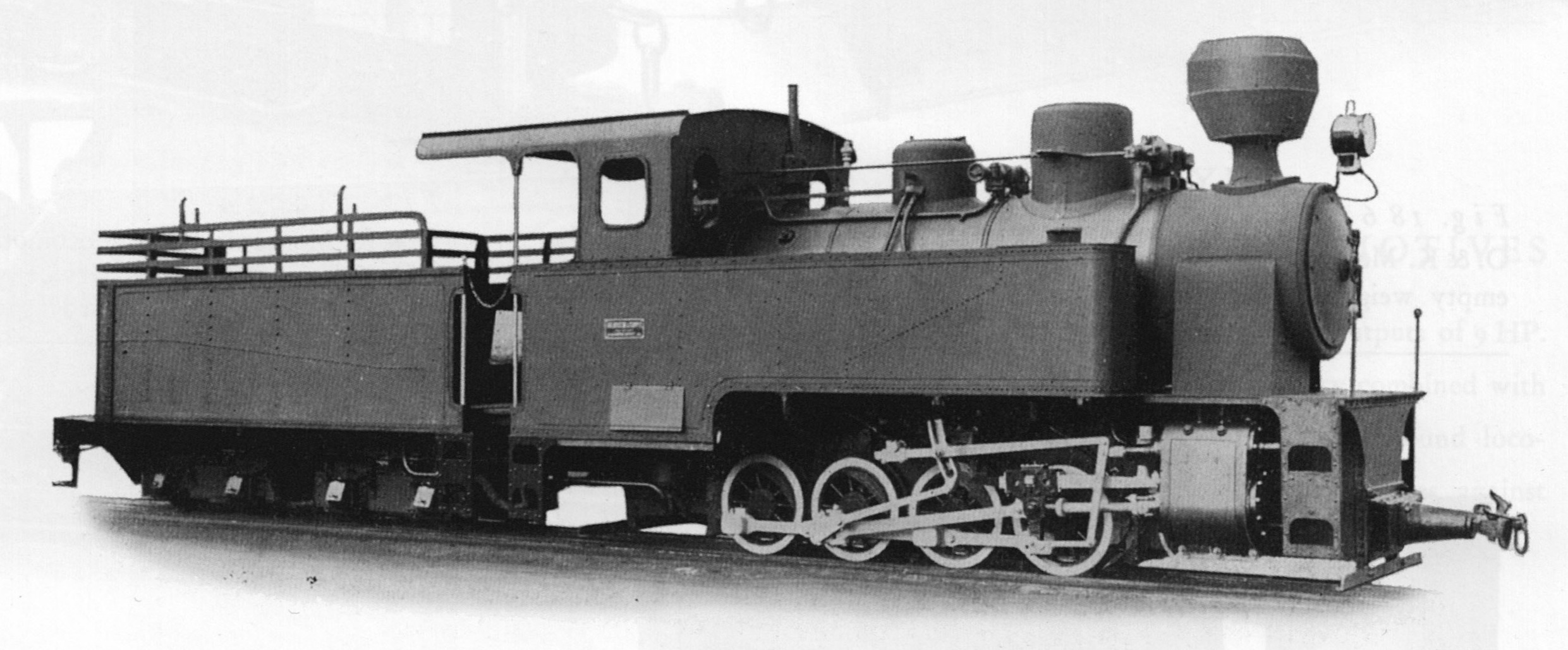
Eight-wheel coupled locomotive, type 0-8-0, 150 hp, 2 ft 6 in (762 mm) gauge for wood fuel with separate tender, built for Siam

Locomotives with a separate tender did not carry all their fuel and water on board the locomotive and were thus particularly useful for travelling long distances without being refuelled. The locomotives were equipped to be either heated by coal, wood or oil, because a larger heating and grate area were required. The main types had from four to twelve wheels for the locomotive and four, six or eight wheels on the tender.

The water tanks were firmly fastened to the frame of the tender, while maintaining a low centre of gravity. The coupling between locomotive and tender was similar to that of the waggons, to ensure that the locomotive could be driven without the tender for shunting or on short distances. The tender was easily accessible from the engineer's cab. If the locomotive was heated by wood, the tender had a special fence to increase the volume of its load.

=== Coupled compound locomotives (Type 0-6-6-0, Kitson-Meyer design) ===
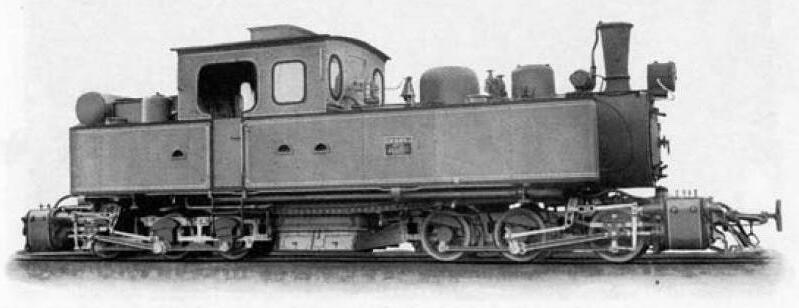
O&K 11350/1927 (Type 0-6-6-0, Kitson-Meyer design) for Puente Alto-El Volcán Railway

After Orenstein & Koppel (O&K) had delivered the prototype of a Kitson-Meyer locomotive for the 600 mm (1 ft 11 5/8 in) gauge to the Chilean military railway in 1927, an order for three locomotives followed in 1937. In 1939, the locomotives with the factory numbers 13306 to 13308 were completed. The locomotives had riveted bridge and bogie frames. The boiler, cab, reservoir and ash box were also riveted. The engines located at the two bogie ends worked on the centre axle set. This wheelset could also be sanded. The control system was of the Heusinger type. While the prototype had a Westinghouse brake, the production locomotives had a Knorr brake. The air pump was attached to the rear water tank, while the main air tank was above it on the water tank. The locomotive had electrically operated headlights.

Due to the beginning of the Second World War, the vehicles could not be delivered to Chile. They were then tested by O&K on the Rehagen-Klausdorf army training area and probably also on lines of the Mecklenburg-Pomeranian narrow-gauge railway. In 1944, the Deutsche Reichsbahn acquired the locomotives to use them on lines in occupied Poland. Therefore, in the second half of the same year, they were handed over to Gedob Direktion Krakow, where they were stationed at BW Jedrzejow.

== Literature ==
- Roland Bude, Klaus Fricke and Martin Murray: O&K-Dampflokomotiven : Lieferverzeichnis 1892–1945. Verlag Railroadiana, Buschhoven 1978, ISBN 3-921894-00-X. (Partial reprint of an Orenstein & Koppel publication)
- Delivery lists of the locomotive works at werkbahn.de (nominal charge)
