= History of rail transport in Burundi =

The history of rail transport in Burundi is limited to a now closed industrial railway, and a number of proposed railway projects that, as of 2012, had not been implemented.

== Port of Bujumbura railway ==
From 1947 to 1982, there was a 600 mm (1 ft 11 5/8 in) narrow gauge industrial railway within the boundaries of the Port of Bujumbura on Lake Tanganyika. The railway carried only goods traffic. Its operator was Office Congolais des Chemins des fer des Grands Lacs (CFL).

== Proposed railways ==
Since around the turn of the 21st century, there have been several proposals for a railway between Burundi and nearby countries. The existing railway networks in nearby Uganda, Kenya and Tanzania use 1,000 mm (3 ft 3 3/8 in) metre gauge, although TAZARA and other nearby countries, including the Democratic Republic of the Congo (DRC) use the 3 ft 6 in (1,067 mm) gauge leading to some potential difficulties.

As early as the 1980s, the Kagera Basin Organization carried out economic feasibility studies into a would-be KBO railway system linking Burundi, Rwanda and the (DRC), but that proposed system never came to fruition.

In 2000, the Common Market for Eastern and Southern Africa (COMESA) launched the Great Lakes railway project involving both rail and water transport on Lakes Tanganyika, Kivu, and Edward connecting Burundi, the DRC, Rwanda, Uganda, and Zambia. The aim of that project was to improve connections between the Great Lakes and the southern African 3 ft 6 in (1,067 mm) rail network. As with the would-be KBO railway system, the COMESA proposal was not implemented.

By 2004, the Northern Corridor Transit and Transport Coordination Authority, based in Mombasa, Kenya, was promoting a project to link Kisangani with Mombasa using a new line from Kasese to Kisangani, with feeder lines linking Kasese with Goma and then via Bukavu to Kigali and Bujumbura.

At a meeting in August 2006 with members of the Rwanda Patriotic Front, Chinese diplomat Wu Guanzheng confirmed the intention of the People's Republic of China to fund a study into the feasibility of constructing a railway connecting at Isaka with the existing metre gauge Tanzanian railway network, and running via Kigali in Rwanda through to Burundi.

In January 2022, the governments of Burundi and Tanzania announced the planned construction of an electrified standard gauge railway, which will link the two countries. The line is known as the Tanzania–Burundi Standard Gauge Railway.

== See also ==
- History of rail transport
- History of Burundi
- Transport in Burundi
