= Masaka Inland Container Depot =

Port in Kigali, Rwanda

- Interactive map of Masaka Inland Container Depot
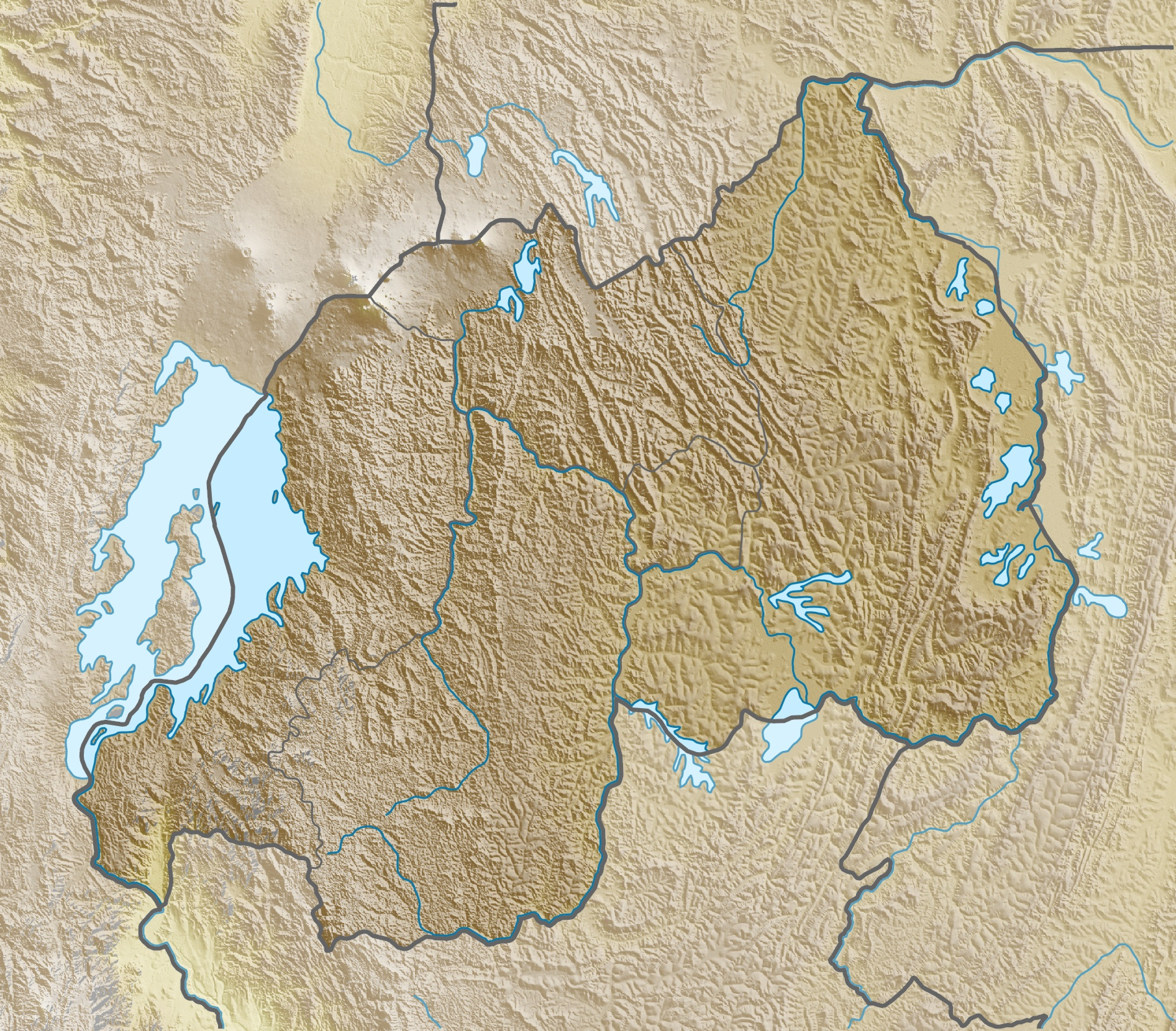
- Location in Rwanda

Location
- Country: Rwanda
- Location: Masaka, Kigali, Rwanda
- Coordinates: 02°00′49″S 30°12′09″E

Details
- Opened: January 2019 (Expected)
- Land area: 30 hectares (74 acres)

The Masaka Inland Container Depot (MICD), is a dry port, in Kigali, the capital city and largest city of Rwanda.

== Location ==
The facility is located in the neighborhood of Masaka, in the city of Kigali, approximately 17.5 kilometres (11 mi) east of the city's central business district.

== Overview ==
In January 2016, the government of Rwanda signed an agreement with Dubai Ports World (DP World) to construct what is officially referred to as the Kigali Logistics Platform (KLP). DP World would then manage and operate the dry depot for 25 years from the date of completion.

The development sits on 30 hectares (74 acres) of real estate. Onsite services include customs inspection and clearance services, revenue service, maintenance and repair facilities, banking facilities and IT facilities.

The dry port provide loading and unloading facilities for transport trucks, warehousing, and cold storage. With 12,000 m2 of container yard, Masaka Inland Container Depot can handle an estimated 50,000 TEU annually. Imports from overseas can also be distributed through the logistics chain to neighboring, Goma and Bukavu cities in D.R Congo's North and South Kivu provinces. The facility is linked to the Port of Dar es Salaam the main entrance point for the Central Corridor.

== Construction ==
The first phase of the inland port was constructed between 2016 and 2018, on 13 hectares (32 acres) at a budgeted cost of US$35 million.

The second phase, which is expected to follow the first, includes the construction of modern cold storage facilities on 7 hectares (17 acres). The cost of both phases is budgeted at US$80 million.

== See also ==
- Isaka-Kigali Standard Gauge Railway
- Rwanda Standard Gauge Railway
