= East African Railway Master Plan =

Proposal for updating railways serving east African countries

Railway lines built, planned and under construction, as of 2021

The East African Railway Master Plan is a proposal for rejuvenating the railways serving Tanzania, Kenya, and Uganda, and building new railways to serve Rwanda and Burundi. The objective is to further the economic development of East Africa by increasing the efficiency and speed, and lowering the cost, of transporting cargo between major ports on the Indian Ocean coast and the interior.

A later step would expand the East African railway network to South Sudan, Ethiopia, and the Democratic Republic of the Congo (DR Congo). The plan is managed by infrastructure ministers from participating East African Community countries in association with transport consultation firm CPCS Transcom.

All new railways will be standard-gauge, and existing narrow-gauge railways will be rehabilitated. The plan accounts for break of gauge issues and aims for a good interoperability within the resulting hybrid railway network.

== New railways ==
The members of the Northern Corridor Integration Project (NCIP) have agreed to build all of their railways to the Chinese National Railway Class 1 standard. The Central Corridor / Dar es Salaam-Isaka-Kigali/Keza-Musongati Railway Project countries (Tanzania, Rwanda, and Burundi) have selected the Chinese Class 2 standard and/or the American Railway Engineering and Maintenance-of-Way Association standard.

=== New railways between and within the core countries of the Master Plan ===
Country	Railway	Gauge	Electrification	Signaling	Status
Kenya	Mombasa–Nairobi Standard Gauge Railway	1,435 mm (4 ft 8 1/2 in) (Northern Corridor Integration Projects)	Uncertain.	automatic block	Fully operational with diesel haulage.
Kenya	Nairobi–Malaba Standard Gauge Railway	1,435 mm (4 ft 8 1/2 in) (Northern Corridor Integration Projects)	none (25 kV 50 Hz AC proposed, but no funding yet)	automatic block	under construction (SGR phase 2A)
Uganda	Uganda Standard Gauge Railway	1,435 mm (4 ft 8 1/2 in) (Northern Corridor Integration Projects)	none (25 kV 50 Hz AC proposed, but no funding yet)	automatic block	proposed
Tanzania	Tanzania Standard Gauge Railway	1,435 mm (4 ft 8 1/2 in) (Central Corridor / DIKKM projects)	25 kV 50 Hz AC	automatic block	Phase 1 complete, 2, 3 and 5 under construction
Rwanda	Rwanda Standard Gauge Railway	1,435 mm (4 ft 8 1/2 in) (Central Corridor / DIKKM projects)	25 kV 50 Hz AC	automatic block	planned
Tanzania	Isaka–Kigali Standard Gauge Railway	1,435 mm (4 ft 8 1/2 in) (Central Corridor / DIKKM projects)	25 kV 50 Hz AC	automatic block	commencement phase
Rwanda	Isaka–Kigali Standard Gauge Railway	1,435 mm (4 ft 8 1/2 in) (Central Corridor / DIKKM projects)	25 kV 50 Hz AC	automatic block	commencement phase
Tanzania	Tanzania–Burundi Standard Gauge Railway	1,435 mm (4 ft 8 1/2 in) (Central Corridor / DIKKM projects)	25 kV 50 Hz AC	automatic block	under construction
Burundi	Tanzania–Burundi Standard Gauge Railway	1,435 mm (4 ft 8 1/2 in) (Central Corridor / DIKKM projects)	25 kV 50 Hz AC	automatic block	under construction
Rwanda	Kigali–Kampala Standard Gauge Railway	1,435 mm (4 ft 8 1/2 in) (Central Corridor / DIKKM projects)	25 kV 50 Hz AC	automatic block	proposed
Uganda	Kigali–Kampala Standard Gauge Railway	1,435 mm (4 ft 8 1/2 in) (Central Corridor / DIKKM projects)	25 kV 50 Hz AC	automatic block	proposed

=== New railway links from Master Plan core countries to other countries ===
In addition to the railways mentioned above, there are ideas for new standard-gauge railway lines under the plan. They are by definition international lines between Master Plan countries and third countries. But the table in the following also contains domestic railway lines within third countries, as it is possible to connect to these railways through railways featured by the Master Plan.

Country	Railway	Gauge	Electrification	Signaling	Status
Ethiopia	Nairobi–Addis Ababa Railway	1,435 mm (4 ft 8 1/2 in) (NCIP)	unknown	unknown	Lamu Port and Lamu-Southern Sudan-Ethiopia Transport Corridor proposed
Kenya	Nairobi–Addis Ababa Railway	1,435 mm (4 ft 8 1/2 in) (NCIP)	unknown	unknown	Lamu Port and Lamu-Southern Sudan-Ethiopia Transport Corridor proposed
Kenya	Lamu–Juba Railway; Kisumu–Juba Railway	1,435 mm (4 ft 8 1/2 in) (NCIP)	unknown	unknown	Lamu Port and Lamu-Southern Sudan-Ethiopia Transport Corridor proposed
South Sudan	Lamu–Juba Railway; Kisumu–Juba Railway	1,435 mm (4 ft 8 1/2 in) (NCIP)	unknown	unknown	Lamu Port and Lamu-Southern Sudan-Ethiopia Transport Corridor proposed
Uganda	Malaba–Juba Railway	1,435 mm (4 ft 8 1/2 in) (NCIP)	unknown	unknown	proposed
South Sudan	Malaba–Juba Railway	1,435 mm (4 ft 8 1/2 in) (NCIP)	unknown	unknown	proposed
Uganda	Kampala–Kisangani Railway	1,435 mm (4 ft 8 1/2 in) (NCIP)	unknown	unknown	proposed
(Democratic Republic of the Congo) DR Congo	Kampala–Kisangani Railway	1,435 mm (4 ft 8 1/2 in) (NCIP)	unknown	unknown	proposed

== Existing railways ==
The Eastern African Railway Master Plan is not only taking new standard-gauge railways under the Master Plan into account, but also existing colonial era narrow-gauge railways, including Lake Victoria train ferries and pre-existing standard-gauge railways. It is planned to "rehabilitate" and to use some of the existing narrow-gauge railways in addition to the new standard-gauge railways to provide additional routes for cargo transports. For the break of gauge handling between the different railway gauges, see below. Only railways relatively close to the new railway network are shown in the table.

Country	Railway	Gauge	Electrification	Status
(Democratic Republic of the Congo) DR Congo	Vicicongo line	600 mm (1 ft 11 5/8 in)	no	mostly out of use
East Africa	Lake Victoria ferries	1,000 mm (3 ft 3 3/8 in)	no	somewhat operational
Kenya	Kenya Railways Corporation	1,000 mm (3 ft 3 3/8 in)	no	lack of maintenance, partially out of use
Uganda	Uganda Railways Corporation	1,000 mm (3 ft 3 3/8 in)	no	lack of maintenance, partially out of use
Tanzania	Tanzania Railways Corporation	1,000 mm (3 ft 3 3/8 in)	no	lack of maintenance, partially operational
Tanzania	TAZARA Railway	1,067 mm (3 ft 6 in)	no	lack of maintenance, somewhat operational
Zambia	TAZARA Railway	1,067 mm (3 ft 6 in)	no	lack of maintenance, somewhat operational
South Sudan	Babanusa-Wau Railway	1,067 mm (3 ft 6 in)	no	minimally operational
(Democratic Republic of the Congo) DR Congo	Great Lakes Railway	1,067 mm (3 ft 6 in)	no	not operational
Djibouti	Addis Ababa–Djibouti Railway	1,435 mm (4 ft 8 1/2 in)	25 kV 50 Hz AC	operational
Ethiopia	Addis Ababa–Djibouti Railway	1,435 mm (4 ft 8 1/2 in)	25 kV 50 Hz AC	operational
Ethiopia	Awash–Weldiya Railway; Weldiya–Mekelle Railway	1,435 mm (4 ft 8 1/2 in)	25 kV 50 Hz AC	under construction
Burundi	no railways yet	1,435 mm (4 ft 8 1/2 in)	25 kV 50 Hz AC	proposed
Rwanda	no railways yet	1,435 mm (4 ft 8 1/2 in)	25 kV 50 Hz AC	proposed

== Break of gauge handling and passenger transfer ==
The combination of railways with different track gauges into a hybrid railway network requires measures to make the different railways interoperable despite the break of gauge problem. In East Africa, this applies to the new standard-gauge railway network and to the old and eventually rehabilitated narrow-gauge railway network. Two methods exist within the East African Railway Master Plan countries for break of gauge handling and passenger transfers.

Break of gauge handling of cargo always needs to consider the much lower axle loads and different loading gauges on the narrow-gauge railway network. Therefore, the East African Railway Master Plan considers the new standard-gauge railways to become the backbone of the whole hybrid railway network, with narrow-gauge railways assuming the role of branch lines.

Break of gauge handling is usually done in dedicated break of gauge railway stations. The only existing break of gauge railway station within the reaches of the East African Railway Master Plan is the break of gauge transshipment station at Kidatu in Tanzania, which uses cranes for the transshipment of goods, especially containers, between the TAZARA Railway network (1,067 mm (3 ft 6 in)) and the Tanzania Railways Corporation network (1,000 mm (3 ft 3 3/8 in)). New break of gauge handling stations are to be constructed between the standard-gauge railway backbone and eventually rehabilitated narrow-gauge branch lines. As of September 2018, no actively planned break of gauge railway stations are in consideration.

Another method is to build a railway station of the standard-gauge railway in the immediate vicinity to an old railway station of the narrow-gauge railway network – which then allows passenger transfers between both railway stations. There is only one example for that as of September 2018. The Nairobi Terminus railway station of the new Mombasa–Nairobi Standard Gauge Railway is located in the southern Nairobi suburb of Syokimau just opposite of the Syokimau Terminus of the Nairobi rail service, a narrow-gauge commuter rail service linking Syokimau with Nairobi Central Station and the Nairobi Central Business District.

=== Break of gauge devices ===
Methods of overcoming the breaks of gauge include

Transhipment of passengers and freight.
Variable gauge axles (VGA)
Dual gauge track as in Ghana

== See also ==
- Cape to Cairo Railway
- Northern Corridor Transit and Transport Coordination Authority
- North–South Corridor Project
- Rail transport in Ethiopia
- Rail transport in Kenya
- Rail transport in Rwanda
- Rwanda Standard Gauge Railway
- Rail transport in South Sudan
- Rail transport in Tanzania
- Rift Valley Railways Consortium
- Transport in Burundi
