= Rail transport in Rwanda =

There are several planned railway lines in Rwanda, including a line to Tanzania. Historical railways are limited to three industrial railways.

== China's One Belt One Road Policy ==
The Belt and Road Initiative was unveiled by General Secretary of the Chinese Communist Party Xi Jinping in late 2013, and was thereafter promoted by Premier of China Li Keqiang during state visits to Asia and Europe. A railroad will be created to link Kigali, the capital of Rwanda, to the port of Mombasa in Kenya.

== History ==
Rwanda has only ever had three 600 mm (1 ft 11 5/8 in) narrow gauge industrial railways. None of them has ever offered passenger services.

The industrial railways were operated initially by:

- Société Minière de Muhinga et de Kigali, in the (SOMUKI) Muhinga and Kigali mines from 1924,
- Société des mines d’etain du Ruanda-Urundi (Minétain), in the Katumba mine from 1928,
- Société des Mines de Rwanda (SOMIRWA), in the Karuruma tin refinery from 1982.

Until 1988, all three of these businesses were united as the Régie d’Exploitation et de Développement des Mines (RÉDEMI), which also operated the three railways. However, in the ensuing 20 years the railways were severely damaged by the Rwandan Civil War and Rwandan genocide. It may well be that they are no longer in operation.

== Proposals ==
Since around the turn of the 21st century, there have been several proposals for a railway between Rwanda and neighbouring countries. The existing railway networks in nearby Uganda, Kenya and Tanzania use 1,000 mm (3 ft 3 3/8 in) metre gauge, but TAZARA and other nearby countries, including the Democratic Republic of the Congo (DRC) use the 3 ft 6 in (1,067 mm) gauge, leading to some potential difficulties.

As early as the 1980s, the Kagera Basin Organization carried out economic feasibility studies into a would-be KBO railway system linking Burundi, Rwanda and the DRC, but that proposed system never came to fruition.

In 2000, the Common Market for Eastern and Southern Africa (COMESA) launched the Great Lakes railway project involving both rail and water transport on Lakes Tanganyika, Kivu, and Edward connecting Burundi, the DRC, Rwanda, Uganda, and Zambia. The aim of that project was to improve connections between the Great Lakes and the southern African 3 ft 6 in (1,067 mm) gauge rail network. COMESA commissioned a South African engineering firm, Makhosi Holdings, to carry out a feasibility study into several Great Lakes railway project routes agreed by COMESA members.

Simultaneously, another team of South African engineers was engaged by COMESA to undertake a feasibility study for an alternative rail link in Rwanda, running 150 kilometres (93 mi) southeast from Kigali to Isaka, where it would have connected with the existing metre gauge Tanzanian railway network. As with the would-be KBO railway system, however, the COMESA proposals were not implemented.

By 2004, the newly founded Northern Corridor Transit and Transport Coordination Authority, based in Mombasa, Kenya, was promoting a project to link Kisangani with Mombasa using a new line from Kasese to Kisangani, with feeder lines linking Kasese with Goma and then via Bukavu to Kigali and Bujumbura. Two years later, at a meeting in August 2006 with members of the Rwanda Patriotic Front, Wu Guanzheng confirmed the intention of the People's Republic of China to fund a study into the feasibility of constructing a railway connecting with the Tanzanian railway network at Isaka, and running via Kigali in Rwanda through to Burundi.

=== Burundi / Rwanda rail plans of 2000 ===
In 2000 Burundi and Rwanda announced plans to build a rail line linking their two countries to the Tanzanian rail network, and thus to the Indian Ocean port of Dar es Salaam.

=== 2006 delay ===
According to the Rwanda News Agency the African Development Bank was responsible for a 2006 delay in surveying the route of a rail link from Isaka through Rwanda's capital Kigali to Bujumbura. The initial feasibility study was to cost $2.7 million. According to the Rwandan News Agency officials stated the African Development Bank was to have loaned 90% of the cost of the railway, with the remainder paid by Tanzania and Rwanda.

The Rwanda News Agency reported that an Indian firm named RITES was expected to take over the contract for the management of the Isaka line.

A delegation from the American railroad BNSF also met with President Paul Kagame to discuss a route from Kigali to Isaka and at the same time the government announced that it had selected a German consulting company to undertake pilot work for the proposed mail line.

=== Chinese survey of 2007 ===
China had played a big role in building the TAZARA part of Tanzania's rail network, and in 2007 conducted a survey for extending the network into Rwanda.

=== 2008 plan ===
On January 26, 2008 Rwanda's President announced plans for BNSF Railway to build a link from Rwanda's capital Kigali to Tanzania's rail network in Isaka, Tanzania. Some reports state the new line would be a narrow gauge, like the rest of Tanzania's rail service. Other reports state that Tanzania has already decided to upgrade its Isaka line to standard gauge, and that the Isaki-Kigali link would also be standard gauge. Yet other reports state that the Isaka-Rwanda leg would be of standard gauge and that cargo would be transshipped to different rolling stock in Isaka.

According to Reuters political unrest in neighboring Kenya has disrupted the reliability of road and rail service through Kenya, and the Rwandan line would allow rail transport to bypass Kenya if rail transport was disrupted there in future.

The proposed plan was projected to be complete by 2013. Projected costs have not yet been announced.

=== 2013 plan ===
More plans are being made for a link from Uganda.

Opening ceremony in November 2013 for standard gauge railway from Mombasa, Kenya via Nairobi and Kampala to Rwanda and Burundi.

== Under construction ==
- (Standard gauge opening ceremony Nov 2013) New stations are bound to come up after the completion of the standard gauge railway
- (Kenya) Mombassa - port
- (Kenya) Emali - concrete sleepers
- Nairobi - capital of Kenya
- Kampala - capital of Uganda
- Kigali - capital of Rwanda
- Bujumbura - former capital of Burundi

== Technical measures to overcome break of gauge ==
On 31 May 2008, a proposal to link the railways of Egypt, 1,435 mm (4 ft 8 1/2 in) gauge, and Sudan, 1,067 mm (3 ft 6 in) gauge, surfaced, with "Technical measures" to overcome the break of gauge. What exactly these technical measures are was not revealed, but they presumably could be used on the new line to Kigali.

== Rail links with adjacent countries ==
- Democratic Republic of Congo - 1,067 mm (3 ft 6 in) gauge
- Burundi - no railways yet
- Uganda - 1,000 mm (3 ft 3 3/8 in) gauge
- Tanzania - 1,000 mm (3 ft 3 3/8 in) and 1,067 mm (3 ft 6 in) TAZARA - construction to start soon.
- Kenya - 1,000 mm (3 ft 3 3/8 in) but proposed change to 1,435 mm (4 ft 8 1/2 in) gauge.

== See also ==
- East African Railway Master Plan
- Rwanda
- Transport in Rwanda
