= Rwanda Standard Gauge Railway =

Overview
- Status: In development
- Termini: Rusumo, Kagitumba, Kigali; Bugesera Airport, Gisenyi, Nemba

Service
- Type: Heavy rail
- Operator(s): Rwanda Transport Development Agency

Technical
- Line length: 500 km (310 mi)
- Track gauge: 1,435 mm (4 ft 8 1/2 in) standard gauge

The Rwanda Standard Gauge Railway is a standard gauge railway (SGR) system, under development, linking the country to the neighboring countries of Tanzania and Uganda. It is intended to ease the transfer of goods between the Indian Ocean ports of Dar es Salaam and Mombasa, and the Rwandan capital Kigali. The system is expected to link, in the future, to Rwanda's two other neighbors, Burundi and the Democratic Republic of the Congo, as part of the East African Railway Master Plan. With no previously existing railway network, Rwanda is developing its railway system from scratch. The project is dependent on the construction of the Tanzanian and Ugandan SGR lines to the Rwandan border, which have not been completed as of October 2023.

== Location ==
The railway system would consist of several major sections:

Rusumo–Kigali Section

This section, measuring 150 kilometres (93 mi), is the Rwandan half of the Isaka–Kigali Standard Gauge Railway, a joint railway between the governments of Rwanda and Tanzania. Construction was originally scheduled to begin in October 2018, but has been postponed as the Tanzanian link to the Rwandan border was delayed. The section is budgeted to cost US$857 million. A feasibility study for this section has been conducted and demarcation of the corridor is finalized.

Kigali–Rubavu Section

When the SGR reaches Kigali, the governments of Rwanda and the DR Congo are expected to work out the modalities for the extension of this railway system to DR Congo territory. The planned section from Kigali to the border district of Rubavu on the northern shore of Lake Kivu is about 150 kilometres (93 mi) long. In June 2019, the government of the DR Congo indicated its willingness to participate in a feasibility study for the SGR to extend to Rubavu and the Congolese city of Goma.

Kigali–Bugesera Airport–Nemba Section

This section, measuring about 60 kilometres (37 mi), stretching from Masaka, in Kigali, through Bugesera International Airport to Nemba, at the international border with Burundi, is yet to be awarded to a contractor, as of September 2018. The government of Rwanda has committed to extending the SGR to Bugesera International Airport, at a budgeted cost of US$85 million.

Kagitumba–Kigali Section

When the Uganda Standard Gauge Railway is built, it will connect to the Rwandan SGR at Mirama Hills/Kagitumba. From there, the line would pass through Nyagatare, Gatsibo, Gicumbi, Rwamagana, Gasabo and terminate at Masaka for cargo and Ndera for passengers. Rwanda has finalized the demarcation of the corridor for this section. It measures approximately 170 kilometres (106 mi). In May 2023, Uganda and Rwanda agreed to fast-track the section of the Ugandan SGR connecting to Rwanda. Construction of the Ugandan section is expected to begin in September 2024 and to be completed in 2029.

== Overview ==
This 1435 mm (4 ft 8 1/2 in) railway line is intended to ease the transfer of goods between the ports of Dar es Salaam and Mombasa, to Kigali in Rwanda and subsequently to Bujumbura in Burundi, and to Goma, in the Democratic Republic of the Congo. In conformity with its neighbors Uganda and Tanzania, Rwanda will use electricity at 25kVAC to power its locomotives. This will allow passenger locomotive speeds of 160 kilometres (99 mi) per hour and cargo locomotive speeds of 120 kilometres (75 mi) per hour. In July 2021, Rwandan minister of infrastructure Claver Gatete confirmed that construction would begin as soon as the Tanzanian SGR reaches Isaka. The cost for the railway system is estimated at US$1.3 billion.

== See also ==
- Standard-gauge railway
- Uganda Standard Gauge Railway
- Tanzania Standard Gauge Railway
- Isaka–Kigali Standard Gauge Railway
- East African Railway Master Plan
- Northern Corridor
- Central Corridor
