= 2013 Dollar General 200 =

Second race of the 2013 NASCAR Nationwide Series

2013 Dollar General 200 fueled by AmeriGas
Race details
- Race 2 of 33 of the 2013 NASCAR Nationwide Series
- Date: March 2, 2013
- Official name: 8th Annual Dollar General 200 fueled by AmeriGas
- Location: Avondale, Arizona, Phoenix International Raceway
- Course: Permanent racing facility
- Course length: 1 miles (1.6 km)
- Distance: 200 laps, 200 mi (321.868 km)
- Scheduled distance: 200 laps, 200 mi (321.868 km)
- Average speed: 96.192 miles per hour (154.806 km/h)

Pole position
Driver	Kyle Busch	Joe Gibbs Racing
- Time: 27.056

Most laps led
Driver	Kyle Busch	Joe Gibbs Racing
- Laps: 142

Winner
No. 54	Kyle Busch	Joe Gibbs Racing

Television in the United States
- Network: ESPN
- Announcers: Allen Bestwick, Dale Jarrett, Andy Petree

Radio in the United States
- Radio: Motor Racing Network

The 2013 Dollar General 200 fueled by AmeriGas was the second stock car race of the 2013 NASCAR Nationwide Series and the eighth iteration of the event. The race was held on Saturday, March 2, 2013, in Avondale, Arizona at Phoenix International Raceway, a 1-mile (1.6 km) permanent low-banked tri-oval race track. The race took the scheduled 200 laps to complete. At race's end, Joe Gibbs Racing driver Kyle Busch would dominate the weekend to win his 52nd career NASCAR Nationwide Series win and his first of the season. To fill out the podium, Brad Keselowski of Penske Racing and Justin Allgaier of Turner Scott Motorsports would finish second and third, respectively.

== Background ==
The layout of Phoenix International Raceway, the venue where the race was held.

Phoenix International Raceway – also known as PIR – is a one-mile, low-banked tri-oval race track located in Avondale, Arizona. It is named after the nearby metropolitan area of Phoenix. The motorsport track opened in 1964 and currently hosts two NASCAR race weekends annually. PIR has also hosted the IndyCar Series, CART, USAC and the Rolex Sports Car Series. The raceway is currently owned and operated by International Speedway Corporation.

The raceway was originally constructed with a 2.5 mi (4.0 km) road course that ran both inside and outside of the main tri-oval. In 1991 the track was reconfigured with the current 1.51 mi (2.43 km) interior layout. PIR has an estimated grandstand seating capacity of around 67,000. Lights were installed around the track in 2004 following the addition of a second annual NASCAR race weekend.

=== Entry list ===
#	Driver	Team	Make	Sponsor
00	Jason White	SR² Motorsports	Toyota	Headrush
01	Mike Wallace	JD Motorsports	Chevrolet	Verve! Gold
2	Brian Scott	Richard Childress Racing	Chevrolet	Whitetail Club
3	Austin Dillon	Richard Childress Racing	Chevrolet	AdvoCare
4	Daryl Harr	JD Motorsports	Chevrolet	iWorld
5	Jimmie Johnson	JR Motorsports	Chevrolet	Great Clips
6	Trevor Bayne	Roush Fenway Racing	Ford	Valvoline NextGen
7	Regan Smith	JR Motorsports	Chevrolet	TaxSlayer
10	Jeff Green	TriStar Motorsports	Toyota	TriStar Motorsports
11	Elliott Sadler	Joe Gibbs Racing	Toyota	OneMain Financial
12	Sam Hornish Jr.	Penske Racing	Ford	Detroit Genuine Parts
14	Eric McClure	TriStar Motorsports	Toyota	Hefty, Reynolds Wrap
15	Juan Carlos Blum	Rick Ware Racing	Ford	VMP Nutrition
18	Matt Kenseth	Joe Gibbs Racing	Toyota	Reser's Fine Foods
19	Mike Bliss	TriStar Motorsports	Toyota	TriStar Motorsports
20	Brian Vickers	Joe Gibbs Racing	Toyota	Dollar General
22	Brad Keselowski	Penske Racing	Ford	Discount Tire
23	Harrison Rhodes	Rick Ware Racing	Ford	Chick-fil-A, Timeshare Spot
24	Blake Koch	SR² Motorsports	Toyota	I Am Second
27	Michael McDowell*	SR² Motorsports	Toyota	
30	Nelson Piquet Jr.	Turner Scott Motorsports	Chevrolet	Worx Yard Tools
31	Justin Allgaier	Turner Scott Motorsports	Chevrolet	Brandt Professional Agriculture
32	Kyle Larson	Turner Scott Motorsports	Chevrolet	Eveready
33	Kevin Harvick	Richard Childress Racing	Chevrolet	Menards, Rheem
40	Reed Sorenson	The Motorsports Group	Chevrolet	The Motorsports Group
42	Josh Wise	The Motorsports Group	Chevrolet	The Motorsports Group
43	Aric Almirola	Richard Petty Motorsports	Ford	Pilot Flying J
44	Hal Martin	TriStar Motorsports	Toyota	American Custom Yachts
46	Chase Miller	The Motorsports Group	Chevrolet	The Motorsports Group
51	Ryan Sieg	Jeremy Clements Racing	Chevrolet	Jeremy Clements Racing
52	Joey Gase	Jimmy Means Racing	Chevrolet	Better Business Bureau
54	Kyle Busch	Joe Gibbs Racing	Toyota	Monster Energy
55	Jamie Dick	Viva Motorsports	Chevrolet	Viva Motorsports
60	Travis Pastrana	Roush Fenway Racing	Ford	Roush Fenway Racing
70	Johanna Long	ML Motorsports	Chevrolet	Foretravel Motorcoach
74	Mike Harmon	Mike Harmon Racing	Chevrolet	Mike Harmon Racing
77	Parker Kligerman	Kyle Busch Motorsports	Toyota	Toyota
79	Jeffrey Earnhardt	Go Green Racing	Ford	Uponor Plumbing Systems, reload.biz
87	Joe Nemechek	NEMCO Motorsports	Toyota	AM/FM Energy Wood & Pellet Stoves
89	Morgan Shepherd*	Shepherd Racing Ventures	Chevrolet	Hyland's Leg Cramps
92	Dexter Stacey	KH Motorsports	Ford	Maddie's Place Rocks
99	Alex Bowman	RAB Racing	Toyota	St. Jude Children's Research Hospital, Port of Tucson
Official entry list

*Withdrew.

== Practice ==
=== First practice ===
The first practice session was held on Friday, March 1, at 10:00 AM MST, and would last for an hour and 20 minutes. Austin Dillon of Richard Childress Racing would set the fastest time in the session, with a lap of 27.050 and an average speed of 133.087 miles per hour (214.183 km/h).

Pos.	#	Driver	Team	Make	Time	Speed
1	3	Austin Dillon	Richard Childress Racing	Chevrolet	27.050	133.087
2	54	Kyle Busch	Joe Gibbs Racing	Toyota	27.237	132.173
3	2	Brian Scott	Richard Childress Racing	Chevrolet	27.335	131.699
Full first practice results

=== Second and final practice ===
The second and final practice session, sometimes referred to as Happy Hour, was held on Friday, March 1, at 1:35 PM MST, and would last for 50 minutes. Kyle Busch of Joe Gibbs Racing would set the fastest time in the session, with a lap of 27.249 and an average speed of 132.115 miles per hour (212.618 km/h).

Pos.	#	Driver	Team	Make	Time	Speed
1	54	Kyle Busch	Joe Gibbs Racing	Toyota	27.249	132.115
2	5	Jimmie Johnson	JR Motorsports	Chevrolet	27.316	131.791
3	32	Kyle Larson	Turner Scott Motorsports	Chevrolet	27.365	131.555
Full Happy Hour practice results

== Qualifying ==
Qualifying was held on Saturday, March 2, at 11:35 AM MST. Each driver would have two laps to set a fastest time; the fastest of the two would count as their official qualifying lap.

Kyle Busch of Joe Gibbs Racing would win the pole, setting a time of 27.056 and an average speed of 133.057 miles per hour (214.134 km/h).

No drivers would fail to qualify.

=== Full qualifying results ===
Pos.	#	Driver	Team	Make	Time	Speed
1	54	Kyle Busch	Joe Gibbs Racing	Toyota	27.056	133.057
2	20	Brian Vickers	Joe Gibbs Racing	Toyota	27.234	132.188
3	18	Matt Kenseth	Joe Gibbs Racing	Toyota	27.252	132.100
4	6	Trevor Bayne	Roush Fenway Racing	Ford	27.289	131.921
5	31	Justin Allgaier	Turner Scott Motorsports	Chevrolet	27.300	131.868
6	3	Austin Dillon	Richard Childress Racing	Chevrolet	27.305	131.844
7	5	Jimmie Johnson	JR Motorsports	Chevrolet	27.333	131.709
8	43	Aric Almirola	Richard Petty Motorsports	Ford	27.342	131.666
9	22	Brad Keselowski	Penske Racing	Ford	27.380	131.483
10	33	Kevin Harvick	Richard Childress Racing	Chevrolet	27.394	131.416
11	77	Parker Kligerman	Kyle Busch Motorsports	Toyota	27.411	131.334
12	60	Travis Pastrana	Roush Fenway Racing	Ford	27.439	131.200
13	7	Regan Smith	JR Motorsports	Chevrolet	27.509	130.866
14	32	Kyle Larson	Turner Scott Motorsports	Chevrolet	27.513	130.847
15	11	Elliott Sadler	Joe Gibbs Racing	Toyota	27.519	130.819
16	70	Johanna Long	ML Motorsports	Chevrolet	27.639	130.251
17	55	Jamie Dick	Viva Motorsports	Chevrolet	27.695	129.987
18	99	Alex Bowman	RAB Racing	Toyota	27.706	129.936
19	12	Sam Hornish Jr.	Penske Racing	Ford	27.714	129.898
20	14	Eric McClure	TriStar Motorsports	Toyota	27.747	129.744
21	2	Brian Scott	Richard Childress Racing	Chevrolet	27.751	129.725
22	19	Mike Bliss	TriStar Motorsports	Toyota	27.788	129.552
23	30	Nelson Piquet Jr.	Turner Scott Motorsports	Chevrolet	27.852	129.255
24	44	Hal Martin	TriStar Motorsports	Toyota	27.886	129.097
25	01	Mike Wallace	JD Motorsports	Chevrolet	27.895	129.055
26	10	Jeff Green	TriStar Motorsports	Toyota	27.902	129.023
27	79	Jeffrey Earnhardt	Go Green Racing	Ford	28.117	128.036
28	92	Dexter Stacey	KH Motorsports	Ford	28.139	127.936
29	87	Joe Nemechek	NEMCO Motorsports	Toyota	28.149	127.891
30	24	Blake Koch	SR² Motorsports	Toyota	28.180	127.750
31	42	Josh Wise	The Motorsports Group	Chevrolet	28.252	127.425
32	00	Jason White	SR² Motorsports	Toyota	28.279	127.303
33	23	Harrison Rhodes	Rick Ware Racing	Ford	28.279	127.303
34	46	Chase Miller	The Motorsports Group	Chevrolet	28.282	127.289
35	51	Ryan Sieg	Jeremy Clements Racing	Chevrolet	28.327	127.087
36	40	Reed Sorenson	The Motorsports Group	Chevrolet	28.377	126.863
37	52	Joey Gase	Jimmy Means Racing	Chevrolet	28.576	125.980
38	15	Juan Carlos Blum	Rick Ware Racing	Ford	28.617	125.799
39	4	Daryl Harr	JD Motorsports	Chevrolet	28.702	125.427
40	74	Mike Harmon	Harmon-Novak Racing	Chevrolet	32.072	112.247
Withdrew
WD	27	Michael McDowell	SR² Motorsports	Toyota	—	—
WD	89	Morgan Shepherd	Shepherd Racing Ventures	Chevrolet	—	—
Official qualifying results

== Race results ==
Fin	St	#	Driver	Team	Make	Laps	Led	Status	Pts	Winnings
1	1	54	Kyle Busch	Joe Gibbs Racing	Toyota	200	142	running	0	$70,700
2	9	22	Brad Keselowski	Penske Racing	Ford	200	10	running	0	$53,450
3	5	31	Justin Allgaier	Turner Scott Motorsports	Chevrolet	200	0	running	41	$45,334
4	4	6	Trevor Bayne	Roush Fenway Racing	Ford	200	0	running	40	$35,841
5	15	11	Elliott Sadler	Joe Gibbs Racing	Toyota	200	0	running	39	$31,241
6	6	3	Austin Dillon	Richard Childress Racing	Chevrolet	200	0	running	38	$27,491
7	19	12	Sam Hornish Jr.	Penske Racing	Ford	200	0	running	37	$25,226
8	3	18	Matt Kenseth	Joe Gibbs Racing	Toyota	200	41	running	0	$17,470
9	8	43	Aric Almirola	Richard Petty Motorsports	Ford	200	0	running	0	$16,325
10	21	2	Brian Scott	Richard Childress Racing	Chevrolet	200	0	running	34	$23,816
11	13	7	Regan Smith	JR Motorsports	Chevrolet	200	0	running	33	$14,575
12	7	5	Jimmie Johnson	JR Motorsports	Chevrolet	200	0	running	0	$13,975
13	14	32	Kyle Larson	Turner Scott Motorsports	Chevrolet	200	0	running	31	$21,066
14	22	19	Mike Bliss	TriStar Motorsports	Toyota	200	0	running	30	$19,691
15	23	30	Nelson Piquet Jr.	Turner Scott Motorsports	Chevrolet	200	0	running	29	$20,016
16	30	24	Blake Koch	SR² Motorsports	Toyota	200	0	running	28	$19,441
17	2	20	Brian Vickers	Joe Gibbs Racing	Toyota	199	7	running	28	$12,375
18	36	40	Reed Sorenson	The Motorsports Group	Chevrolet	198	0	running	26	$18,841
19	11	77	Parker Kligerman	Kyle Busch Motorsports	Toyota	198	0	running	25	$19,066
20	27	79	Jeffrey Earnhardt	Go Green Racing	Ford	198	0	running	24	$19,191
21	35	51	Ryan Sieg	Jeremy Clements Racing	Chevrolet	198	0	running	0	$18,416
22	32	00	Jason White	SR² Motorsports	Toyota	197	0	running	22	$18,291
23	24	44	Hal Martin	TriStar Motorsports	Toyota	197	0	running	21	$18,166
24	28	92	Dexter Stacey	KH Motorsports	Ford	195	0	running	20	$11,425
25	33	23	Harrison Rhodes	Rick Ware Racing	Ford	194	0	running	0	$18,241
26	38	15	Juan Carlos Blum	Rick Ware Racing	Ford	193	0	running	18	$17,866
27	40	74	Mike Harmon	Harmon-Novak Racing	Chevrolet	192	0	running	17	$17,941
28	12	60	Travis Pastrana	Roush Fenway Racing	Ford	189	0	running	16	$17,666
29	20	14	Eric McClure	TriStar Motorsports	Toyota	187	0	engine	15	$17,616
30	37	52	Joey Gase	Jimmy Means Racing	Chevrolet	150	0	transmission	14	$17,866
31	18	99	Alex Bowman	RAB Racing	Toyota	142	0	running	13	$17,511
32	25	01	Mike Wallace	JD Motorsports	Chevrolet	139	0	running	12	$17,451
33	10	33	Kevin Harvick	Richard Childress Racing	Chevrolet	101	0	crash	0	$10,745
34	39	4	Daryl Harr	JD Motorsports	Chevrolet	95	0	engine	10	$17,376
35	17	55	Jamie Dick	Viva Motorsports	Chevrolet	59	0	crash	9	$10,681
36	29	87	Joe Nemechek	NEMCO Motorsports	Toyota	50	0	crash	8	$16,641
37	26	10	Jeff Green	TriStar Motorsports	Toyota	17	0	handling	7	$9,940
38	31	42	Josh Wise	The Motorsports Group	Chevrolet	10	0	brakes	6	$9,886
39	34	46	Chase Miller	The Motorsports Group	Chevrolet	8	0	vibration	5	$9,770
40	16	70	Johanna Long	ML Motorsports	Chevrolet	2	0	crash	4	$16,381
Withdrew
WD		27	Michael McDowell	SR² Motorsports	Toyota					
WD		89	Morgan Shepherd	Shepherd Racing Ventures	Chevrolet					
Official race results

Previous race: 2013 DRIVE4COPD 300	NASCAR Nationwide Series; 2013 season	Next race: 2013 Sam's Town 300
