= 2013 Sam's Town 300 =

Third race of the 2013 NASCAR Nationwide Series

Race details
- Race 3 of 33 of the 2013 NASCAR Nationwide Series
- Date: March 9, 2013
- Official name: 17th Annual Sam's Town 300
- Location: North Las Vegas, Nevada, Las Vegas Motor Speedway
- Course: Permanent racing facility
- Course length: 2.41 km (1.5 miles)
- Distance: 200 laps, 300 mi (482.803 km)
- Scheduled distance: 200 laps, 300 mi (482.803 km)
- Average speed: 125.087 miles per hour (201.308 km/h)

Pole position
Driver	Brian Vickers	Joe Gibbs Racing
- Time: Set by 2012 owner's points

Most laps led
Driver	Sam Hornish Jr.	Penske Racing
- Laps: 114

Winner
No. 12	Sam Hornish Jr.	Penske Racing

Television in the United States
- Network: ESPN2
- Announcers: Allen Bestwick, Dale Jarrett, Andy Petree

Radio in the United States
- Radio: Performance Racing Network

The 2013 Sam's Town 300 was the third stock car race of the 2013 NASCAR Nationwide Series and the 17th iteration of the event. The race was held on Saturday, March 9, 2013, in North Las Vegas, Nevada at Las Vegas Motor Speedway, a 1.5 miles (2.4 km) permanent D-shaped oval racetrack. The race took the scheduled 200 laps to complete. Sam Hornish Jr., driving for Penske Racing, would survive two ensuing restarts and defend eventual-second Joe Gibbs Racing place driver Kyle Busch to win his second career NASCAR Nationwide Series win and his first and only win of the season. To fill out the podium, Brian Vickers of Joe Gibbs Racing would finish third.

== Background ==
The layout of Las Vegas Motor Speedway, the venue where the race was held.

Las Vegas Motor Speedway, located in Clark County, Nevada outside the Las Vegas city limits and about 15 miles northeast of the Las Vegas Strip, is a 1,200-acre (490 ha) complex of multiple tracks for motorsports racing. The complex is owned by Speedway Motorsports, Inc., which is headquartered in Charlotte, North Carolina.

=== Entry list ===
#	Driver	Team	Make	Sponsor
00	Jason White	SR² Motorsports	Toyota	Headrush
01	Mike Wallace	JD Motorsports	Chevrolet	G&K Services
2	Brian Scott	Richard Childress Racing	Chevrolet	Whitetail Club
3	Austin Dillon	Richard Childress Racing	Chevrolet	AdvoCare
4	Daryl Harr	JD Motorsports	Chevrolet	iWorld
5	Brad Sweet	JR Motorsports	Chevrolet	Great Clips
6	Trevor Bayne	Roush Fenway Racing	Ford	World Financial Group
7	Regan Smith	JR Motorsports	Chevrolet	Fire Alarm Services
8	Scott Lagasse Jr.	Team SLR	Chevrolet	Hybrid Light, Boy Scouts of America
10	Jeff Green	TriStar Motorsports	Toyota	TriStar Motorsports
11	Elliott Sadler	Joe Gibbs Racing	Toyota	Interstate Batteries
12	Sam Hornish Jr.	Penske Racing	Ford	Würth
14	Eric McClure	TriStar Motorsports	Toyota	Hefty, Reynolds Wrap
15	Juan Carlos Blum	Rick Ware Racing	Ford	Western Banking Corporation
19	Mike Bliss	TriStar Motorsports	Toyota	Hefty, Reynolds Wrap
20	Brian Vickers	Joe Gibbs Racing	Toyota	Dollar General
21	Brendan Gaughan	Richard Childress Racing	Chevrolet	South Point Hotel, Casino & Spa
22	Brad Keselowski	Penske Racing	Ford	Discount Tire
23	Robert Richardson Jr.	R3 Motorsports	Chevrolet	R3 Motorsports
24	Blake Koch	SR² Motorsports	Toyota	I Am Second
30	Nelson Piquet Jr.	Turner Scott Motorsports	Chevrolet	Worx Yard Tools
31	Justin Allgaier	Turner Scott Motorsports	Chevrolet	Brandt Professional Agriculture
32	Kyle Larson	Turner Scott Motorsports	Chevrolet	Clear Men Scalp Therapy
33	Ty Dillon	Richard Childress Racing	Chevrolet	WESCO International
40	Josh Wise	The Motorsports Group	Chevrolet	The Motorsports Group
42	J. J. Yeley*	The Motorsports Group	Chevrolet	The Motorsports Group
43	Reed Sorenson	Richard Petty Motorsports	Ford	Pilot Flying J
44	Hal Martin	TriStar Motorsports	Toyota	American Custom Yachts
46	Chase Miller	The Motorsports Group	Chevrolet	The Motorsports Group
51	Ryan Sieg	Jeremy Clements Racing	Chevrolet	Jeremy Clements Racing
52	Joey Gase	Jimmy Means Racing	Chevrolet	Donate Life Nevada
54	Kyle Busch	Joe Gibbs Racing	Toyota	Monster Energy
55	Jamie Dick	Viva Motorsports	Chevrolet	Viva Motorsports
60	Travis Pastrana	Roush Fenway Racing	Ford	Roush Fenway Racing
70	Johanna Long	ML Motorsports	Chevrolet	Foretravel Motorcoach
74	Kevin Lepage	Mike Harmon Racing	Chevrolet	Mike Harmon Racing
77	Parker Kligerman	Kyle Busch Motorsports	Toyota	Toyota "Let's Go Places"
79	Jeffrey Earnhardt	Go Green Racing	Ford	Uponor Plumbing Systems, reload.biz
87	Joe Nemechek	NEMCO Motorsports	Toyota	AM/FM Energy Wood & Pellet Stoves
88	Dale Earnhardt Jr.	JR Motorsports	Chevrolet	TaxSlayer
92	Dexter Stacey	KH Motorsports	Ford	Maddie's Place Rocks
98	Kevin Swindell	Biagi-DenBeste Racing	Ford	Carroll Shelby Engine
99	Alex Bowman	RAB Racing	Toyota	St. Jude Children's Research Hospital, Port of Tucson
Official entry list

*When Chase Miller failed to qualify, Miller would replace Yeley for the race.

== Practice ==
Originally, three practice sessions were scheduled to be held, with two on Friday and one on Saturday. However, persistent rain on Friday would cancel all activities for Friday. Instead of qualifying on Saturday, a lone practice session was held on Saturday so that drivers could practice.

The only practice session was delayed for over 40 minutes but was eventually held on Saturday, March 9, at 9:30 AM PST. Austin Dillon of Richard Childress Racing would set the fastest time in the session, with a lap of 30.059 and an average speed of 179.647 miles per hour (289.114 km/h).

Pos.	#	Driver	Team	Make	Time	Speed
1	3	Austin Dillon	Richard Childress Racing	Chevrolet	30.059	179.647
2	20	Brian Vickers	Joe Gibbs Racing	Toyota	30.082	179.509
3	12	Sam Hornish Jr.	Penske Racing	Ford	30.115	179.313
Full practice results

== Starting lineup ==
Qualifying was originally going to be held on Saturday, March 9, but was canceled due to persistent rain that canceled Friday's activities. As a result, NASCAR set the starting lineup by last year's owner's points for the first 36 spots, and the last four spots were determined by number of attempts made within the 2013 season.

Brian Vickers of Joe Gibbs Racing would earn the pole.

=== Full starting lineup ===
Pos.	#	Driver	Team	Make
1	20	Brian Vickers	Joe Gibbs Racing	Toyota
2	6	Trevor Bayne	Roush Fenway Racing	Ford
3	2	Brian Scott	Richard Childress Racing	Chevrolet
4	3	Austin Dillon	Richard Childress Racing	Chevrolet
5	33	Ty Dillon	Richard Childress Racing	Chevrolet
6	22	Brad Keselowski	Penske Racing	Ford
7	12	Sam Hornish Jr.	Penske Racing	Ford
8	77	Parker Kligerman	Kyle Busch Motorsports	Toyota
9	43	Reed Sorenson	Richard Petty Motorsports	Ford
10	31	Justin Allgaier	Turner Scott Motorsports	Chevrolet
11	30	Nelson Piquet Jr.	Turner Scott Motorsports	Chevrolet
12	7	Regan Smith	JR Motorsports	Chevrolet
13	32	Kyle Larson	Turner Scott Motorsports	Chevrolet
14	44	Hal Martin	TriStar Motorsports	Toyota
15	11	Elliott Sadler	Joe Gibbs Racing	Toyota
16	87	Joe Nemechek	NEMCO Motorsports	Toyota
17	5	Brad Sweet	JR Motorsports	Chevrolet
18	99	Alex Bowman	RAB Racing	Toyota
19	01	Mike Wallace	JD Motorsports	Chevrolet
20	19	Mike Bliss	TriStar Motorsports	Toyota
21	51	Ryan Sieg	Jeremy Clements Racing	Chevrolet
22	24	Blake Koch	SR² Motorsports	Toyota
23	54	Kyle Busch	Joe Gibbs Racing	Toyota
24	14	Eric McClure	TriStar Motorsports	Toyota
25	4	Daryl Harr	JD Motorsports	Chevrolet
26	40	Josh Wise	The Motorsports Group	Chevrolet
27	70	Johanna Long	ML Motorsports	Chevrolet
28	00	Jason White	SR² Motorsports	Toyota
29	23	Robert Richardson Jr.	R3 Motorsports	Chevrolet
30	15	Juan Carlos Blum	Rick Ware Racing	Ford
31	60	Travis Pastrana	Roush Fenway Racing	Ford
32	88	Dale Earnhardt Jr.	JR Motorsports	Chevrolet
Champion's Provisional
33	10	Jeff Green	TriStar Motorsports	Toyota
Qualified by 2013 owner's points
34	79	Jeffrey Earnhardt	Go Green Racing	Ford
35	74	Kevin Lepage	Mike Harmon Racing	Chevrolet
36	55	Jamie Dick	Viva Motorsports	Chevrolet
37	92	Dexter Stacey	KH Motorsports	Ford
38	52	Joey Gase	Jimmy Means Racing	Chevrolet
39	42	J. J. Yeley	The Motorsports Group	Chevrolet
40	8	Scott Lagasse Jr.	Team SLR	Chevrolet
Failed to qualify
41	46	Chase Miller	The Motorsports Group	Chevrolet
42	21	Brendan Gaughan	Richard Childress Racing	Chevrolet
43	98	Kevin Swindell	Biagi-DenBeste Racing	Ford
Official starting lineup

== Race results ==
Fin	St	#	Driver	Team	Make	Laps	Led	Status	Pts	Winnings
1	7	12	Sam Hornish Jr.	Penske Racing	Ford	200	114	running	48	$98,520
2	23	54	Kyle Busch	Joe Gibbs Racing	Toyota	200	13	running	0	$60,600
3	1	20	Brian Vickers	Joe Gibbs Racing	Toyota	200	27	running	42	$45,750
4	2	6	Trevor Bayne	Roush Fenway Racing	Ford	200	21	running	41	$39,350
5	15	11	Elliott Sadler	Joe Gibbs Racing	Toyota	200	0	running	39	$34,850
6	4	3	Austin Dillon	Richard Childress Racing	Chevrolet	200	1	running	39	$34,350
7	12	7	Regan Smith	JR Motorsports	Chevrolet	200	4	running	38	$23,900
8	18	99	Alex Bowman	RAB Racing	Toyota	200	0	running	36	$30,425
9	3	2	Brian Scott	Richard Childress Racing	Chevrolet	200	0	running	35	$27,735
10	31	60	Travis Pastrana	Roush Fenway Racing	Ford	200	0	running	34	$28,350
11	5	33	Ty Dillon	Richard Childress Racing	Chevrolet	200	0	running	0	$26,625
12	17	5	Brad Sweet	JR Motorsports	Chevrolet	200	0	running	32	$26,075
13	11	30	Nelson Piquet Jr.	Turner Scott Motorsports	Chevrolet	200	0	running	31	$25,525
14	32	88	Dale Earnhardt Jr.	JR Motorsports	Chevrolet	200	0	running	0	$19,015
15	10	31	Justin Allgaier	Turner Scott Motorsports	Chevrolet	199	0	running	29	$25,330
16	9	43	Reed Sorenson	Richard Petty Motorsports	Ford	198	0	running	28	$24,545
17	20	19	Mike Bliss	TriStar Motorsports	Toyota	198	0	running	27	$24,360
18	21	51	Ryan Sieg	Jeremy Clements Racing	Chevrolet	198	0	running	0	$24,425
19	27	70	Johanna Long	ML Motorsports	Chevrolet	198	0	running	25	$24,515
20	40	8	Scott Lagasse Jr.	Team SLR	Chevrolet	198	0	running	24	$24,680
21	22	24	Blake Koch	SR² Motorsports	Toyota	198	0	running	23	$23,895
22	36	55	Jamie Dick	Viva Motorsports	Chevrolet	197	0	running	22	$17,760
23	37	92	Dexter Stacey	KH Motorsports	Ford	197	0	running	21	$17,625
24	14	44	Hal Martin	TriStar Motorsports	Toyota	197	0	running	20	$23,515
25	26	40	Josh Wise	The Motorsports Group	Chevrolet	195	0	running	19	$23,515
26	34	79	Jeffrey Earnhardt	Go Green Racing	Ford	195	1	running	19	$23,545
27	16	87	Joe Nemechek	NEMCO Motorsports	Toyota	194	0	running	17	$23,085
28	30	15	Juan Carlos Blum	Rick Ware Racing	Ford	193	0	running	16	$22,940
29	29	23	Robert Richardson Jr.	R3 Motorsports	Chevrolet	192	0	running	15	$22,790
30	8	77	Parker Kligerman	Kyle Busch Motorsports	Toyota	189	0	running	14	$22,955
31	25	4	Daryl Harr	JD Motorsports	Chevrolet	189	0	running	13	$22,525
32	13	32	Kyle Larson	Turner Scott Motorsports	Chevrolet	182	1	crash	13	$22,415
33	38	52	Joey Gase	Jimmy Means Racing	Chevrolet	181	0	crash	11	$22,300
34	19	01	Mike Wallace	JD Motorsports	Chevrolet	167	0	running	10	$22,189
35	28	00	Jason White	SR² Motorsports	Toyota	156	0	running	9	$22,080
36	35	74	Kevin Lepage	Mike Harmon Racing	Chevrolet	153	0	engine	8	$14,820
37	6	22	Brad Keselowski	Penske Racing	Ford	144	18	running	0	$14,775
38	33	10	Jeff Green	TriStar Motorsports	Toyota	16	0	vibration	6	$14,740
39	39	42	Chase Miller	The Motorsports Group	Chevrolet	5	0	vibration	5	$14,490
40	24	14	Eric McClure	TriStar Motorsports	Toyota	2	0	oil pump	4	$20,455
Failed to qualify
41		46	Chase Miller	The Motorsports Group	Chevrolet					
42		21	Brendan Gaughan	Richard Childress Racing	Chevrolet					
43		98	Kevin Swindell	Biagi-DenBeste Racing	Ford					
Official race results

Previous race: 2013 Dollar General 200	NASCAR Nationwide Series; 2013 season	Next race: 2013 Jeff Foxworthy's Grit Chips 300
