= Transport in Burundi =

There are a number of systems of transport in Burundi, including road and water-based infrastructure, the latter of which makes use of Lake Tanganyika. Furthermore, there are also some airports in Burundi.

Burundi has limited ferry services on Lake Tanganyika, few road connections to neighboring countries, no rail connections, and only one airport with a paved runway. Public transport is extremely limited and private bus companies operate buses on the route to Kigali, Uganda, Tanzania and Democratic Republic of Congo.

== Roads ==
Roads total 12,322 kilometres (7,657 mi) as of 2004. On paper, there are 90 public buses in the country but few of these are operational. Transport is extremely limited, and private bus companies operate buses on the route to Kigali, Uganda, Tanzania or the Democratic Republic of Congo.

== Waterways ==
Lake Tanganyika is used for transport, with the major port on the lake being the Port of Bujumbura. Most freight is transported down waterways.

As of May 2015, MV Mwongozo, a passenger and cargo ferry, connects Bujumbura with Kigoma in Tanzania.

== Airports and air services ==
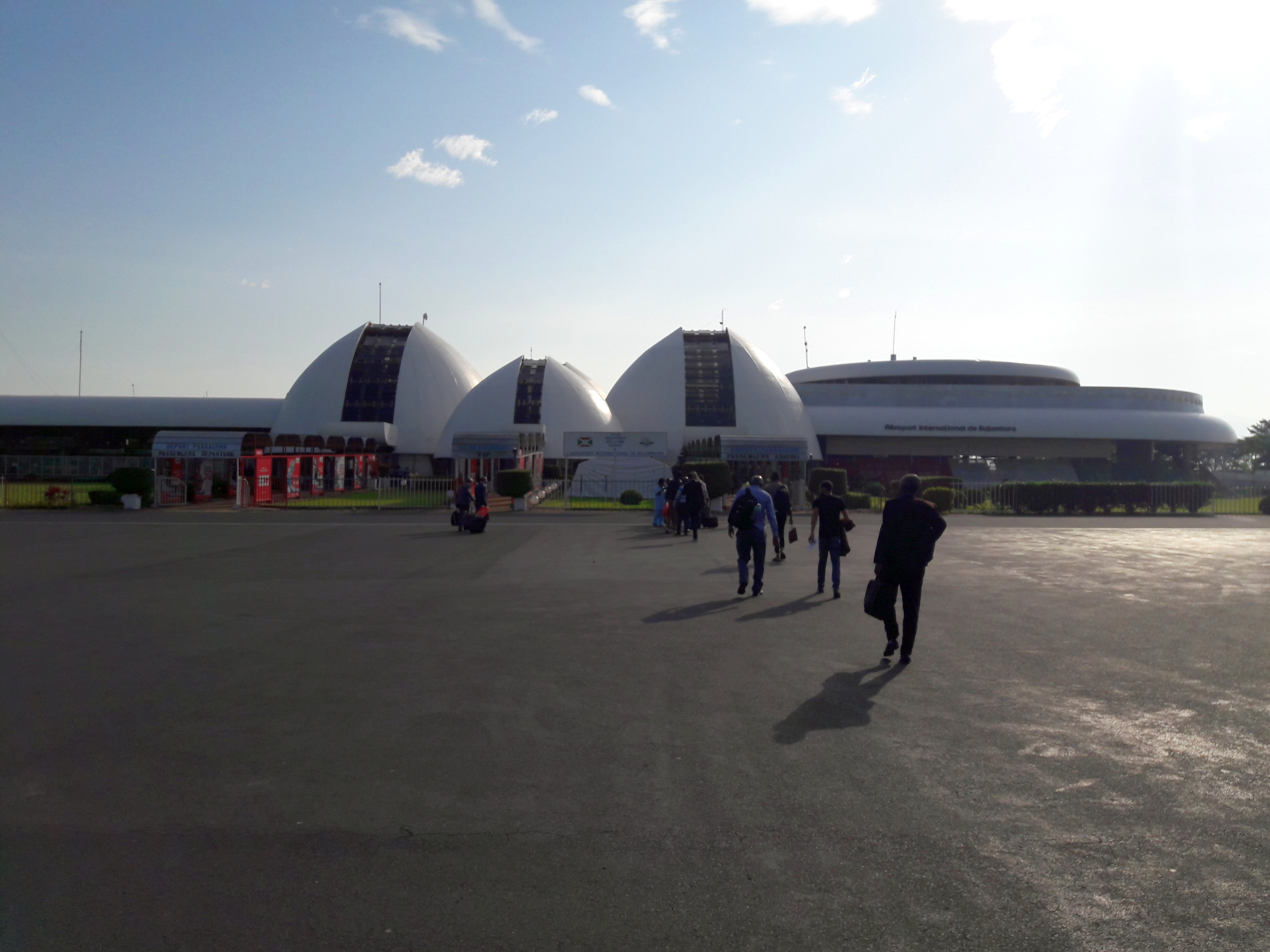
Arrival at Bujumbura International Airport

Burundi possesses eight airports, of which one has paved runways, whose length exceeds 3,047m. Bujumbura International Airport is the country's primary airport and the country's only airport with a paved runway. There are also a number of helicopter landing strips.

As of May 2015, the airlines serving Burundi are: Brussels Airlines, Ethiopian Airlines, flydubai, Kenya Airways, and RwandAir. Kigali is the city with the most daily departures.

== Railways ==
Burundi does not possess any railway infrastructure, although there are proposals to connect Burundi to its neighbours via railway.

At a meeting in August 2006 with members of the Rwanda Patriotic Front, Wu Guanzheng, of the Chinese Communist Party, confirmed the intention of China to fund a study into the feasibility of constructing a railway connecting at Isaka with the existing Tanzanian railway network, and running via Kigali in Rwanda through to Burundi. Tanzanian railways use 1,000 mm (3 ft 3 3/8 in) metre gauge, although TAZARA and other neighbouring countries, including the Democratic Republic of the Congo (DRC) use the 3 ft 6 in (1,067 mm) gauge, leading to some potential difficulties.

Another project was launched in the same year, which aims to link Burundi and Rwanda (which also has no railways) to the DRC and Zambia, and therefore to the rest of Southern Africa. At a meeting to inaugurate the Northern Corridor Transit and Transport Coordination Authority (NCTTCA), the governments of Uganda and Burundi backed the proposed new railway from the Ugandan western railhead at Kasese into the DRC.

Additionally, Burundi has been added to a planned railway project to connect Tanzania and Rwanda. In January 2022, the governments of Burundi and Tanzania announced the planned construction of an electrified standard gauge railway, which will link the two countries. The line is known as the Tanzania–Burundi Standard Gauge Railway.

=== 2013 ===
A project started in November 2013 to build a Standard Gauge line from Mombassa, Kenya, to Burundi, via Rwanda and Uganda. The main line from Mombasa will also feature branches in other directions, including Ethiopia and DR Congo.

== See also ==
- East African Railway Master Plan
