= Dry port =

Inland intermodal terminal connected by road or rail to a seaport

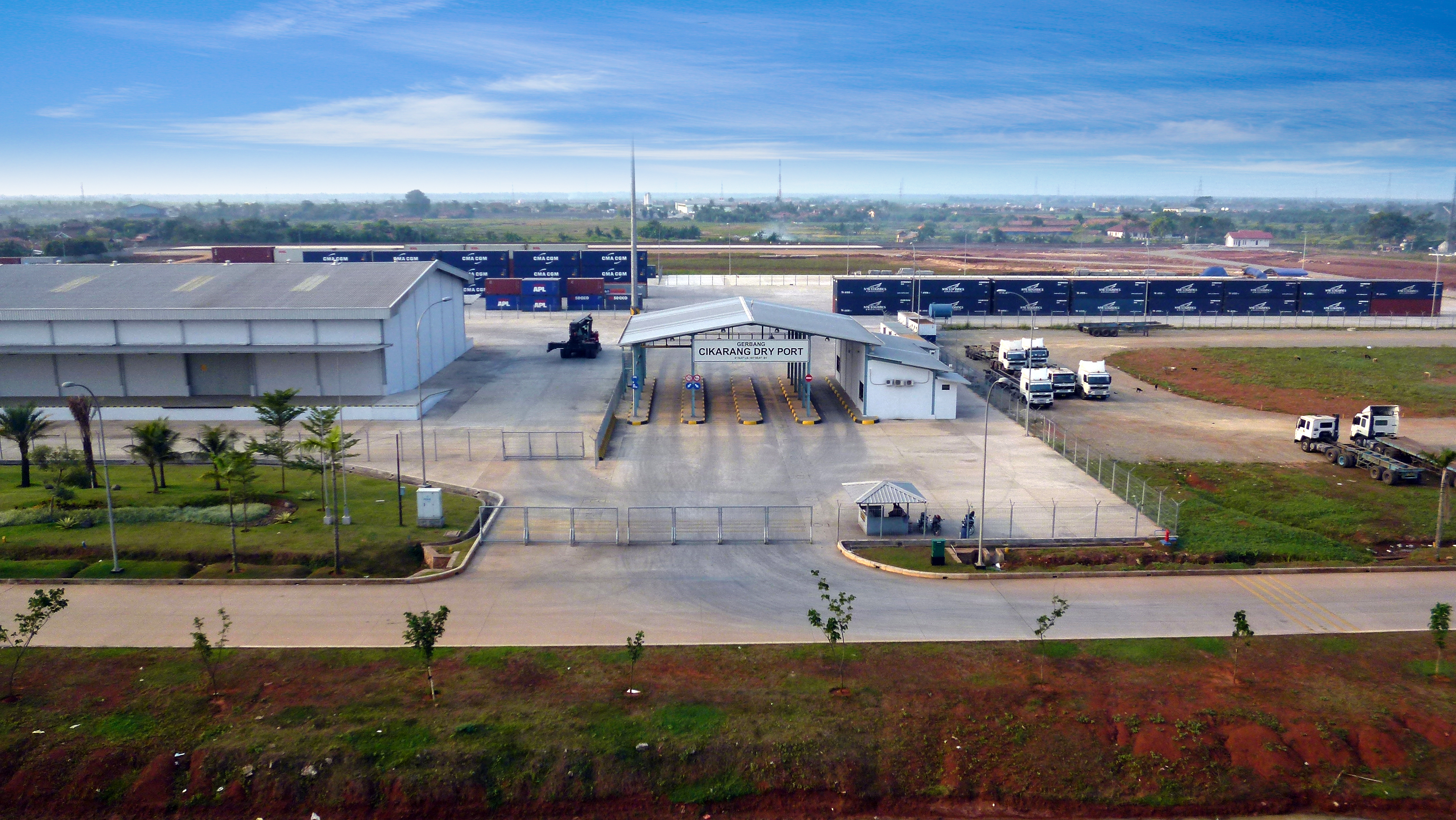
The Cikarang Dry Port in West Java, Indonesia

A dry port (sometimes referred to as an inland port) is an inland intermodal terminal directly connected by road or rail to a seaport, operating as a centre for the transshipment of sea cargo to inland destinations.

In addition to their role in cargo transshipment, dry ports may also include facilities for storage and consolidation of goods, maintenance for road or rail cargo carriers, and customs clearance services. The location of these facilities at a dry port relieves competition for storage and customs space at the seaport itself.

A dry inland port can speed up the flow of cargo between ships and major land transportation networks, creating a more central distribution point. Inland ports can improve the movement of imports and exports, moving the time-consuming sorting and processing of containers inland, away from congested seaports.

== Background ==
The term inland port is used in a narrow sense in the field of transportation systems to mean a specialized facility for intermodal containers (standardized shipping container) in international transport. Rather than goods being loaded and unloaded in such ports, shipping containers can just be transferred between ship and road vehicle or ship and train. The container may be transferred again between road and rail elsewhere and the goods are only loaded or unloaded at their point of origin or final destination.

Shipping containers allow some functions traditionally carried out at a seaport to be moved elsewhere. Examples are the functions of receiving, processing through customs, inspecting, sorting, and consolidating containers going to the same overseas port. Container transfer at the seaport can be sped up and container handling space can be reduced by transferring functions to an inland site away from the port and coast.

Distribution can also be made more efficient by setting up a link between the inland site and seaport as, say, a high-capacity rail link with a lower unit cost than sending containers individually by road. The containers are still collected from their origins or distributed to their ultimate destinations by road with the transfer happening at the inland site.

An inland port is simply such an inland site linked to a seaport. This kind of inland port does not require a waterway. Key features of an inland port are the transfer of containers between different modes of transportation (intermodal transfer) and the processing of international trade. This differentiates an inland port from a container depot or transport hub.

The term inland port may also be used for a similar model of a site linked to an airport or land border crossing rather than a seaport.

The definition of inland port in the jargon of the transportation and logistics industries is:

An inland port is a physical site located away from traditional land, air and coastal borders with the vision to facilitate and process international trade through strategic investment in multi-modal transportation assets and by promoting value-added services as goods move through the supply chain.

Inland ports may also be referred to as dry ports or intermodal hubs.

== Africa ==
- Algeria: Algiers
- Algeria: Oran (two dry ports, CMA CGM and MTA)
- Angola: Viana
- Benin: Parakou
- Democratic Republic of the Congo: Kasumbalesa Inland Port, Kasumbalesa
- Egypt: Borg El Arab dry port, New Borg El Arab, Alexandria Governorate
- Egypt: October dry port, 6th of October, Giza Governorate
- Eswatini: Matsapha Dry Port, Manzini
- Ethiopia: Dire Dawa
- Ethiopia: Mekelle
- Ethiopia: Modjo
- Ethiopia: Semera
- Ghana: Boankra Inland Port, Kumasi
- Kenya: Eldoret Inland Port, Eldoret
- Kenya: Inland Container Depot Embakasi (ICDE), Embakasi, Nairobi
- Kenya: Inland Container Depot Kisumu, Kisumu
- Kenya: Inland Container Depot Naivasha, Naivasha
- Nigeria: Funtua Inland Container Float Station, Zamfarawa, Funtua, Katsina State
- Nigeria: Heipang Inland Container Depot, Heipang, Jos, Plateau State
- Nigeria: Inland Container Depot Aba, IsialaNgwa, Aba, Abia State
- Nigeria: Inland Container Depot Ibadan, Erunmu, Ibadan, Oyo State
- Nigeria: Inland Container Depot Kano, Zawachiki, Kano State
- Nigeria: Maiduguri Inland Container Float Station, Jauri, Maiduguri, Borno State
- Nigeria: Kaduna Inland Container Depot, Kaduna, Kaduna State
- Rwanda: Masaka Inland Container Depot, Masaka, Kigali
- Somaliland: Hargeisa, Tog Wajaale, Gambadhe
- South Africa: Bayhead Inland Container Terminal, Durban, KwaZulu-Natal
- South Africa: Belcon Inland Container Terminal, Bellville, Western Cape
- South Africa: Bloemfontein Inland Container Terminal, Bloemfontein, Free State
- South Africa: City Deep Inland Container Depot, Johannesburg, Gauteng
- South Africa: Deal Party Inland Container Terminal, Deal Party, Gqeberha, Eastern Cape Province
- South Africa: Komatipoort Dry Port, Nkomazi, Mpumalanga
- South Africa: Pretcon Inland Container Terminal, Pretoria, Gauteng
- Tanzania: Isaka Inland Container Depot, Isaka, Kahama Rural District, Shinyanga Region
- Togo: Cinkasse Dry Port, Cinkassé
- Uganda: Nakawa Inland Port, Nakawa, Kampala
- Uganda: Tororo Inland Port, Tororo
- Zambia: Chipata Inland Port, Chipata, Chipata District, Eastern Province
- Zimbabwe: Mutare Dry Port, Mutare

== Asia ==
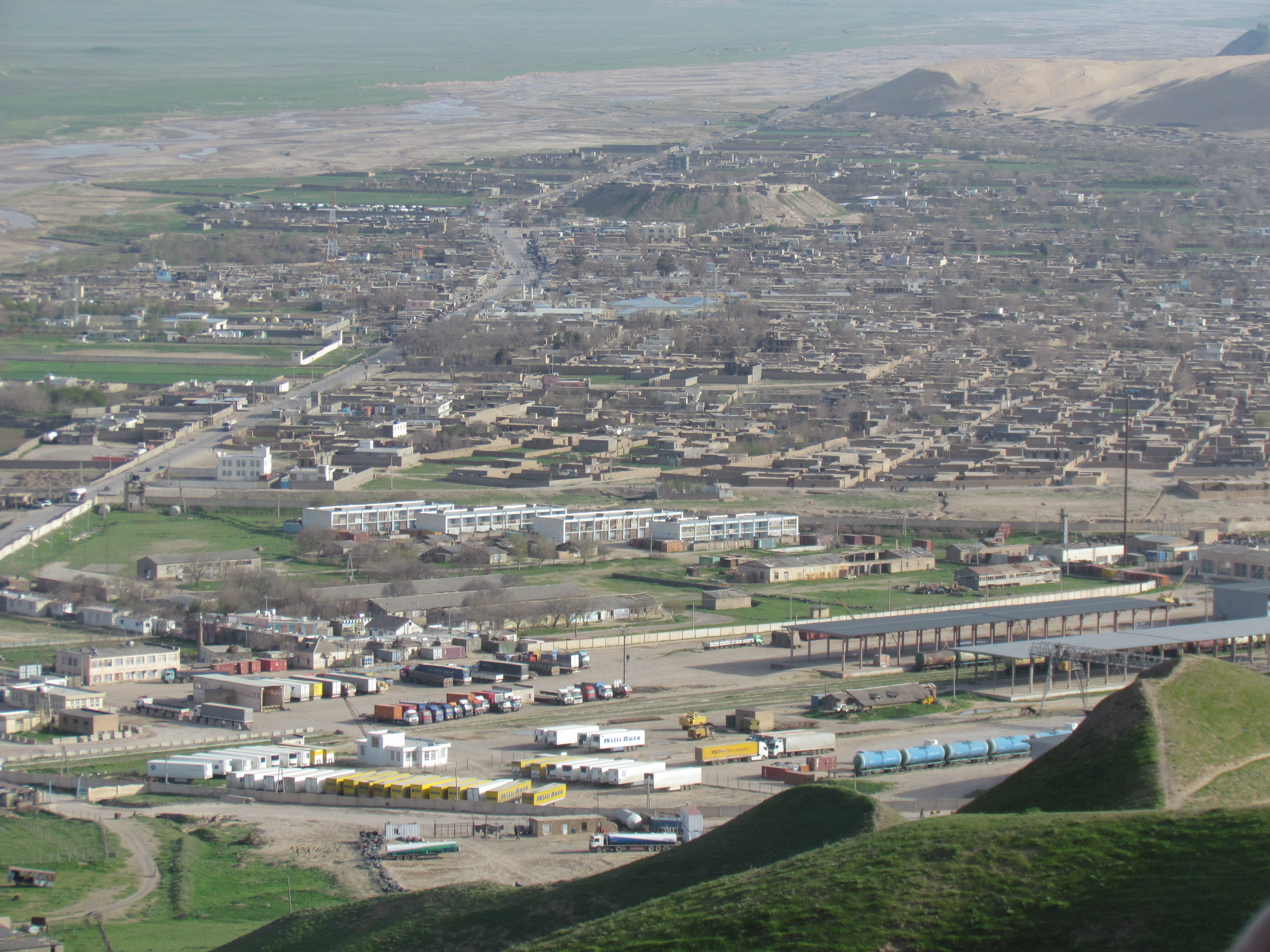
The Torghundi Inland Port in Torghundi, Afghanistan

- Afghanistan: Abresham Inland Port, Zaranj
- Afghanistan: Abu Nasir Inland Port, Shib Koh District, Farah Province
- Afghanistan: Hairatan Inland Port, Hairatan
- Afghanistan: Islam Qala Inland Port, Islam Qala
- Afghanistan: Sher Khan Inland Port, Sher Khan
- Afghanistan: Spin Boldak Inland Port, Spin Boldak
- Afghanistan: Torghundi Inland Port, Torghundi
- Afghanistan: Torkham Inland Port, Torkham
- Bangladesh: Custom House ICD, Kamalapur, Dhaka
- Bangladesh: Pangaon Inland Container Terminal, Pangaon, Chittagong
- Cambodia: Union Import, Export & Transportation and Dry Port, Phnom Penh
- China/Kazakhstan: Khorgas Inland Port, Khorgas (the dry port is 65% Chinese, 35% Kazakh)
- India: Durgapur Inland Dry Port, Durgapur, West Bengal
- India: Inland Container Depot, Garhi Harsaru (Gurugram), Haryana
- India: Inland Container Depot, Faridabad, Haryana
- India: Inland Container Depot, Hyderabad, Hyderabad
- India: Inland Container Depot, Sahnewal, Ludhiana, Punjab
- India: Inland Container Depot, Tughlakabad, New Delhi
- India: Inland Container Depot, Viramgam, Gujarat
- India: Inland Container Depot, Whitefield, Bangalore
- India: Jalna Dry Port, Maharashtra
- India: Kanpur Dry Port, Kanpur
- India: Vallarpadam Dry Port, Kochi
- India: Wardha Dry Port, Maharashtra
- Indonesia: Cikarang Dry Port, West Java
- Indonesia: Sungai Duku Port, Riau
- Indonesia: Waru Dry Port, East Java
- Iran: Tehran's rail dry port, known as Aprin
- Iran: Future logistics program village Isfahan Phase 1
- Iran: Pishgaman Dry Port, Yazd
- Nepal: Bhairahwa Inland Dry Port, Siddharthanagar
- Nepal: Biratnagar Inland Dry Port, Biratnagar
- Nepal: Birgunj Inland Dry Port, Sirsiya (Birganj)
- Nepal: Chobhar Dry Port, Kathmandu
- Nepal: Kathmandu Inland Dry Port, Kathmandu
- Nepal: Nepalgunj Inland Dry Port, Nepalgunj
- Pakistan: Faisalabad Inlnd Port, Faisalabad
- Pakistan: Hyderabad Dry Port, Hyderabad
- Pakistan: Lahore Dry Port, Lahore
- Pakistan: Larkana Dry Port, Larkana
- Pakistan: Multan Dry Port, Multan
- Pakistan: Sialkot Dry Port, Sialkot
- Saudi Arabia: Riyadh Dry Port, Riyadh
- Sri Lanka: Aitken Spence Mabole Dry Port

== Europe ==
- Belgium: Dry Port Muizen
- Ireland: Togher Inland Port, Portlaoise
- Lithuania: Kaunas Intermodal Terminal
- Lithuania: Vilnius Intermodal Terminal
- Spain: Dry Port Azuqueca de Henares
- Spain: Dry Port Madrid in Coslada
- Spain: Dry Port Santander-Ebro
- Sweden: Dry Port Hallsberg
- Sweden: Eskilstuna Dry Port
- Sweden: Nässjö Dry Port

== North America ==
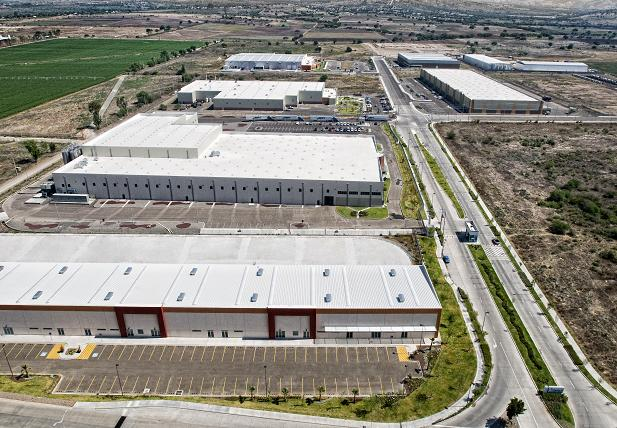
Guanajuato Inland Port, Silao, Guanajuato, Mexico

- Canada: Ashcroft Terminal, Ashcroft, British Columbia
- Canada: CentrePort Canada, Winnipeg, Manitoba
- Canada: Global Transportation Hub, Regina, Saskatchewan
- Canada: Port Alberta, Edmonton, Alberta
- Mexico: Guanajuato Inland Port, Silao, Guanajuato
- United States: CenterPoint Intermodal Center, Elwood, Illinois
- United States: Charlotte Inland Terminal, Charlotte, North Carolina
- United States: Greer Inland Port, Greer, South Carolina
- United States: Martinsburg Inland Port, Martinsburg, West Virginia
- United States: Piedmont Triad Inland Terminal, Greensboro, North Carolina
- United States: Port of Memphis, Memphis, Tennessee
- United States: Port of Tucson, Tucson, Arizona
- United States: Port San Antonio, San Antonio, Texas
- United States: Utah Inland Port, Salt Lake City, Utah
- United States: Virginia Inland Port, Front Royal, Virginia

== Oceania ==
- Australia: Alice Springs Intermodal Terminal, Alice Springs, Northern Territory
- Australia: Altona Inland Port, Altona, Victoria
- Australia: Brighton Transport Hub, Hobart, Tasmania
- Australia: Ettamogah Rail Hub, Albury, New South Wales
- Australia: Kewdale Freight Terminal, Kewdale, Western Australia
- Australia: Minto Inland Port, Minto, New South Wales
- Australia: Moorebank Intermodal Terminal, Moorebank, New South Wales
- Australia: Penfield Intermodal Freight Centre, Penfield, South Australia
- Australia: Riverina Intermodal Freight & Logistics Hub, Bomen, New South Wales
- Australia: Shepparton Intermodal Terminal, Shepparton, Victoria
- Australia: Somerton Multi-Modal Freight Terminal, Somerton, Victoria
- Australia: Warrnambool Intermodal Terminal, Warrnambool, Victoria
- Australia: Wimmera Intermodal Freight Terminal, Dooen, Victoria
- New Zealand: Metroport Inland Port, Onehunga, Auckland
- New Zealand: MidlandPort at Rolleston, Christchurch
- New Zealand: Ruakura Inland Port, Hamilton
- New Zealand: Wiri Inland Port, Auckland, New Zealand

== South America ==
- Brazil: Porto Seco Centro Oeste Dry Port, Brasília (Federal District)
- Chile: Los Andes Dry Port, Los Andes
- Colombia: Bogotá Celta Dry Port, Bogotá (Capital District)
- Uruguay: APM Terminals Uruguay, Montevideo

== See also ==
- Intergovernmental Agreement on Dry Ports
- Intermodal freight transport
