= Uganda Standard Gauge Railway =

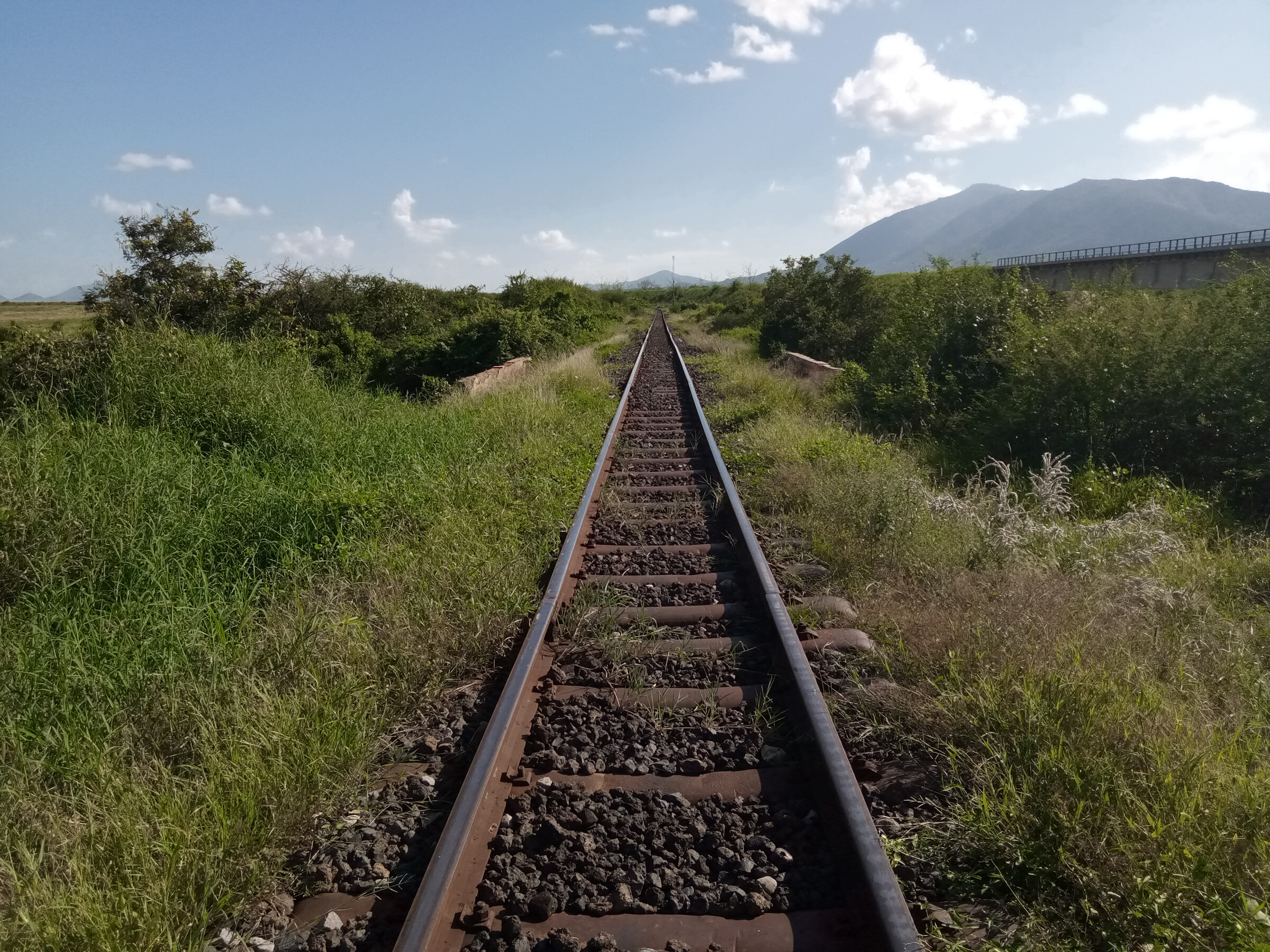
- The guard rails seen on the right hand side of the picture are of the newer Standard-gauge railway (SGR) line that runs parallel to the old railway line all the way from Mombasa to Nairobi

Overview
- Status: Planned
- Termini: Malaba, Kampala; Mpondwe, Mirama Hills, Goli and Elegu

Service
- Type: Heavy rail
- Operator(s): Uganda Railways Corporation

History
- Opened: 2025 (Expected)

Technical
- Line length: 1,724 km (1,071 mi)
- Track gauge: 1,435 mm (4 ft 8 1/2 in) standard gauge

The Uganda Standard Gauge Railway is a planned railway system linking the country to the neighboring countries of Kenya, Rwanda, Democratic Republic of the Congo and South Sudan, as part of the East African Railway Master Plan. The new standard-gauge railway (SGR) is intended to replace the old, inefficient metre-gauge railway system. The entire 1,724 kilometres (1,071 mi) SGR in Uganda will cost an estimated $12.8 billion.

== Overview ==
This 1435 mm (4 ft 8 1/2 in) railway line is intended to ease the transfer of goods between the port of Mombasa and the Ugandan capital of Kampala, and subsequently to Kigali in Rwanda, and to Beni in the Democratic Republic of the Congo and to Nimule and Juba in South Sudan. Goods would travel from Mombasa along the Kenya Standard Gauge Railway to Malaba, at the border with Uganda, and transfer onto this railway system.

In April 2017, preliminary estimates for the entire Uganda SGR Project were quoted at USh 45.6 trillion (approximately US$12.8 billion).

In March 2019, during a state visit to Kenya, President Yoweri Museveni of Uganda and his host, President Uhuru Kenyatta of Kenya, jointly publicly committed to extend the Kenyan Standard Gauge Railway to Uganda. Completing the critical missing link to the Kenyan SGR would then unlock the funding for Uganda’s Malaba–Kampala line. As of October 2023, the Naivasha–Malaba section of Kenya's SGR has not been constructed.

== Location ==
The railway system would consist of four major sections:

Malaba–Kampala Section

Also referred to as the Eastern Line, this section will stretch from the border with Kenya at Malaba, through Tororo and Jinja, to end at Kampala. The distance of this section is approximately 219 kilometres (136 mi). The entire Malaba–Kampala section, measuring 273 kilometres (170 mi) with associated train stations and railway yards, is budgeted to cost US$2.3 billion. Once funding is secured, the construction of the Eastern Line is expected to last 42 months.

In October 2024 the government of Uganda signed an agreement with Yapi Merkezi Construction Group to construct the 272 kilometres (169 mi) Malaba-Kampala section for €270 million (US$300 million or UGX10.8 trillion). work is planned to take 48 months from start to finish. Funding is expected to be provided by international development partners and the Ugandan government.

Tororo–Gulu Section

Also referred to as the Northern Line, this section will extend from Tororo, through Mbale and Lira to Gulu, a distance of approximately 367 kilometres (228 mi). From Gulu, one spur will continue north to Elegu and on to Nimule and Juba in South Sudan. The section in Uganda measures approximately 106 kilometres (66 mi). Another extension stretches from Gulu southwestwards through Pakwach to end at Goli at the Border with the Democratic Republic of the Congo, a distance of approximately 187 kilometres (116 mi).

Kampala–Mpondwe Section

This is referred to as the Western Line. It will start in Kampala and pass through Bihanga in Ibanda District, continuing on to Mpondwe at the border with DR Congo, a distance of about 430 kilometres (267 mi).

Bihanga–Mirama Hills Section

This is also referred to as the Southwestern Line. It will stretch from Bihanga through Ibanda and Mbarara to end at Mirama Hills, at the border with Rwanda, a distance of about 191 kilometres (119 mi).

== Developments ==
The construction was expected to be financed by the government of Uganda, using borrowed money from the Exim Bank of China. However, the lender has been unwilling to approve the loan until Kenya finalizes the funding arrangement for the Naivasha–Kisumu–Malaba section of its SGR.

In January 2023, the Ugandan government terminated the contract that it had signed with China Harbour Engineering Company (CHEC) to build the Kampala–Malaba section of the Ugandan SGR, on account of "failure to execute" for eight consecutive years.

In May 2023, the government identified Yapı Merkezi Group from Turkey as the new engineering, procurement and construction (EPC) contractor. Funding is expected to be sourced from European banks. Works are expected to commence in 2024 starting with the 273 kilometres (170 mi) Kampala–Malaba section. The funding bank was later identified as Standard Chartered Plc of the United Kingdom.

In July 2023, the Ugandan and Kenyan cabinet ministers of transportation met in Mombasa. The communique issued at the end of the two-day consultations announced that going forward, the two countries will jointly explore funding sourcing for the Naivasha–Kisumu–Malaba portion of the Kenya Standard Gauge Railway. Together, the two countries are seeking at least $6 billion in new funding for their SGR projects from financiers in Europe and the Middle East.

In February 2024, both countries reaffirmed their commitments to build the Naivasha-Kisumu-Malaba section in Kenya and the Malaba-Kampala section in Uganda, starting in 2024. The Ugandan government has contracted the Yapı Merkezi Group from Turkey to build the 273 kilometres (170 mi) section between Malaba and Kampala at a contract price of US$2.9 billion. Work was expected to start in August 2024. As of August 2024, the Uganda government was working on finalizing the engineering, procurement and construction (EPC) documentation and obtaining approvals from relevant government bureaucrats. The construction distance from Malaba to Kampala is now reported as 332 kilometres (206 mi). Construction is expected to begin in H2 2024.

On 14 October 2024, the government of Uganda signed the EPC documents with Yapı Merkezi to build the Malaba-Kampala section of the Uganda Standard Gauge Railway at a contract price of €2.7 billion (approx. USh10.8 trillion). Construction is expected to take four years and conclude in H2 2028.

== See also ==
- Standard-gauge railway
- Isaka–Kigali Standard Gauge Railway
- Rwanda Standard Gauge Railway
- Northern Corridor
