= Silao, Guanajuato =

Coordinates: 20°57′N 101°25′W

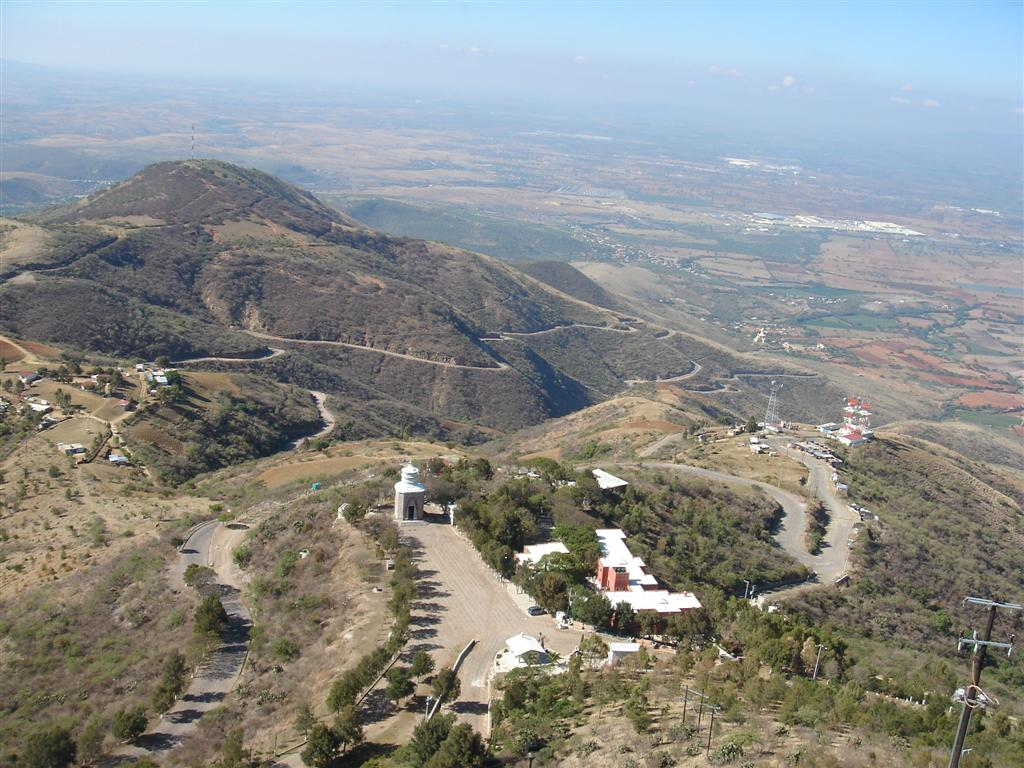
A panoramic view of Silao in June 2008

Silao is a municipality in the west-central part of the state of Guanajuato in Mexico. Its seat is the city of the same name.

This municipality lies adjacent to the west side of the municipality of Guanajuato, the state capital. This municipality has an area of 531.41 km² (205.18 sq mi) and a population of 147,123, and includes numerous small outlying communities, the largest of which are Colonias Nuevo México and La Aldea.

The municipal president Is Carlos garcia villaseñor of Morena Party

Silao is home to the Guanajuato Inland Port transshipment facility.

General Motors and Volkswagen have production plants in this city. Also the Bajío International Airport is located in Silao.

== History ==
Silao was the scene of the Battle of Silao in 1860 during the Reform War.

General Motors temporarily laid off 6,000 workers at its plant in October 2019 due to the strike in the United States.
