= Riyadh Dry Port =

Dry port in as-Sinaiyah, Riyadh, Saudi Arabia

- Interactive map of Riyadh Dry Port

Location
- Location: As-Sinaiyah, Riyadh, Saudi Arabia

Details
- Built: 1982
- Operated by: SGP Riyadh; Saudi Railways Organization
- Size: 918,639 m^{2}
- Rail lines: SRO Cargo line

Statistics
- Annual TEU: 500,000 (2013)

Riyadh Dry Port is a dry port in the as-Sinaiyah neighborhood of Riyadh, Saudi Arabia. It is the largest inland port in Saudi Arabia. The port is located on off Exit 16 in Al Malaz, adjacent to the Riyadh railway station. Riyadh Dry Port covers an area of 918,639 m^{2} and accommodates six 6,480 m^{2} warehouses.

The port handled 250,000 TEU in 2003, and 500,000 TEU in 2013, recording an 18% growth from 2012. Riyadh Dry Port handled 26,000 TEU in May 2013, and 30,749 TEU in May 2014. On 5 June 2014, handled a record 987 containers in a single day.

== History ==
Riyadh Dry Port was established in 1982. The port was initially operated by the Saudi Railways Organization (SRO), which also operates the cargo line and manages empty container yards in Dammam. SRO later decided to privatize the port's operations. BAAS International Group (BIG) won a 10-year contract to handle operations at Riyadh Dry Port in 2011.

In May 2012, Musaid Al-Sayyari, the Head of the National Committee for Customs Clearance (NCCC) at the Council of Saudi Chambers of Commerce and Industry, stated that "poor operation of the dry port [had] caused enormous damage to the goods". Customs brokers filed complaints with the SRO regarding BIG's port operations, after the clearance of 7,000 goods faced disruptions over a 45-day period.

On 3 April 2013, Navis announced that it had completed the deployment of the Navis SPARCS N4 terminal operating system (TOS) at the port. The port also installed SAP enterprise application software making Riyadh the fifth port in the world to run a combination of the SPARCS N4 V2.2, XPS and ECN4 NAVIS modules.

In December 2016, customs authorities discovered nearly 5 kg of hashish hidden inside a consignment at the port.

== See also ==
- Transport in Saudi Arabia
