= Guanajuato Inland Port =

GTO Inland Port
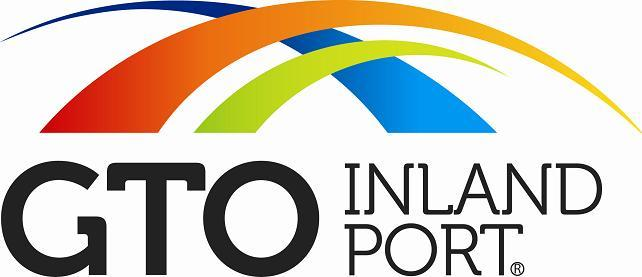
- Founded: 2006
- Headquarters: Silao, Guanajuato, Mexico
- Key people: Jorge Arturo Acevedo Alarid (CEO)
- Website: www.puertointerior.com.mx

Located at the center of Mexico, Guanajuato Inland Port or GTO Inland Port is a dry port facility in Guanajuato, Mexico.

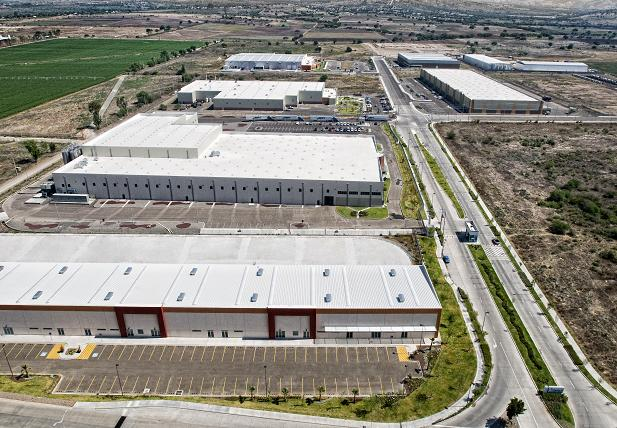
Santa Fe Industrial Parks

The Guanajato are primarily Industrial Parks. Santa Fe I and II were designed and built in partnership with a Mexican industrial developer. It offers land for manufacturing and logistic operations.

In the last months, several foreign and domestic companies have set up operations in the Santa Fe Industrial Park. Such companies include Hino Motors (a Toyota company), Guala Dispensing, Mailhot, Samot, Teco Westinghouse, Softer, Hiroshima Aluminum, Volkswagen, Pirelli, Flexi, and Emyco. There is a new extension, Santa Fe II Industrial Park at GTO Inland Port.

A Photovoltaic Facility will supply renewable energy to industrial plants in the complex and the region.

Adjacent to the Customs Facility is an industrial park designated by the Federal Customs Agency as a Free Trade Zone (FTZ). GTO Inland Port’s FTZ is a new in-bond federal program that is designed for manufacturing and logistic companies which use foreign raw materials and components in their manufacturing process and ship their final products out of Mexico.

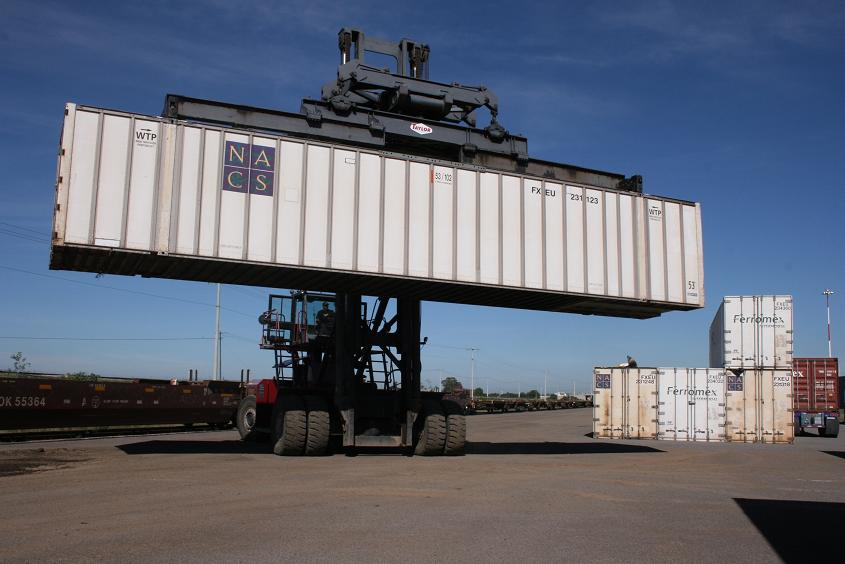
GIP's Rail Container Facility

A rail container yard is now offering inter-modal services for rail transportation. The facility is operated by the largest rail company in Mexico, Ferromex.

== Business Park ==
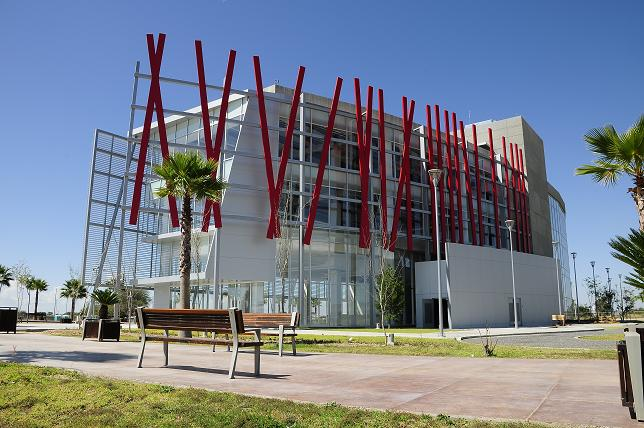
Business Park

A business park is currently under construction. Among the planned facilities for this area are two business hotels, restaurants, food courts, office space for lease, banks, convenience stores and other services.

== Community Services Area ==
A community services area was designed and built to further complement employees’ needs. This area has a child day-care facility, a medical attention facility, and a fire station. Sports and recreational facilities are in the complex as well.
