= Bihanga =

- Map of Uganda showing the location of Bihanga.
- Coordinates: 00°04′40″N 30°36′35″E
- Country: Uganda
- District: Ibanda District
- Elevation: 1,198 m (3,930 ft)
- Time zone: UTC+3 (EAT)

Bihanga is a settlement in Ibanda District in the Western Region of Uganda. It is the location of the headquarters of Bihanga Parish, Nyamarebe sub-county.

== Location ==
Bihanga is approximately 81 kilometres (50 mi), by road, north of Ibanda, the largest town in Ibanda District and the location of the district headquarters. This is about 154 kilometres (96 mi), north of Mbarara, the largest town in the Western Region of Uganda. Bihanga is approximately 303 kilometres (188 mi), by road, southwest of Kampala, Uganda's capital and largest city.

The geographical coordinates of Bihanga are:0°04'40.0"N, 30°36'35.0"E (latitude:0.077778; longitude:30.609722). The settlement is located at an average elevation of 1,198 metres (3,930 ft), above sea level.

== Overview ==
Bihanga lies on the old, dysfunctional metre-gauge railway, from Kampala to Kasese, that was built by the British colonialists in the 1950s. The location is also on the plans for the planned Uganda Standard Gauge Railway (Uganda SGR). The Kampala–Mpondwe Section or the Western Line of the Uganda SGR, intersects with the Bihanga–Mirama Hills Section or the Southwestern Line of the Uganda SGR, at Bihanga.

Bihanga is also the location of Bihanga Military Training School, one of the military schools in Uganda, owned and operated by the Uganda People's Defense Force.

Bihanga is located near Rwamwanja Refugee Settlement, approximately 13 kilometres (8 mi), by road, north of town. The town is served by Rwamwanja Health Centre III, administered by the Ibanda District Administration.

Other points of interest nearby, include: (a) Katonga Wildlife Reserve and (b) Katonga River, as it flows westwards from the game reserve into Lake George.

As part of Bihanga Military Training School (Bihanga Training Camp), the European Union built Bihanga Airfield, a combined military and civilian airstrip for use by the military and by local administrators. The airstrip can be clearly seen on this map, south of the red arrow.

== See also ==
- Kamwenge
- Kiruhura
