= Isaka–Kigali Standard Gauge Railway =

Overview
- Status: Planned
- Termini: Isaka, Tanzania; Kigali, Rwanda

Service
- Type: Heavy rail
- Operator: Tanzania–Rwanda Railway Authority

History
- Opened: 2022 (Expected)

Technical
- Line length: 571 km (355 mi)
- Track gauge: 1,435 mm (4 ft 8 1/2 in) standard gauge
- Electrification: 25 kV 50 Hz AC overhead catenary (planned)

The Isaka–Kigali Standard Gauge Railway is a planned railway line linking the town of Isaka in Tanzania to the city of Kigali in Rwanda.

== Location ==
The railway line would start at the inland container depot (ICD) at Isaka, in the Kahama Rural District of Shinyanga Region, in Tanzania. The line would travel in a general northwesterly direction to the border town of Rusumo, Rwanda, in Kirehe District in the Eastern Province of Rwanda. From here the line would continue westward, through Rwanda, to end at Kigali, the capital and largest city of the country. The total length of the railway line is estimated at about 571 kilometres (355 mi).

== Overview ==
This 1435 mm (4 ft 8 1/2 in) railway line is intended to ease the transfer of goods between the port of Dar es Salaam and the city of Kigali, and subsequently to Bujumbura in Burundi and to Goma in the Democratic Republic of the Congo. Goods would either travel to Isaka from Dar es Salaam on the existing narrow-gauge railway line, or on the Dar es Salaam–Mwanza Standard Gauge Railway when completed. After offloading at the existing internal container depot (ICD) at Isaka, the goods would be loaded on this standard gauge railway line for transport to Kigali. The line is part of the wider East African Railway Master Plan.

== Construction ==
The construction is expected to be financed jointly by the governments of Tanzania and Rwanda. As of January 2018, the feasibility studies for this project have been concluded.

Construction is expected to start in October 2018 at an estimated total cost of US$2.5 billion. The Isaka–Rusumo section, measuring approximately 371 kilometres (231 mi) of relatively flat terrain in Tanzania, will cost a total of US$942 million. The more mountainous Rusumo–Kigali section in Rwanda, measuring approximately 150 kilometres (93 mi), will cost a total of US$847 million. Burundi has put its standard gauge railway project on hold.

In March 2018, The EastAfrican reported that both countries had agreed to change the railway design to accommodate electric locomotives which are faster than the original diesel-powered equipment. In April 2018, the same newspaper further reported that the World Bank had expressed its willingness to fund this project.

== In Rwanda ==
In January 2018, the government of Rwanda allocated space in Ndera, approximately 20.5 kilometres (13 mi), by road, east of Kigali city center, on which the passenger terminal of the SGR will be built. The cargo terminal will be built in Masaka, another neighborhood, approximately 17 kilometres (11 mi), by road, south-east of the central business district of Kigali City. Rwanda has plans to extend the SGR to Bugesera International Airport.

In December 2018, the New Times newspaper reported that the budgeted cost for the Rwanda section had increased to US$1.3 billion.

== In Tanzania ==
The standard gauge railway from Dar es Salaam to Mwanza is being built in sections. The Dar es Salaam to Morogoro section is under construction. In September 2017, a firm from Turkey was awarded a second contract worth US$1.92 billion to construct the line between Morogoro and Makutupora. The government of Tanzania has advertised for designing and building services for the Makutupora-Tabora-Isaka-Mwanza sections of the railway line. In July 2018, the Trade and Development Bank pledged to lend US$200 million towards the establishment of the "Central Tanzania Standard Gauge Railway Line".

== See also ==
- Standard-gauge railway
- Uganda Standard Gauge Railway
- Rwanda Standard Gauge Railway
- East African Railway Master Plan
