= Nairobi–Addis Ababa Railway =

Planned railway in Kenya and Ethiopia

The Nairobi-Addis Ababa Railway is an upcoming Standard Gauge Railway in Kenya and Ethiopia under the LAPSSET project. Conceptualized in 1975, LAPSSET was launched in 2009 under President Mwai Kibaki as part of Kenya's Vision 2030. It is also part of the East African Railway Masterplan.

Kenya and Ethiopia signed an agreement to build the 3000 km LAPSSET railway at a cost of USD 13.8 billion in September 2023. In addition to connecting the capital cities of the two countries, Addis Ababa and Nairobi with a Standard Gauge Railway, it will also connect Ethiopia to the Lamu Port via the railway link from Isiolo to Lamu.
