= Kenya Standard Gauge Railway =

Railway system

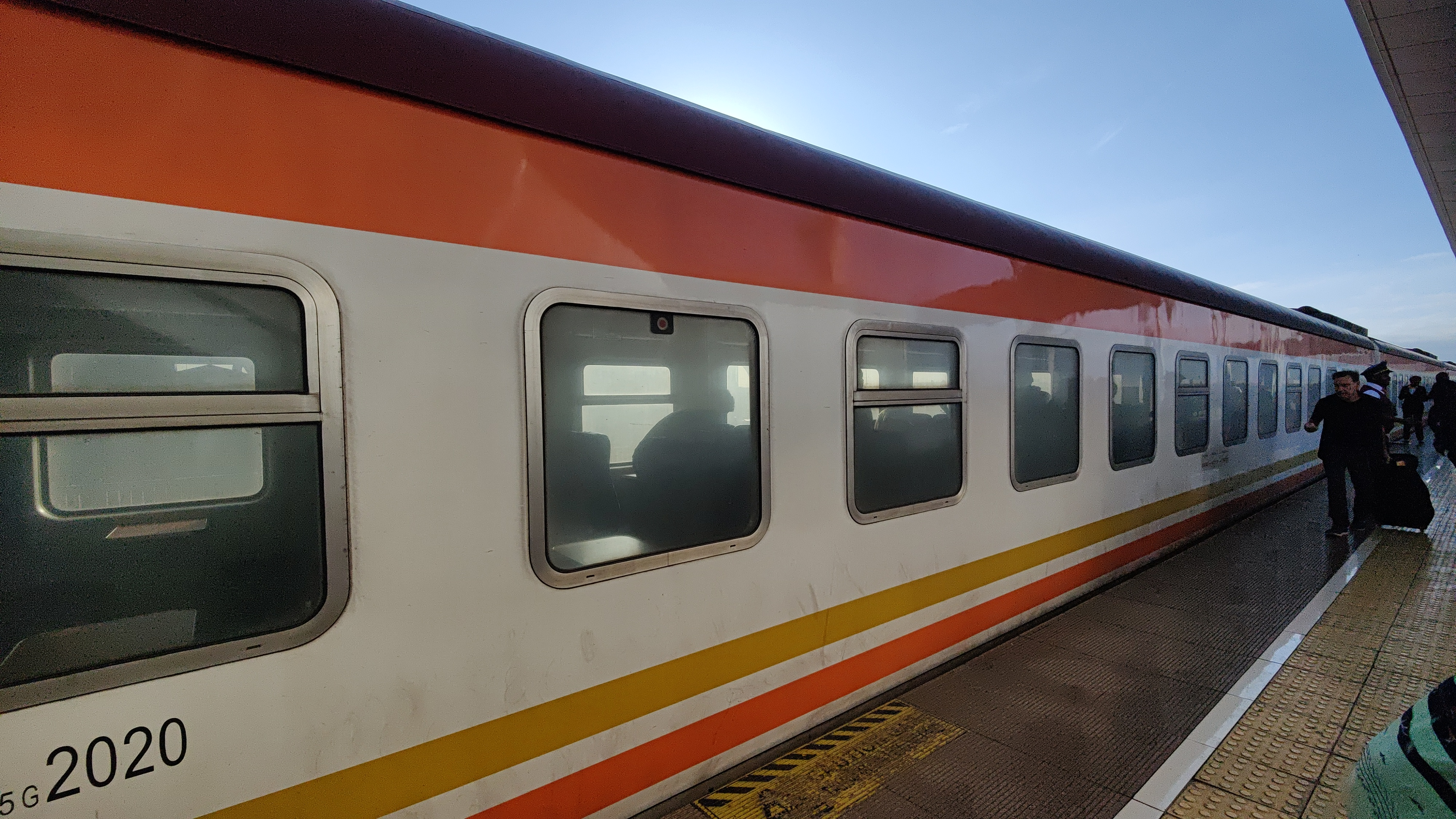
- A train at Nairobi Terminus railway station

Overview
- Status: Phase 1 & 2A Completed. Phase 2B & 2C Under construction
- Termini: Mombasa

Service
- Type: Heavy rail
- Operator: Kenya Railways Corporation

History
- Opened: 2017

Technical
- Line length: 3,800 km (2,400 mi)
- Track gauge: 1,435 mm (4 ft 8 1/2 in) standard gauge

The Kenya Standard Gauge Railway (SGR) is a partially finished railway system connecting Kenya's cities. Once completed, it will link Kenya to neighboring Uganda, and through Uganda, to South Sudan, the Democratic Republic of the Congo, Rwanda, and Burundi. There are also plans to link to Addis Ababa, in neighboring Ethiopia to the north. The first segment, between Mombasa and Nairobi, opened passenger rail service in June 2017, and freight rail service in January 2018. Other segments are under construction or planned. The new standard gauge railway is intended to replace the old, inefficient metre-gauge railway system.

== Location ==
The railway system consists of several major sections:

Mombasa–Nairobi Section (Phase 1)

This section, measuring 609 kilometres (378 mi), is known as the Mombasa–Nairobi Standard Gauge Railway, and connects the port city of Mombasa and Nairobi, the capital and largest city of Kenya. Passenger rail services between Mombasa and Nairobi started on 1 June 2017, and freight rail services on 1 January 2018.

It was built between October 2016 and January 2018, by China Road and Bridge Corporation, at a cost of US$3.6 billion, 90 per cent of which was borrowed from the Exim Bank of China, with the Kenyan government providing the remaining 10 per cent.

Nairobi–Naivasha Section (Phase 2a)

This section was also contracted to the company that constructed the Mombasa–Nairobi Section. The line stretches from Nairobi to Naivasha, a distance of about 120 kilometres (75 mi), at cost of KSh. 150 billion (US$1.5 billion), borrowed from the China Export-Import Bank. Construction began in 2018 and the line was officially opened for passenger train service in October 2019. International freight for neighbouring countries interchanges at the Naivasha Inland Container Depot.

Naivasha–Kisumu Section (Phase 2B)

This section, measuring 267 kilometres (166 mi), stretching from Naivasha to Kisumu, on the eastern shores of Lake Victoria, is contracted to China Communications Construction Company, at a budgeted cost of KSh. 380 billion (US$3.8 billion), borrowed from China Exim Bank. Loan papers between Kenya and China were scheduled for signatures in September 2018, but were deferred until a commercial viability study is conducted on the entire Mombasa–Kisumu railway.. Construction of phase 2B was launched in March 2026 near Suswa, at terminus of the current railway.

Kisumu–Malaba Section (Phase 2C)

This section, measuring approximately 135 kilometres (84 mi), takes the SGR line to the town of Malaba, at the international border with Uganda. CCCC, is the contractor for this section as well. The contract price for this section is about KSh. 169 billion (US$1.69 billion). The price for the Naivasha–Kisumu–Malaba section is KSh. 549 billion (US$5.49 billion) and includes the laying of railway tracks in both sections, dredging and expansion of the port of Kisumu, and the expansion and modernization of the inland container depot at Embakasi, in Nairobi. In May 2024, the Exim Bank of China indicated willingness to fund the extension of the SGR to the Ugandan border at Malaba. Construction of phase 2C was launched in March 2026 in Kisumu, with the Presidents of both Kenya & Uganda in attendance.

Lamu–Lokichar-Nakodok Section

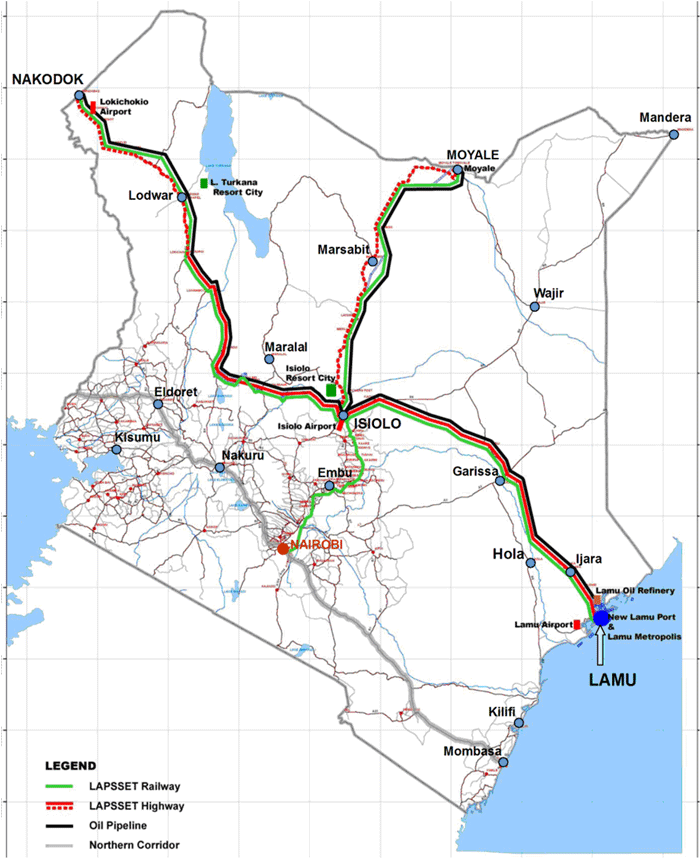
Map showing the scope of the LAPSSET Project within Kenya

This railway line, totaling 1,500 kilometres (932 mi), is a component of the Lamu Port and Lamu-Southern Sudan-Ethiopia Transport Corridor (LAPSSET) development project. Under the LAPSSET plan, this line would be extended to Juba in South Sudan.

Nairobi–Moyale Section

This 700 kilometres (435 mi) section also falls under the LAPSSET program. It extends from Nairobi to Moyale, at the international border with Kenya's northern neighbor. It is planned to be extended to Addis Ababa, the capital city of Ethiopia. In January 2024, Kenya Railways Corporation estimated the cost for this section at Ksh835.5 billion (US$5.57 billion), with the link from Nairobi to Isiolo costing Ksh358.8 billion (US$2.392 billion) and the remaining stretch to Moyale costing Ksh476.7 billion (US$3.178 billion).

Naivasha–Lokichar Section

This proposed railway link, measuring an estimated 460 kilometres (286 mi), would link the two main standard gauge railway systems in Kenya; the Mombasa–Malaba SGR System and the Lamu–Nakodok SGR System.

== Purpose, history, and operations ==
This 1435 mm (4 ft 8 1/2 in) railway line is intended to ease the transfer of goods and passengers between the port of Mombasa and the cities of Nairobi and Kisumu, in Kenya, Kampala in Uganda, Kigali in Rwanda and subsequently to Bujumbura in Burundi, Juba in South Sudan and to Goma and Bunia in the Democratic Republic of the Congo.

In March 2019, during a state visit to Kenya, President Yoweri Museveni of Uganda and his host, President Uhuru Kenyatta of Kenya, jointly, publicly committed to extend the SGR to Kampala via Malaba.

The Kenyan government in 2020 reached a deal with AfriStar to take over operations and maintenance by May 2022. Kenya received its first SGR rolling stock in May 2017: 18 locomotives and 60 double-stack container cars. In early February 2024, Kenya received a second batch of 50 cars, with an additional 250 cars to be delivered within the month. 20 of the expected wagons will have power plugins to enable the movement of refrigerated containers, while another 20 will be passenger coaches.

According to the World Bank Group, Kenya overpaid for the Mombasa-Naivasha section by Ksh 117 Billion due to fraud and uncompetitive contract awards.

== Beyond Kenya ==
Originally envisioned to extend to Kisangani, in line with the East Africa Railway Masterplan, the SGR project ran into political and financial hurdles, caused by Uganda's initial wait-and-see approach, and Chinese hesitance to fund the Naivasha-Kisumu, Kisumu-Malaba, and Malaba-Kampala sections due to economic slowdown. Since 2023, Kenya and Uganda have embarked on a joint initiative to fund the completion of the SGR to Kampala, with Kenya announcing the commencement of works on the Naivasha-Kisumu section in 2024.

In May 2024, Rwanda and the Democratic Republic of the Congo committed to join the Kenyan-Ugandan initiative and funding drive, with an aim to extend the SGR to Kigali and Kisangani.

== Standards ==
The lines are being built according to Chinese standards.

- Gauge: Standard gauge
- Couplers: Janney AAR
- Brakes: Air
- Electrification: Overhead catenary 25 kV AC / 50 Hz (unimplemented as of 2026)
- Target speed (passenger): 120 km/h (75 mph)
- Target speed (freight): 80 km/h (50 mph)
- Maximum train load (freight): 3500±93 tonnes gross
- Designed transport capacity: 20 million tonnes annually
- Gross transport capacity: 24.9 million tonnes annually (taking double-track sections into account)
- Minimum railway curve radius: 1,200 m (3,900 ft) (800 m or 2,600 ft at difficult locations)
- Maximum (ruling) gradient: 1.85% (1 in 54)
- Length of arrival & departure track at passing loops: 850 m (2,790 ft) (dual locomotive: 880 m or 2,890 ft) [resulting max. train length ~800 m (2,600 ft)]
- Maximum vehicle loading gauge height: 5,300 mm (17 ft 4 5/8 in)
- Trains run on the: Left
- Railway signalling & train protection system: automatic block signaling & ETCS-2 SIL4
- Level crossings: permitted (no full grade separation)
- double stack ISO containers = 2 x 2.4 m (7 ft 10 1/2 in) or 2 x 2.9 m (9 ft 6 1/8 in) (unknown) on well cars.

== See also ==
- Standard-gauge railway
- Isaka–Kigali Standard Gauge Railway
