= North–South Corridor Project =

The North–South Corridor Project is a major proposal to upgrade and extend land transport links (road and rail) in Southern Africa.

== Projects ==
=== Rail ===
- TAZARA – rehabilitation
- Kapiri Mposhi – Chingola – rehabilitation
- Bulawayo – Victoria Falls – rehabilitation

== See also ==
- AfricaRail
- East African Railway Master Plan
