= Boankra Inland Port =

- Dry Port and Inland Port
- Location in Ghana
- Coordinates: 06°41′0″N 01°24′0″W
- Country: Ghana

The Boankra Inland Port is an Inland port-Dry port near the Ghanaian city of Kumasi.

== Timeline ==
- The project started sometime in late 2007 and stalled in 2008. It was revived in 2018 and as at 2024, the first phase was 70% complete.

== See also ==
- Transport in Ghana
- Ghana Railway Corporation
