= Lahore Dry Port =

Dry port in Punjab, Pakistan

Lahore Dry Port لاہور خشک بندرگاہ
- Interactive map of Lahore Dry Port لاہور خشک بندرگاہ

Location
- Country: Pakistan
- Location: Lahore, Punjab
- Coordinates: 31.557°N 74.372°E

Details
- Opened: 1973
- Type of harbour: Dry port

Statistics
- Website mict.com.pk

Lahore Dry Port (Urdu: لاہور خشک بندرگاہ) is a dry port located in Lahore, Pakistan.

== History ==
Lahore Dry Port was the first dry port in Pakistan and originally opened in Mughalpura, Lahore. The dry port was constructed by Pakistan Railways and has been managed by it since 1973. In 2008, an agreement was signed between Pakistan Railways, Qasim International Container Terminal and Premier Mercantile Services to build a new dry port in Prem Nagar.
