= Container Corporation of India =

Indian container transport company

Container Corporation of India Limited
- Type: Public
- Traded as: NSE: CONCOR; BSE: 531344
- Industry: Transport
- Founded: March 1988; 38 years ago
- Headquarters: New Delhi, India
- Key people: Sh. Ajit Kumar Panda (Chairman & Managing Director)
- Products: Terminals; Intermodal
- Revenue: ▲₹9,023 crore (US$940 million) (2024)
- Operating income: ▲₹1,638 crore (US$170 million) (2024)
- Net income: ▲₹1,232 crore (US$130 million) (2024)
- Total assets: ▲₹14,038 crore (US$1.5 billion) (2024)
- Total equity: ▲₹11,823 crore (US$1.2 billion) (2024)
- Owner: Government of India
- Number of employees: 1,400 (March 2021)
- Subsidiaries: CONCOR Air Limited; Fresh and Healthy Enterprise Limited; Punjab Logistics Infrastructure Limited; SIDCUL CONCOR Infra Company Limited
- Website: concorindia.co.in

Container Corporation of India Limited (CONCOR) is an Indian public sector undertaking which is engaged in transportation and handling of containers. Incorporated in March 1988 under the Companies Act, CONCOR commenced operations in November 1989 taking over an existing network of seven inland container depots (ICDs) from Indian Railways.

== History ==
CONCOR is one of the Indian public sector undertakings that is currently under consideration for privatisation. The privatisation process, which involves the Indian Government selling 30.8% out of its shareholding of 54.8%, was initially projected to be completed in the fiscal year 2021–2022, but has since been delayed to the next fiscal year. In April 2022, the Indian Government reduced Indian Railways' land licensing fee from 6% to 3% of the land's market value, which was done to assist the company's privatisation.

== Operations ==
CONCOR has multiple operations: cargo carrier; terminal, warehouse & MMLP operation.

== Container shipping ==
As per CNN-News18 report from 19 November 2024, a roadmap study would be commissioned by Container Corporation of India Limited to one of the leading consulting firms, Ernst & Young, KPMG, or PwC, in order to enter the global container shipping industry. The initial target areas will be the Middle East and South Asia. In February 2026, Bharat Container Shipping Line (BCSL) was inaugurated along with the partnership with Shipping Corporation of India (SCI), Sagarmala Finance & Major port trusts of India which broke the monopoly of Container shipping in India by the Chinese market.
