= Tororo Inland Port =

Dry port in Uganda

- Click on the map for a fullscreen view

Location
- Country: Uganda
- Location: Malaba
- Coordinates: 0.6500°N 34.2500°E

Details
- Owned by: Great Lakes Ports Limited

Tororo Inland Port is a proposed dry port in inland Uganda.

== Location ==
The inland port would be located on 250 acres (100 ha) in the town of Malaba, Uganda, close to the border with Kenya. This location is approximately 11 kilometres (7 mi), by road, east of the town of Tororo, on the Tororo–Eldoret Highway. This is approximately 217 kilometres (135 mi), by road, east of Kampala, the capital and largest city of Uganda.

== Overview ==
Tororo Inland Port is a proposed dry inland port. It is under development by Great Lakes Ports Limited of Kenya, who own the port and will operate it if and when completed. The port will serve as a storage area for containers of imports destined for Uganda, Rwanda, Burundi, Southern Sudan and Eastern DRC. The port will replace the ten or so storage facilities used by Uganda, to store these containers prior to the clearance of customs and other importation procedures. It is expected that this will greatly decongest the port at Kilindini, Mombasa, on the Indian Ocean, and cut down the time it takes for a container on a ship in Mombasa to arrive in Tororo, from 18 days to only five days.

== History ==
Construction of the inland port was commissioned in June 2010 by Yoweri Museveni, the President of Uganda. The port was expected to be ready to commence business in November 2012. Construction was expected to cost US$120 million. The company that owns this transport infrastructure project is based in neighboring Kenya.

Since 2010, political, economic and regional issues have interfered with the development of this inland port. As of September 2021, it is not clear if the project will be completed.

== See also ==
- Malaba, Uganda
- Tororo
- Uganda Revenue Authority
- Mombasa
