= Tanzania–Burundi Standard Gauge Railway =

Railway infrastructure in East Africa

The Tanzania–Burundi Standard Gauge Railway is an electrified railway line currently under construction. Connecting the Tanzanian Standard Gauge Railway with the planned railway network of Burundi, it will link the town of Uvinza in western Tanzania to the capital of Burundi, Gitega, via the border town of Musongati. Through the Tanzanian railway network, the line will provide Burundi with a rail link to the Indian Ocean. On August 16, 2025, Burundian President Évariste Ndayishimiye and Tanzanian Prime Minister Kassim Majaliwa inaugurated the construction of the railway in Musongati. The project is the first phase of the proposed Tanzania–Burundi–DR Congo Standard Gauge Railway. Feasibility studies for the extension via Bujumbura and Uvira to Kindu are currently underway.

== Overview ==
In January 2022, the governments of Tanzania and Burundi signed a Memorandum of Understanding, in which they agreed to the construction of a standard gauge (1435 mm or 4 ft 8^{1}/_{2} in) railway line between the two countries. Initially, costs were estimated at US$900 million. The planned railway line is an extension of Tanzania's Standard Gauge Railway and is aimed at reducing transportation cost and increasing regional economic integration. Construction began on August 16, 2025 in the town of Musongati in the presence of Burundian President Évariste Ndayishimiye and Tanzanian Prime Minister Kassim Majaliwa.

Construction of the railway is also aimed at intensifying the exploitation of the world's tenth largest nickel deposits located at Musongati, as well as enabling exploitation of Burundi's lithium and cobalt deposits. The East African Community as well as the African Union have consequently named the railway as one of their top priorities.

Tanzania's finance ministry expects more than a million yearly tonnes of cargo to be transported between the two countries, and more than 3 million tonnes of minerals each year to be ferried from Burundi to Tanzania. It would be only the second transnational electrified railway on the African continent. The timeline for the completion of the project is five years.

In August 2022, the Tanzanian government invited bids for the design and construction of the Uvinza-Gitega (Tanzania-Burundi) Standard Gauge line. The Tanzania Railway Corporation is managing procurement for the governments of both countries, though Burundi's ARTF will be involved in supervision of the construction. Bidding closed on November 15, 2023. In March 2024, the governments of Tanzania and Burundi commenced formal talks on the technical aspects of construction. In January 2025, China Railway Engineering Group and China Railway Engineering Design and Consulting Group were announced as the contractors for the project. The project is expected to be completed in 72 months, including a 12-month review period and the final cost of the project is estimated to be around $2.15 billion.

The line will span approximately 367 kilometres, featuring 282 kilometres of main railway line and 85 kilometres of siding and passing loops. It will be built based on AREMA and UIC standards. The line will allow for speeds of up to 160 kilometres per hour.

The project is also expected to eventually extend to DR Congo, starting with an initial extension from Musongati to Gitega, and then onward to Bujumbura, Uvira, and Kindu, with feasibility studies are currently underway.

== Location ==
The railway line will connect to the Tanzanian standard gauge network at the town of Uvinza. From there, it runs in a general northwesterly direction along the Malagarasi river across the international border to the town of Musongati and onwards to the Burundian capital Gitega.

Four new stations are planned in Tanzania: Mutinde, Kasulu, Lugoma and a border station. Five stations are planned in Burundi: a border station, Rutana, Musongati, Gitega-Ceru and Gitega-Rutegama.

== Phases ==
The project is divided in two lots, of which the second lot is to be completed in two phases.

=== Lot 1 ===
==== Uvinza–Malagarasi ====
This section of 156 kilometres will be built by Tanzania. In total, 180 kilometres of railway infrastructure will be built on this section. Costs for this section are estimated at US$959.4 million.

=== Lot 2 ===
==== Malagarasi–Gitega ====
This section will be built by Burundi and is to be completed in two phases. Phase A stretches from Malagarasi to Musongati for a distance of 80 kilometres. At the border, a 600 metre multimodal bridge will be built, accommodating both cars and trains. Phase B runs for 46 kilometres from Musongati to Gitega. In total, 187 kilometres of railway infrastructure will be built on the section. The cost for this section is expected to be US$1442.7 million.

== Funding ==
The Burundian and Tanzanian governments have applied for financing from the African Development Bank (AfDB). The AfDB has expressed interest in financing the project.

Both governments have already set aside funds for the construction of the railway line.

Supporting Tanzania's SGR ambitions, the AfDB has pledged US$3.05 billion towards the SGR link Tabora–Kigoma and lot 1 of the Tanzania–Burundi SGR.

In December 2023, the AfDB approved various financing structures valued at US$696.41 million. The funds are intended for an electrified Tabora-Kigoma link in Tanzania as well as the Tanzania–Burundi SGR. The bank will provide US$98.62 million to Burundi in the form of grants and US$597.79 million to Tanzania in the form of loans and guarantees. In addition, the bank aims to mobilize financing of up to US$3.2 billion from commercial banks, development finance institutions, export credit agencies and institutional investors.

In November 2024, the Tanzanian government announced that it had secured the funding for the Tanzanian section of the railway. The funds will be provided by Standard Chartered, Sinosure and the AfDB.

== See also ==
- Central Corridor
- East African Railway Masterplan
