= Northern Corridor Transit and Transport Coordination Authority =

- Type: Private
- Industry: Transport Infrastructure
- Founded: 1985; 41 years ago
- Headquarters: Mombasa, Kenya
- Key people: Omae Nyarandi; Executive Secretary
- Products: Railway Systems, Interstate Roads, Interstate Pipelines, Inland Water Transport Systems
- Owner: Governments of Kenya; Uganda; Rwanda; Burundi; South Sudan; DR Congo
- Website: www.ttcanc.org/index.php

The Northern Corridor Transit and Transport Coordination Authority (NCTTCA) is an intergovernmental body, encompassing six countries in Eastern Africa, tasked with the job of coordinating transport infrastructure improvements.

The Northern Corridor includes the Port of Mombasa, the international road network, rail networks, inland waterways and pipeline transport. The core element of the Northern Corridor is the port of Mombasa, the largest port in Kenya, which connects Kenya and five other landlocked countries to the sea and with the world economy. The six countries covered by the NCTTCA are Kenya, Uganda, Rwanda, Burundi, South Sudan and the Democratic Republic of the Congo. The Northern corridor also serves northern Tanzania and parts of Ethiopia.

== Location ==
The headquarters of the NCTTCA and the organization's Permanent Secretariat are located at House 1196, Links Road, in Nyali, a neighborhood with Mombasa, the largest port and second-largest city of Kenya. The geographical coordinates of the Authority headquarters are 04°02'59.0"S, 39°41'30.0"E (Latitude:-4.049722; Longitude:39.691667).

== Overview ==
One of its main objectives is to build standard gauge railways connecting Uganda, Rwanda, South Sudan and the eastern parts of The Democratic Republic of the Congo, to the Kenyan port city of Mombasa.

A refined oil products pipeline, carrying jet fuel, petrol and kerosene is also under development. The pipeline, measuring 20 inches (51 cm) in diameter, is being laid from the Kenyan coast to Uganda and Rwanda. The 450 kilometres (280 mi) pipeline will replace an estimated 700 oil tanker trucks that transport fuel by road between Mombasa and Nairobi, on a daily basis, according to the Kenya Pipeline Company.

== See also ==
- Uganda Standard Gauge Railway
