= Port of Tucson =

- Company type: Private
- Industry: Transportation
- Founded: 1986
- Founder: Alan Levin
- Headquarters: 6964 E Century Park Drive Tucson, Arizona 85756
- Area served: Arizona
- Key people: Mike Levin (VP of Commercial Real Estate); Matt Levin (VP of Operations)
- Owner: Levin Family
- Number of employees: 28 (2026)
- Interactive map of Port of Tucson
- Location in USA Arizona

Location
- Country: United States
- Location: Tucson, Arizona
- Coordinates: 32.1263°N 110.8497°W

Details
- Opened: 2004
- Land area: 767 acres (3.10 km^{2})

Statistics
- Website portoftucson.com

The Port of Tucson (POT) is a dry port, or inland intermodal facility, located in Tucson, Arizona, United States.

== History ==
=== Beginnings ===
Alan Levin, the owner, founded the company in 1986, began purchasing property around the area of the current POT in the 1990s, and the port began operations in 2004.

=== International Expansion ===
In April 2013, the port completed a $19 million infrastructure investment to be able to ship and receive international intermodal containers. The expansion includes the installation of 20,000 feet of new rail purchased from Union Pacific. This will give the POT the ability to handle intermodal unit trains of 60-100 cars. This upgrade allows containers to be unloaded from a ship at the Port of Los Angeles or Port of Long Beach, shipped via train directly to the POT, and then unloaded for local or regional delivery. This direct rail service capability should reduce truck traffic on I-10 between LA and Tucson.

On May 31, 2013, at a press event featuring local business leaders and government officials, the first international container was delivered. It contained Chinese pottery that had passed through the Port of Long Beach.

The port also acts as a foreign trade zone where international goods can pass through the port without being subject to taxes or tariffs. This allows the port to facilitate the exportation of produce grown in Mexico that is then shipped to other countries. An example of this is kabocha, a squash that is popular in Japan. The squash is grown in Mexico, is trucked into the US through the Nogales-Mariposa port of entry, loaded into international sized containers at the POT, and then sent by rail to a US port for shipping to Japan.

In September 2013, the port successfully shipped its first export for Azmira, a pet food company, with delivery to Japan. The ability to export directly was major gain for the company as they are now able to get empty containers from the POT and send shipments without having a driver make the trip to the Port of Los Angeles. Further, by moving from trucking to rail service the company is able to move from 40,000 pounds to 55,000 pounds per container.

=== Produce Development ===
In 2015, the POT constructed additional cold storage space to further enhance their on-site food handling capabilities.

=== Service Improvements ===
In May 2015, the port along with Union Pacific announced improvements made possible though a grant.

=== Amazon Move-In ===
In 2018, Amazon announced that they would be building a new distribution facility on site at the POT, though speculation has swirled prior to the announcement. The facility opened in 2019.

== Rolling Stock ==
The Port of Tucson maintains several EMD locomotives for switching the industries on site.

| Model | Number | Year built | Previous Owner(s) | Notes |
|---|---|---|---|---|
| GP28 | 1827 | 1964 | Ex-KYLE 1827/IRRC 9432, IC 9432 | |
| GP30 | 2200 | 1963 | Ex-KYLE 2200/CR 2200/PC 2200/PRR 2200 | |
| GP30 | 2210 | 1977 | Ex-KYLE 2210/CR 2210/PC 2210/PRR 2210 | |
