= I Am Second =

US organization

- An image of the I Am Second platform
- Founded: December 2, 2008
- Founder: Norm Miller
- Type: Religious
- Location: Plano, Texas, US
- Region served: Global
- Key people: Norm Miller - Founder
- Website: iamsecond.com

I Am Second is a US multimedia movement and not-for-profit organization that is designed to inspire people to "put Jesus Christ first" in their lives. It was founded in 2008 by Norm Miller, the CEO and Chairman of the Interstate Battery System of America, in partnership with a group of individuals from e3 Partners Ministry, an evangelical group.

== History ==
I Am Second was founded on December 2, 2008, in collaboration with a small team from e3 Partners Ministry with whom Miller had previously worked. It started as an outreach organization for those individuals living in the Dallas–Fort Worth area.

== Videos ==
I Am Second's website advertises ways in which an individual can become involved with the movement. In particular, the website shows video testimonies from individuals who have been transformed by their faith, such as finding the power to overcome various struggles. Each video testimony is intended to correspond with a subject area or common struggle that people may experience throughout their lives. In 2011 Bethany Hamilton, who lost her left arm in a shark attack at the age of 13, recorded a testimony for the project describing how relying on her faith helped her through the experience. Other stars who have recorded videos for I Am Second include former Texas Rangers outfielder Josh Hamilton, Grammy award winner Michael W. Smith, former Dallas Cowboys linebacker Bradie James and Korn guitarist Brian Welch.

== Groups ==
In order to strengthen connection to others involved in the movement and in their Christian faith, I Am Second groups have been established by the organization. These groups are centered on discussions wherein people share and discuss daily struggles and issues of life in a Christian context. One of the main goals of these groups are to introduce the idea of people restructuring their life in a way in which they put God first and themselves second. Furthermore, I Am Second groups function in order to help members explore and discover their own personal purpose in life, as well as unite people who are on similar spiritual journeys.
