= Masaka, Rwanda =

Masaka
- Map of Rwanda showing the location of Masaka.
- Coordinates: 01°59′44″S 30°11′30″E
- Country: Rwanda
- Province: City of Kigali
- District: kicukiro District
- Elevation: 1,449 m (4,754 ft)
- Time zone: UTC+2 (CAT)

Masaka is a populated neighborhood within the city of Kigali, the capital and largest city of Rwanda.

== Location ==
Masaka is located in Gasabo District, City of Kigali, approximately 17 kilometres (11 mi), by road, south-east of the central business district of Kigali City. Masaka is located about 9 kilometres (6 mi), by road, south-west of Kabuga, at the eastern edge of the city of Kigali, along KK3 Road (RN3). The coordinates of Masaka are: 01°59'44.0"S, 30°11'30.0"E (Latitude:-1.995556; Longitude:30.191667).

== Overview ==
Masaka is a sparsely populated area with an estimated population of approximately 4,558, as of January 2018. In January 2018, the government of Rwanda selected this neighborhood to be the location of the cargo terminal of the western end of the Isaka–Kigali Standard Gauge Railway. The government of Rwanda is in the process of developing a cargo center in the Masaka neighborhood.

== Points of interest ==
The following points of interest lie in or near Masaka: (a) The KK3 Road (RN3), the main route leading east, out of the city of Kigali (b) Masaka Hospital (c) Masaka Trade Center (d) Masaka Mosque (e) Masaka Kingdom Hall of Johovah's Witnesses (f) Masaka Farms, a restaurant and (g) The cargo terminal of the Isaka-Kigali Standard Gauge Railway will be constructed here.
