= Northern Corridor =

African transport route

Northern Corridor is a busy and important transport route to the East and Central Africa countries of Burundi, Eastern DR Congo, Kenya, Rwanda, South Sudan and Uganda.

The main Northern Corridor transport network is connected to the Port of Mombasa and includes a road network; railways belonging to Kenya Railways Corporation and Uganda Railways Corporation; rail-lake transport; inland water routes; container terminals commonly regarded locally as ICDs (Inland Container Depots); Tororo Inland Port - whose contract was awarded to Great Lakes Ports Limited of Kenya amid opposition from clearing firms and truck transporters; plus an oil pipeline.

The alternative transport network serving the landlocked Great Lakes Region is through Tanzania, called the Central Corridor, which is linked to Dar es Salaam. This uses Tanzania railways' Central Line.

== Legal basis and governance ==
The corridor operates under the Northern Corridor Transit and Transport Agreement, a multilateral treaty first signed in 1985 by Burundi, Kenya, Rwanda and Uganda to facilitate transit traffic along the route; the Democratic Republic of the Congo acceded the following year. The agreement was revised in 1996, when the emphasis moved to harmonising regulations and simplifying procedures, and again in 2007, when it was recast to develop the transit route into a development corridor covering four surface transport modes through eleven protocols. South Sudan also became a party, so that five land-linked states are members alongside Kenya as the coastal state.

The agreement replaced earlier bilateral arrangements with a single framework for moving transit cargo between Mombasa and the hinterland of the member states. Article 4 obliges the parties to establish viable transport systems, to grant non-discriminatory treatment, to harmonise procedures and to promote private-sector participation, while Article 5 provides for the free movement of the parties' citizens engaged in trade and prohibits discrimination based on the origin of the cargo or the registration of the means of transport. The agreement is administered through five organs: a Council of Ministers, specialised technical committees, a public–private partnership committee, an executive committee and a permanent secretariat.
