= Central Corridor (Africa) =

The Central Corridor is a transport and trading route located in East and Central Africa. Its end point is the Tanzanian port city of Dar es Salaam, where it connects to the rest of the world via shipping. From Dar es Salaam, the corridor runs inland, serving the Tanzanian interior including its capital Dodoma and second city of Mwanza, as well as landlocked Rwanda and Burundi, and the eastern part of the Democratic Republic of the Congo. This route consists uses Tanzania's Central Line as well as connecting road networks.

The Central Corridor provides an alternative route to the ocean from Rwandan, Burundi and the DRC from the higher traffic Northern Corridor, which runs through Uganda and Kenya to the port of Mombasa.

== Legal basis and governance ==
The corridor is administered under the Central Corridor Transit Transport Facilitation Agreement, signed at Dar es Salaam on 2 September 2006 by Burundi, the Democratic Republic of the Congo, Rwanda, Tanzania and Uganda. The agreement was amended on 1 December 2023 to admit Malawi and Zambia, bringing the membership to seven states.

The agreement established the Central Corridor Transit Transport Facilitation Agency, whose purpose is to promote efficient transit transport systems and their maintenance over time in the interest of the contracting parties, with a view to improving the competitiveness of the corridor. Its permanent secretariat was established in July 2010 with its head office in Dar es Salaam, and the Agency operates through an Interstate Council of Ministers, an Executive Board, a Stakeholders Consultative Committee and the Permanent Secretariat.
