= Isaka =

- Location in Tanzania
- Coordinates: 3°54′0″S 32°56′0″E
- Country: north west Tanzania
- Region: Shinyanga
- District: Kahama Rural
- Elevation: 3,927 ft (1,197 m)
- Time zone: UTC+3 (East Africa Time)

Isaka is a small town and station on the narrow-gauge Mwanza railway line of Tanzania which connects to the seaport of Dar es Salaam.

== Transport ==
It is located in Kahama Rural District of Shinyanga Region. In the 1980s a dry port was established there to serve the landlocked countries of Burundi and Rwanda, since Isaka is on a highway, now paved, running 610 km from the Rwandan capital, Kigali. The dry port functions as a sub-port of Dar es Salaam. Road transport companies can collect containers coming from overseas at Isaka and clear customs there, and deliver containers going overseas to the same location. Isaka also handles containers for the north-eastern Democratic Republic of the Congo.

In 2017, a new station on the standard gauge railway is proposed.

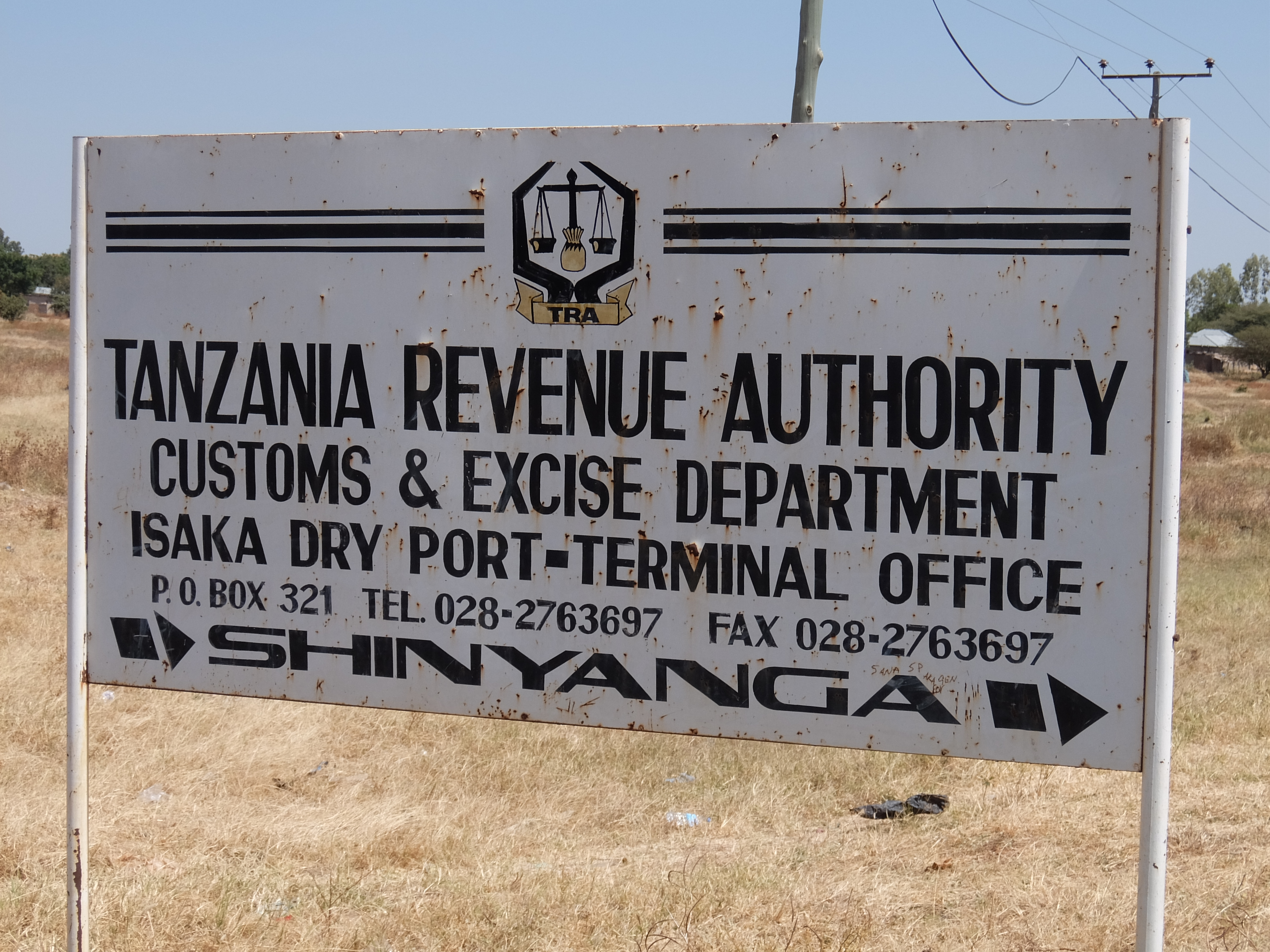
Sign indicating Isaka Dry Port

In 2006, China offered funds to carry out feasibility studies to extend the Tanzanian Railway system to serve Burundi and Rwanda directly. There is an alternate plan to connect these landlocked countries to the Cape Gauge southern African railway network via DR Congo, but the DR Congo network itself is still in poor condition. Burundi and Rwanda are also connected by paved highway to Kampala which has a rail link to the seaport of Mombasa.
