= 2 ft and 600 mm gauge railways =

Railway track gauge

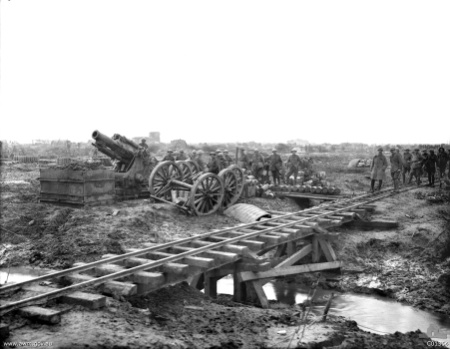
A BL 9.2-inch howitzer with shells lined up on the ground recently delivered from the trench railway in the foreground during World War I

Two foot and 600 mm gauge railways are narrow-gauge railways with track gauges of 2 ft (610 mm) and 600 mm (1 ft 11 5/8 in), respectively. Railways with similar, less common track gauges, such as 1 ft 11 3/4 in (603 mm) and 1 ft 11 1/2 in (597 mm), are grouped with 2 ft and 600 mm gauge railways.

== Overview ==
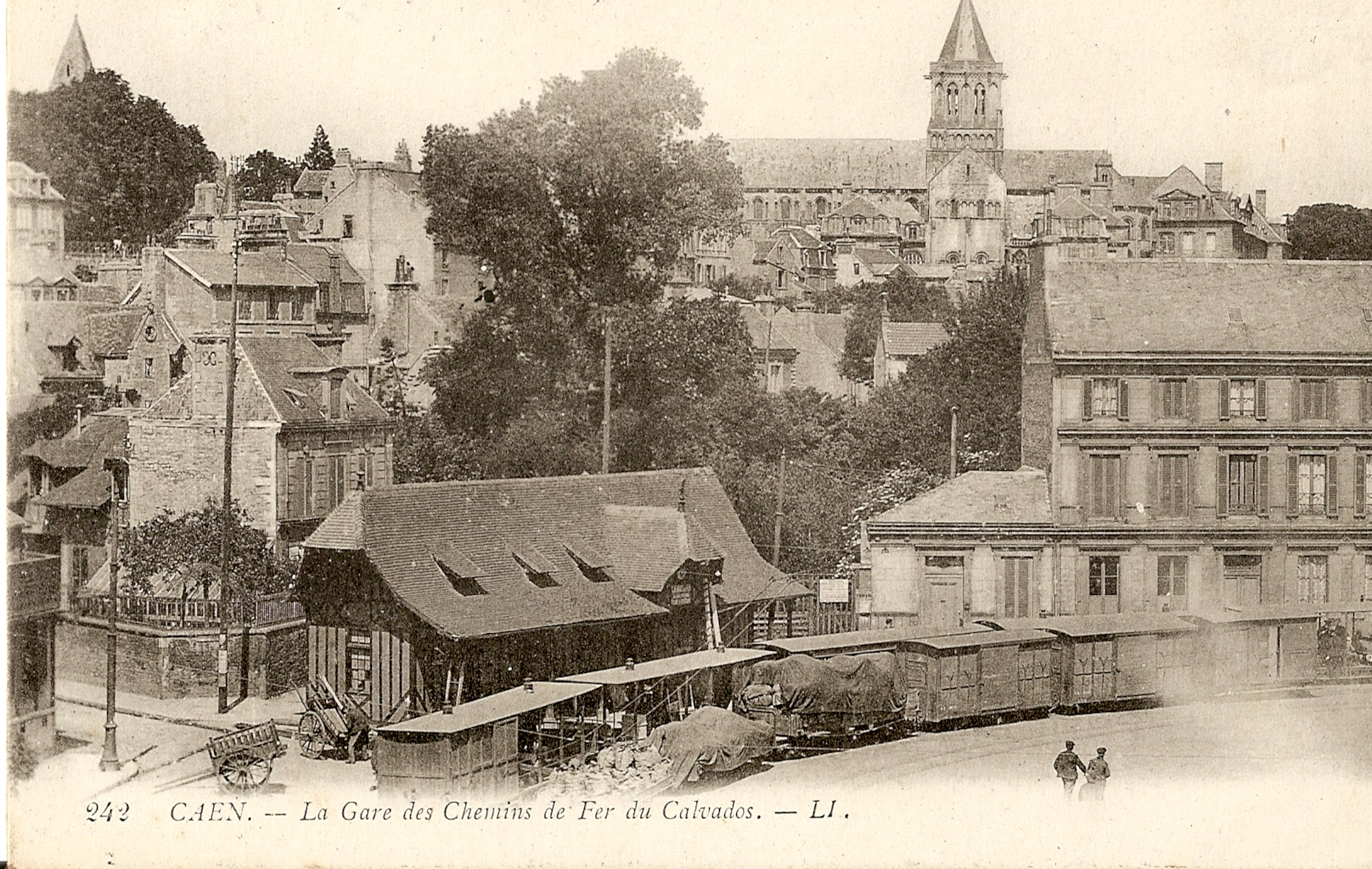
The Chemins de fer du Calvados' Caen station in France

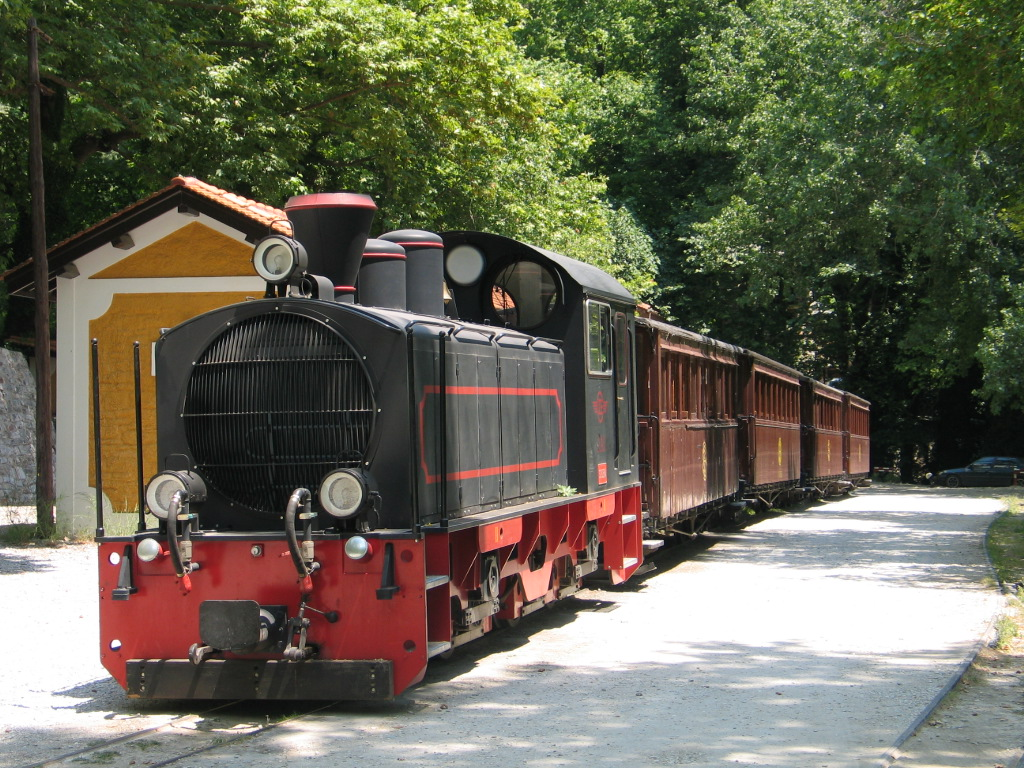
A steam outline Schöma diesel locomotive on the Pelion railway in Greece

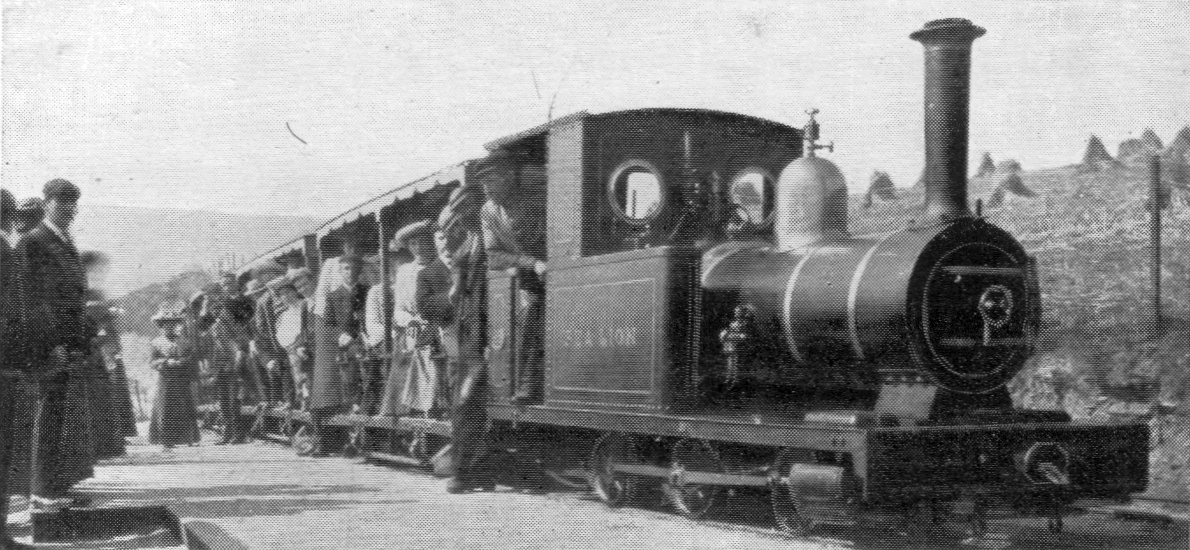
The Groudle Glen Railway Sea Lion locomotive c. 1910 on the Isle of Man

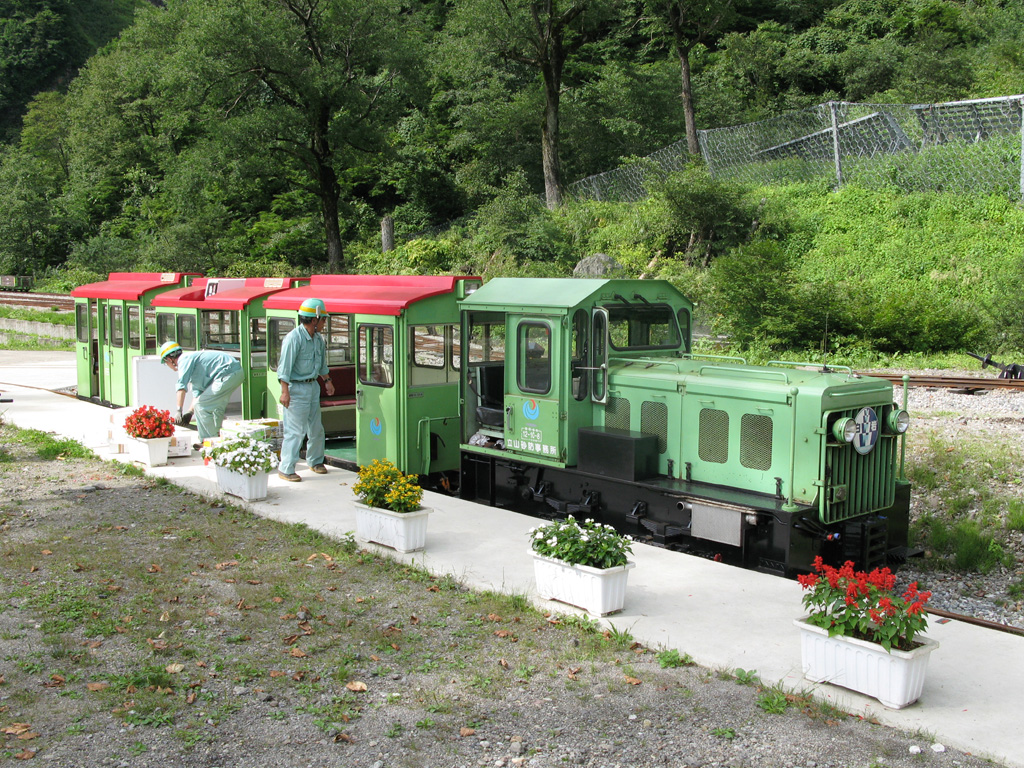
The Tateyama Sabō Erosion Control Works Service Train in Japan

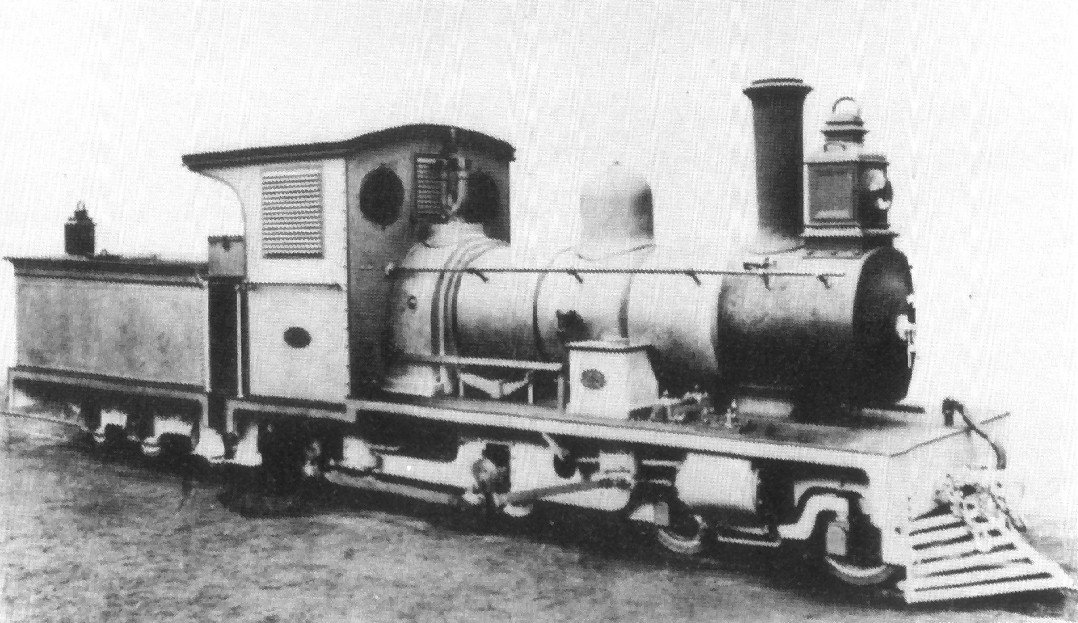
Beira Railroad Corporation Class F4 No. 38 in Mozambique

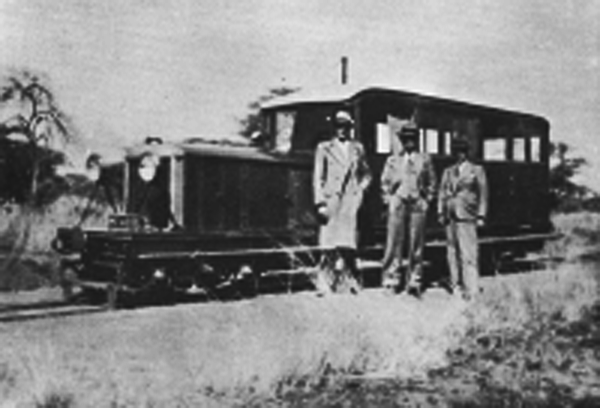
The gasoline engine Crown Prince of the Otavi Mining and Railway Company in South West Africa (now Namibia). This railcar was able to reach a speed of 137 kilometres (85 mi) per hour.

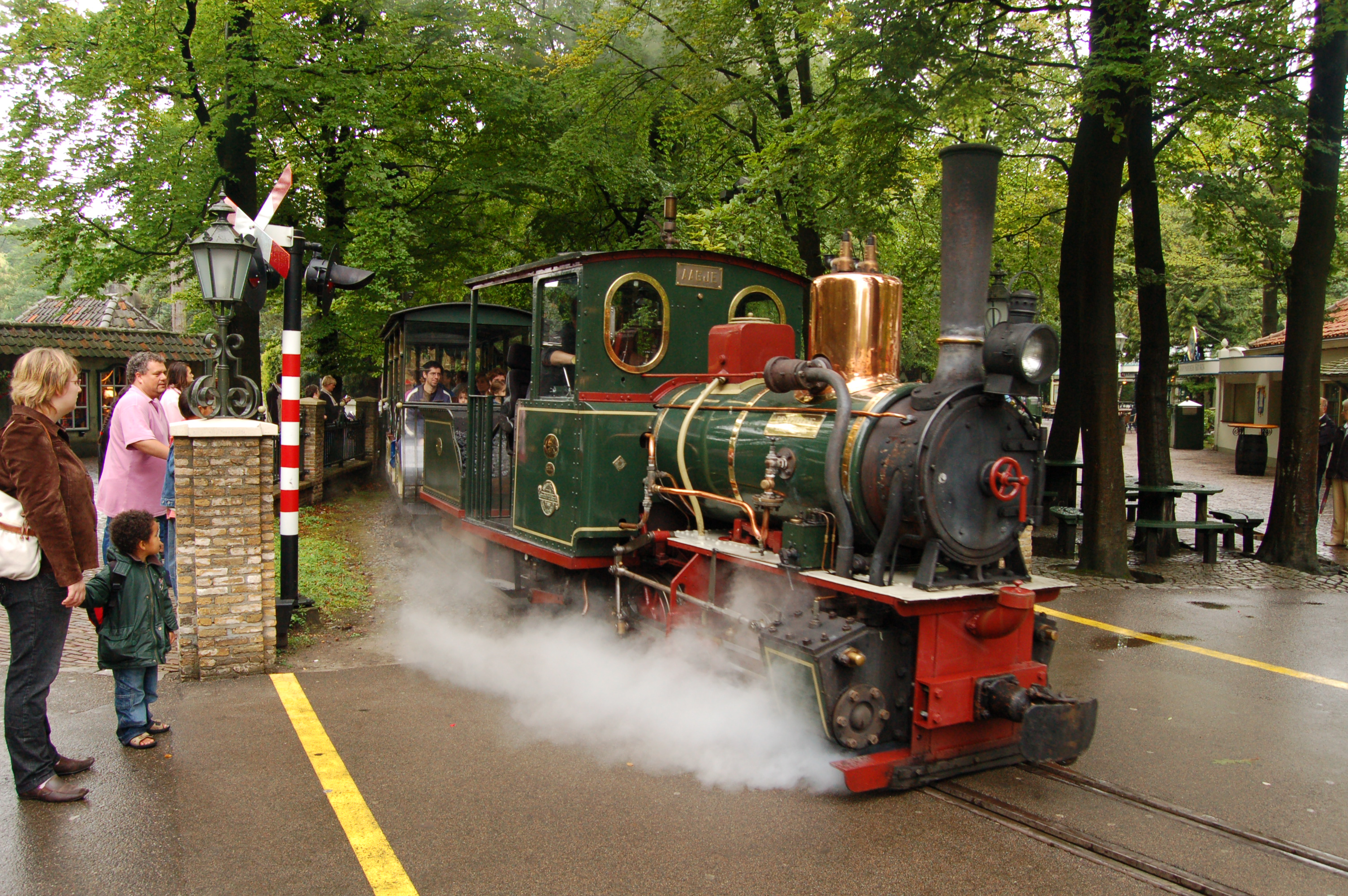
The Efteling Steam Train Company, located in Efteling in the Netherlands, runs some locomotives that are more than a century old.

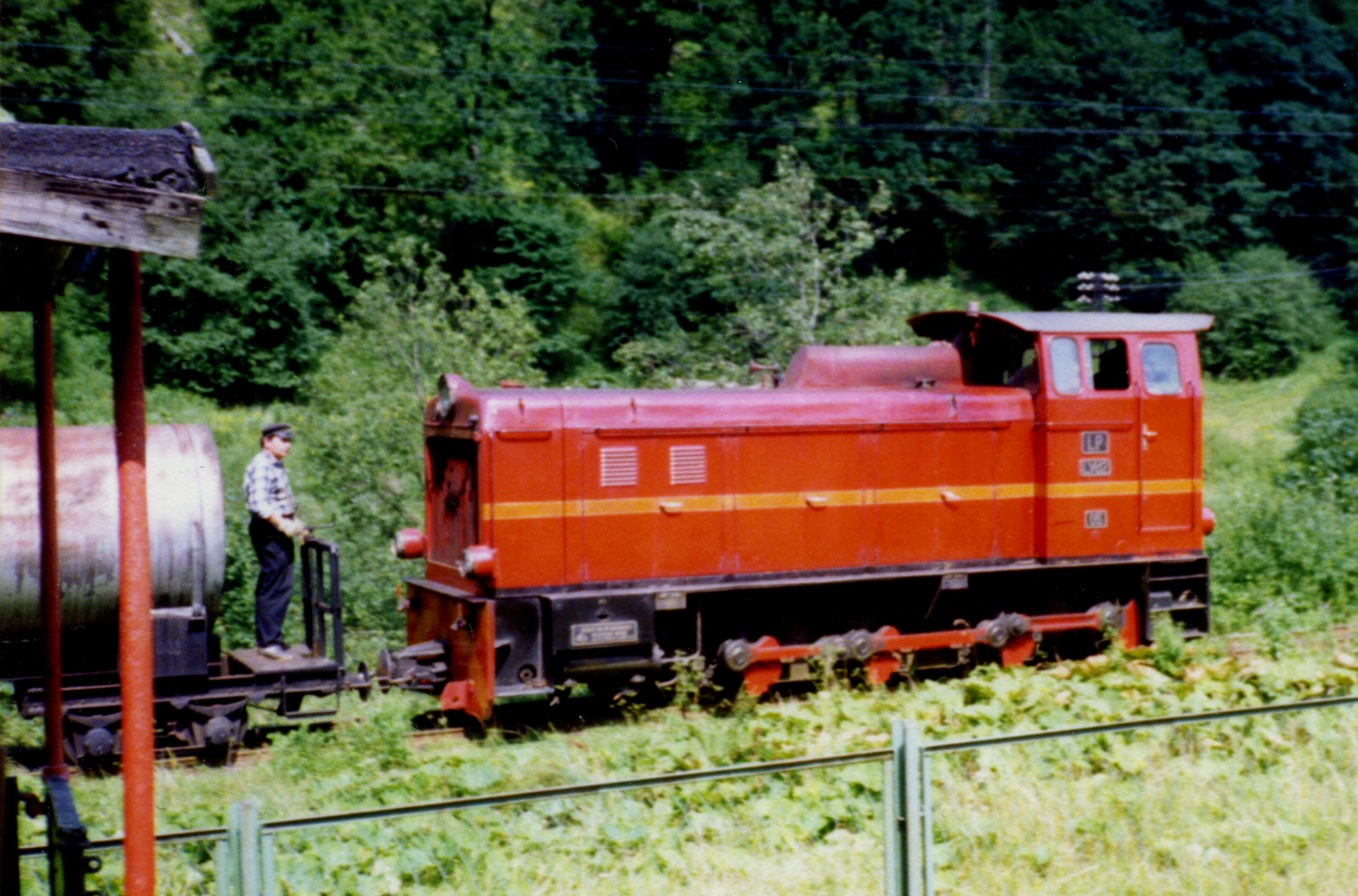
Lyd2 locomotive built by 23 August Locomotive Works (FAUR) in Romania

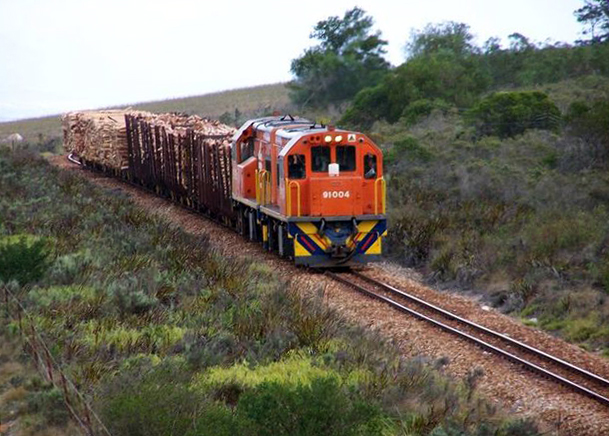
A Spoornet Class 91-000 on the Avontuur Railway in South Africa

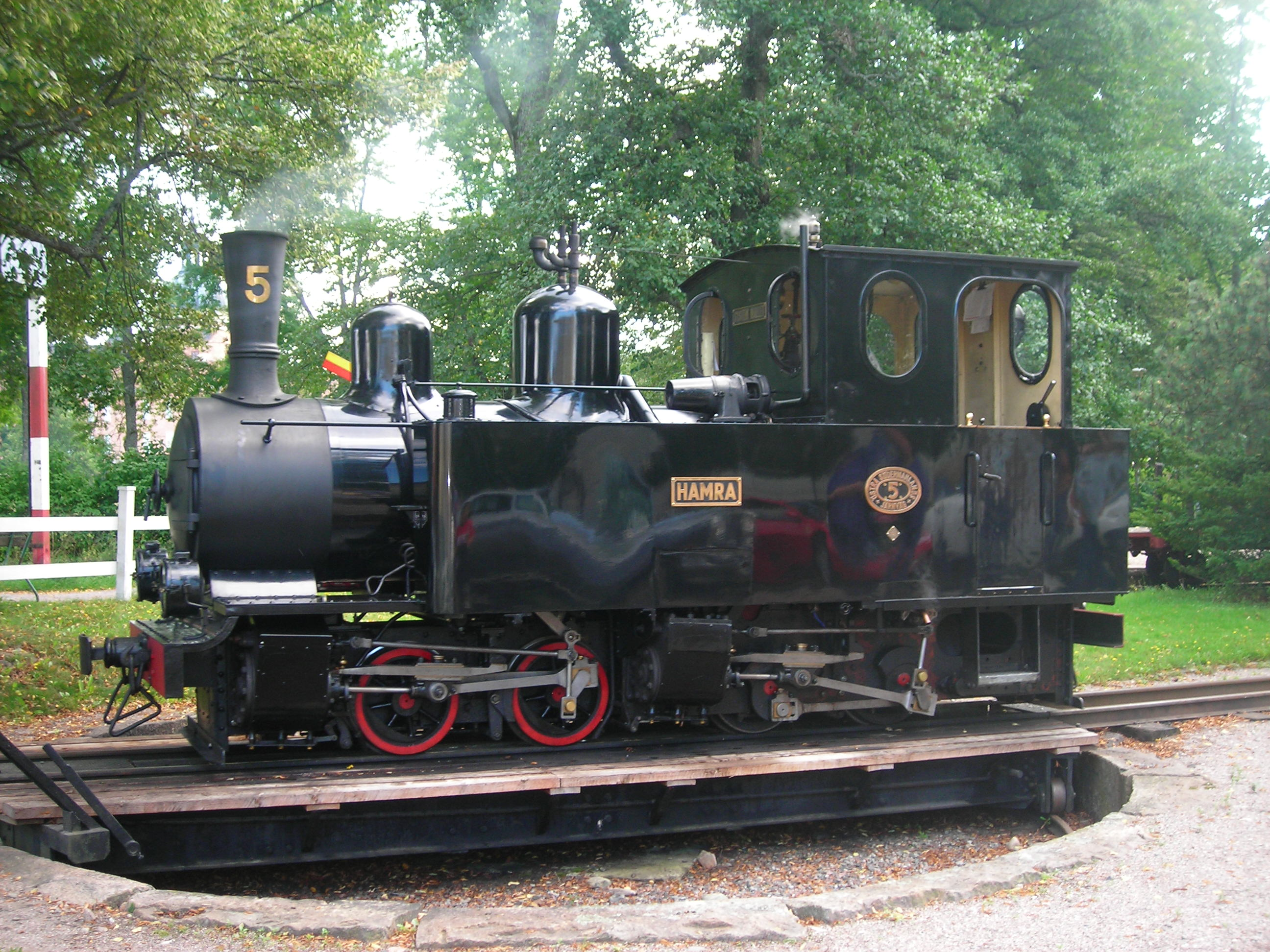
A locomotive and turntable on the Östra Södermanlands Järnväg in Sweden

Most of these lines are tourist lines, which are often heritage railways or industrial lines, such as the Ffestiniog Railway in Wales and the Cripple Creek and Victor Narrow Gauge Railroad in Colorado.

World War I trench railways produced the greatest concentration of 600 mm (1 ft 11 5/8 in) gauge railways to date. In preparation for World War II, the French Maginot Line and Alpine Line also used 600 mm (1 ft 11 5/8 in) gauge railways for supply routes to the fixed border defenses.

Australia has over 4,000 kilometres (2,500 mi) of 2 ft (610 mm) gauge sugar cane railway networks in the coastal areas of Queensland, which carry more than 30 million tonnes of sugar cane a year.

Many 2 ft (610 mm) gauge and 600 mm (1 ft 11 5/8 in) gauge railways are used in amusement parks and theme parks worldwide.

== Exchange of rolling stock ==
The interchange of rolling stock between these similar track gauges occasionally occurred; for example, the South African Class NG15 2-8-2 locomotives started their career on the 600 mm (1 ft 11 5/8 in) gauge. The Otavi Mining and Railway Company in South West Africa (now Namibia) were transferred to the 2 ft gauge railways in South Africa and currently some surviving locomotives reside in Wales on the 1 ft 11 1/2 in (597 mm) gauge Welsh Highland Railway and the 1 ft 11 3/4 in (603 mm) gauge Brecon Mountain Railway.

== Railways ==
Country/territory	Railway	Gauge
Albania	Main article: Narrow-gauge railways in Albania	600 mm (1 ft 11 5/8 in)
Angola	Moçâmedes Railway (converted to 3 ft 6 in or 1,067 mm gauge) (operating); Porto Amboim–Gabela line (defunct)	600 mm (1 ft 11 5/8 in)
Argentina	Ferrocarril Económico Correntino (defunct); Paseo con Ciencia tramway (operating); Rainforest Ecological Train (operating); Republic of the Children (operating); Ushuaia Prison Railway (rebuilt as the 500 mm (19 3/4 in) gauge Southern Fuegian Railway) (operating); Various construction, mining, and agricultural railways (defunct)	600 mm (1 ft 11 5/8 in)
Australia	Main article: Two foot gauge railways in Australia	2 ft (610 mm)
Austria	Main article: Narrow-gauge railways in Austria	600 mm (1 ft 11 5/8 in)
Belarus	Narrow-gauge railways in Belarus	600 mm (1 ft 11 5/8 in)
Belgium	MusicXpress (located in Walibi Belgium) (defunct)	2 ft (610 mm)
Belgium	Sourbrodt–Elsenborn Camp; 3.2 km (defunct); Stoomcentrum Maldegem (standard-gauge lines also present) (operating)	600 mm (1 ft 11 5/8 in)
Brazil	Perus-Pirapora Railway (operating); São Mateus Railway (defunct)	600 mm (1 ft 11 5/8 in)
Brunei	Main article: Transport in Brunei	2 ft (610 mm)
Bulgaria	Main article: Narrow-gauge railways in Bulgaria	600 mm (1 ft 11 5/8 in)
Burundi	Port of Bujumbura railway (defunct)	600 mm (1 ft 11 5/8 in)
Cambodia	Phnom Krom railway (defunct)	600 mm (1 ft 11 5/8 in)
Canada	Assiniboine Park Railroad (located in Assiniboine Park) (operating); Centreville Train (located in Centreville Amusement Park) (operating); Columbia Cranberries Railway (operational status unknown); Erie Peat Railway; 3-kilometre (1.9 mi) (defunct); Fort George Railway (located at the Exploration Place Museum and Science Centre) (operating); Greater Vancouver Zoo Railway (located in Greater Vancouver Zoo) (operating); Port Elgin and North Shore Railroad; 1.6-kilometre (0.99 mi) (defunct); Sooke Flowline (aqueduct) construction railway; 44-kilometre (27 mi), (defunct); Wildlife Express (located in BC Wildlife Park) (operating)	2 ft (610 mm)
Cameroon	West African Planting Society Victoria (defunct)	600 mm (1 ft 11 5/8 in)
Central African Republic	Zinga–Mongo railway (defunct)	600 mm (1 ft 11 5/8 in)
Chile	Chiloé railway (defunct); Puente Alto-El Volcán Railway (defunct); Putagán—Colbún railway (defunct)	600 mm (1 ft 11 5/8 in)
China	Main article: Narrow-gauge railways in China	600 mm (1 ft 11 5/8 in)
Comoros	Société Comores Bambaoa (defunct)	600 mm (1 ft 11 5/8 in)
Czech Republic	Dráha Kateřina; 15 km (operating); Kolínská řepařská drážka; 10.6 km (operating); Mladějovská železnice; 10.5 km (operating); Muzeum Průmyslových Železnic (Zbýšov, Czech Republic) ca 2.7 km (operating) (converted from standard gauge)	600 mm (1 ft 11 5/8 in)
Democratic Republic of the Congo	Mayumbe line (converted from 2 ft (610 mm) gauge) (defunct); Vicicongo line (operational status unknown)	600 mm (1 ft 11 5/8 in)
Denmark	Bunkermuseum Hanstholm museum (MuseumsCenter Hanstholm) railway is preserved.; Stenvad Mosebrug (Stenvad Mosebrugscenter), Mosebrugsbanen peat museum railway is preserved.; 610 mm – 2-foot gauge. This is the British version of 600 mm (2 feet). Where: It was used during World War I on some of the ammunition ranges and military installations that used British surplus equipment. Although the difference between 600 mm and 610 mm is only 1 centimeter, it is enough to cause uneven wear on the wheels if you mix them. 600 mm – The Field Railway at Hanstholm. During World War II, the Germans built a gigantic network of 600 mm tracks in the dunes at Hanstholm to transport shells to the enormous 38 cm guns. Today: You can actually still ride the "Ammunition Train" on parts of this track at Museumscenter Hanstholm. It is one of the few places where you can experience a military narrow gauge railway in action.	600 mm (1 ft 11 5/8 in)
Egypt	Sugar cane railways in Kurna (operating)	2 ft (610 mm)
Eritrea	Potash Transport Railway (defunct)	600 mm (1 ft 11 5/8 in)
Estonia	Peat railway in Nurme	600 mm (1 ft 11 5/8 in)
Falkland Islands	Camber Railway (defunct)	2 ft (610 mm)
Faroe Islands	Main article: Gjógv § Gjógv incline railway	600 mm (1 ft 11 5/8 in)
Fiji	Main article: Rail transport in Fiji	2 ft (610 mm)
Finland	Main article: Narrow-gauge railways in Finland	600 mm (1 ft 11 5/8 in)
France	Main article: Narrow-gauge railways in France	600 mm (1 ft 11 5/8 in)
Germany	Main article: 600 mm gauge railways in Germany	600 mm (1 ft 11 5/8 in)
Greece	Pelion railway (dual-gauge lines with 1,000 mm (3 ft 3 3/8 in) metre gauge track also present) (operating) (metre-gauge network defunct); Some industrial lines (partially defunct); World War I military railways (defunct)	600 mm (1 ft 11 5/8 in)
Greenland	Cryolite mine, Cryolite quarry Ivigtut, Ivigtut; Qoornoq X-press (defunct), Qoornoq	600 mm (1 ft 11 5/8 in)
Guatemala	Transcostero (located in Xetulul) (operating)	2 ft (610 mm)
Hong Kong	Sha Tau Kok Railway (defunct)	2 ft (610 mm)
Hungary	Almamellék Forest Railway; Felsőpetény Railway; Kemence Forest Museum Railway; several other mining and industrial railways, most of them defunct	600 mm (1 ft 11 5/8 in)
Iceland	Korpúlfsstaðir Farm Railway (defunct)	600 mm (1 ft 11 5/8 in)
India	Darjeeling Himalayan Railway (operating); Matheran Hill Railway (operating)	2 ft (610 mm)
Indonesia	Sugar mill railways in Java such as Jatiwangi (mill closed), Jatibarang (in use), Pangka (in use), Sragi (in use), Cepiring (mill closed), Soedhono (in use), Tulangan (in use), Panji (rail operation closed), and Gending (rail operation closed); Local tram service in Karawang and Rambipuji, all closed.	600 mm (1 ft 11 5/8 in)
Isle of Man	Groudle Glen Railway (operating); South Barrule quarry, windmill-powered incline (defunct)	2 ft (610 mm)
Italy	Cividale-Tarcetta Railway (defunct); Montevecchio Sciria-San Gavino Monreale Railway (defunct); Porto Empedocle-Lucia (defunct)	600 mm (1 ft 11 5/8 in)
Japan	Musashino-Mura Railway (located in Musashino-Mura) (operating); Narita Yume Bokujō Railway (located in Narita Yume Bokujō) (operating); Tateyama Sabō Erosion Control Works Service Train (private) (operating)	2 ft (610 mm)
Laos	Don Det – Don Khon narrow gauge railway (converted to 1,000 mm (3 ft 3 3/8 in) metre gauge) (defunct)	600 mm (1 ft 11 5/8 in)
Latvia	Main article: Narrow-gauge railways in Latvia	600 mm (1 ft 11 5/8 in)
Lithuania	World War I military railways (converted to 750 mm (2 ft 5 1/2 in) gauge – Narrow-gauge railways in Lithuania) (operational status unknown)	600 mm (1 ft 11 5/8 in)
North Macedonia	Skopje – Ohrid line; 167 km (partially converted to standard gauge); Gradsko–Bitola (defunct)	600 mm (1 ft 11 5/8 in)
Madagascar	Sugar cane, industrial and military railways (defunct)	600 mm (1 ft 11 5/8 in)
Mauritius	A network of sugar cane railways (defunct)	600 mm (1 ft 11 5/8 in)
Mexico	Atlamaxac Railroad (converted to 2 ft 6 in (762 mm) and called the Zacatlán Railroad); Cazadero and San Pablo Railroad (defunct); Córdoba and Huatusco Railroad (defunct); Hornos Railroad (defunct)	2 ft (610 mm)
Mexico	Tacubaya Railroad (converted to standard gauge) (defunct)	600 mm (1 ft 11 5/8 in)
Montenegro	Podgorica–Plavnica railway (defunct)	600 mm (1 ft 11 5/8 in)
Morocco	Main article: History of rail transport in Morocco	600 mm (1 ft 11 5/8 in)
Mozambique	Beira Railroad Corporation (crosses into Zimbabwe) (converted to 3 ft 6 in (1,067 mm) gauge) (operating)	2 ft (610 mm)
Myanmar	Burma Mines Railway (operating)	2 ft (610 mm)
Namibia	Otavi Mining and Railway Company (converted to 3 ft 6 in (1,067 mm) gauge) (defunct); Swakopmund–Windhoek line (converted to 3 ft 6 in (1,067 mm) gauge) (operating)	600 mm (1 ft 11 5/8 in)
Nauru	Rail transport in Nauru (converted to 3 ft (914 mm) gauge) (operating)	2 ft (610 mm)
Netherlands	Efteling Steam Train Company (located in Efteling) (operating)	600 mm (1 ft 11 5/8 in)
New Zealand	Blenheim Riverside Railway (operating); Ferrymead Two Foot Railway (located in Ferrymead Heritage Park) (separate standard-gauge railway named Ferrymead Tramway and separate 3 ft 6 in (1,067 mm) gauge railway named Ferrymead Railway also present) (operating)	2 ft (610 mm)
Norway	Åmdals Verk Gruver; 0.6 km (operating); Gruvemuseet pa Litlabo (operating); Høyanger funicular (operating); Kristiansand Kanonmuseum (operating); Lommedalsbanen; 0.6 km (operating); Sulitjelma Besøksgruve (operating); Stiftelsen Konnerudverket; 0.5 km (operating)	600 mm (1 ft 11 5/8 in)
Palestine	Palestine Military Railway (1,050 mm (3 ft 5 11/32 in) lines also present) (defunct)	600 mm (1 ft 11 5/8 in)
Papua New Guinea	Plantation railways constructed during the German Colonial period (defunct)	600 mm (1 ft 11 5/8 in)
Pakistan	Changa Manga Forestry Railway (operating); Dandot Light Railway (operating); Khewra Salt Mines Railway (operating); Gangapur Tram (operating)	2 ft (610 mm)
Philippines	Manila–Dagupan Railway (operated within Manila yards c. 1907) (defunct)	600 mm (1 ft 11 5/8 in)
Poland	Main article: Narrow-gauge railways in Poland	600 mm (1 ft 11 5/8 in)
Portugal	Comboio da Praia do Barril (operating); Minicomboio da Caparica (operating)	600 mm (1 ft 11 5/8 in)
Puerto Rico	Mona Island Tramway, Mona Island, Mayagüez, Puerto Rico	600 mm (1 ft 11 5/8 in)
Rwanda	Régie d’Exploitation et de Développement des Mines (operational status unknown)	600 mm (1 ft 11 5/8 in)
Somalia	Decauville line between Villabruzzi and the Somalia-Ethiopia border (defunct)	600 mm (1 ft 11 5/8 in)
South Africa	Main article: Two-foot-gauge railways in South Africa	2 ft (610 mm)
South Korea	EcoLand Resort Forest Train (located in EcoLand Theme Park) (operating)	2 ft (610 mm)
Spain	Ferrocarril Turístic de l'Alt Llobregat; Funicular de Capdella; Funicular de Molinos (private) (operating); Tren Minero de Utrillas	600 mm (1 ft 11 5/8 in)
Sudan	Gezira Light Railway (operating)	2 ft (610 mm)
Sudan	Tokar–Trinkitat Light Railway (defunct)	600 mm (1 ft 11 5/8 in)
Sweden	Main article: Narrow-gauge railways in Sweden	600 mm (1 ft 11 5/8 in)
Switzerland	Bärschwil gypsum railway (defunct); Tramway Bellavista (defunct); Puschlaver Geisterbahn (operating); Rösslitram (located in Knie's Kinderzoo) (operating); Schinznacher Baumschulbahn; 3 km (operating)	600 mm (1 ft 11 5/8 in)
Taiwan	Nairobi Express (located in Leofoo Village Theme Park) (operating)	2 ft (610 mm)
Tanzania	Southern Province Railway (defunct)	2 ft (610 mm)
Thailand	Siam Park City Railway (closed)	2 ft (610 mm)
Togo	German colonial railway (defunct)	600 mm (1 ft 11 5/8 in)
Turkey	Palamutluk–Balya–Mancılık railway; A 600 mm gauge railway for the construction of the standard-gauge Baghdad Railway	600 mm (1 ft 11 5/8 in)
United Kingdom	Main article: 2 ft and 600 mm gauge railways in the United Kingdom	2 ft (610 mm); 1 ft 11 3/4 in (603 mm); 600 mm (1 ft 11 5/8 in); 1 ft 11 1/2 in (597 mm)
United States	Main article: 2 ft gauge railroads in the United States	2 ft (610 mm)
Zimbabwe	Shurugwi Peak Railway (operating)	2 ft (610 mm)

== See also ==
- Decauville
- Heritage railway
- Large amusement railways
- List of track gauges
- Minimum-gauge railway
