= Narrow-gauge railways in Lithuania =

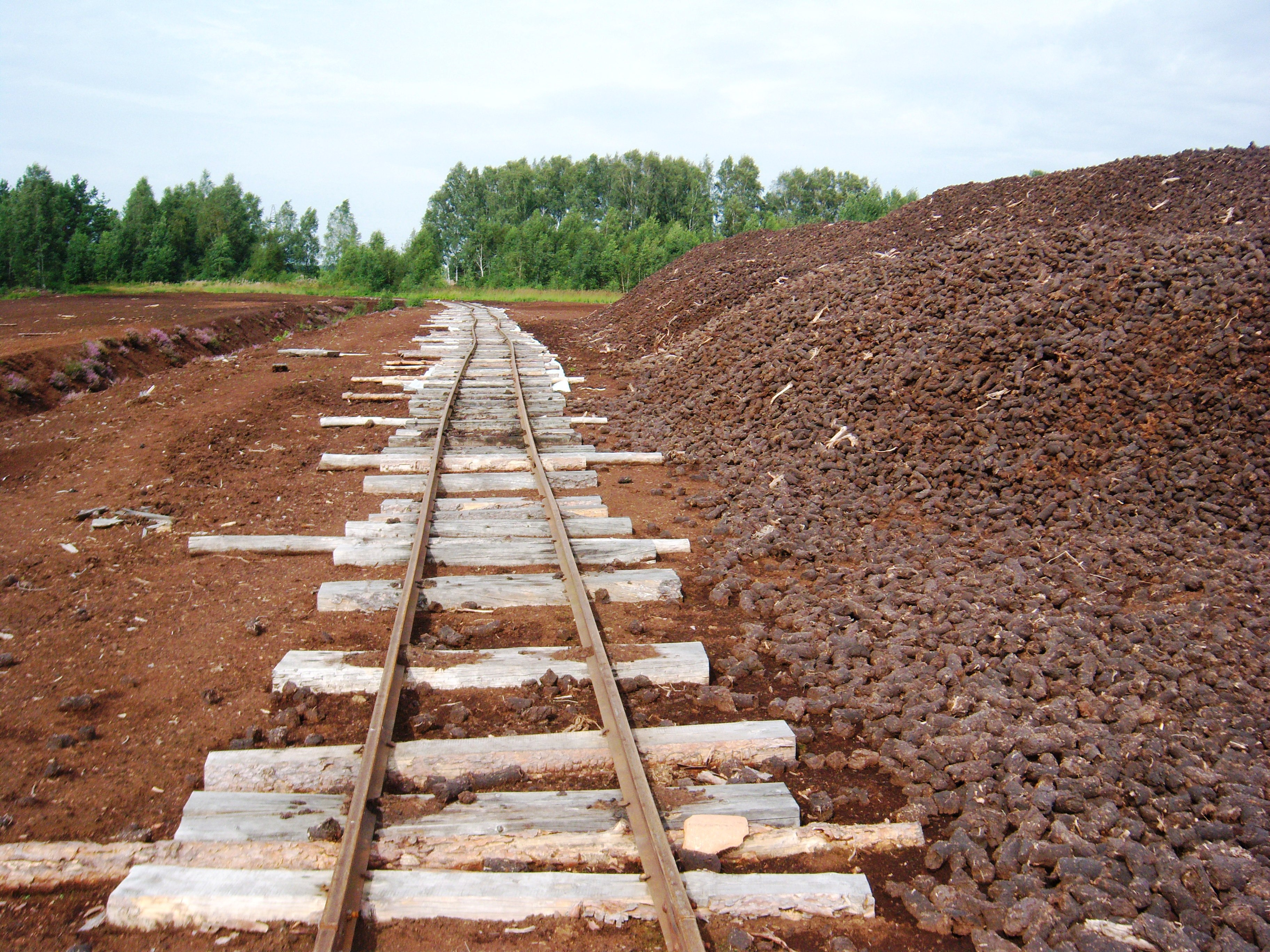

Lithuania has 158.8 km of 750 mm (2 ft 5 1/2 in) narrow-gauge railway lines remaining, although only 68.4 km of them (serving five stations) are regularly used, employing 12 locomotives. They are included in the Registry of Cultural Property of Lithuania.

== 750 mm (2 ft 5 1/2 in) gauge railways ==
- Švenčionėliai–Pastavy–Berezvetsh; 125 km opened in 1895. Most of the line was (and is now) in Belorussia. Švenčionėliai - Lyntupy stretch closed, Lyntypy - Berezvetch (Glubokoye) stretch regauged (1520 mm).
- Švenčionėliai–Panevėžys; 145 km, opened in 1901. Švenčionėliai - Utena stretch regauged (1520 mm), Utena - Rubikiai stretch dismantled, and Rubikiai - Panevėžys stretch still working.

== 600 mm (1 ft 11 5/8 in) gauge military railways ==
These railways were built during World War I by the German Empire at the gauge of 600 mm (1 ft 11 5/8 in), converted to 750 mm (2 ft 5 1/2 in) gauge by the Lithuanian state railways, and expanded to a network of 111 km.

- Panevėžys–Joniškėlis; 36 km
- Joniškėlis–Biržai; 42 km
- Joniškėlis–Žeimelis; 37 km
- Joniškėlis–Petrašiūnai (Pakruojis)–Šiauliai; 68 km
- Petrašiūnai (Pakruojis)–Linkuva; 7 km
- Joniškis-Žeimelis; 28 km, not converted to 750 mm gauge

World War I 600 mm (1 ft 11+5/8 in) field railway from Dūkštas, (Lithuania) to Druja. After takeover by Poland, the PKP regauged the line to 750 mm (2 ft 5+1/2 in) in 1932. After World War II the large part of the line was in Belarus, the railway closed in the 1970s.

== Other ==
- Vilnius pioneer railway, 1,6 km in the Vingis Park in Vilnius
- There are also many peat factories, which have private narrow-gauge railways for transportation of peat from field to factory.

== See also ==
- Aukštaitija narrow gauge railway
