= Joniškėlis Manor =

Coordinates: 56°01′53″N 24°09′51″E

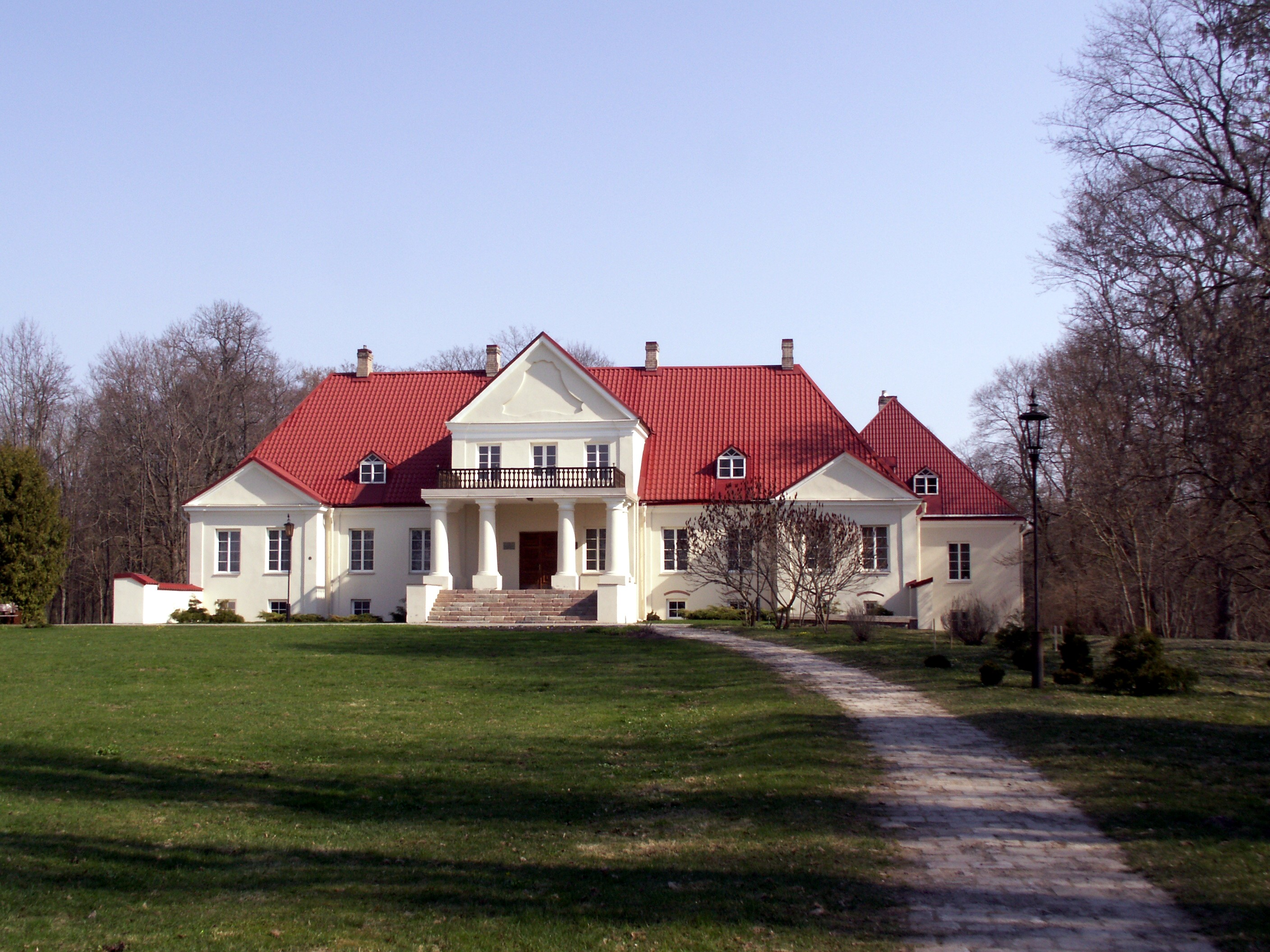
Joniškėlis Manor

Joniškėlis Manor is a former residential manor in Joniškėlis. It is one of the biggest buildings and parks ensemble in Zemgale. The manor grounds are currently used by Lithuanian Institute of Agriculture.

== Gallery ==
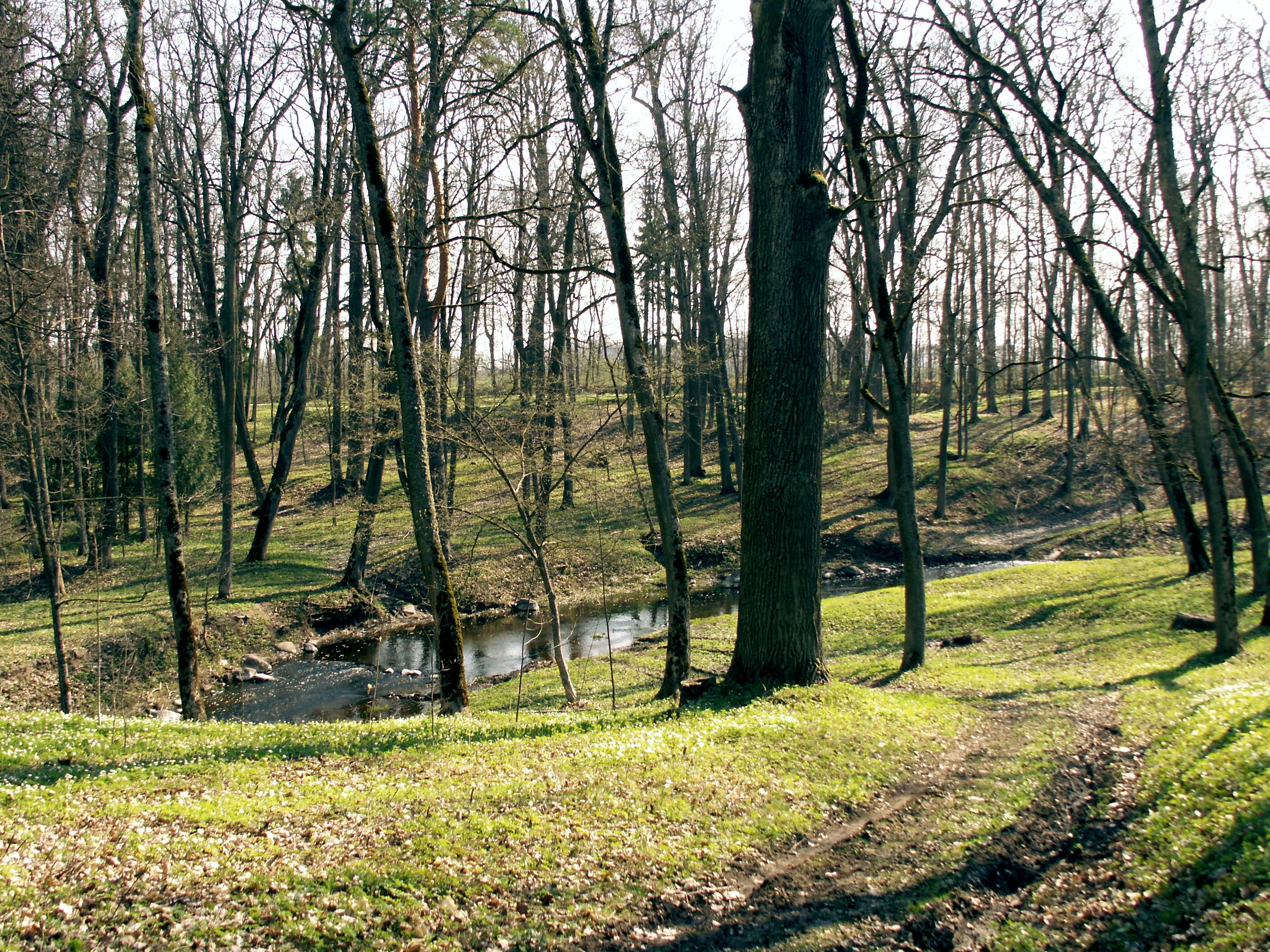
Mažupis valley

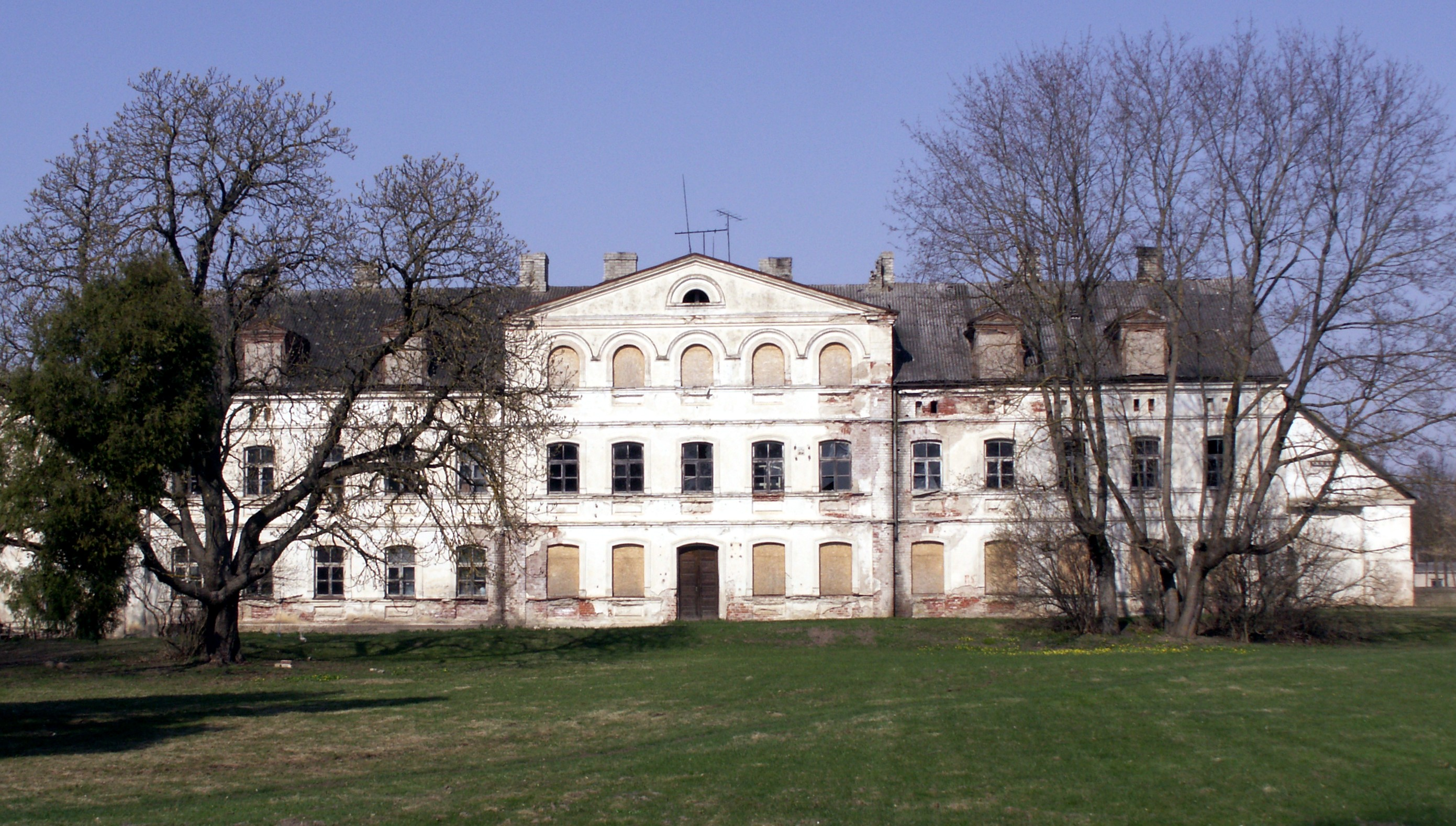
Manor buildings

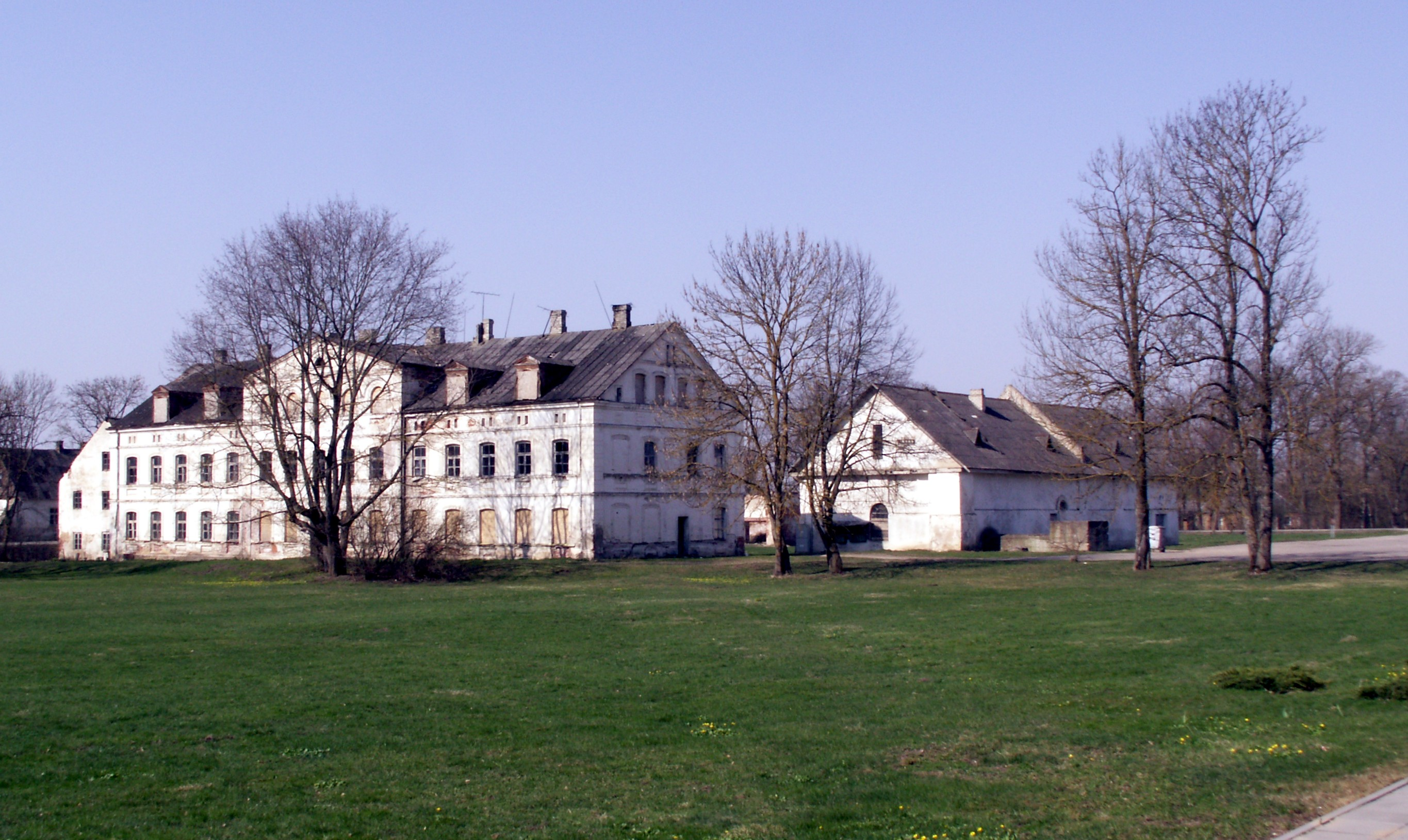
Manor buildings

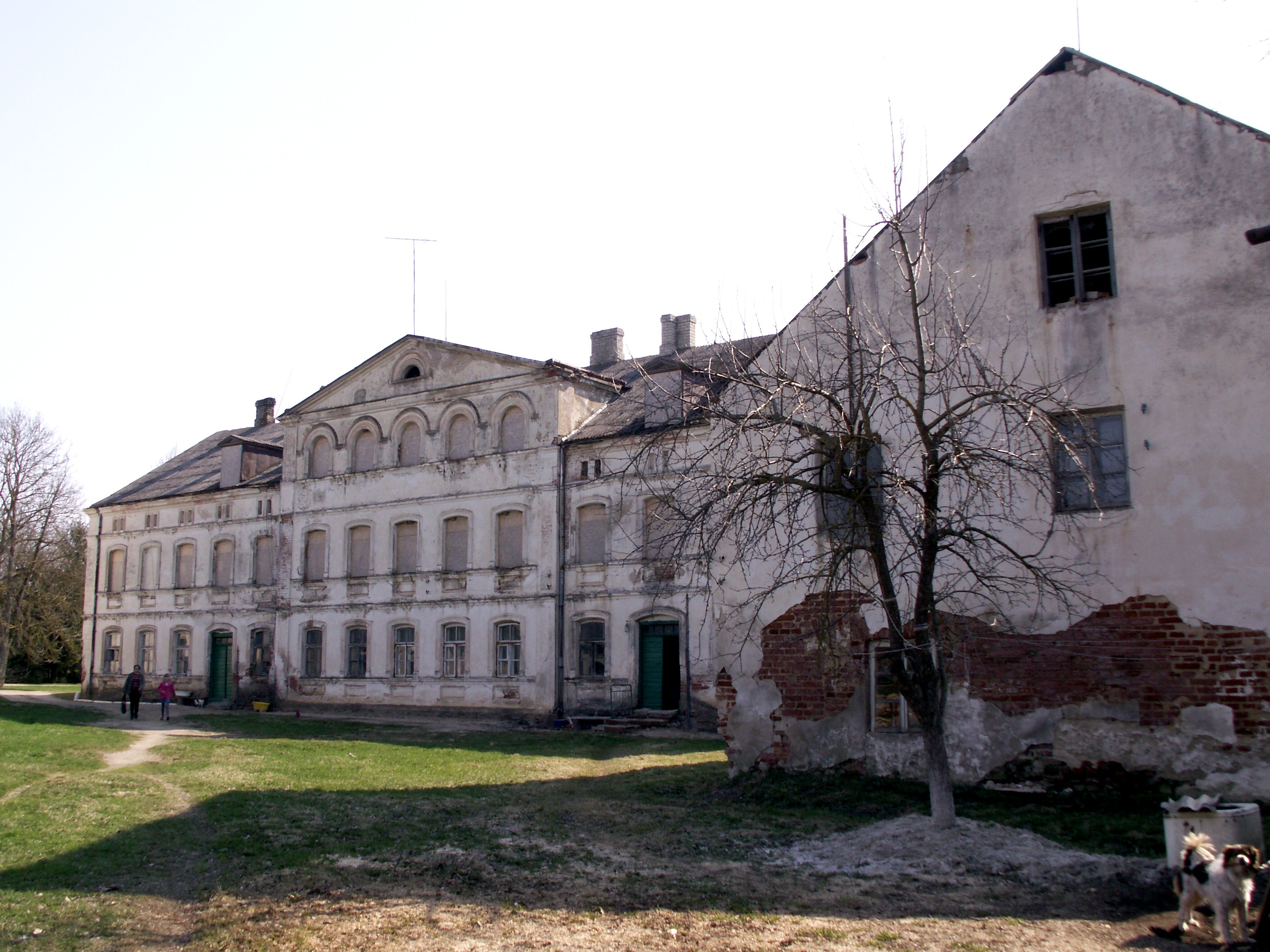
Manor buildings
