= Siam Park City Railway =

Miniature railway in Bangkok, Thailand

Coordinates: 13.805675°N 100.693003°E

Siam Amazing Park Railway
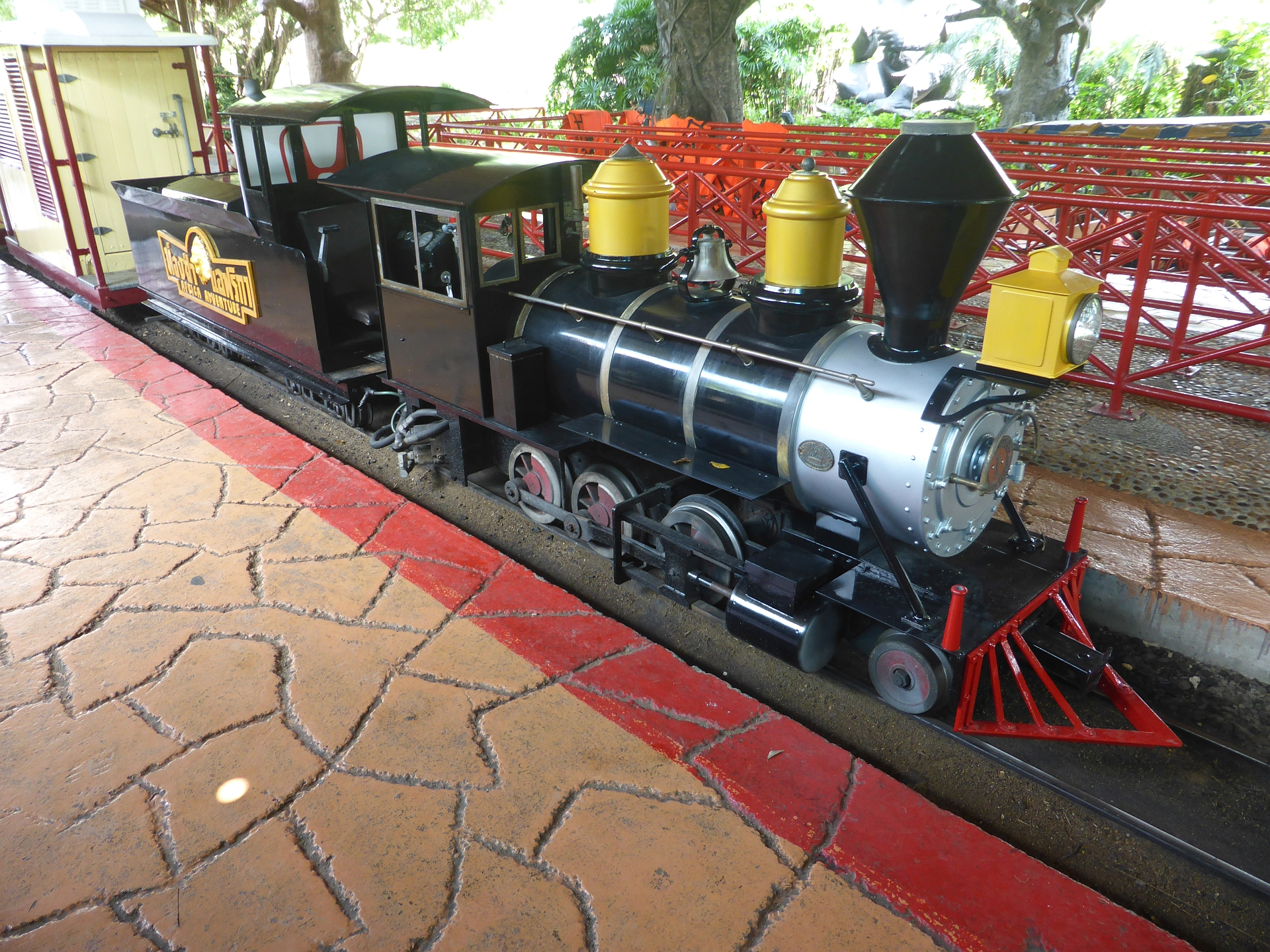
- Africa Adventure train is now a new version of Siam Amazing Park Railway

Overview
- Locale: Siam Amazing Park

Technical
- Track gauge: 2 ft (610 mm)

Other
- Website: https://www.siamamazingpark.com/en/amazing-detail/37/Africa-Adventure

Siam Amazing Park Railway is a former miniature railway at Siam Park City in Bangkok.

== Infrastructure ==
Siam Park City (Thai: สวนสยาม; RTGS: Suan Sayam) is an amusement and water park in the Khan Na Yao district of Bangkok, Thailand. It opened in November 1980. For the transport of visitors a miniature railway in the way of a light railway was installed. The line was built in a broad circuit around the area. Due to old maps, an old photograph and some still existing tracks (as seen in September 2016), it is certain that the railroad line left the inner terrain of the park at least in the southbound section behind and circled the waterpark installations. In a northward direction the still existing tracks end nowadays in front of the Dinotopia attraction. The line was a single-way track with, had a gauge of 2 ft, several sidings and served some stop stations. The storage sidings for the units, hauled by a diesel locomotive, were behind the present-day attraction Log Flume.

== Rolling stock ==
In 1966 four identical locomotives of type DS40/1 were delivered from the German Diepholzer Maschinenfabrik Fritz Schöttler (Diema) with the serial numbers from 2886 to 2889 to Union Development Co. Ltd., Bangkok. Overall Diema built 25 locomotives of this type. These four engines were overtaken by the park railway, numbered as 1 to 4 - not following the order of the serial numbers. After its closure they were still dumped until today at the former, roofed storage sidings. Diema delivered a total of just six locomotives to Thailand, all of them are preserved so far, besides this four mentioned engines two other locomotives still exist at a sugar factory in Ko Kha as a monument. A railway unit consisted of five covered coaches with two axles. In the 1990s they were replaced by a newer construction once more - labeled with "Siam Park Transportation Company".

== Gallery ==
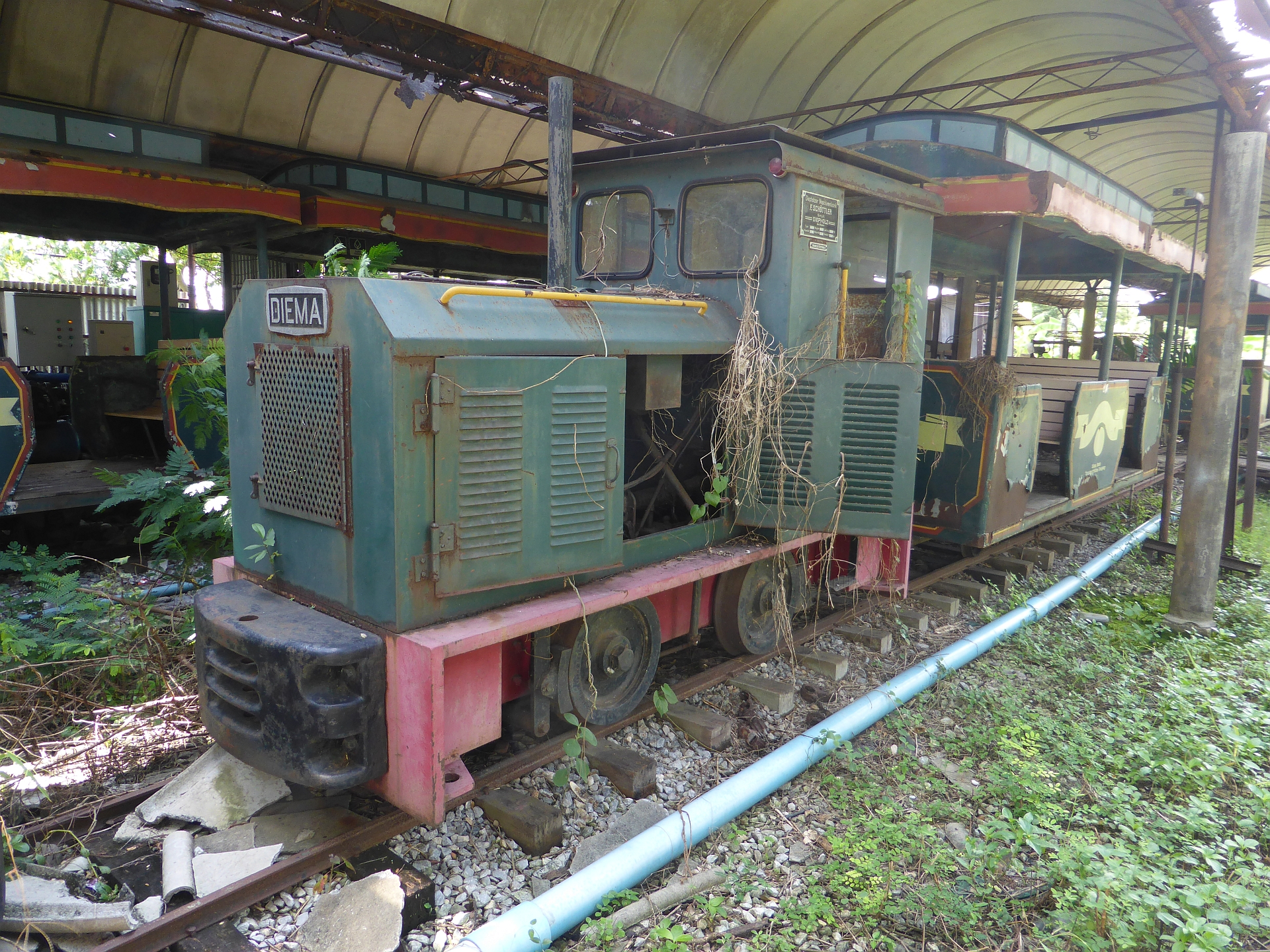

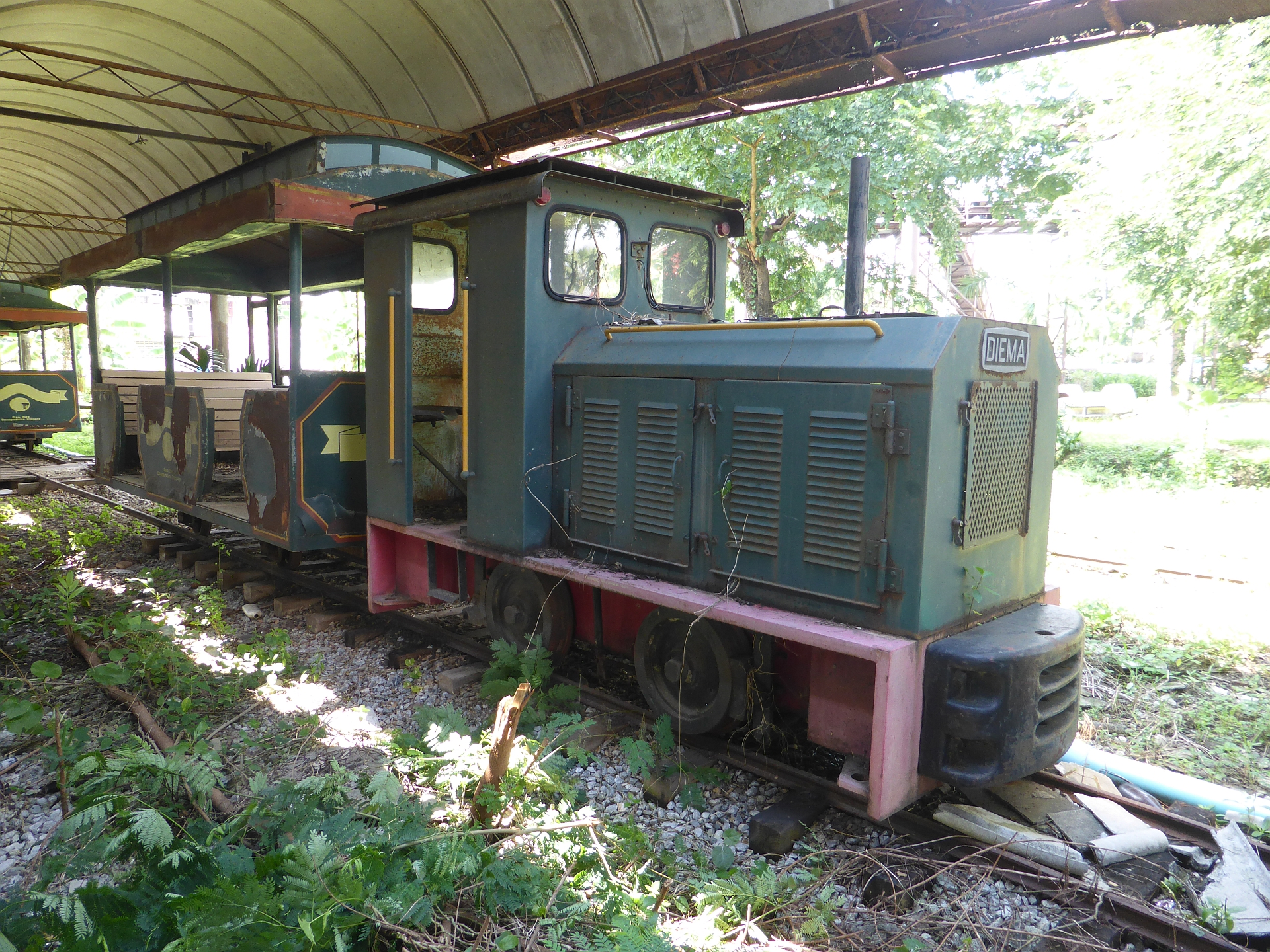

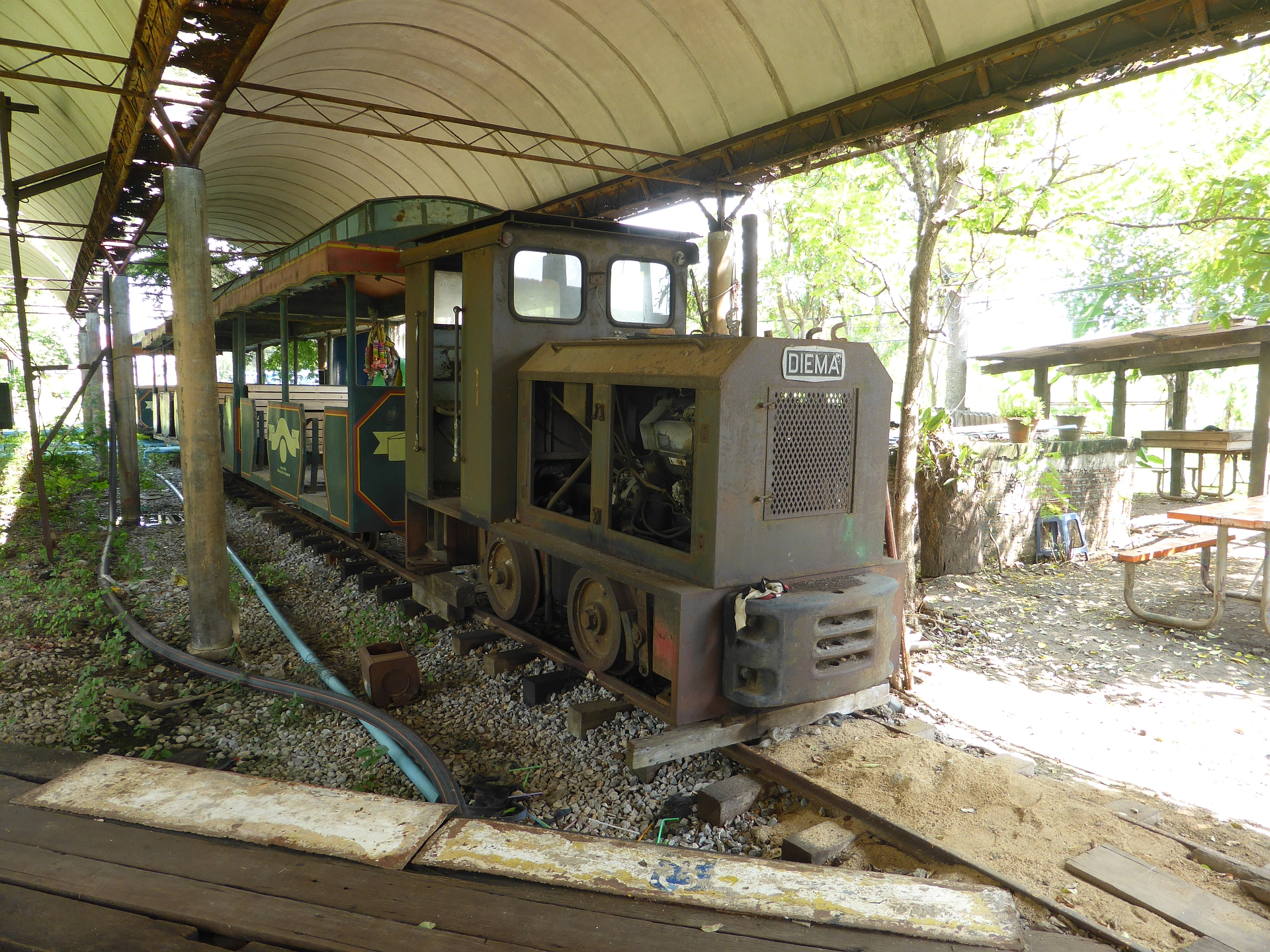

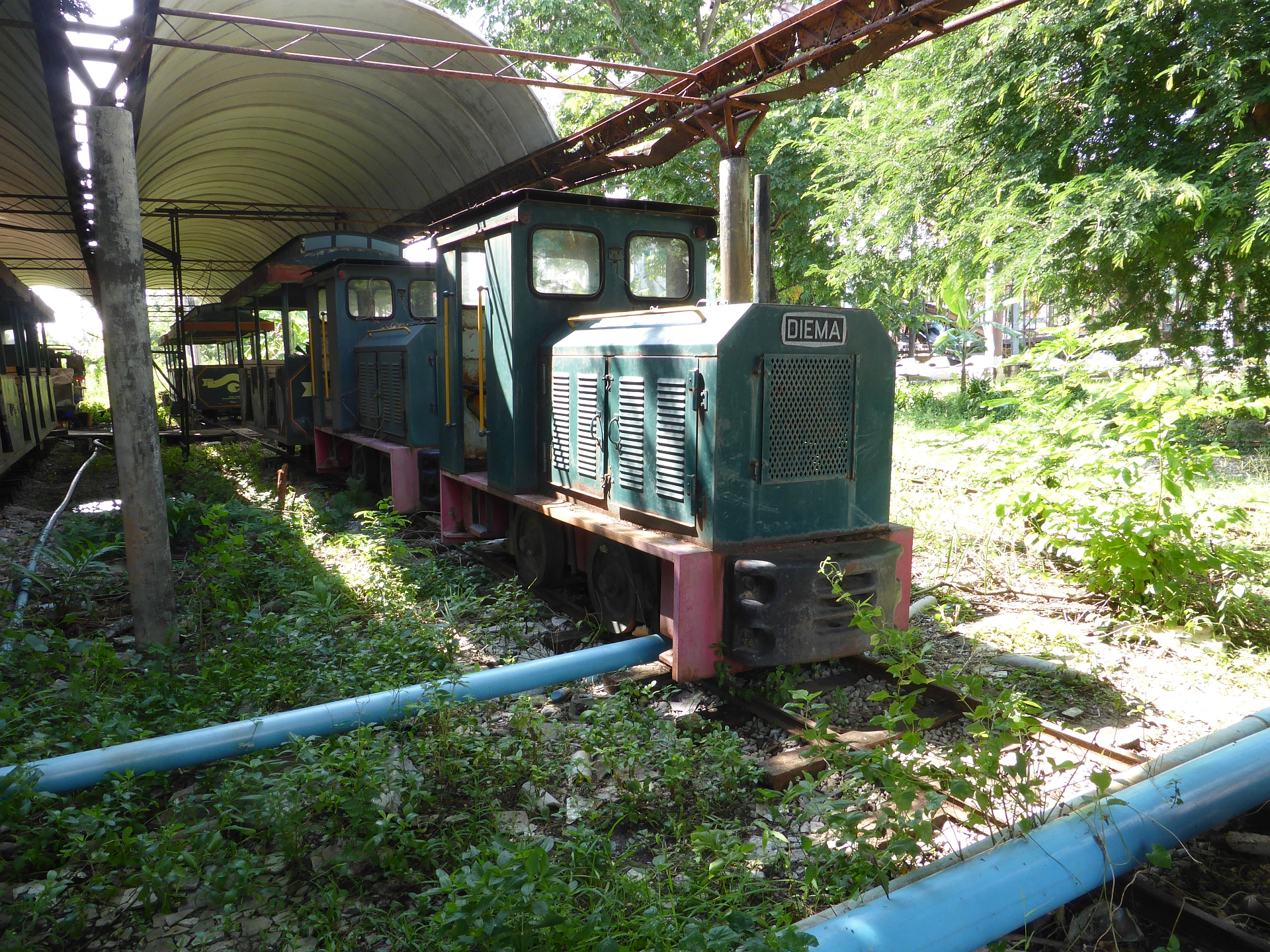

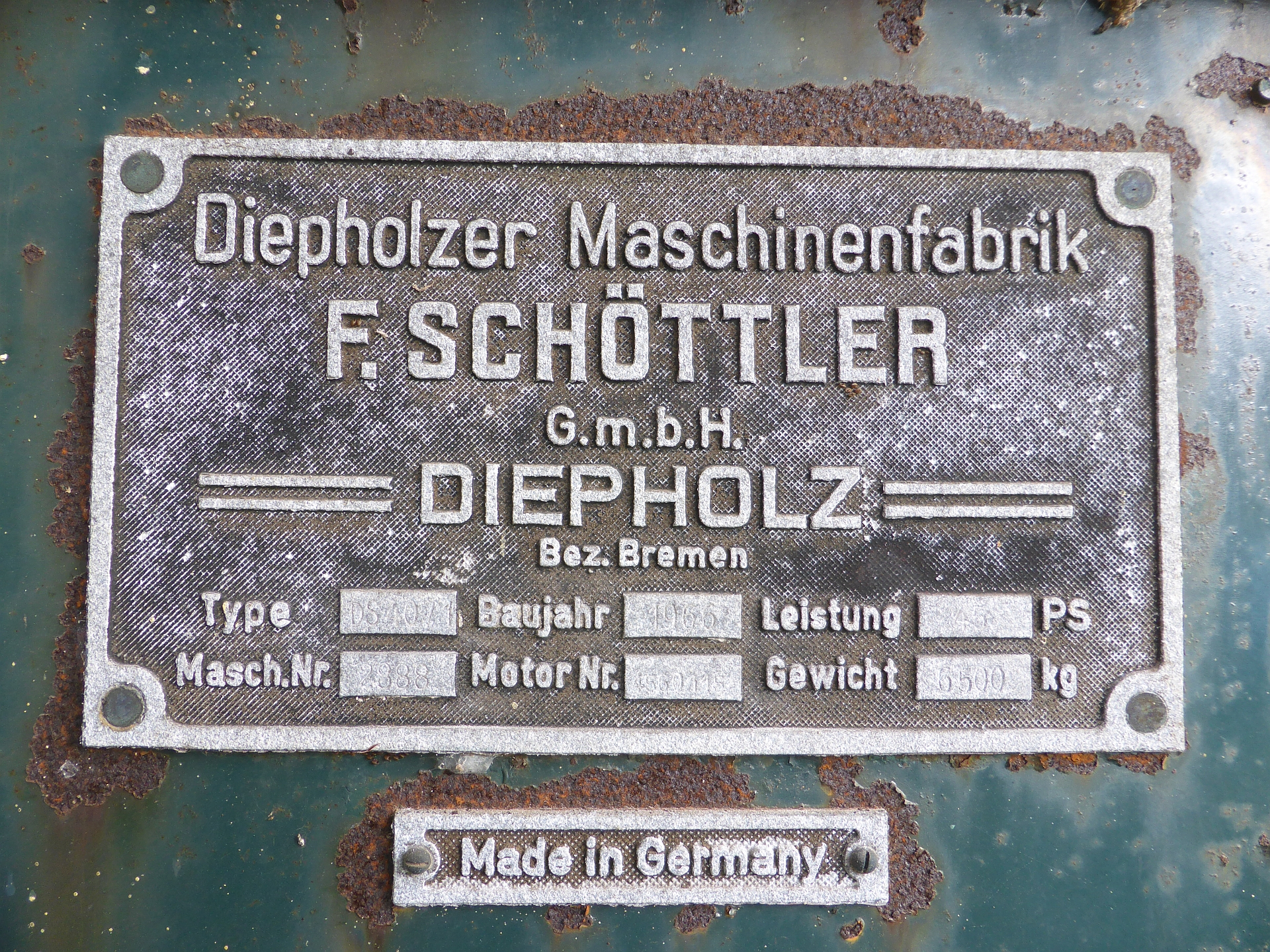

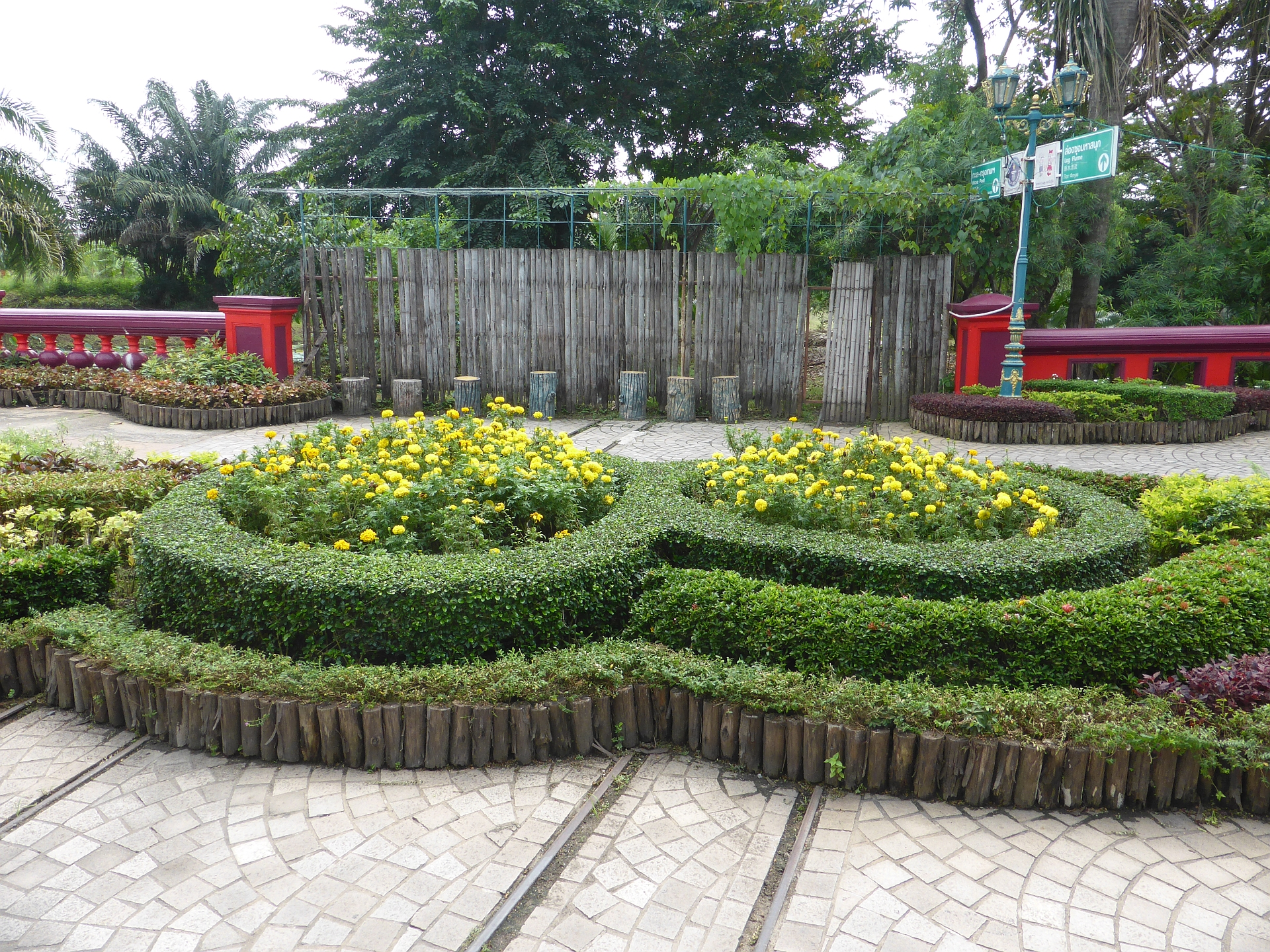

== Africa Adventure Railway ==
Africa Adventure is a new, younger attraction in the northeastern extension area of the park. An island where you can observe Animatronics of African animals and sceneries can be circled by way of boat or railway. A short miniature railway - about only as long as 600 meters - was installed and runs in an ovalness along the island. The railway was equipped with locomotives constructed by Severn Lamb of Warwickshire. The locomotives themselves are only dummies, a standard combustion engine is mounted as power unit in the tender.
