= Narrow-gauge railways in Bulgaria =

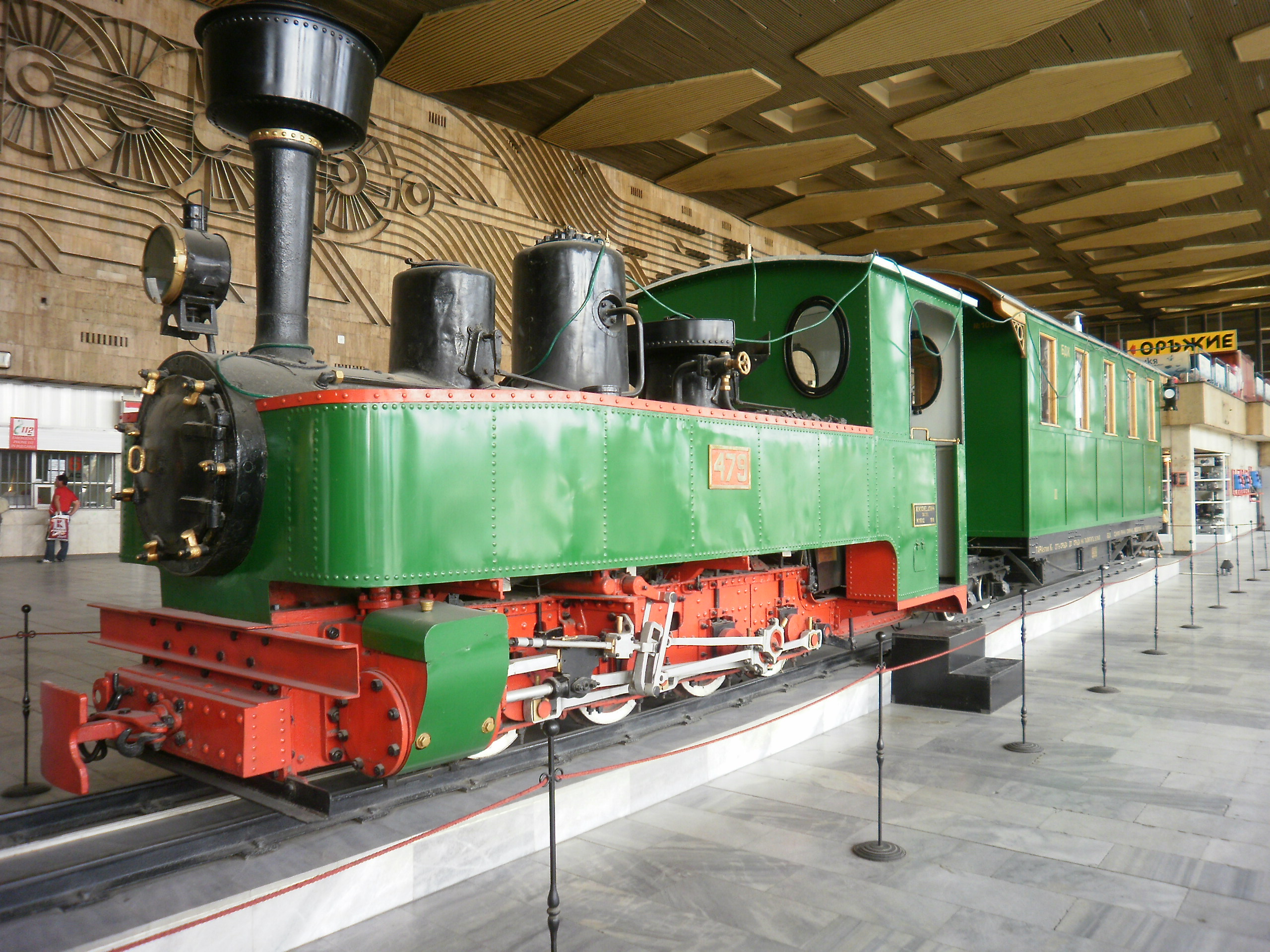
Henschel locomotive of 1918, БДЖ-No479, and railroad car served the main Bulgarian narrow-gauge railway line Radomir–Sidirokastro (Struma valley). Exhibit in Sofia Central rail station, 2001.

From the 19th into the early 20th there were many 600 mm (1 ft 11 5/8 in) and 760 mm (2 ft 5 15/16 in) gauge railways in existence Bulgaria, some were dismantled and others were converted to standard gauge.

== Septemvri–Dobrinishte ==
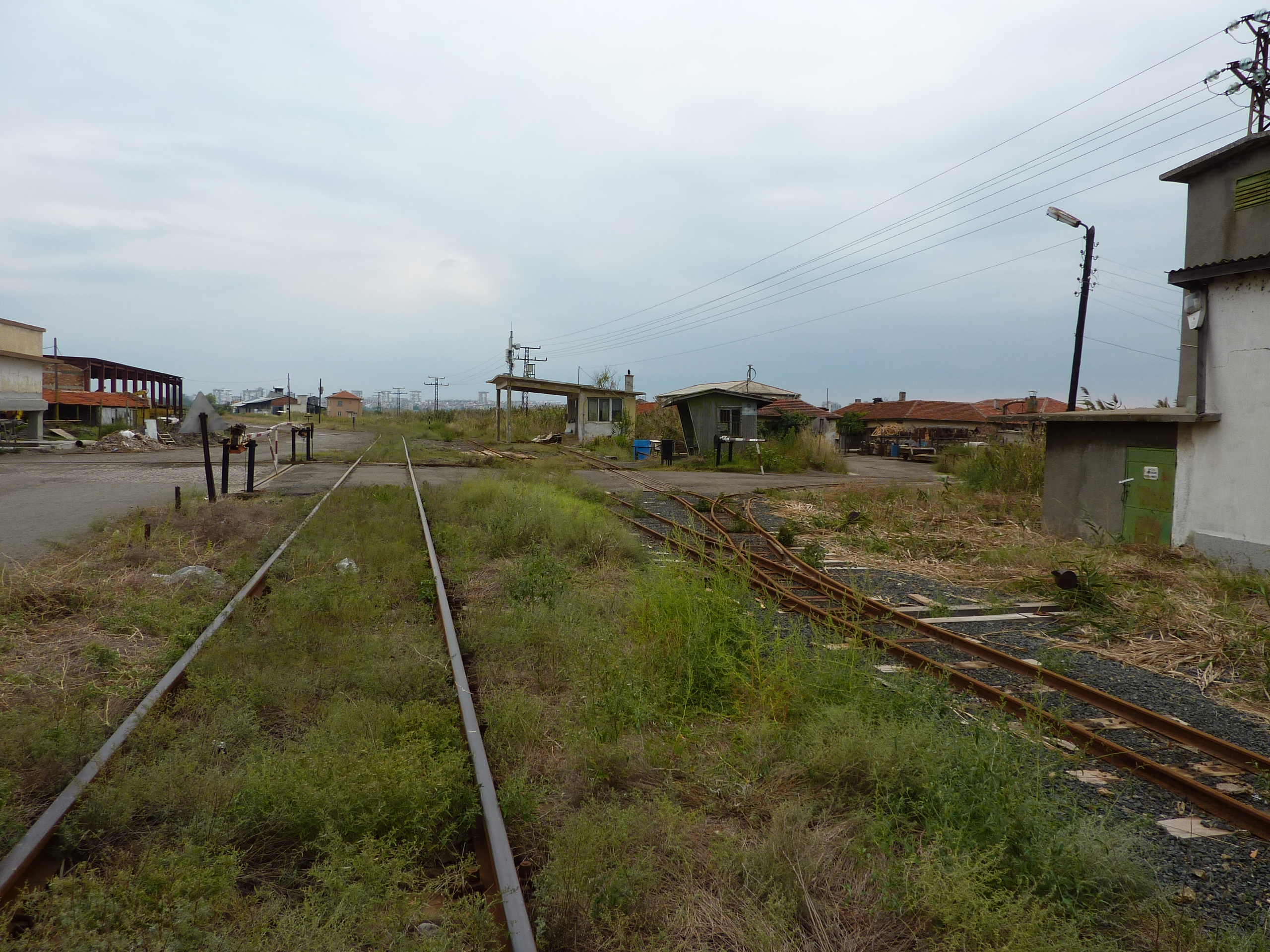
Standard-gauge (left) and narrow-gauge (right) tracks at the Bourgas Salt Works

The picturesque 760 mm (2 ft 5 15/16 in) Septemvri–Dobrinishte narrow-gauge line is 125 km long and features many tunnels, bridges, spiral loops and the highest railway station in the Balkans, namely Avramovo Station situated at 1267 m altitude. The line is still used for regional services by no less than 5 pairs of diesel-hauled trains per day as of the 2011 Timetable. There are a couple of preserved steam locomotives, but as of 2010 only 609.76 is operational and occasionally hauls tourist trains along the line. There are plans for restoration of the other preserved engines, but when would this happen is still unclear.

== Other railways ==
Other examples in Bulgaria include the 600 mm (1 ft 11 5/8 in) children railways in Plovdiv and Kurdzhali and the industrial railway of the Burgas salt pans.

The greater part of the extensive Sofia Tramway network is 1,009 mm (3 ft 3 23/32 in) metre gauge.

== See also ==
- Rail transport in Bulgaria
- List of railway lines in Bulgaria
