= Puente Alto-El Volcán Railway =

Railway in Chile

Puente Alto–El Volcán Railway
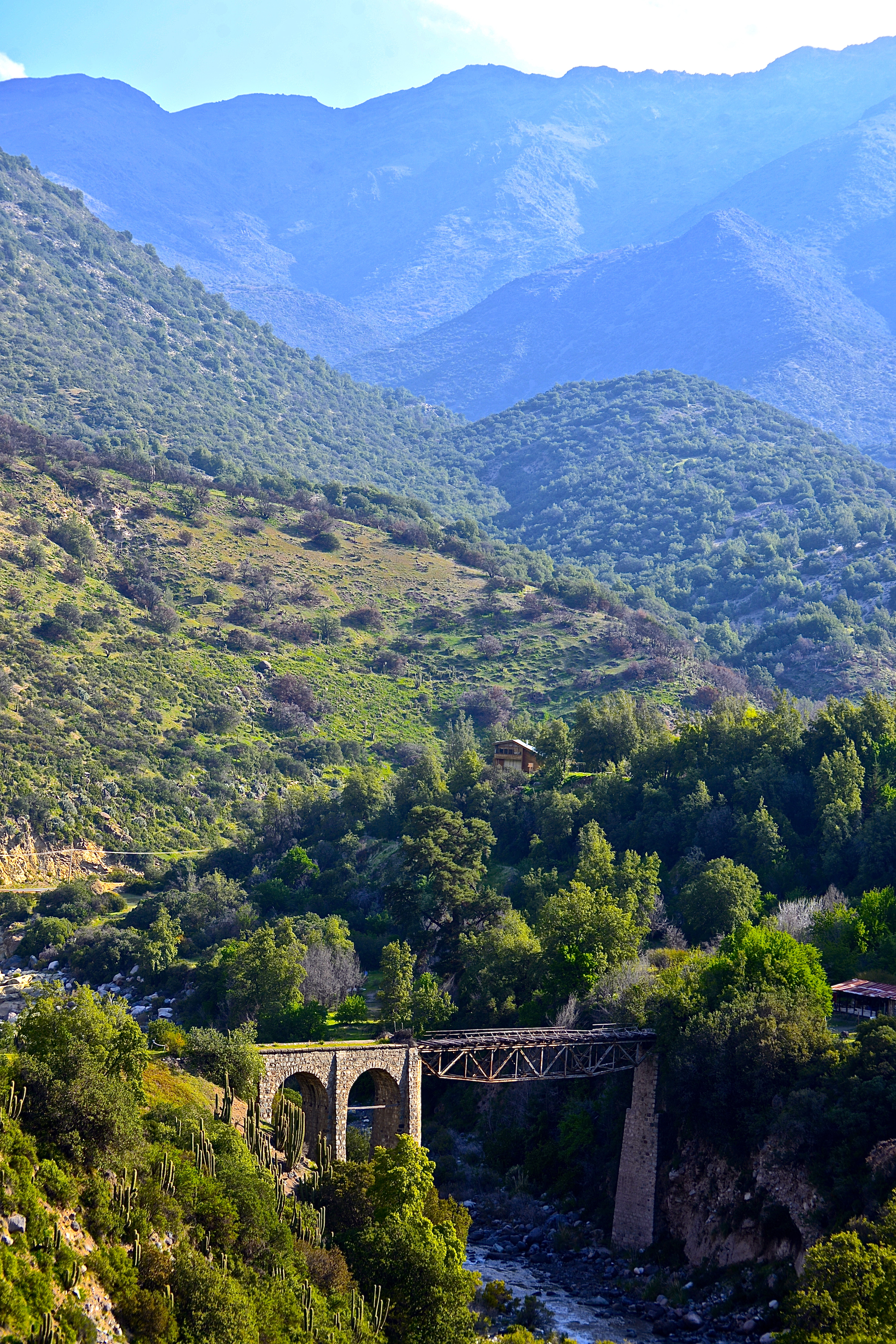
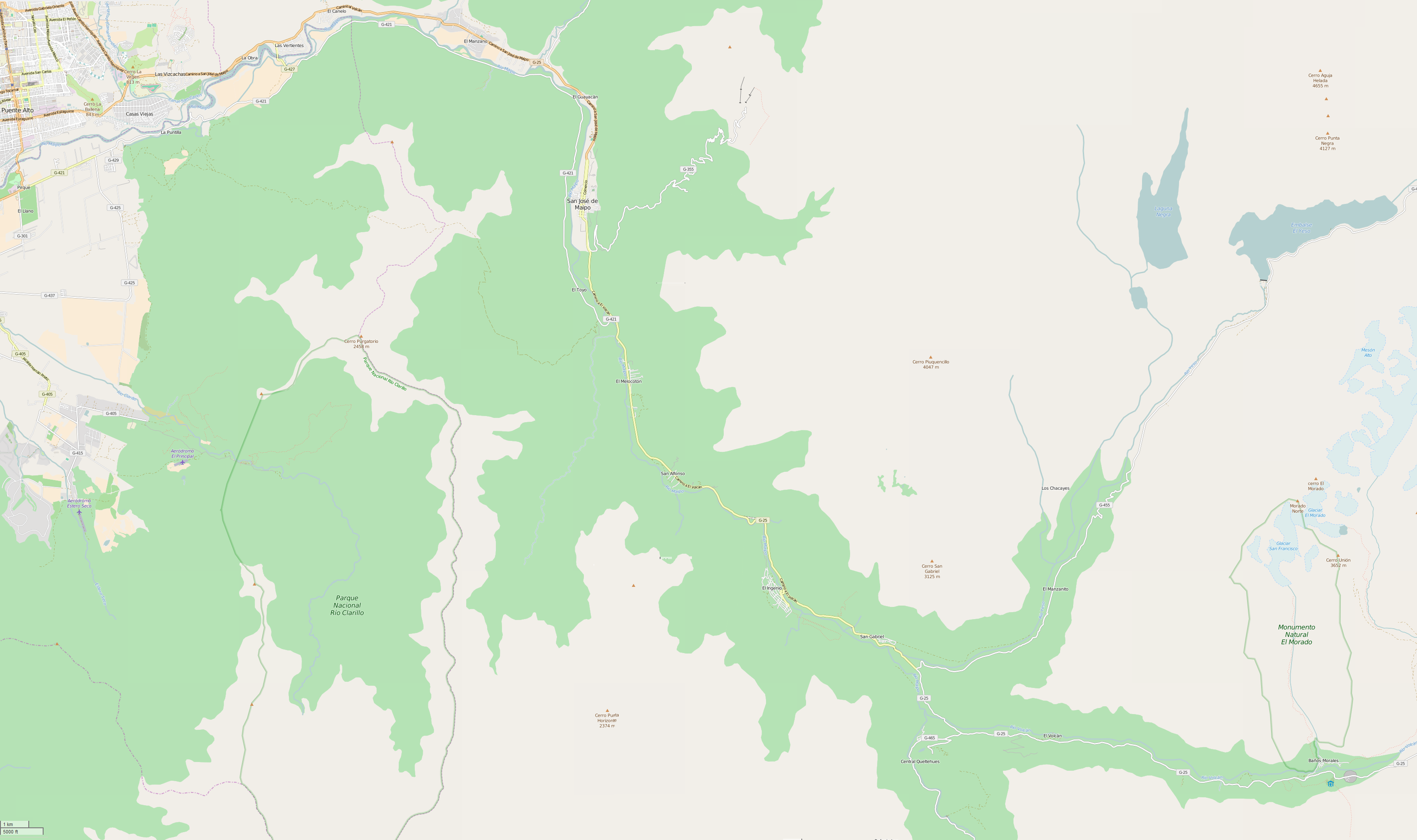
- Rail bridge over the Río Colorado in the Cajon del Maipo Map of the Maipo River. The railway ran between Puente Alto, located in the extreme top-left corner, towards El Volcán, located near the end of the valley in the bottom-right of the image.

Overview
- Native name: Ferrocarril Militar de Puente Alto al Volcán

Technical
- Line length: 60 km
- Track gauge: 600 mm

The Puente Alto-El Volcán Railway was a small military railway between Puente Alto and the outpost of El Volcán in Chile. The railway had a narrow gauge of 600 mm (1 ft 11 5/8 in), and was constructed in 1906 under Chile's Ministry of Railways. It was opened in gradual phases: on March 1, 1910 (from Puento Alto to El Canelo); in 1911 (from El Canelo to El Melocotón); and on June 9, 1914 (from El Melocotón to El Volcan). The railway was built at a cost of $2,335,630 and remained operational until 1985.

== Planning ==
=== Objectives ===
The railway's main objective was not to unite Chile and Argentina (as claimed by Chile), but to monitor the border and prevent any attacks from Argentina on Chile. Originally, when the State Railway Company commissioned an engineer to explore the area (who recommended the railway's construction), the idea was not taken seriously due to the lack of interest shown by the Chilean and Argentine governments. However, once the Military expressed the importance of this railway as a means of defence against a possible conflict, the Chilean government authorized its construction.

Its functions were to ensure practical training of military personnel and to provide strategic protection of the mountain passes. The military was responsible for the operation, management and repair of the railway.

=== Engineering Studies ===
Multiple studies were performed before the development of the railway:

1. In 1895, the Chilean engineer Alberto Lira Orrego studied the part of the road between Puente Alto and San Jose.
2. In 1899, there were reconnaissance missions covering the Maipo River to its source.
3. In 1901, the English engineer Josias Harding established that the route via the Maipo River was the most appropriate one
4. In 1902, the Chilean engineer Santiago Muñoz issued a report noting the enormous benefits that the railway would bring to the whole community, both in agriculture and trade (paper mills, coal, and tissues).

=== Responsibilities ===
The State Railway Administration mainly supervised the desk work done before the construction (for example, making the inventory of material required for the construction and operation, regulations and cost estimates), though their decisions were subject to approval by many others (including the Ministry of Railways, the Army, the Ministry of Public Works and later the State Railway Company).

== Operation ==
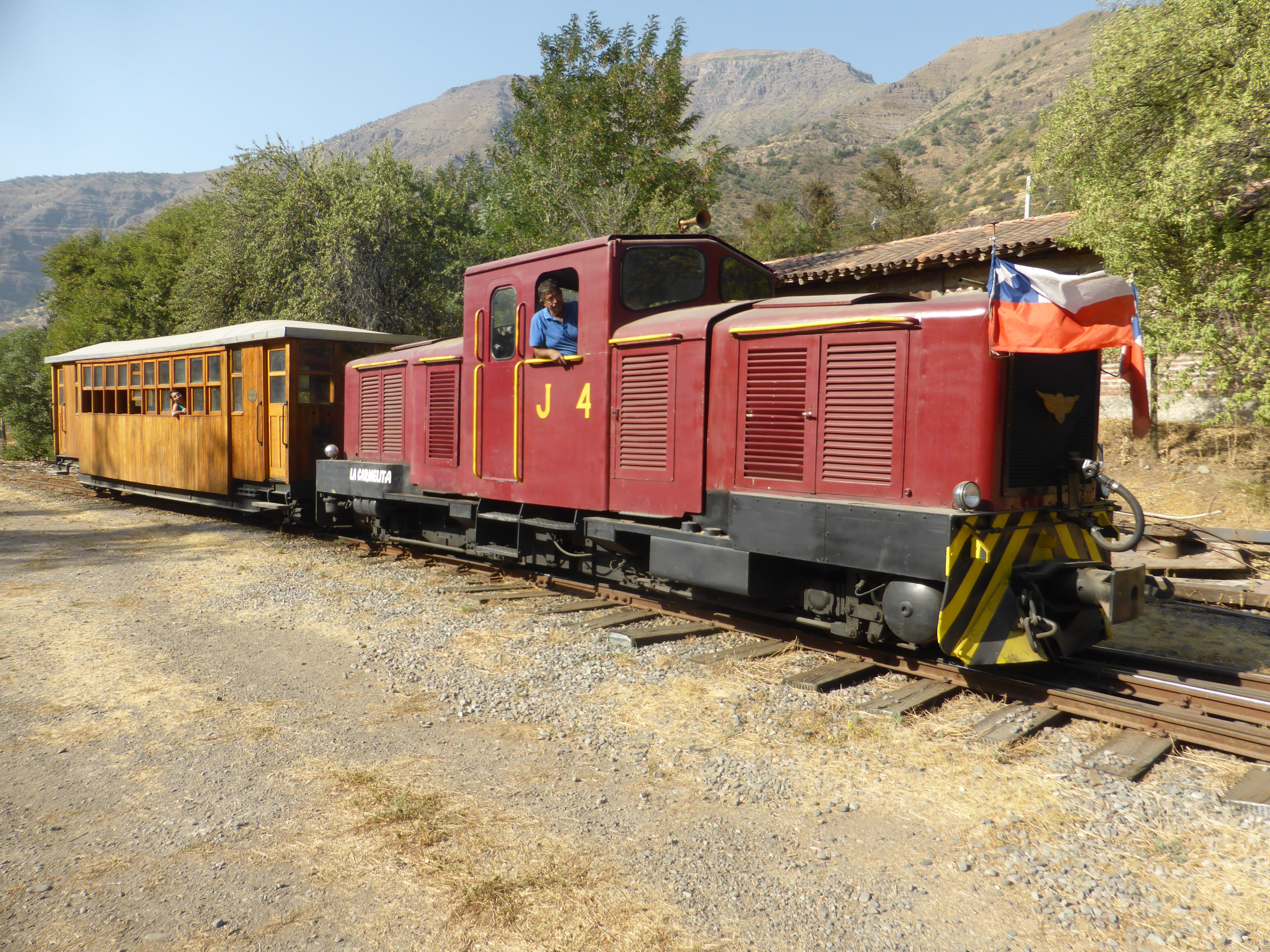
Diesel Locomotive Jung, J 4, Patrimonial Train of Cajón del Maipo, Santiago Metropolitan Region, Chile

At first, the engines used to test the line were small German locomotives made by Koppel. These pulled flat bed and freight cars, narrow passenger cars made of wood, or sometimes a small buscarril.

As the train traveled on very steep terrain, the size of those German locomotives was sometimes insufficient for the climb. Therefore, in some cases, more than one engine was used; one at the front pulling the train and another at the back pushing the train. In other cases, just one small but powerful locomotive was used to push a shorter train up the slope.

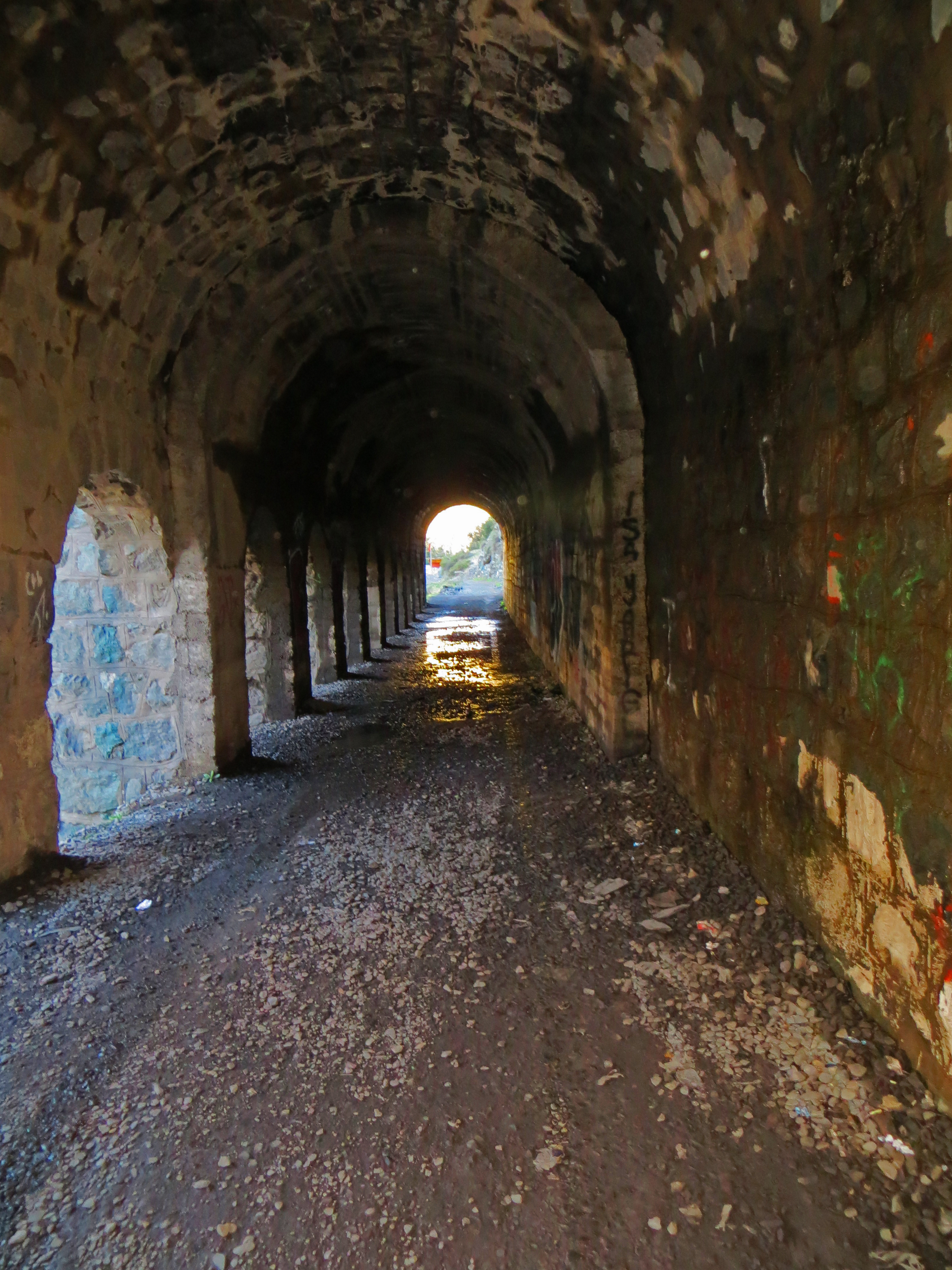
El Tinoco Tunnel

Transporting copper concentrate, gypsum and limestone, livestock and agricultural products by train became safer and more economical. Railway passenger traffic from Cajon del Maipo and Santiago also started, thanks to those services, with the main intent being going on vacation in the Andean villages in the mountains.

It took 45 minutes for the 13.5 km journey from Puente Alto to El Canelo by steam train, 2 hours for the 35.8 km journey to El Melocotón, and 3½ hours for the 61.9 km journey to the terminus at El Volcán.

== Closure ==
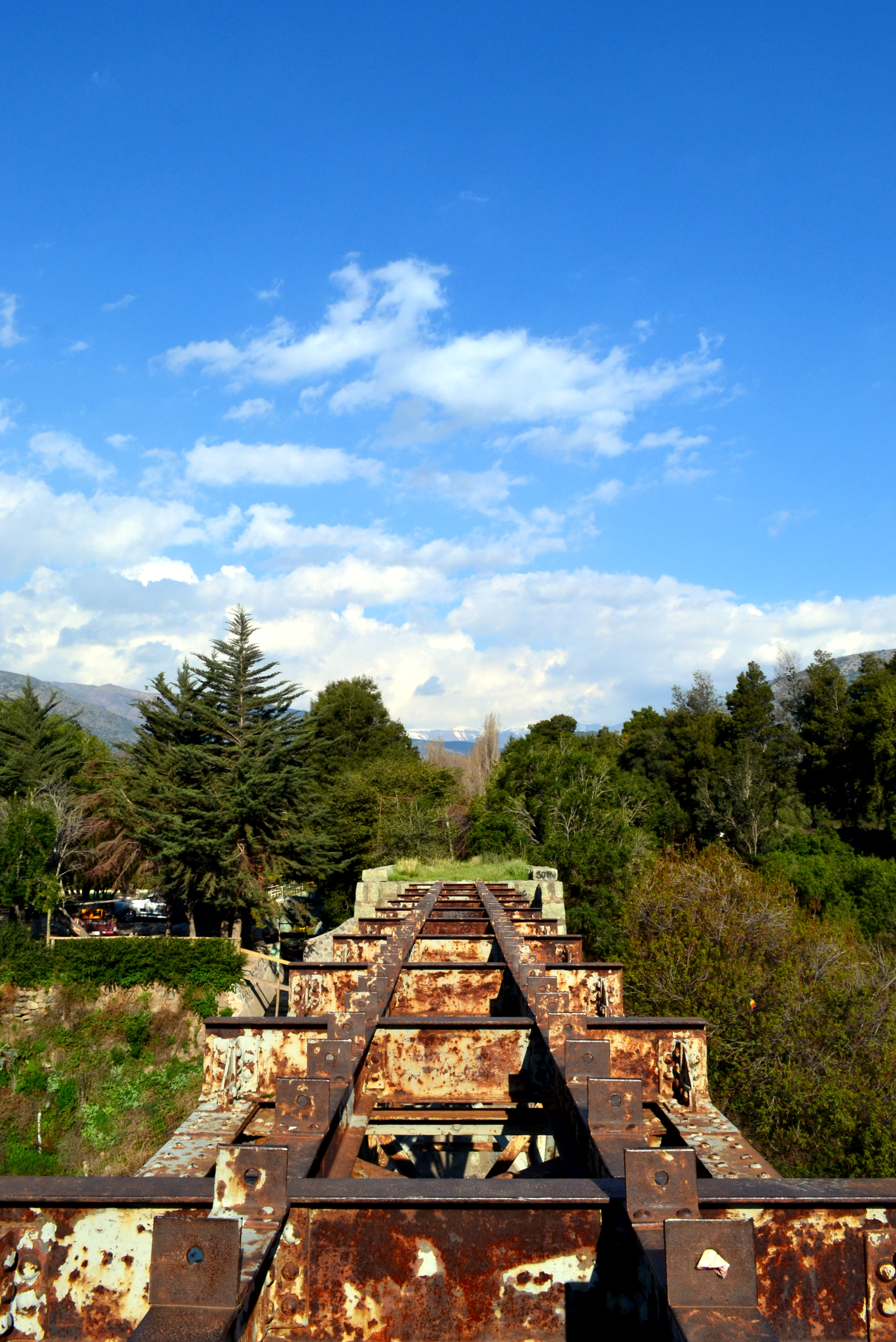
Abandoned bridge

Since 1950 the use of the railway decreased as rail transport began to be replaced by higher tonnage road trucks, whose travel time and freight costs were lower. Many factors led to the suspension of the railway and the use of roads as the main form of transport: the closure of Llano del Maipo Railway in the late 1940s, the earthquake in Las Melosas in 1958 (which caused damage to infrastructure), severe storms in the mid-1960s and the end of mining activity in the Volcano in 1976.

In 1978, with the approval of the policy of self-financing State Railway, the railway ceased regular public use, maintaining only internal operations for investigation. Jung diesel locomotives were delivered a few months before the closure, but too late to show their benefits.

In 1985 the railway was closed, after seventy years of operation. The railway was dismantled by order of the Ministry of Public Works and carried out by the same men who drove the locomotives. The abrupt manner in which the procedures occurred remained in the memory of the inhabitants of the area.

== Heritage status ==
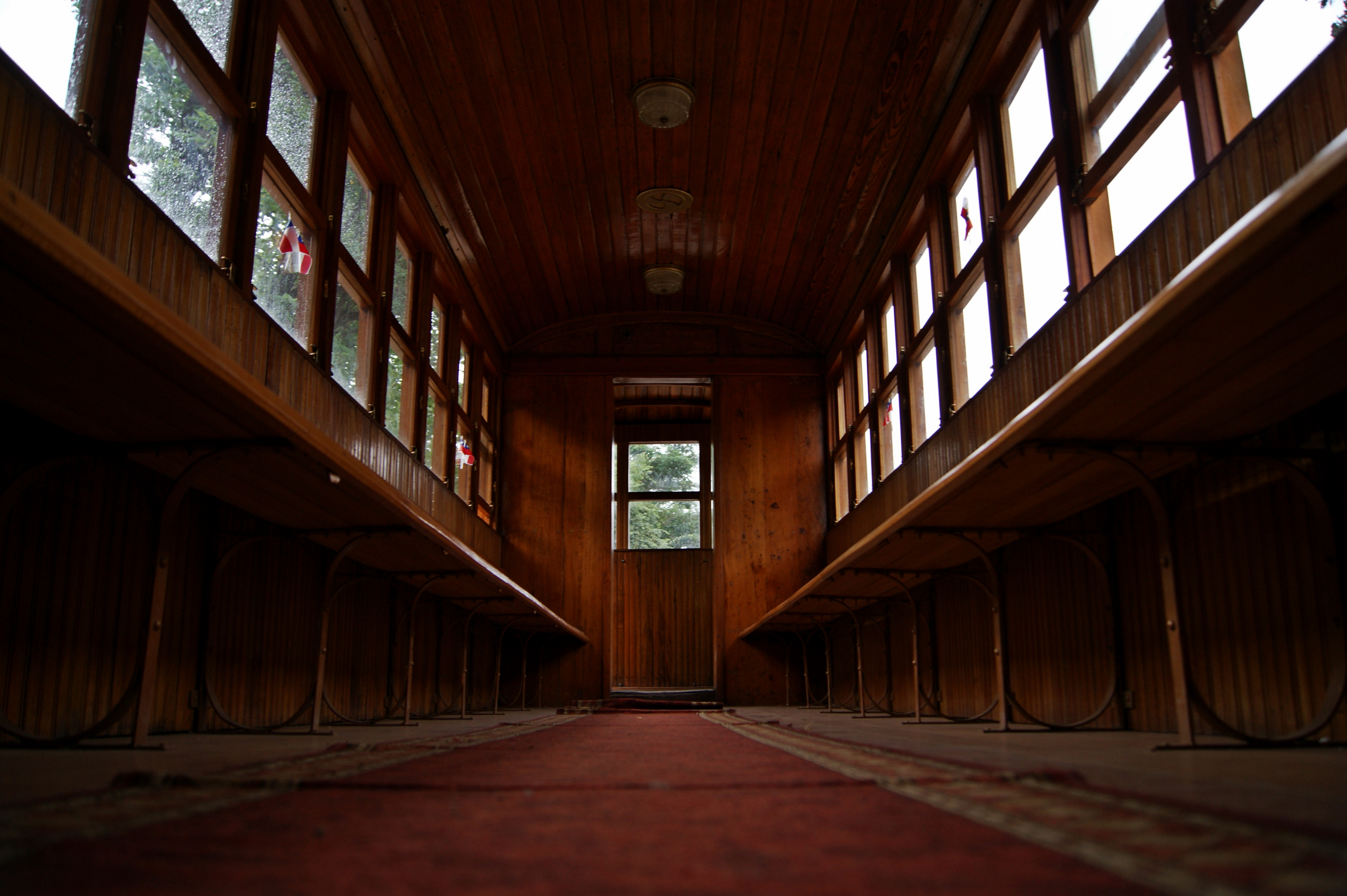
Interior of a wooden carriage at El Melocotón Station

The railway and its associated infrastructure were declared a National Historic Landmark by the Ministry of Education's Decree No. 432 in 1991. From that date, a series of restorations of the tracks and stations were performed. An agreement made in 2002 between the Chilean Army, the National Tourism Service (SERNATUR), the National History Museum, the Ministry of National Heritage, the National Monuments Council and a handful of volunteers and former operators of the railway, was signed for the implementation of a restoration project on the grounds of the former 'El Melocotón' station, named 'Proyecto Ave Fénix' ('Project Phoenix Bird' in Spanish), in order to build a cultural center that would include the Museum of Military Railways that would eventually see the former station building, sheds and yard tracks rebuilt. By the end of 2004, after the closure of Puente Alto Regiment, the steam locomotive "La Panchita", together with some cars, trucks and three diesel locomotives, were moved to El Melocotón station, where they currently reside; one of the diesel locomotives (J-4) has been restored, and regularly makes short trips around the station yard, pulling trains for visitors. The station is now a heritage railway run by volunteers, with a former driver being the director of the project.
