= Joniškėlis =

- City
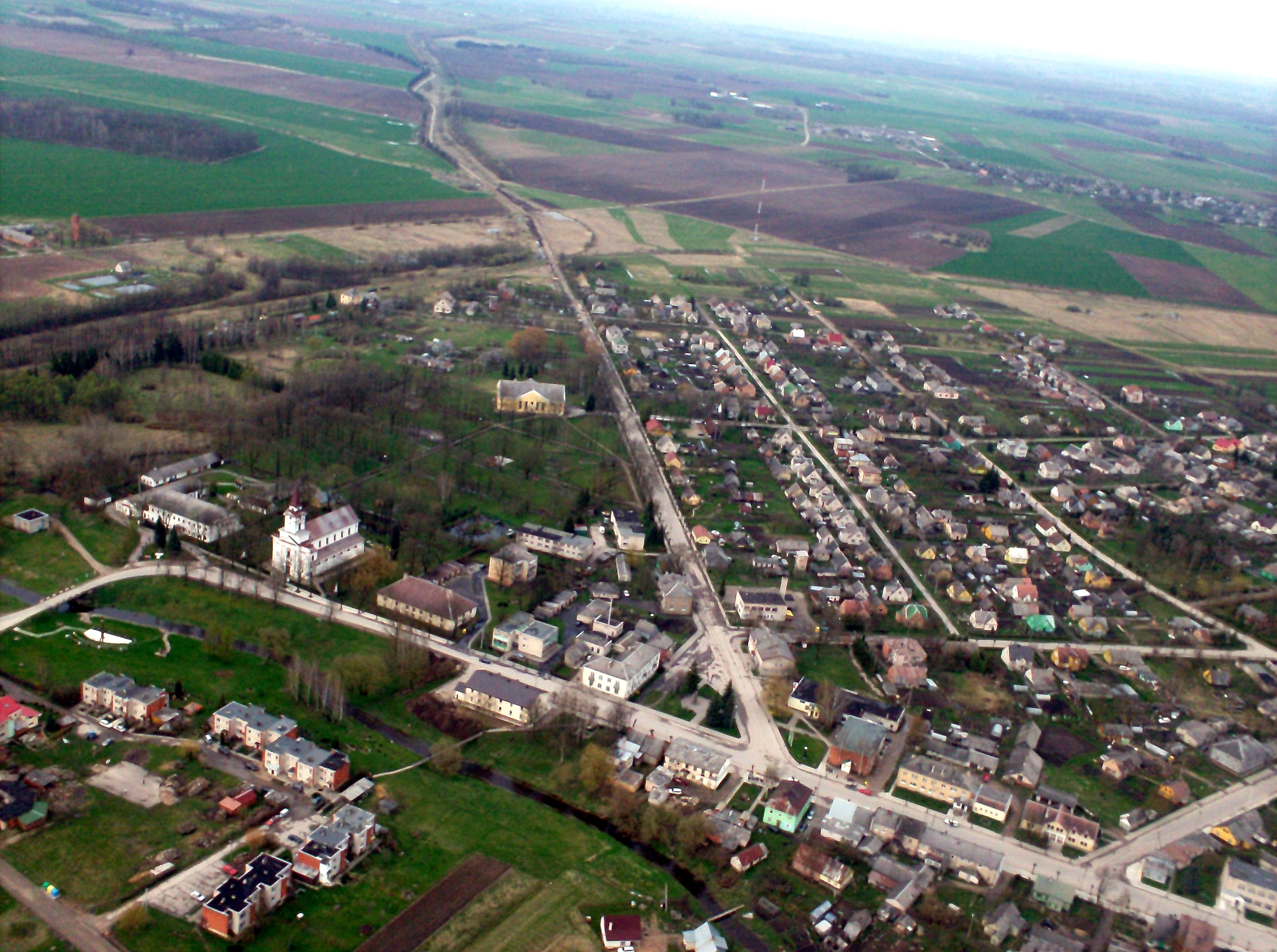

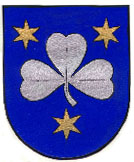
- Coat of arms

- Location of Joniškėlis
- Coordinates: 56°1′30″N 24°10′10″E
- Country: Lithuania
- Ethnographic region: Aukštaitija
- County: Panevėžys County
- Municipality: Pasvalys district municipality
- Eldership: Joniškėlis eldership
- Capital of: Joniškėlis eldership
- First mentioned: 1685
- Granted city rights: 1736

Population (2022)
  - Total: 972
- Time zone: UTC+2 (EET)
  - Summer (DST): UTC+3 (EEST)

Joniškėlis is a city in the Pasvalys district municipality, Lithuania. It is located 15 km (9.3 mi) west of Pasvalys. In the north of the road 150 (Siauliai-Pakruojis-Pasvalys).

== Name ==
Versions of the city's name in other languages include Polish: Johaniszkiele, Russian: Иоганишкели Ioganishkeli, Yiddish: יאַנישקעל Yonishkel.

== History ==
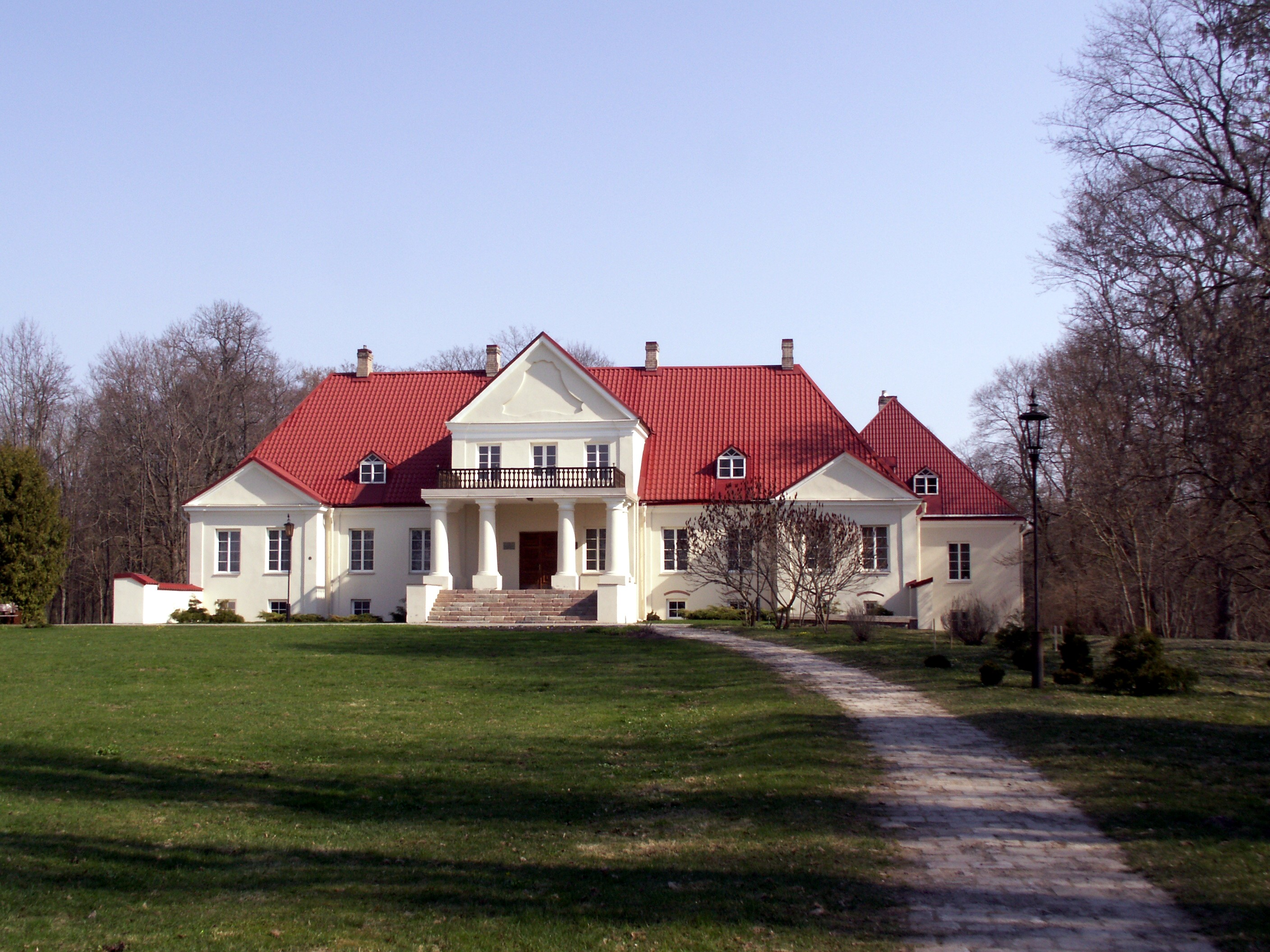
Manor of Joniškėlis

The Joniškėlis estate, which belonged to Karpis family in known from the 17th century. In 1684 first wooden church was built. The town started to establish itself in the second half of 17th century. In 1736 King of Poland and Grand Duke of Lithuania Augustus III granted rights to organize market in the town. Owner of the Joniškėlis estate, Ignotas Karpis (1780–1808 m.) in his testament noted that part of the income from the estate should be spent for local hospital and school and peasants of his estate were freed from serfdom.

Before World War II, around 20% of the total population was Jewish. During the summer 1941, 200 Joniskelis Jews were shot to death by Germans in the Žadeikiai Forest in Pasvalys.
