= Murder of Vicente Bermúdez Zacarías =

Mexican federal judge murdered on 17 October 2016

- Part of Mexican drug war
- Surveillance video screenshot showing the moment when he was shot
- Location: 19°15′41.9″N 99°34′29″W; Metepec, State of Mexico, Mexico
- Date: 17 October 2016; 7:30 – 8:30 a.m. (Central Time)
- Target: Vicente Antonio Bermúdez Zacarías
- Attack type: Shooting
- Weapon: 9 mm pistol
- Deaths: 1 (intended target)
- Motive: Unknown

On 17 October 2016, Mexican federal judge Vicente Bermúdez Zacarías went on a morning jog near his home in Metepec, State of Mexico, an upscale community outside of Mexico City. As he was crossing a street, an unidentified gunman came up behind him and shot him at point-blank range in the head. Bermúdez Zacarías fell to the ground bleeding and was transported to a nearby hospital, but died before he was able to receive medical attention. The perpetrator fled the scene with an accomplice after reportedly hiding in an abandoned lot nearby. The incident was captured through a surveillance camera and was leaked to the media the following day. The identity of the suspected gunman was discovered the following year, but both men remain at large.

His murder garnered national attention and reactions from the highest levels of the Mexican government, including from President Enrique Peña Nieto and the Supreme Court of Justice of the Nation. Attacks against federal judges like Bermúdez Zacarías were a rare occurrence in the ongoing Mexican drug war since organized crime groups rarely targeted high-ranking judicial officials. The President ordered the investigation to be under federal jurisdiction. Investigators discovered that two weeks before he was killed, Bermúdez Zacarías suspected that two men were following him. He called the police one day on his way home, but did not request to have security measures in place for his daily activities.

Bermúdez Zacarías was based in the State of Mexico and served various court positions throughout his career. He led several notable civil and organized crime cases, including those involving suspected high-ranking leaders from Mexico's drug trafficking organizations. Initial suspicion for his murder fell on Joaquín "El Chapo" Guzmán, once considered Mexico's most-wanted drug lord. Bermúdez Zacarías had presided over a part of his extradition process. However, the main line of investigation suggests that Bermúdez Zacarías was killed after investigating irregularities committed by his court predecessor and his accomplices. Six months before the murder, Bermúdez Zacarías accused them of visiting inmates at the Federal Social Readaptation Center No. 1 without legal authorization.

== Background ==
=== Early life ===
Vicente Antonio Bermúdez Zacarías was born on 1978 or 1979 in León, Guanajuato, Mexico. (Note: This approximate date of birth was calculated based on his age (37) and year of death, 2016.) His father, Vicente Bermúdez Vargas, was a lawyer, and his mother, María Elena Zacarías, was a grade school teacher. He had two siblings; a younger and an older sister. He grew up in the community of Santa Rosa Plan de Ayala, a rural community in León. Since he was six years old, Bermúdez Zacarías told his parents that he wanted to become a lawyer. While in primary school, Bermúdez Zacarías was studious and had a high grade point average. He then left to Silao, Guanajuato, for high school and attended Preparatoria Oficial. Upon graduation, he attended the University of Guanajuato from 1996 to 2001 and received his bachelor's degree in law. He then did his master's degree in criminal law at the Universidad Iberoamericana León. He interned at the High Court of Justice in Guanajuato prior to joining full-time. Outside of school, he enjoyed playing basketball and association football.

He began his legal career at the Sixth Civil Chamber of the Supreme Court of Guanajuato as an administrative assistant. He then held the post of judicial official and actuary at the First District Court of the Federal Criminal Proceedings in the State of Mexico. Bermúdez Zacarías was the secretary of the First Tribunal Court of the Twelve Circuit, representing Sinaloa; of the Tribunal Court of Administrative Matters and Work in the Sixteenth District, representing Guanajuato; and in the First Tribunal Unit of the Sixteenth. In December 2013, he became the district court judge of the Sixth Penal Court, responsible for authorizing home raids, preventative arrests, and detainee communication in Mexico City. In March 2016, he served as an appeals court judge responsible for authorizing writs of amparo and presiding over civil proceedings at a federal level in the State of Mexico.

=== Major cases ===
Bermúdez Zacarías presided over several major criminal law cases, including those involving high-ranking organized crime members. In September 2013, he presided over the case involving suspected Los Zetas leader Miguel Treviño Morales (alias "Z-40"). Bermúdez Zacarías ordered his arrest warrant and formally charged him after he was arrested in July 2013. In July 2016, he presided over another case involving Treviño Morales, this time because he alleged to not have received remuneration for his prison job and for not being allowed to go to the prison's yard. Bermúdez Zacarías decided in favor of Treviño Morales. In March 2015, he ordered the 40-day preventative arrest of Abigael González Valencia (alias "El Cuini"), a suspected drug lord and high-ranking leader of the Jalisco New Generation Cartel. González Valencia was arrested by Mexican security forces the month before, and was wanted for international drug trafficking and arms trafficking. Following the preventative arrest imposed by Zacarías, he was transferred to a maximum-security prison. In June 2015, he approved a writ of amparo for Ildefonso Zamora, a Mexican environmentalist who was arrested months earlier for an alleged robbery attempt. According to Bermúdez Zacarías' decision, the environmentalist's rights were violated because his presumption of innocence was ignored since there was no evidence against him. This decision guaranteed his release from prison unless the state government vetoed it. Zamora Baldomero was released from prison in August 2015.

Bermúdez Zacarías played a role in the legal process of Joaquín "El Chapo" Guzmán, once considered Mexico's most-wanted drug lord, when El Chapo was at large and in prison in Mexico. After El Chapo escaped from prison a second time in July 2015, Bermúdez Zacarías issued several rulings against him and his inner circle. He authorized law enforcement to intercept his conversations with his wife Emma Coronel Aispuro. This approval was done a week before El Chapo was re-arrested in January 2016. In March 2016, Bermúdez Zacarías suspended the extradition request of El Chapo to the United States. (Note: One source stated that this information was false. It stated that El Chapo's defense issued a writ of amparo in February 2016 claiming that their client was receiving unfair treatment in jail and was not allowed to communicate with his attorneys or family. Bermúdez Zacarías' role, according to this source, was to agree that the claims were true. However, Bermúdez Zacarías stated that there was no evidence for El Chapo's claims.) El Chapo's defense requested to have their client extradited because El Chapo reportedly believed that the prison conditions in Mexico were too harsh. El Chapo was later moved from the Federal Social Readaptation Center No. 1 (also known as "Altiplano") maximum-security prison in the State of Mexico to the Federal Social Readaptation Center No. 9 (also known as "Norte") in Ciudad Juárez, Chihuahua, in May 2016. In January 2017, after nearly a year of court appeals and legal proceedings, he was extradited to the U.S.

In September 2016, Bermúdez Zacarías presided over the tax fraud investigation of Naim Libien Kaui, the owner of Mexico City's newspaper Unomásuno. Unomásuno and the owner's son, Naim Libien Tella, were linked to González Valencia's drug trafficking group the previous year. According to court documents, Libien Kaui committed an income tax fraud of MXN$11,413,886 in 2012, as well as other income tax frauds in 2010, 2011, and 2013. The day Libien Kaui was arrested, he issued a writ of amparo to the State of Mexico appeals court over which Bermúdez Zacarías presided. Bermúdez Zacarías, however, struck down the writ of amparo under the rationale that the case was out of his jurisdiction. He then pushed the case to another court in Mexico City. In October 2016, he dismissed a writ of amparo issued by Gildardo López Astudillo (alias "El Gil"), a major suspect in the mass disappearance of 43 students in Guerrero that occurred in 2014. The writ of amparo was issued because El Gil wanted to be transferred from Altiplano prison. However, he rejected the request because complaints for approvals were nonexistent. Bermúdez Zacarías also presided over the cases against Javier Torres Félix, convicted high-ranking leader of the Sinaloa Cartel, and Mario Cárdenas Guillén, a suspected Gulf Cartel leader. (Note: The cited source does not specify the dates when Bermúdez Zacarías presided over these two cases.)

== Murder ==
On 17 October 2016, Bermúdez Zacarías went on a morning jog near his home in Metepec, (Note: The exact time when Bermúdez Zacarías was shot varies between sources. Accounts agree that it happened between 7:30 and 8:30 am.) an upscale exurb 45 miles (72 km) outside of Mexico City. As he was crossing a side street in front of a private residential neighborhood entrance, (Note: The exact location was on Árbol de la Vida street, close to the corner with Ignacio Allende street. Árbol de la Vida street continues towards 5 de Febrero and Adolfo López Mateos intersections. These streets are in Agrícola Bellavista neighborhood. The private residential neighborhood where he was close by is La Asunción. This incident was close to his home in Llano Grande neighborhood.) a man dressed in black ran up to him from behind and shot him at point-blank range in the head with a 9 mm pistol. Bermúdez Zacarías was able to turn his head briefly before the gunman delivered the shot to the back of his head. The judge fell to the ground bleeding and curled into a fetal position before rolling onto his back and spreading his legs and arms. The assassin then ran back and startled a cyclist and a pedestrian before catching up with his accomplice, who was waiting for him from a distance, before fleeing the scene. (Note: Preliminary sources stated that the two men fled the scene in a car. According to an eye-witness, the two hid in an abandoned lot near the murder scene before taking off.) While Bermúdez Zacarías was on the ground, a car stopped next to him for a few seconds before continuing its course. A second vehicle turned towards the street Bermúdez Zacarías was on, but continued driving inside the residential neighborhood after stopping momentarily. The security guards from the residential neighborhood then called an ambulance. He was transported to Regional Hospital 251 of the Mexican Social Security Institute in Metepec, but doctors confirmed that he died before reaching the hospital. (Note: Before the hospital confirmed that Bermúdez Zacarías died before receiving medical attention, preliminary reports stated that he arrived at the hospital alive and subsequently died from his gunshot wounds. Other preliminary sources stated he died on his way to the hospital. He was transported to a hospital in Metepec, but preliminary sources stated he was taken to a hospital in Toluca, State of Mexico.) The murder scene was cordoned by the Metepec municipal police, the State of Mexico police, and members of the State of Mexico Attorney General Office. All three law enforcement agencies conducted an investigation at the street where Bermúdez Zacarías was gunned down.

Bermúdez Zacarías' corpse was sent from the State of Mexico to León, Guanajuato on 18 October and arrived after 7:30 p.m. local time. His body was first taken in a hearse to his parents' house (escorted by vehicles from the Mexican Federal Police), where his family, friends, and acquaintances hosted a wake service. From early in the morning, Bermúdez Zacarías' family and friends began to prepare for the ceremony by putting up several chairs and flower arrangements. A mass ceremony was conducted that night, and prayers were held until dawn. Approximately 500 people attended the ceremonies. Several of Bermúdez Zacarías's hometown friends, including local authorities, posted eulogies on social media and expressed their condolences to the family. Bermúdez Zacarías' father stated that his family was deeply saddened by the murder. He also said that the murder was work-related and a revenge attack from an organized crime group. Following the priest's sermon, he asked Supreme Court of Justice of the Nation (SCJN) head Luis María Aguilar Morales to fully investigate the systematic corruption in Mexico's justice system. The next morning, Bermúdez Zacarías' body was buried at Jardines del Tiempo cemetery in León.

His murder garnered national attention and reactions from the highest levels of the Mexican government, (Note: Though the murder garnered national attention initially, the incident was covered in the media with less frequency a week after the incident.) including President Enrique Peña Nieto (2012–2018). In a meeting with the International Union of Magistrates (es), Peña Nieto condemned the murder and instructed Mexico's Attorney General Office (PGR) under Arely Gómez González to take over the case. He did not provide further details on the case. There was also no immediate word from authorities on a possible motive. Reactions then extended to other levels of the government; Aguilar Morales also condemned the murder and asked the government to fully investigate the case. He stated that the government needed to protect the integrity of its judges and magistrates. The head of the Senate of the Republic, Pablo Escudero Morales, also condemned the murder and stated that they fully respected what federal judges like Bermúdez Zacarías do for the country. His death also garnered reactions from human rights groups in Mexico and abroad. Mexico's National Human Rights Commission (CNDH) demanded the Mexican government to provide better protection to its judges, and stated that the murder's intention was to intimidate other judges. Amnesty International issued a message condemning the attacks, and asked the Mexican government to carry out a swift, extensive, and independent investigation. The Inter-American Commission on Human Rights asked the Mexican government to consider the cases Bermúdez Zacarías' presided over as possible motives for his murder.

== Investigation ==
On 17 October 2016, the same day he was murdered, PGR offices in the State of Mexico took over the entire case. The PGR explained that this case fell under their jurisdiction because of Article 20 and other clauses of the National Code of Criminal Proceedings and Legal Protection, which grants them jurisdiction over cases which they see fit and that fall under certain legal criteria. Gilberto Higuera and Noé Rodríguez, heads of the State of Mexico's appeal system, met with State of Mexico Attorney General Alejandro Jaime Gómez Sánchez to discuss the PGR's decision. The Governor of the State of Mexico, Eruviel Ávila Villegas, confirmed to the press later that day that investigators had a video recording of the murder. He did not go into detail about the lines of investigation they were considering, but stated that the PGR and State of Mexico officials were working together. He also offered his condolences to Bermúdez Zacarías' last employers, the SCJN, and told them that the assassin in the video would be arrested. Mexico's Executive Commission for Attention to Victims (CEVA) offered to help the family legal advice and counseling.

The murder of a federal judge and high-ranking judicial official like Bermúdez Zacarías was a rare occurrence in the ongoing Mexican drug war (2006–present). The federal judge murdered before Bermúdez Zacarías was René Hilario Nieto Contreras, who was killed in October 2006 in Toluca, reportedly on orders from the Gulf Cartel. In 2010, federal judge Carlos Alberto Elorza Amores was attacked by suspected organized crime members in Nayarit. He survived the attack with minor injuries, but one of his bodyguards was killed in the shootout. In 2015, federal judge Joel Fernando Tinajero Jiménez was shot and injured in Jalisco. It is more common for police chiefs, journalists, priests, mayors, and local judges to suffer attacks from organized crime. The rarity of attacks against federal judges is due to the fact that many of them enjoy better protection from Mexico's judicial branches. According to data from the Council of the Federal Judiciary (CJF) (es), 21 judges and magistrates had bodyguards in 2012. They also have several established security protocols. If a judge faces a threat, the CJF helps the judge and his/her family by transferring them to other cities.

The CNDH suggested after Bermúdez Zacarías' murder to create a policy to have judges handle cases anonymously in order to protect their identity. They argued that by having this policy in place, judges would be able to preside over cases impartially and without being intimidated. This method was used in Peru, Colombia, and Italy to protect judges who faced threats from armed groups. The Mexican government stated that they would debate and consider the proposal as an option, but said that accepting the policy would mean that they were giving in to the pressures from organized crime. Moreover, the 2016 judicial reform – the New Criminal Justice System (Spanish: Nuevo Sistema de Justicia Penal, NSJP) – advocated for greater judicial transparency, a move that was seen at odds with the proposed policy. When Bermúdez Zacarías was murdered, only 70 out of 1,391 federal judges had security measures in place to protect them from attacks. Several judges advocated for more security measures, but this also posed several challenges because of the limited resources and long processes that would need to take place for such budgets to be approved by politicians. Local judges, however, do not enjoy the level of protection that their federal counterparts have, and attacks from organized crime members are more prevalent. In addition, most of the cases involving attacks or intimidation against judges are not reported to the police. If the cases are filed to the police, many of them do not reach a court of law and are closed without imparting justice.

=== Possible motives and leads ===
Six months before his murder, Bermúdez Zacarías issued a complaint to the CJF for several irregularities he found in his job when he joined as an appeals judge in 2016. According to Bermúdez Zacarías' findings, Mayumi Guadalupe Sánchez Torres, the wife of his predecessor Jorge Arturo Porras Gutiérrez, (Note: Jorge Arturo Porras Gutiérrez was the appeals court judge from October 2013 to March 2016, when Bermúdez Zacarías replaced him.) was visiting several inmates at Altiplano prison without justification. Her job was to legally notify inmates of their cases in person, but Bermúdez Zacarías also discovered that she was abusing this right and visiting other inmates who were not in their itinerary. Sánchez Torres was an actuary at the appeals court and was accompanied by another actuary, Ana Lilia Coyote Colín, during her prison visits. They were taken to prison by Alejandro Coyote Colín, who served as the driver. Bermúdez Zacarías discovered that the driver also spoke with the inmates and posed as an actuary. This complaint led the CJF to investigate and suspend Sánchez Torres, Ana Lilia, and two other people. Investigators are considering this line of investigation as a possible motive for his murder.

As part of the investigation, the CJF analyzed the possibility of suspending Porras Gutiérrez from his post as district judge in Poza Rica, Veracruz, a position he held when Bermúdez Zacarías was killed. On 19 October, Porras Gutiérrez and his wife Sánchez Torres spoke to the press and stated that they were not involved in Bermúdez Zacarías' murder. They said the accusations were absurd and negatively impacted their reputation and integrity. Porras Gutiérrez clarified that he never tried to cover up any alleged wrongdoings, and Sánchez Torres stated that as an actuary, she was responsible for visiting prison inmates to make notifications, and clarified that the accusations of her visiting inmates without justification were false. Porras Gutiérrez admitted that he received death threats during his tenure as an appeals judge before Bermúdez Zacarías joined. (Note: Specifically, Porras Gutiérrez stated that he received death threats from La Familia Michoacana, a criminal group based in Michoacán. Another source, citing an investigator who allegedly spoke with him, said that Porras Gutiérrez admitted that he did not receive death threats.) He told the press that he had up to eight policemen guarding him and travelled in armored vehicles for at least two years. When asked about the investigation against him, Porras Gutiérrez said the police had not reached out to him for questioning. The following day, he also said he would help investigators by providing them with any information they might request from him to help facilitate the case.

Two weeks before he was killed, Bermúdez Zacarías reached out to the Metepec municipal police for help and told them that he suspected that someone was following him. He also told this to Manuel Delgadillo Aguiñaga, one of his coworkers. After the murder, his coworker told investigators that Bermúdez Zacarías saw two suspicious men on a motorcycle one day in his neighborhood when he was coming back home from work. Bermúdez Zacarías decided to turn around in his car and drive away. Minutes later, he arrived home escorted by a Metepec police car. Despite fearing for his life, Bermúdez Zacarías did not officially ask for any sort of security measures or protection, and continued his daily activities as usual. According to his family, Bermúdez Zacarías never told them about this incident or that he faced any work-related death threats.

His murder is currently unsolved, but initial suspicions led investigators to the high-profile organized crime cases he handled. According to a former Drug Enforcement Administration (DEA) chief agent, two insider sources within Mexico's security agencies believe that El Chapo was behind Bermúdez Zacarías' murder. This line of investigation considers that El Chapo was dissatisfied with the way Bermúdez Zacarías managed the extradition process against him. They believe that after Bermúdez Zacarías suspended El Chapo's extradition to the U.S. in May 2016, El Chapo considered that Bermúdez Zacarías was putting him in danger by keeping him in a Mexican prison. Investigators alleged that El Chapo was pushing for his extradition because he feared for his life in Mexico because the government could not afford to have him escape from prison a third time. The former DEA chief agent stated that his sources told him that Bermúdez Zacarías received death threats a few days before he was killed. It remains unclear to investigators if there is any connection between the murder and the high-profile cases over which he presided.

Because Bermúdez Zacarías was responsible for striking a writ of amparo that prevented El Chapo's extradition, rumors began to surface that El Chapo may have been behind his murder. El Chapo's lawyers, however, told the press that their client had nothing to do with the incident. José Refugio Rodríguez, one of the attorneys in El Chapo's legal team, said that Bermúdez Zacarías' decision to halt his client's extradition did not benefit or negatively affect their case. He mentioned that the writ of amparo was simply issued to help El Chapo buy more time, and that Bermúdez Zacarías' decision was previously decided by another court in Mexico City. Rodríguez stated that he lamented Bermúdez Zacarías' death and complained that he did not have security measures in place to safeguard his life. In addition, his lawyers blamed the press of abusing their client and creating yellow journalism by linking the murder to El Chapo. In an interview with the press, Carlos Castillo Castillo, another of El Chapo's attorneys, stated when they began the writ of amparo procedures for El Chapo, Bermúdez Zacarías was not working at the appeals court. (Note: Other sources stated that Bermúdez Zacarías was handling El Chapo's extradition case prior to his murder.) He did admit that the judge analyzed the case, but reiterated that the decision to halt El Chapo's extradition was not entirely up to him.

=== Leaked video and eyewitness ===
The video investigators had in their possession was from a surveillance camera of the neighborhood. It leaked to the press on 18 October. The release of the video posed a number of challenges for investigators, however. By leaking the video, they explained, a judge could invalidate it as evidence in the case. According to Mexican law, before evidence is presented before a judge, it has to be legally gathered and safeguarded. If the evidence is released to the public before presented to a judge, the judge might render the evidence invalid if the judge considers that it violated the due process and eliminates the possibility of the suspect having presumption of innocence. The CJF complained that the leak infringed with the legal proceedings because it compromised the efficacy of the investigation and violated the rights of the victim's family. They stated that the release of the video showed that there were insiders with "other interests" in the case whose intentions were to purposely release the video to hurt the investigation. On 20 October, the CJF issued a lawsuit and presented it to the PGR and State of Mexico officials, arguing that it was illegal for government officials to leak the video. They asked both agencies to conduct an investigation to uncover who was responsible for releasing it to the public. The PGR stated that their personnel did not leak the video, and that it was likely the people in charge of the security cameras in Metepec.

The day of the murder, an eyewitness came forward and told investigators that she allegedly saw the two young men involved in Bermúdez Zacarías' murder. She said that the two men were of slim complexion and may have been 24–25 years old; according to her description, one was fully dressed in black and that the other had dark pants and a white sweater. The woman saw them as she was driving through the street where Bermúdez Zacarías was murdered. When she first saw the two men, she did not think they were suspicious because she thought they were construction workers from a nearby site. (Note: According to another source, the eyewitness thought that the two men were bodyguards.) As she was driving down the street, she saw Bermúdez Zacarías on the road and thought that he had fainted. When she got close to the body, she noticed a pool of blood. She turned back to look at the two men, who kept walking down the street in an opposite direction.

According to the woman, another car pulled over and tried to help Bermúdez Zacarías by telling a nearby security officer to call the police. The eyewitness then made a U-turn and followed the alleged assassins in her car. Tho two men went into hiding in an abandoned lot a few blocks away. She noticed that the lot was gated, and returned to the crime scene to see if any police officers had arrived. When the first policemen arrived, she reportedly told them that she saw two men walk into an abandoned lot. A third policeman went to inspect the lot, but came back to the murder scene after not seeing anything suspicious. The eyewitness complained to the press that the policemen were slow to act and may not have checked the abandoned lot thoroughly since she said there were several large bushes where the two men may have been hiding. A few days after her confession, the eyewitness stated that she was harassed by people who were presumably armed outside her home and in a vehicle.

=== Suspects identified ===
On 6 January 2017, the CJF informed that it had suspended Porras Gutiérrez for six months as district judge of Poza Rica for lying about the illegal visits the driver did at Altiplano. (Note: The order to suspend him was first made on 16 November 2016.) According to investigators, the driver was permanently living in Toluca – close to Altiplano – even though he was assigned in Veracruz. The CJF suspected that Porras Gutiérrez gave him permission to live outside of his assigned city. During the suspension time, Porras Gutiérrez was allowed to receive only 30% of his salary. His wife Sánchez Torres was permanently suspended before him. Later that year in May, the CJF started a legal proceeding against Alejandro, the driver, after the CJF concluded that Porras Gutiérrez was trying to cover up his involvement.

On 24 August 2017, the PGR identified the suspected murderer after analyzing a video recording from a convenience store during the time of the murder. The recording took place after Bermúdez Zacarías was killed. In the video, a taxi from Metepec stopped at an OXXO convenience store, where the suspect got off to buy certain items. About a minute later, the suspect exited the store after purchasing several goods. He then walks towards the taxi, thanks the driver, and opens the back door. The other suspect, believed to have been at the crime scene, got off the vehicle. The face of the first suspect was captured by the surveillance cameras, but it was not possible to recognize the face of the other one. Both of them then left the store on foot and were no longer visible by the surveillance camera.

On 17 October 2017, exactly one year after Bermúdez Zacarías was killed, the case had not yet been reviewed by a judge in a court of law. The CJF also stated that it had not received a formal request to increase security measures for judges across the country. On 25 October, the CJF handed out a 20-year suspension to Porras Gutiérrez, Sánchez Torres, and Ana Lilia, after identifying irregularities in their job activities. The CJF stated that they acted in accordance to the law and had sufficient evidences against them to carry out this suspension, which prohibited from holding any type of government job during the established timeframe. The case against these three functionaries was handed over to the PGR, who will carry out a civil investigation against them. However, the CJF clarified that this suspension was not definite because the three functionaries could legally challenge the decision in court.

On 9 November 2017, the CJF suspended 10 actuaries from the court of Bermúdez Zacarías indefinitely after suspecting that they were also involved in the illegal visits in Altiplano. Their names were not made public in order to avoid disrupting the legal procedures and preserving presumption of innocence. According to evidence presented by the CJF, these 10 actuaries sought to or conducted 236 illegal visits at Altiplano with the complicity of prison guards. The CJF suspects that they acted as messengers for imprisoned drug lords, and smuggled drugs and other items on their behalf.

On 3 June 2018, the PGR publicized a MXN$1.5 million reward to anyone who provides information that leads to the arrest of the perpetrator(s). They stated that the reward would not be handed over to those who work in law enforcement and law.

=== Arrests ===
On 14 October 2019, Bermúdez Zacarías' ex-wife Marisol Macías Gutiérrez was arrested for her alleged participation in the murder. According to authorities, she masterminded the attack to receive money from his life insurance plan.

== See also ==
- List of politicians killed in the Mexican drug war
