= Sistema Integrado de Transporte Optibús =

Bus rapid transit in León, Guanajuato, Mexico

Optibús
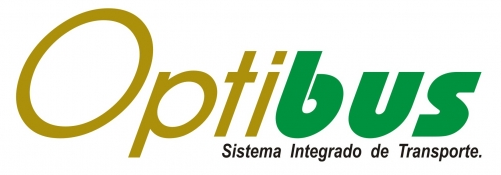

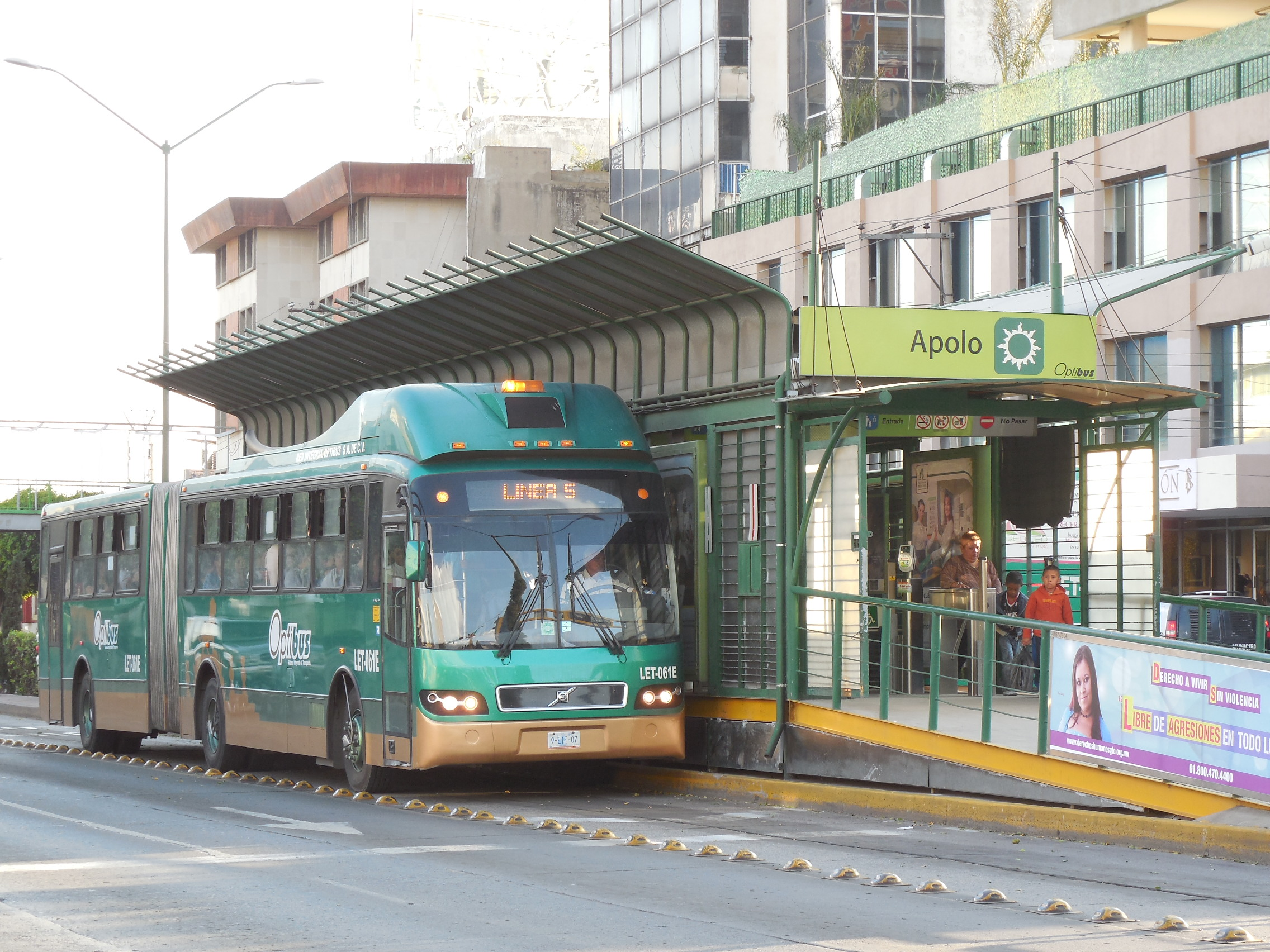
- An Optibús at Apolo station

Overview
- Locale: León, Guanajuato
- Transit type: Bus rapid transit
- Number of lines: 10
- Number of stations: 65
- Daily ridership: 120,000

Operation
- Began operation: September 28, 2003
- Operator: Transportistas Coordinados de León

Technical
- System length: 40.45 mi (65.10 km)
System map
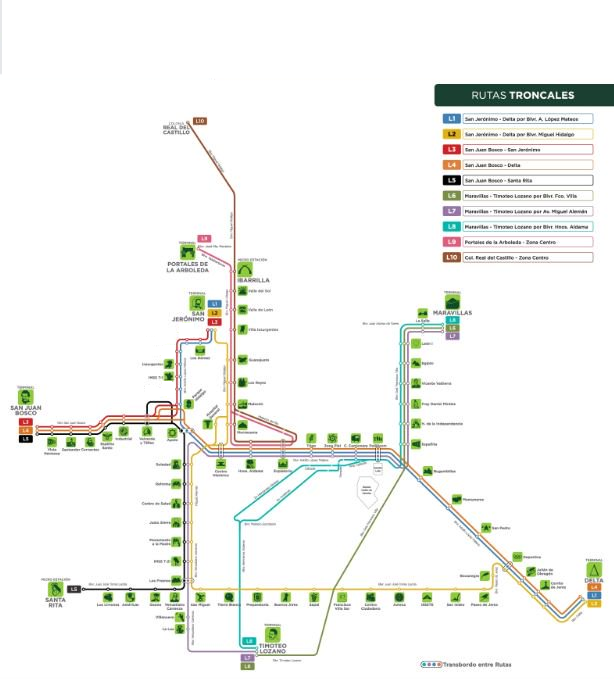

SIT Optibús (officially Sistema Integrado de Transporte Optibús) is a bus rapid transit (BRT) system operating in León, Guanajuato, Mexico. Locally it is known also as "La Oruga" (the caterpillar), due to its use of articulated buses.

== History ==
Most of the Optibús route uses city streets, but with dedicated bus lanes and high-level platform stations. The system was inaugurated on September 27, 2003 and cost a total of 1,405,700,000 pesos to implement. León was the first city in Mexico to implement a BRT system. The system is part of the integrated transit network for León and utilizes prepaid farecards (known as Pagobús), which can be used for every other bus route as well.

In 2016, 58 Torino OH 1624/59 buses by Mercedes-Benz were acquired for the system.

In 2019 and 2020, an app to improve the service was being planned, along with a purchase of 1,000 new buses, gates, and installing Wi-Fi and security cameras in each bus.

== Statistics ==
The Optibus accounts for 85% of trips taken on public transportation in León. Daily ridership is around 120,000. There were 17,200,123 riders in August 2024. According to a 2024 study by the Mario Molina Center, León's public transportation system in ranked ninth place out of 32 systems in Mexico.
