= Plaza Mayor (shopping center) =

Shopping mall in León, Guanajuato, Mexico

Coordinates: 21.1577°N 101.6951°W

Plaza Mayor is the largest mall in León, Guanajuato, the core city of Mexico's seventh-largest metropolitan area. It has 117,000 m^{2} (1,260,000 sq ft) gross leasable area, of which 70,000 m^{2} (750,000 sq ft) is retail floor space, and has parking for 2,500 cars. Anchored by Sears and Liverpool, it will soon add a branch of the most upscale department store in Mexico, El Palacio de Hierro.

Plaza Mayor is anchored by:

- Sears full-line department store
- Liverpool, a full-line department store, which has plans to expand to 27,000 m^{2} (290,000 sq ft)
- West Elm, U.S.-based furniture superstore
- Innovasport, a 100+-store Monterrey-based chain of activewear and sporting goods superstores
- Sanborns junior department store and restaurant
- Cinemex multicinema
- Palacio de Hierro full-line department store

== Palacio de Hierro León ==
Plaza Mayor will soon add a ca. 30,000 m^{2} (320,000 sq ft) Palacio de Hierro under construction, to open in 2024. León is one of only eight metropolitan areas in Mexico to boast a full-line Palacio store, after twenty years of the mall seeking Palacio to build a store there. The opening reflects how El Palacio views the maturing of the local market and growth in the higher-income segment, both in León and nearby in El Bajío in cities like San Miguel de Allende, Celaya, Irapuato and the City of Guanajuato.
