= León, Guanajuato =

León León de los Aldama
- City
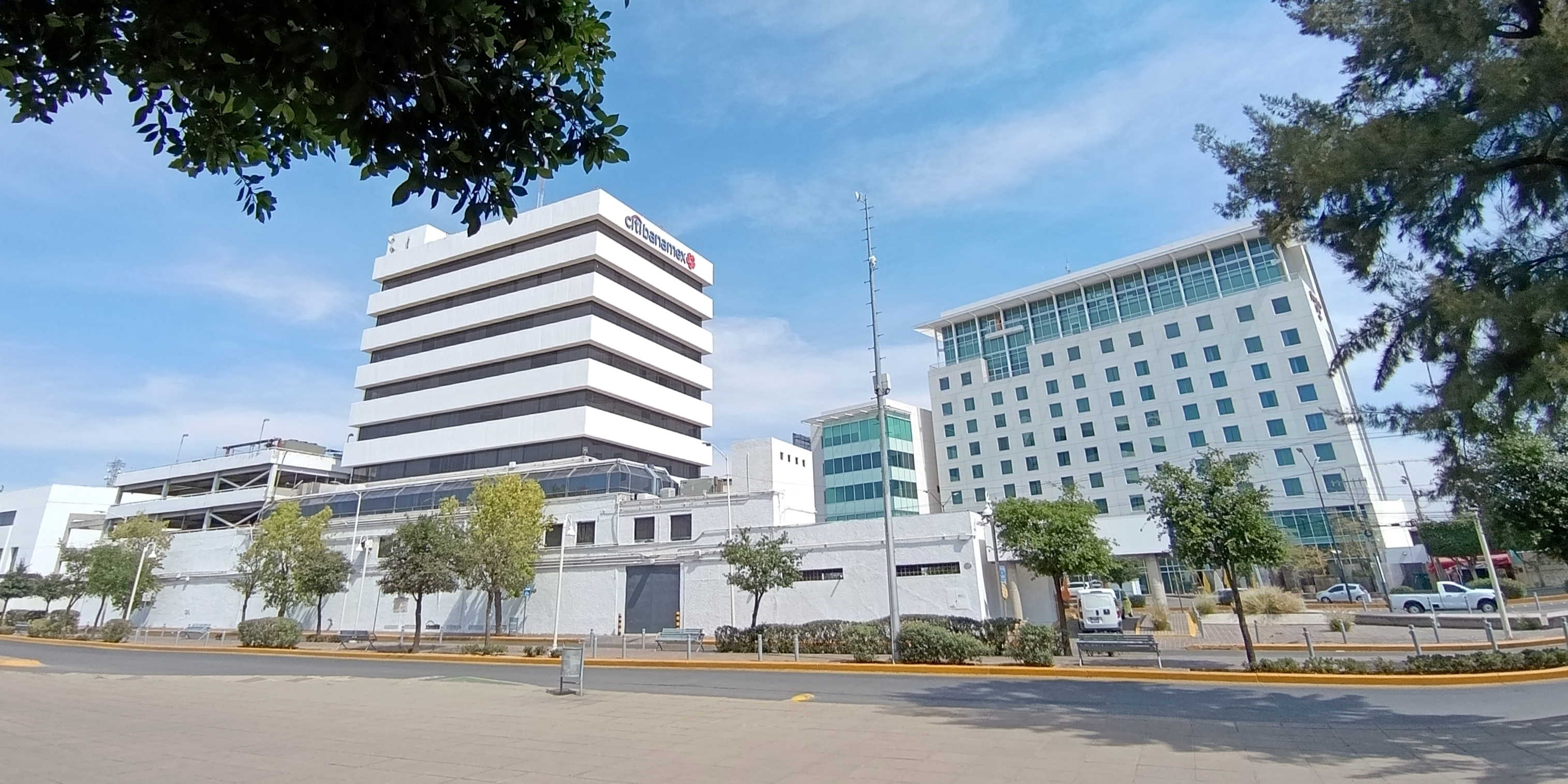
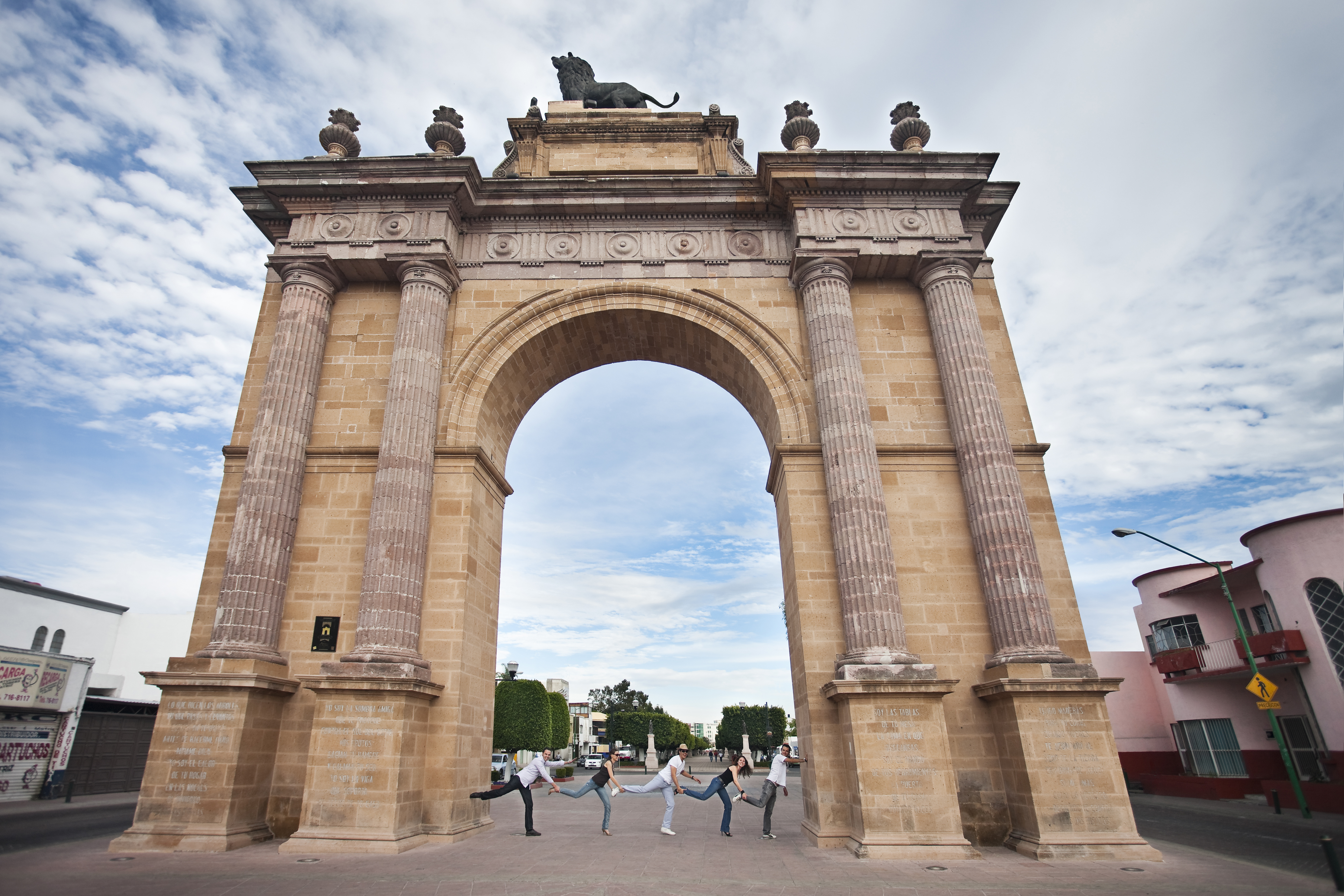
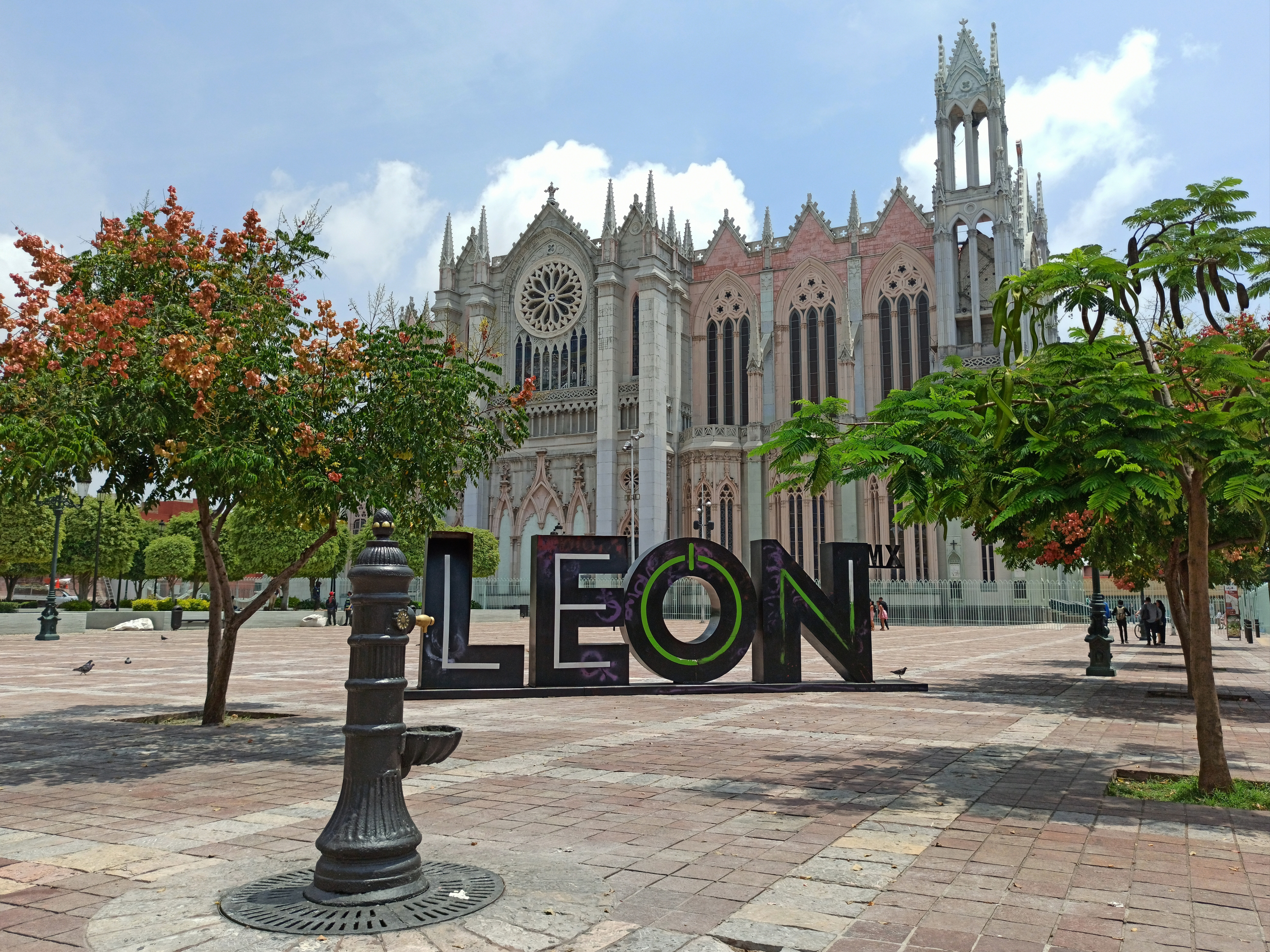
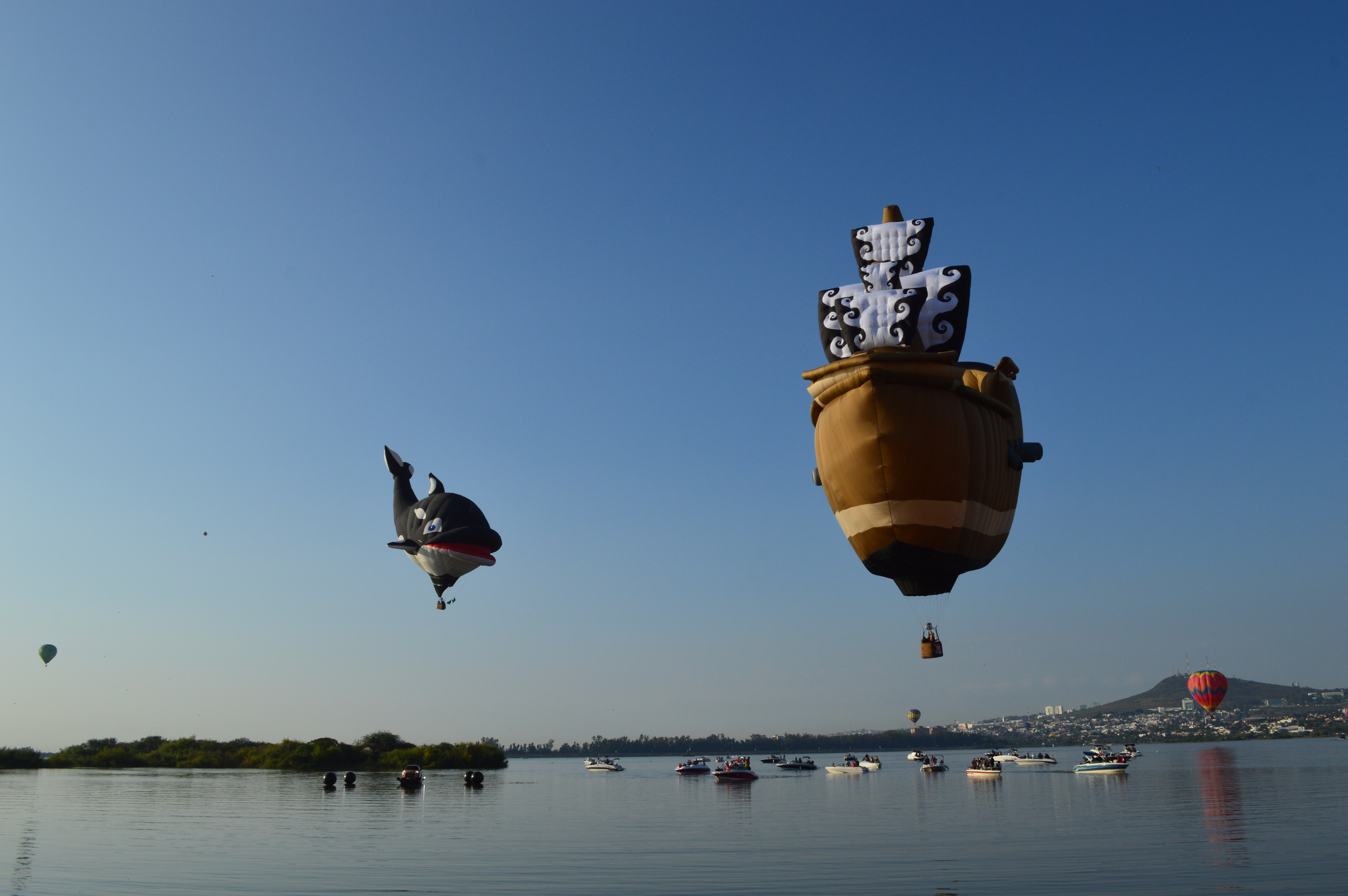
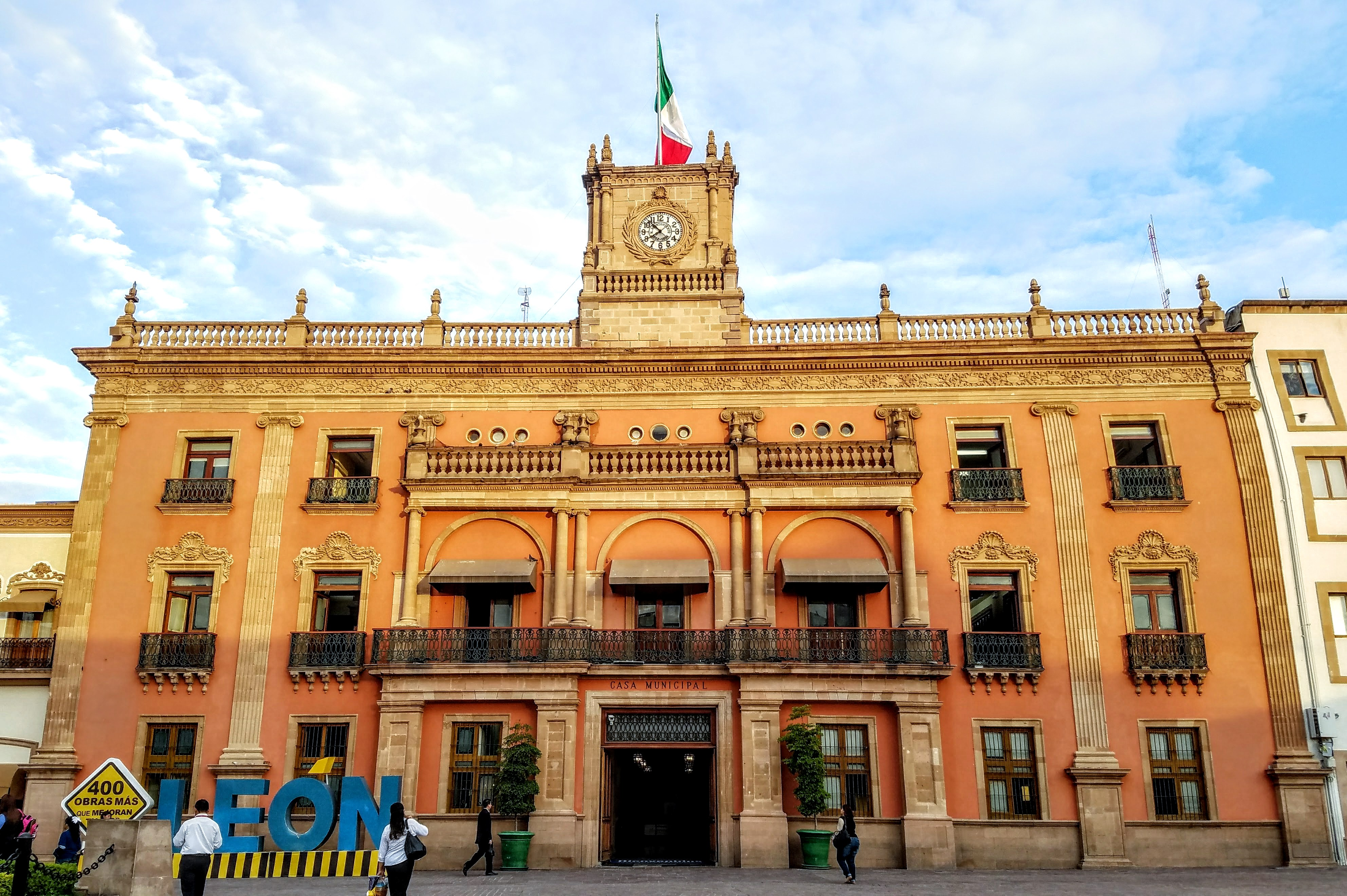
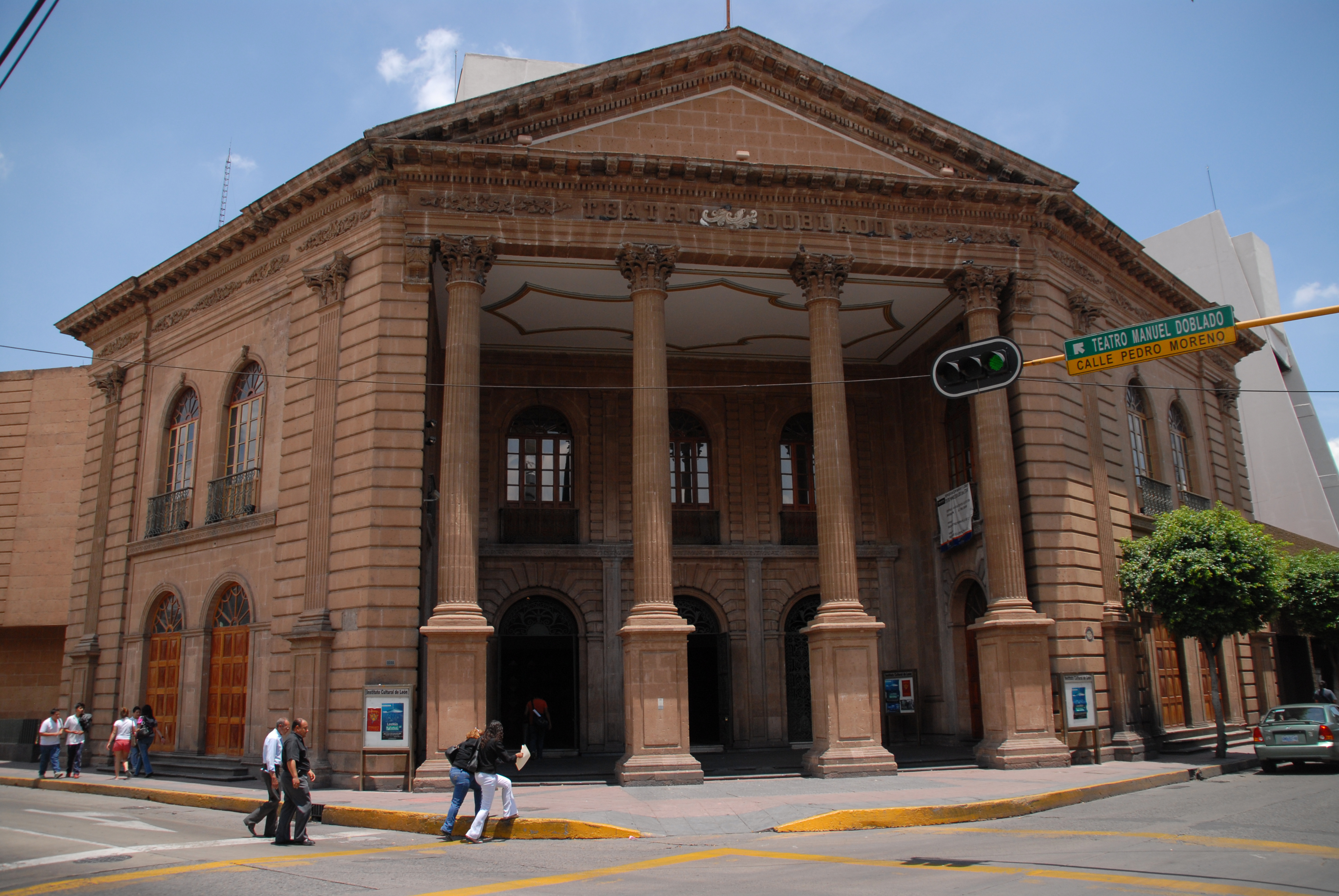
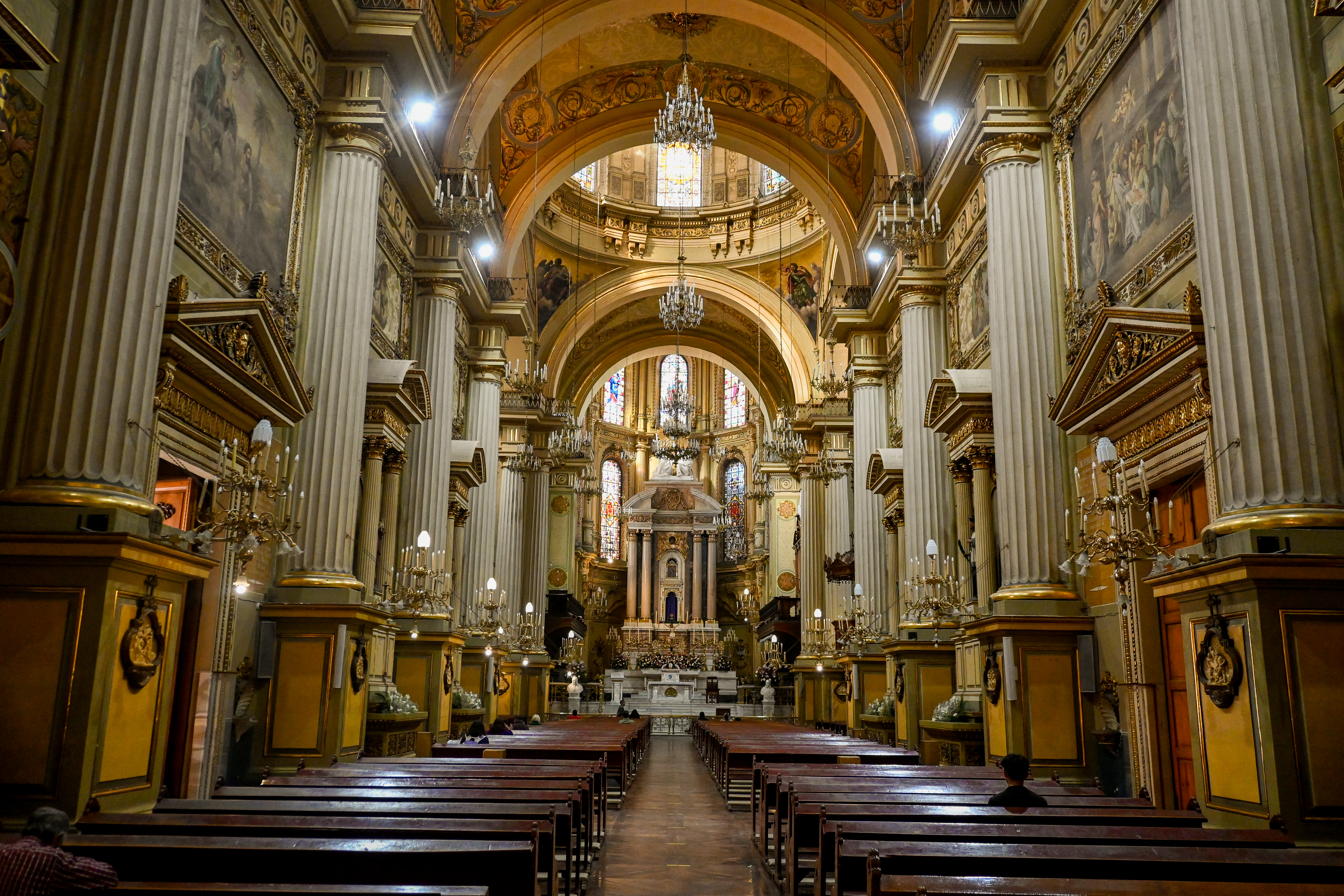
- Boulevard Adolfo López Mateos Arco de la Calzada Expiatory Temple Balloon Festival Municipal Palace Manuel Doblado Theater León Cathedral

- Flag Coat of arms
- Nicknames: The Pearl of the Bajío, Emerald City, World Capital of Footwear
- Motto(s): Spanish: El trabajo todo lo vence (English: Work overcomes everything)
- Location in Mexico León (Mexico)
- Coordinates: 21°07′N 101°41′W
- Country: Mexico
- State: Guanajuato
- Municipality: León
- Founded: 20 January 1576; 450 years ago
- Founded as: Villa de León
- Founder: Martín Enríquez de Almanza

Government
  - Mayor: Alejandra Gutiérrez Campos

Area
  - City: 218.4 km^{2} (84.3 sq mi)
- Elevation: 1,815 m (5,955 ft)

Population
  - Estimate (2026): 1,827,805
  - Rank: 17th in North America; 4th in Mexico
  - Urban: 2,076,088
  - Metro: 1,924,771
  - Demonym: Leonés(esa)

GDP (PPP, constant 2015 values)
  - Year: 2023
  - Total (Metro): $39.4 billion
  - Per capita: $20,800
- Time zone: UTC−6 (CST)
- Area code: +52
- Telephone exchange: 477 / 479
- Website: https://www.leon.gob.mx/

León (Spanish pronunciation: [leˈon]), officially León de Los Aldama, is the most populous city and municipal seat of the municipality of León in the Mexican state of Guanajuato. In the 2020 census, INEGI reported 1,579,803 people living in the city of León and 1,721,215 in the municipality, making it the fourth-most populous city and third-most populous municipality in Mexico. The metropolitan area of León recorded a population of 2,140,094 in the 2020 state census, making it the seventh most populous metropolitan area in Mexico. León is part of the macroregion of the Bajío within the Mexican Plateau, located roughly in the center of the country.

León has a large leather industry, making shoes, boots, belts, jackets, and other leather accessories for national and international markets. The leather industry earned its inhabitants the nickname of "green belly" (panzaverde in Spanish) because of the green tainting in the workers' bodies resulting from treating leather. Its hotel and service industry make it an important commercial center with numerous options for entertainment, gastronomy, leisure activities, arts, and recreation. It is also considered one of the most environmentally friendly cities in Mexico and has a high number of cyclists, in part because of integrating a network of bike lanes into the SIT system. In March 2012, it received an award as "City Water Champion", mainly due to great progress in the areas of sanitation, wastewater reuse, and energy cogeneration from biogas.

== History ==
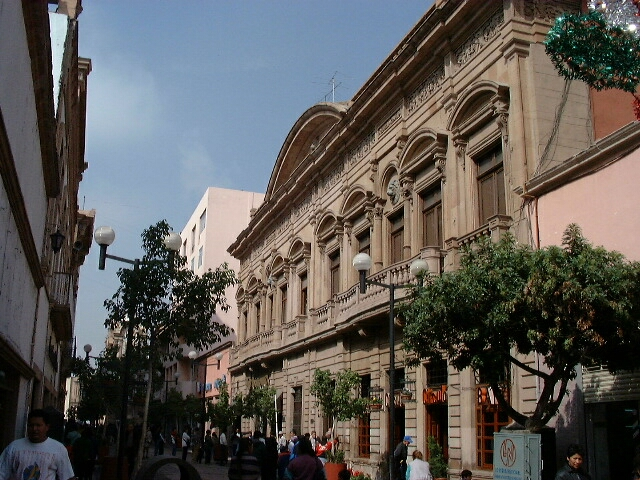
Madero street

=== Mesoamerica ===
In the León area there are ten distinct archeological zones, dating from the pre-classic Mesoamerican period. Most of these are identified with the Chupícuaro culture. By the Classic period, the area was under Teotihuacan and Toltec influence. In the 13th century, the Chichimecas, mostly of the Guamare and Guachichil subgroups, overran the area, migrating from an area of what is now San Luis Potosí. They remained through the Colonial period.

=== Colonial period ===
In 1530, Nuño Beltrán de Guzmán arrived with allied Purépecha Indians to the area, naming it Nuestra Señora. Homesteads were granted by the governor of Nueva Galicia Francisco Vásquez de Coronado to Spaniards Rodrigo de Vázquez and Juan de Jasso. Farming and cattle-raising were introduced here around 1546 by the Spaniards, but these settlers were under constant threat by the Chichimecas, who recognized the Spanish as invaders. These settlers requested assistance from the viceregal authorities in Mexico City.

As a response, viceroy Martín Enríquez de Almanza ordered the founding of a city here, with the name of León in 1575. To carry out the order, Juan Bautista de Orozco founded the village of León on 20 January 1576, creating its first town council and laying out its initial streets. In 1580, it attained the rank of "alcadía mayor" meaning it has governing authority of much of the land and smaller towns surrounding it from the Sierra de Comanja to the Lerma River. For example, two other towns founded in the area were San Miguel and Coecillo. In San Miguel, the Spaniards settled the Otomi peoples and in Coecillo were settled the Purépechas, Mexicas and the Chichimecas that did not oppose Spanish rule. As the population of the area grew, a number of municipalities would eventually break off, such as San Francisco del Rincón, Purísima del Rincón (Purísima Concepción), Cd. Manuel Doblado (San Pedro Piedra Gorda), Huanímaro, Abasolo, Cuerámaro and Pénjamo.

=== Jesuit reformer ===
In 1582, the first hospital of San Cosme y San Damián was established by Father Espino. The Jesuits arrived to León in 1731, founding the "Compañía Vieja" which is now the site of the Temple of the Immaculate. They also constructed the Temple of the New Company, which would become the cathedral, however they never finished it as they were expelled from Mexico in 1767. On 2 July 1732 arrived an image of Our Most Holy Mother of Light. She would later be declared the patron saint of the city, in 1849.

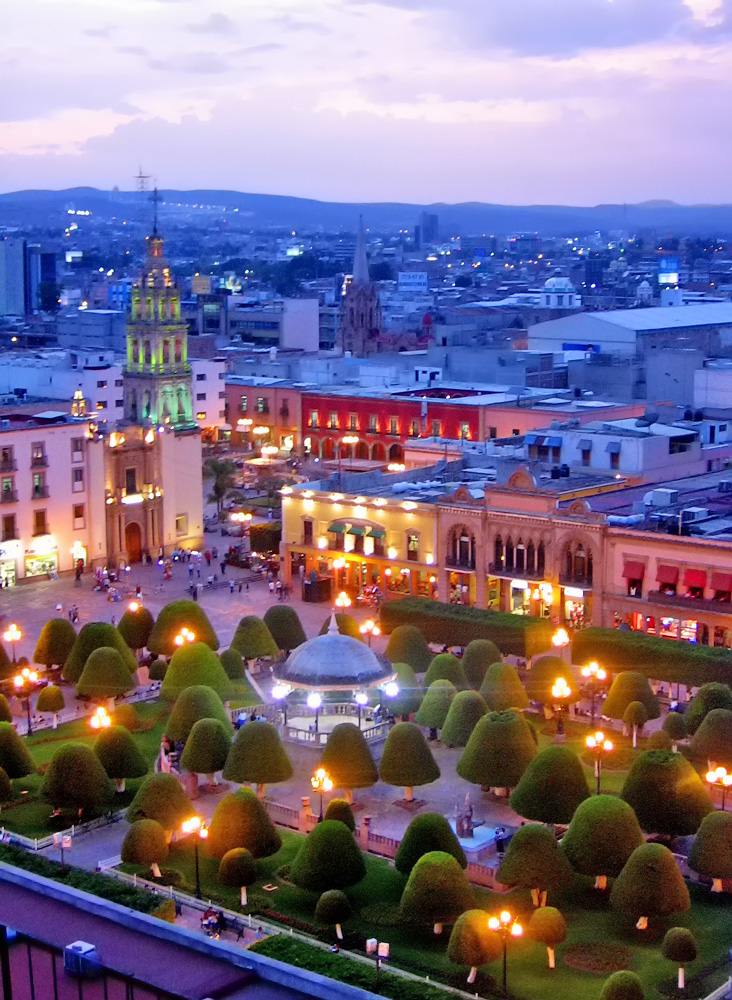
Main plaza

The population of the area suffered epidemics in 1643, droughts in 1630 and 1712–1714, famines in 1714 and 1786, and flooding in 1637, 1749, 1762, and 1803.

=== Mexican civil war ===
Independence forces under José Rafael de Iriarte arrived to the town on 4 October 1810. However, two months later royalist forces under Felix Calleja retook the locality, with insurrectionist sympathizers facing reprisals. About 2,000 insurgents on horses attacked the town but were repulsed by Count Pérez Gálvez. Royalist forces were attacked here in 1817 by Francisco Javier Mina without success. The town remained in royalist hands until the end of the Mexican War of Independence, when Agustín de Iturbide arrived. The town did not celebrate its first Grito de Dolores to mark independence until 1825. In 1827 it became one of the four "departments" of the newly created state of Guanajuato, and in 1830, it gained city status. In 1840, Father Ignacio Aguado founded the College of San Francisco de Sales and the College of La Madre Santísima was founded in 1844.

=== La Reforma ===
During La Reforma war, the city changed hands various times between Liberal and Conservative forces between 1858 and 1860. The most notable battle of that war here was when General José Iniesta attacked the town on 18 February 1859. In that same year, León even separated for a time from the rest of the state of Guanajuato.

In 1862, the bishopric of León was founded, separating the city of León and nine other municipalities such as Irapuato, Guanajuato and Dolores Hidalgo from the bishopric of Michoacán. Bishop Diez de Sollano opened the Conciliar Seminary in 1864. This bishop consecrated the Basilica Cathedral in 1866, even though it was not completed, giving the image of the Virgin of the Light a permanent home.

=== French occupation ===
From 1863 to 1866, the French occupied León during the French Intervention, with Emperor Maximillian visiting the city in 1864. His arrival was much celebrated here, with fireworks and a hot air balloon exhibition put on by the Alemán brothers. However, when Liberal forces finally had permanent control over the town, two incidents occurred. On 30 September 1867, Coronel Cecilio Delgado Estrada ordered his men to shoot over the heads of people who prayed in the streets, causing some to be wounded. Another incident of this type occurred in 1877. The second was more permanent. The Liberals decommissioned the convent and college of Saints Peter and Paul, converting it into offices for city government. It remains such to this day.

=== Contested elections ===
On 2 January 1946, a mob gathered in the plaza in front of the municipal palace to protest elections seen as illegitimate. These protesters were fired upon, killing many. This plaza has been named the "Plaza of the Martyrs" in their honor.

== Geography ==
=== Climate ===
Leon generally has a humid subtropical climate (Köppen: Cwa) with summer rainfall (according to Köppen climate classification, Cwa) that closely borders on a semi-arid climate. The average annual temperature is 19.9 °C (67.8 °F), the warmest month is May with a maximum average of 31.7 °C (89.1 °F), and the coolest month is January with a minimum average temperature of 7.7 °C (45.9 °F). Outside the city microclimate island, the ranges tend to be higher, with maximum averages reaching 2 °C higher than in the city, and minimum averages lowered by 3 °C or more. In the villages located in between the northern mountains the climate changes; it is considered subtropical highland climate (Cwb according to Köppen climate classification), the average annual temperature is around 16 °C (61 °F).

Leon averages 681 mm (26.8 in) of precipitation annually, which mainly occurs during the summer and early autumn (from late May through October) generally with thunderstorms in the evening. There is usually a discrepancy about whether Leon's valley is either sub-humid or semi-arid. Depending on the methodology, it can be considered as being either one or the other. With Köppen's methodology, there needs to be more than 678 millimetres (27 in) of annual precipitation for Leon to be considered as humid subtropical; according to several weather stations it may have both (humid subtropical and semiarid) terminologies applied to it. The years considered in the study may also be a determinant factor (more frequently used for international purposes is a 30-year data compilation). Years of average rainfall are rare; the usual pattern is bi-modal, with some large string of dry years usually related to La Niña phenomenon (slightly higher than 300 millimetres (12 in)) followed by other years (around 5) related to El Niño that make up the average (with higher than 39 inches or 990 millimetres). Snowfall is extremely rare. The latest snowfall recorded in Leon was in 1997, although there have been other years of registered slushy snow since 1997.

Climate data for Downtown Leon (1991-2020, extremes 1947-present)
Month	Jan	Feb	Mar	Apr	May	Jun	Jul	Aug	Sep	Oct	Nov	Dec	Year
Record high °C (°F)	30.0 (86.0)	34.0 (93.2)	35.5 (95.9)	37.0 (98.6)	40.0 (104.0)	38.0 (100.4)	34.5 (94.1)	36.0 (96.8)	35.0 (95.0)	37.0 (98.6)	33.0 (91.4)	36.5 (97.7)	40.0 (104.0)
Mean daily maximum °C (°F)	24.1 (75.4)	26.4 (79.5)	28.8 (83.8)	31.1 (88.0)	32.1 (89.8)	29.9 (85.8)	27.7 (81.9)	27.8 (82.0)	27.3 (81.1)	27.4 (81.3)	26.0 (78.8)	24.6 (76.3)	27.8 (82.0)
Daily mean °C (°F)	16.2 (61.2)	18.1 (64.6)	20.3 (68.5)	22.7 (72.9)	24.1 (75.4)	23.4 (74.1)	21.6 (70.9)	21.7 (71.1)	21.3 (70.3)	20.3 (68.5)	18.4 (65.1)	16.8 (62.2)	20.4 (68.7)
Mean daily minimum °C (°F)	8.3 (46.9)	9.8 (49.6)	11.8 (53.2)	14.3 (57.7)	16.2 (61.2)	16.8 (62.2)	15.5 (59.9)	15.6 (60.1)	15.3 (59.5)	13.3 (55.9)	10.8 (51.4)	9.0 (48.2)	13.1 (55.6)
Record low °C (°F)	0.0 (32.0)	−1.5 (29.3)	0.0 (32.0)	3.0 (37.4)	8.5 (47.3)	7.0 (44.6)	7.0 (44.6)	3.0 (37.4)	5.0 (41.0)	3.0 (37.4)	1.0 (33.8)	−2.5 (27.5)	−2.5 (27.5)
Average precipitation mm (inches)	12.8 (0.50)	13.3 (0.52)	8.9 (0.35)	8.2 (0.32)	28.1 (1.11)	119.8 (4.72)	187.9 (7.40)	170.4 (6.71)	126.1 (4.96)	37.7 (1.48)	9.9 (0.39)	7.2 (0.28)	730.3 (28.75)
Average precipitation days (≥ 0.1 mm)	2.6	2.0	2.1	2.0	6.3	12.7	17.8	14.8	12.3	5.8	2.0	1.5	81.9
Source: Servicio Meteorologico Nacional

=== Cityscape ===
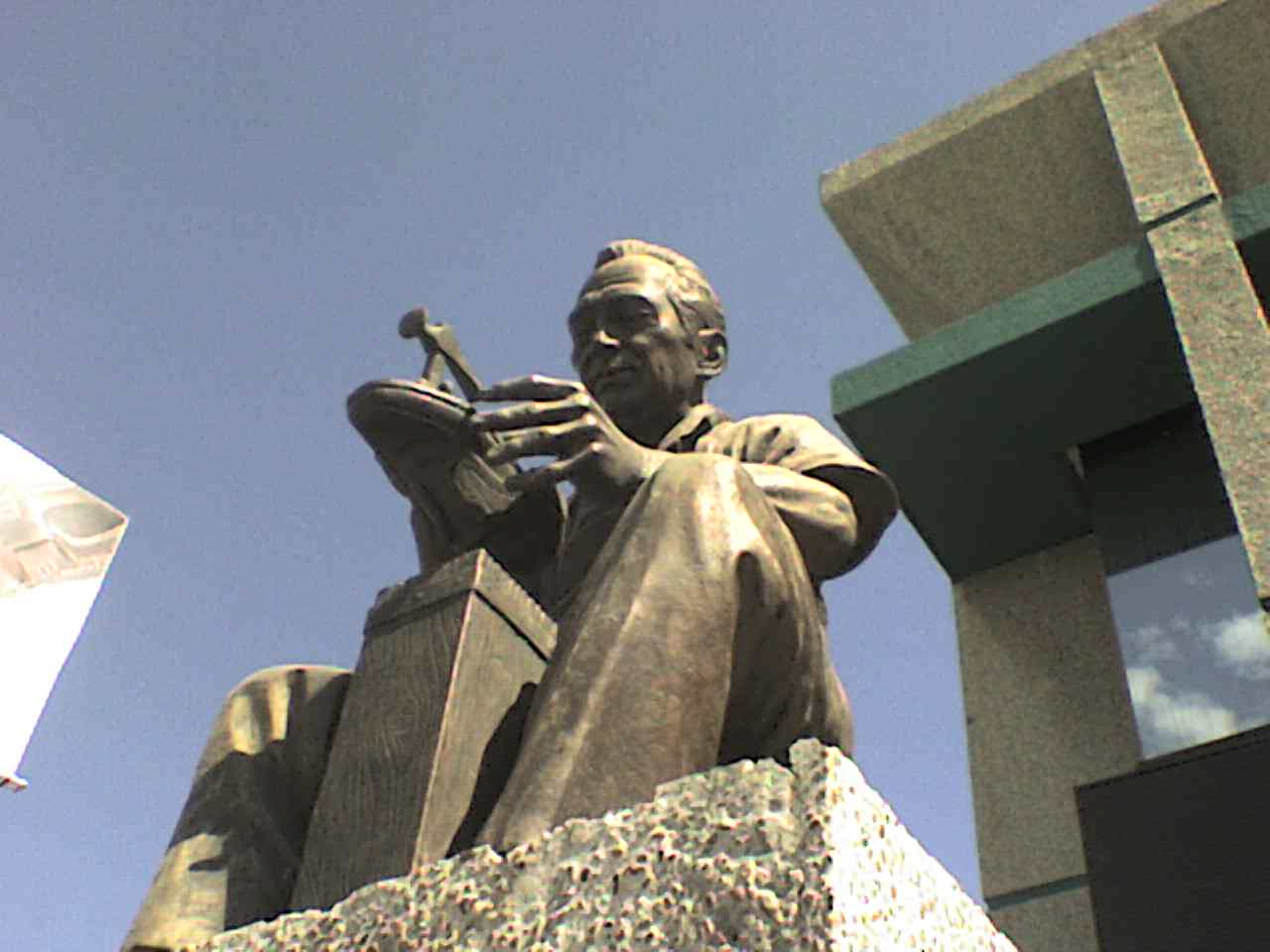
Monument to the shoemaker

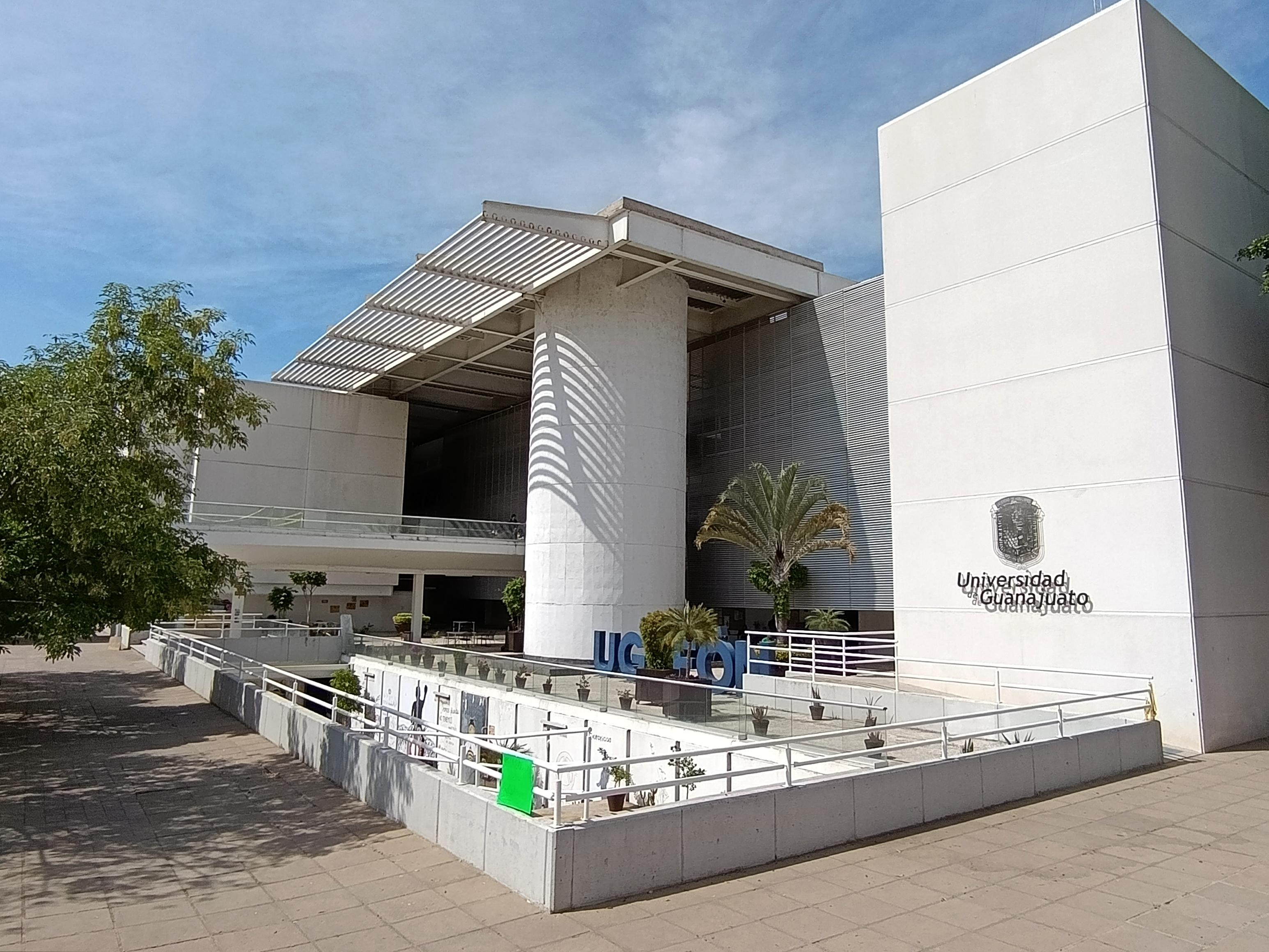
Universidad de Guanajuato

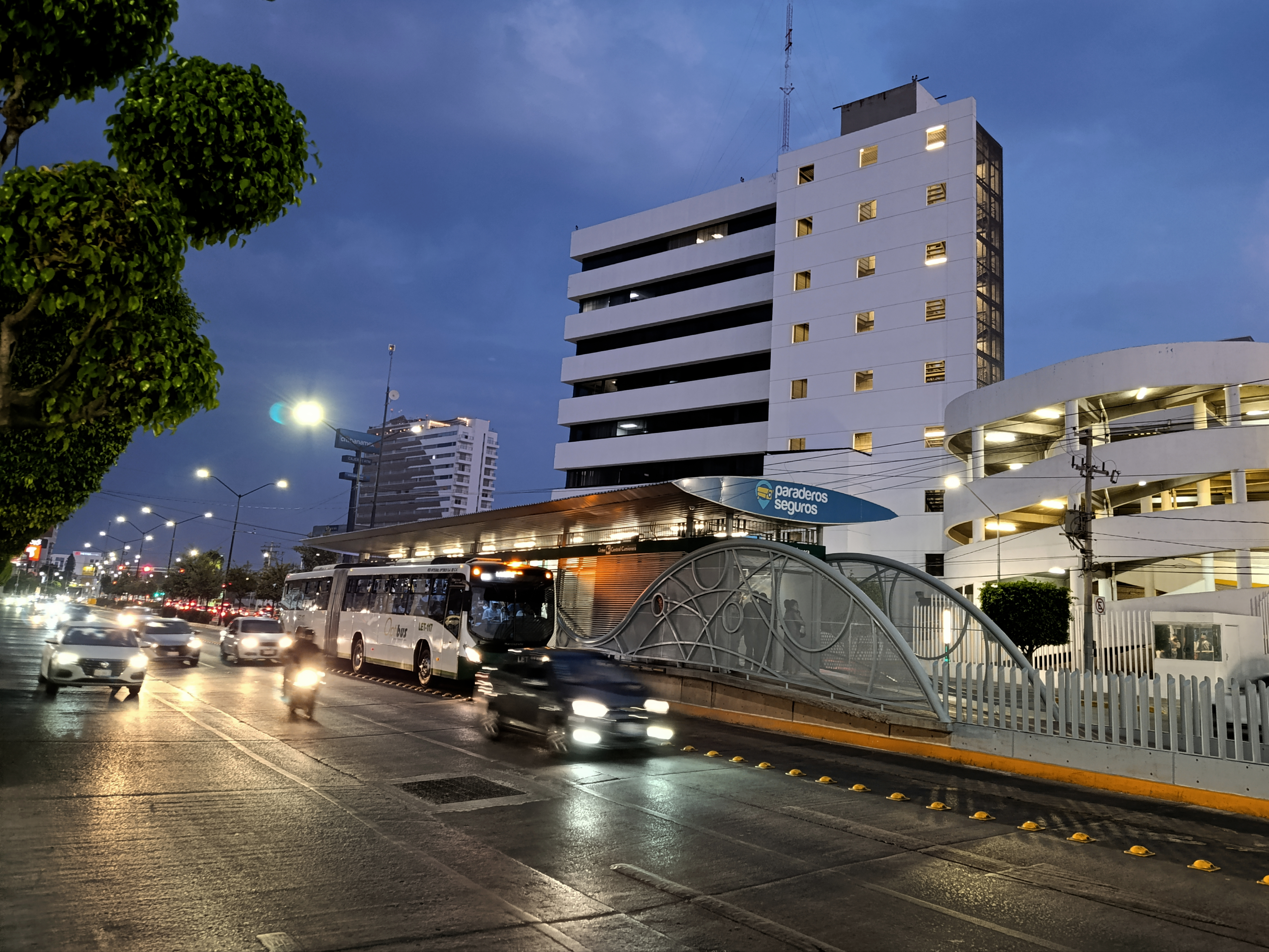
Optibus bus stop

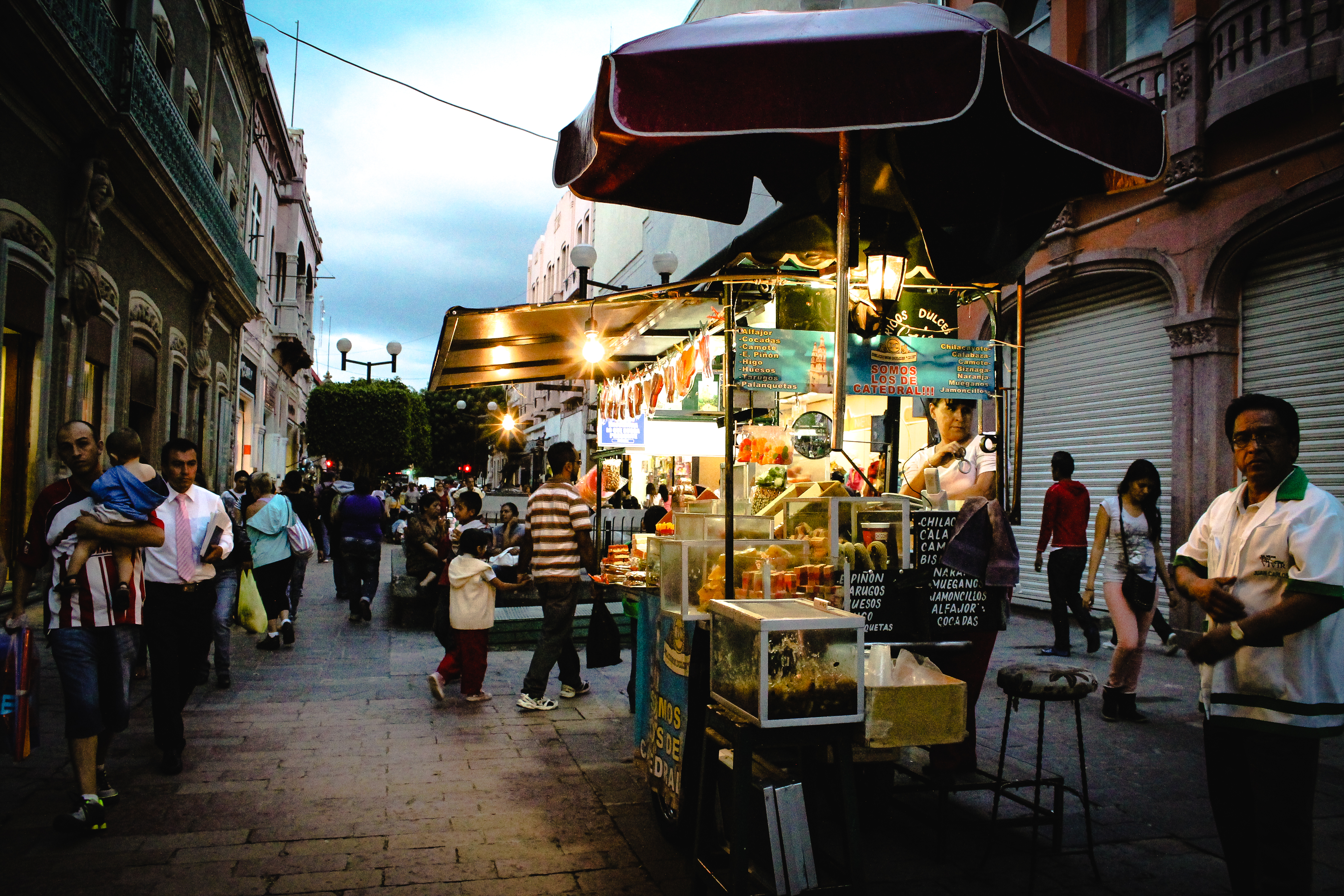
Street food stand

== Economy ==
=== Industrial parks ===
About 70 percent of all shoes made in Mexico come from León and the surrounding area. In addition to the Leather crafting, there are also industrial chemical, plastic, polymer, transportation, and container companies. The presence of the automotive industry includes a General Motors plant in the nearby municipality of Silao. In the financial sector, León is home to the national headquarters of Banco del Bajío, owned by Salvador Oñate, and to the regional headquarters of Banamex, and HSBC, among other banks.

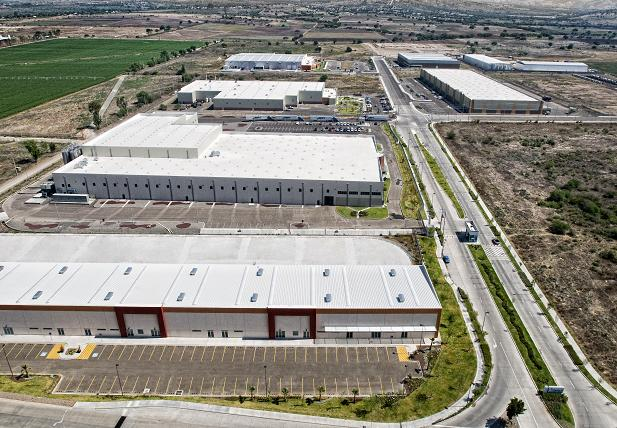
Santa Fe Industrial Parks

=== Customs facility ===
A newly built facility within GTO Inland Port's premises speeds up the logistics process. Clearing customs in a border city or seaport is no longer a requirement for the companies located in GTO Inland Port. They now use this newly made facility.

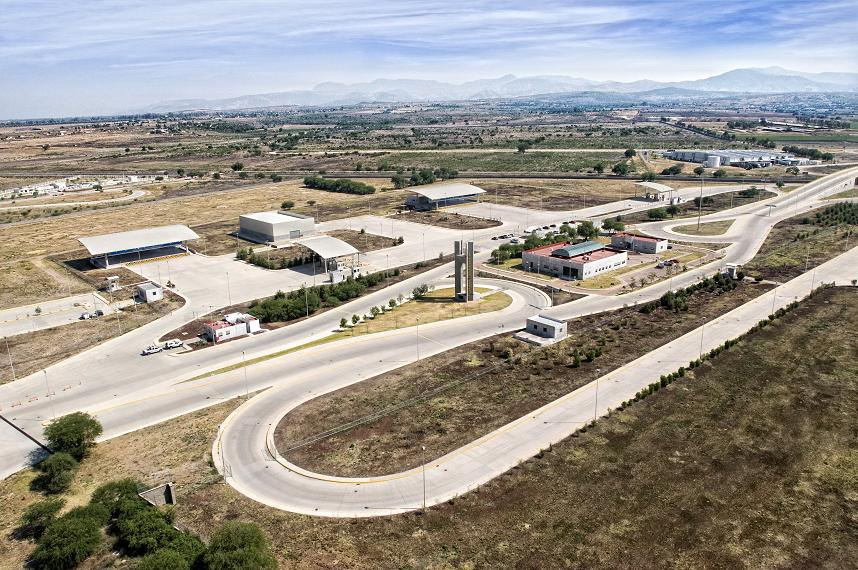
Customs within GTO Inland Port

=== Rail container facility ===
A rail container yard is now offering inter-modal services for rail transportation. The facility is operated by the largest rail company in Mexico and has one of the longest rail spurs in the country.

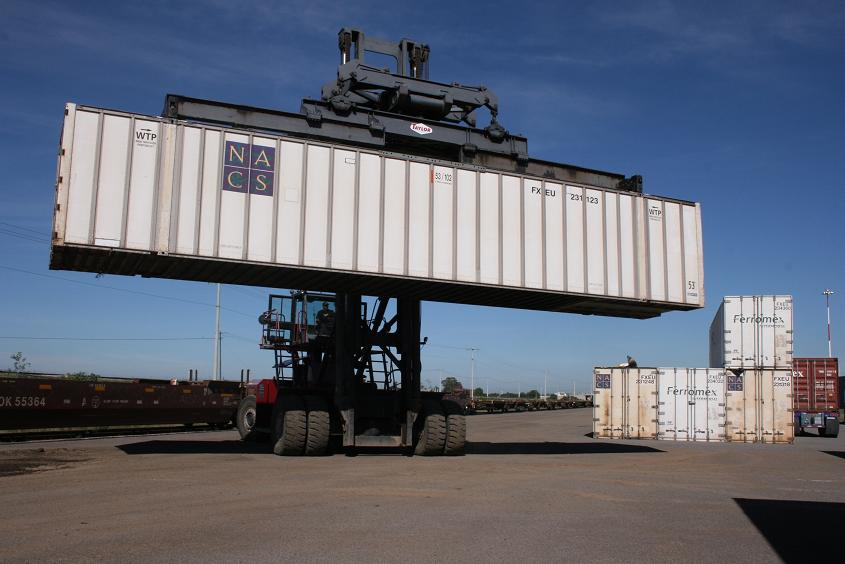
GPI Railyard

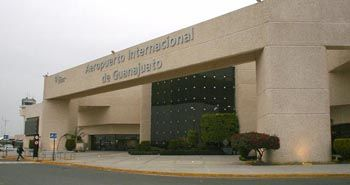
Del Bajío International Airport

=== Expositions ===
In the Poliforum there are trade fairs throughout the year. The principal two are Sapica (Shoe Fair), and ANPIC (suppliers of the shoe industry).

=== Retailing ===
León has several regional shopping malls:

- Altacia, anchored by Liverpool, Cinépolis multicinemas and the Sealand aquarium,
- City Center León (under construction), a 29,500 m^{2} (318,000 sq ft) mixed-use development with offices, 2 hotels, retail, apartments and a Cinépolis
- Factory Shops León, a (63,000 m^{2} (680,000 sq ft) 740-million-peso (38-million-USD) outlet mall)
- Plaza Galerías Las Torres, anchored by Walmart, Coppel and Cinépolis
- Plaza Mayor, the largest mall in León, 117,000 m^{2} gross leasable area, of which 70,000 m^{2} retail floor space, and parking for 2,500 cars. Anchored by sears, Liverpool (planned to expand to 27,000 m^{2}, West Elm, Innovasport, Sanborns, and with a Best Buy under that company stopped operations in Mexico. It will add a ca. 30,000-m^{2} Palacio de Hierro under construction, to open in 2024. León is one of only eight metropolitan areas in Mexico to boast a full-line Palacio store, a reflection on that company's hopes for the high-end retail potential of León and other nearby cities in El Bajío such as San Miguel de Allende and Guanajuato city.

== Historic sites ==
=== Cathedral ===
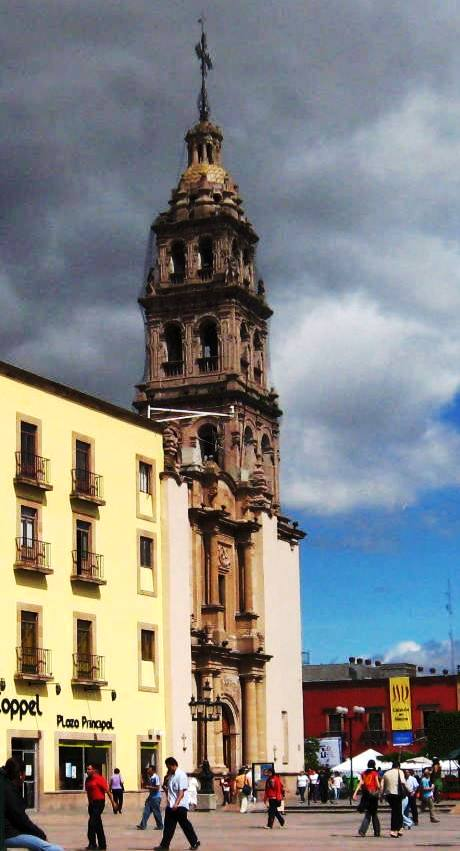
Church of St. Sebastian at Mártires del 2 de Enero Square

The main church is called the Cathedral Basilica of Our Lady of the Light and is the seat of the Archdiocese of Leon. Construction of the church was begun in 1746 by the Jesuits and is a combination of Baroque and Neo Classic architectural styles. Construction was halted only eight months after it began when the Jesuit order was expelled from Mexico by the Spanish Crown. The Obregon family, however, took over its construction, continuing into the 19th century. The Archdiocese of Leon was created in 1864, with its first bishop, José María de Jesús Diez de Sollano y Dávalos helping to get the towers and cupola completed as he chose the church as the seat. It was finally completed and consecrated on 16 March 1866. Pope Benedict XVI officiated a mass here in 2012.

=== Expiatorio ===
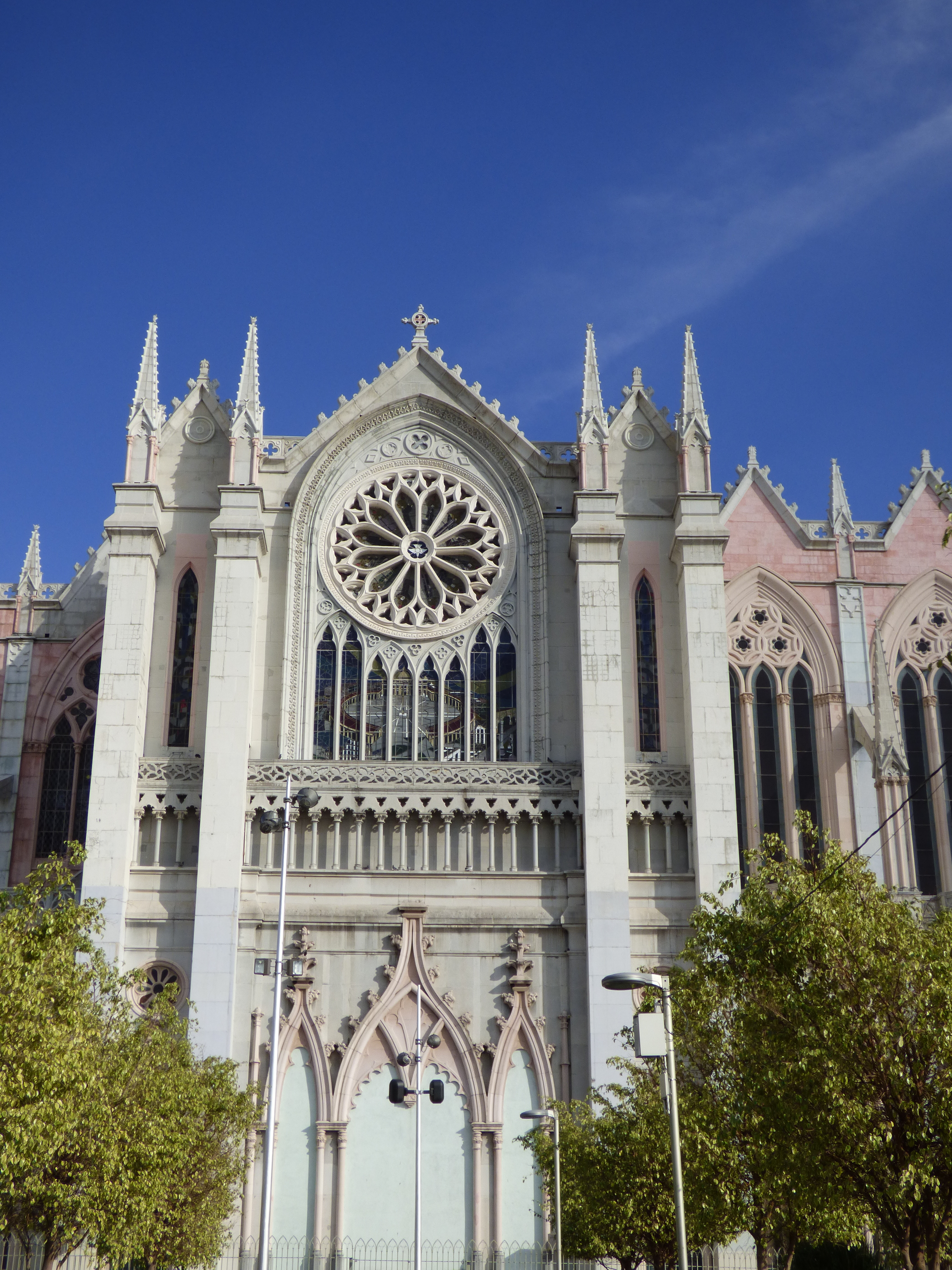
Detail of the façade of the Templo Expiatorio

Its full name is the Santuario Expiatorio del Sagrado Corazón de Jesús (Expiatory Sanctuary of the Sacred Heart of Jesus). Construction of this shrine was begun in 1920 by Bernardo Chavez with the support of Bishop Emeterio Valverde y Téllez. It is neo-Gothic in design, based on the old European medieval cathedrals but much of the outside wallspace is without decoration. Its work was halted by the Cristero Wars. Since then construction has continued off and on and it is considered 90% complete. An important source of income for the shrine's construction is the sale of crypts. This practice was begun in 1924. A chapel dedicated to the Virgin of Lourdes was begun in 1935 and later a chapel dedicated to the Virgin of Guadalupe, which is separate from the main building, built between 1935 and 1939. A shrine with stained glass windows includes local allegories.

=== Municipal Palace ===
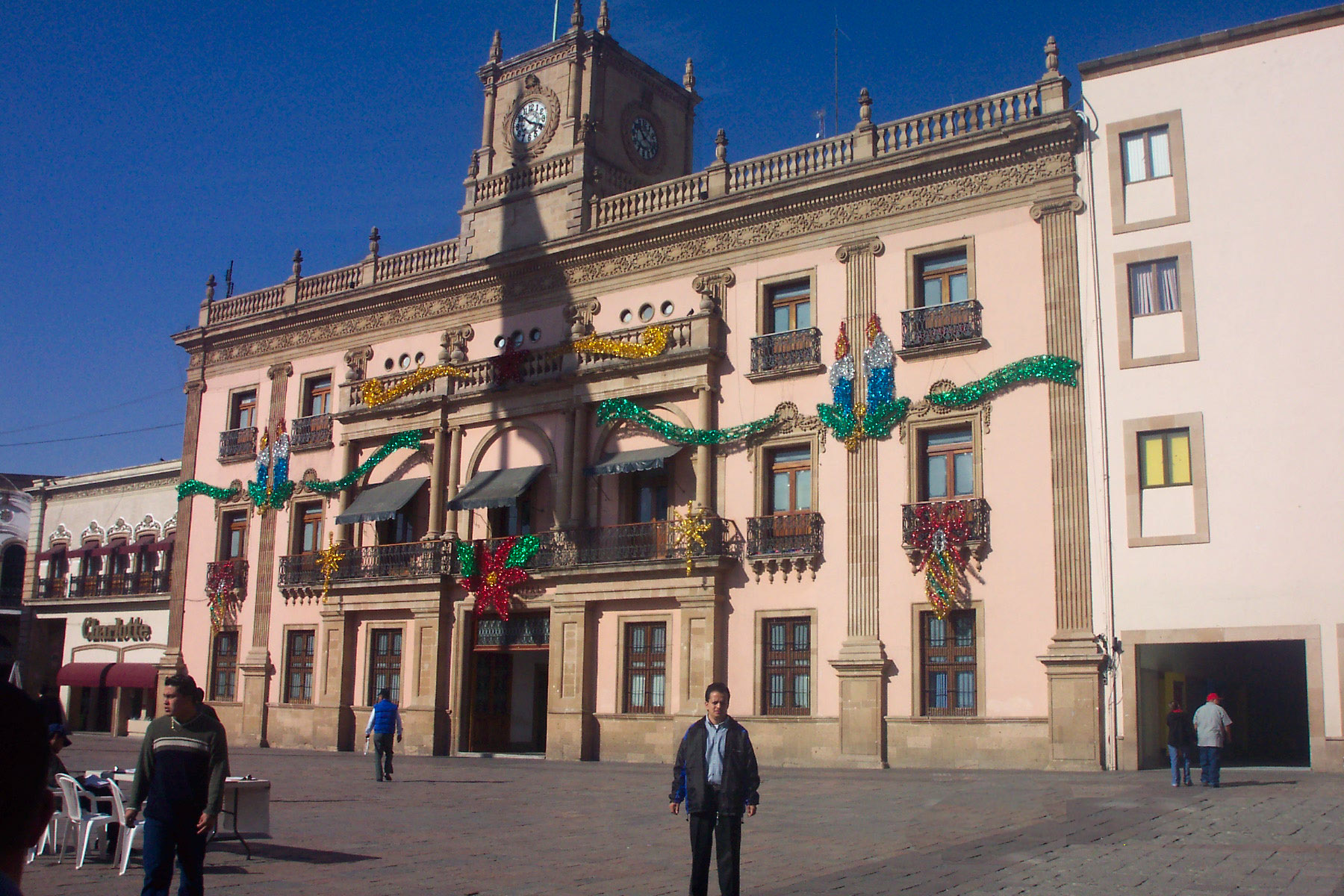
Municipal Palace

The current Municipal Palace is of the Ionic order and occupies part of the site of the old "Colegio Grande del Seminario de los Padres Paulinos" (Grand Seminary College for Pauline Priests) who had to abandon the city in 1860.

From 1861 to 1867 it was a military barracks. After the French Intervention, it was remodeled to conserve its original architecture by Coronel Octaviano Rosado to become the seat of government on 21 March 1869. The patio of the building contains (in 1972) a bronze statue of Benito Juárez to commemorate the centennial of his death. Since then, the building has had a number of additions such as the dome that now covers this patio, and a number of murals. These murals were painted in 1972 and 1973 by Jesus Gallardo covering the walls of the main stairwell and the hallway of the upper floor around the patio.

=== Millennium's Gate ===
The monument was built to celebrate the arrival of the new millennium and has become a landmark. The 45-meter tall tower on five plinths was completed on time for New Year's Day 2000. The 5,400 square meter plaza is planted with trees. The project cost 4.5 million pesos.

=== Arch of the Causeway of the Heroes (Arco de la Calzada de los Héroes) ===
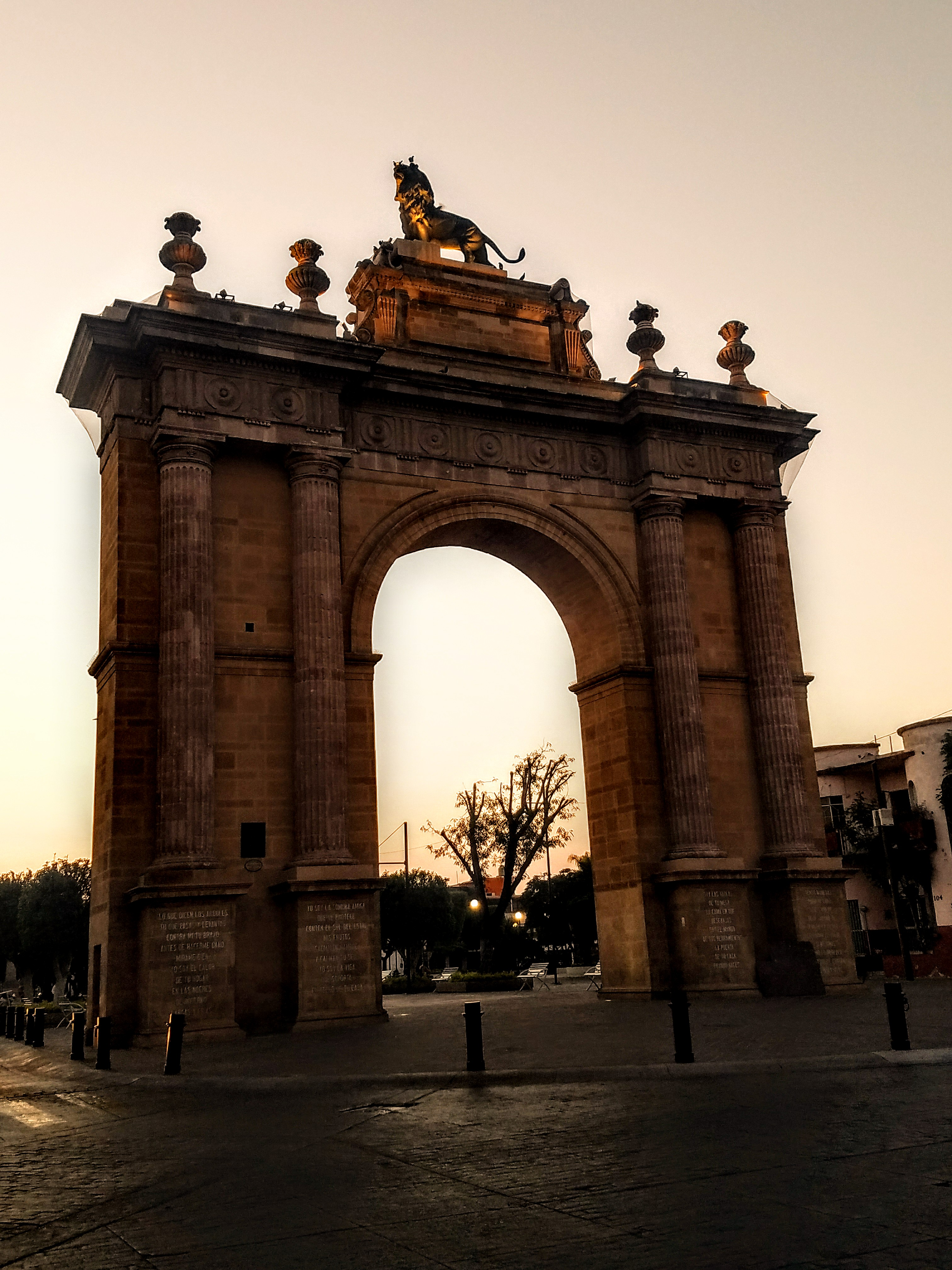
Causeway Arch's Heroes

This arch (Arco de la Calzada de los Héroes, in Spanish), topped by a bronze lion, began construction in 1896 and has been modified a number of times since then. The first lion was added in 1943 by Francisco Lozornio Castillo made of bricks and mortar. This was replaced by the bronze one in 1958. The idea for a bronze lion was that of the matador Antonio Velázquez, a native of Leon, whose bravery in the ring earned him the nickname of the "Heart of Leon" ("Corazón de León", in Spanish). Not long before his death in 1959, he complained that the brick lion should be replaced with a better work of art, causing something of a commotion in the Leon community. This caught the attention of sculptor Humberto Peraza Ojeda who made the one that sits atop the arch today.

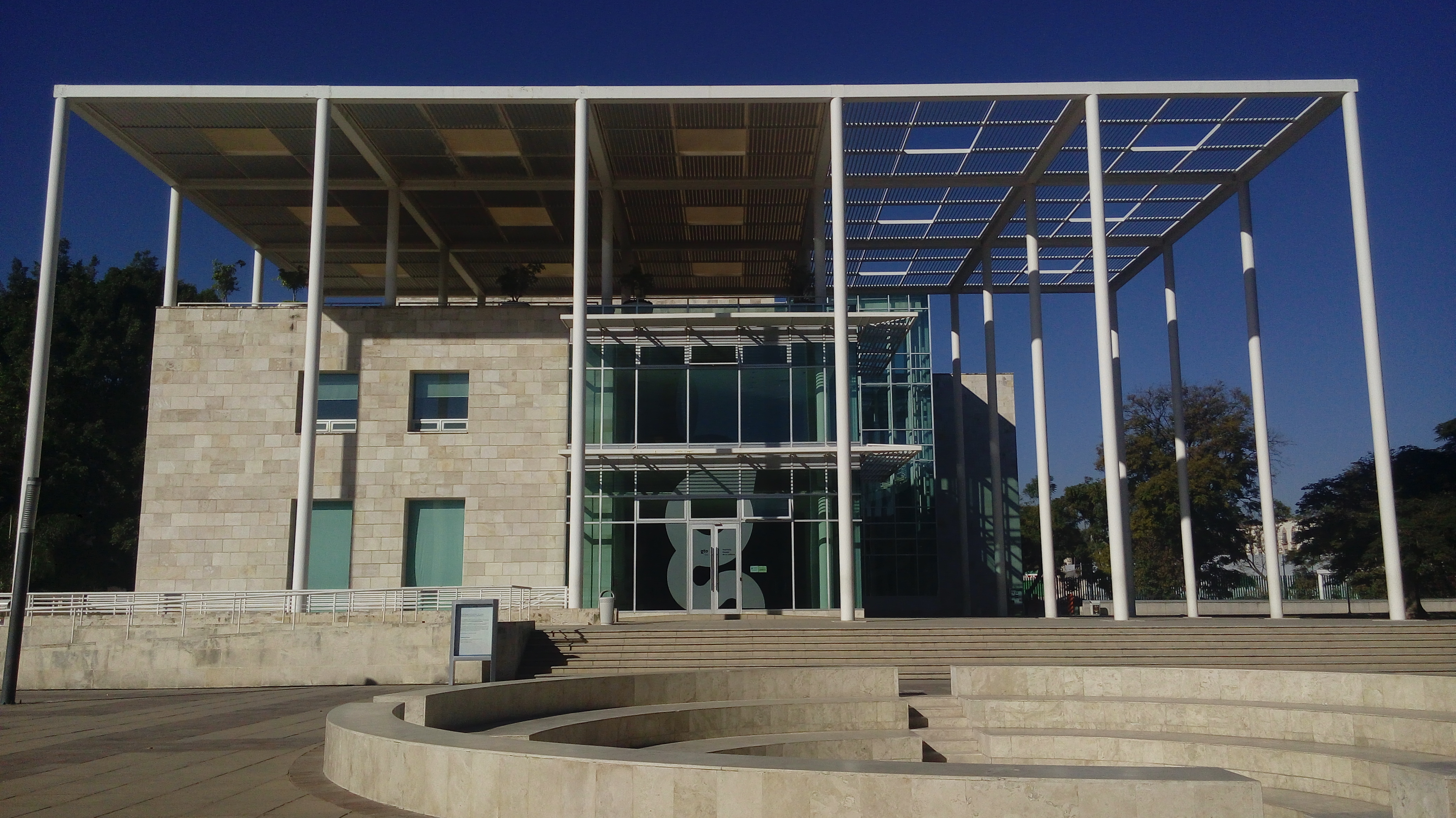
Wigberto Jiménez Moreno State Library

== Arts and culture ==
=== Forum Cultural Guanajuato ===
It is a cultural complex, entertainment and artistic formation space that promotes the professionalization of regional artists, the formation of audiences, as well as cultural tourism. It has several spaces:

- Wigberto Jiménez Moreno State Library: With more than 170 thousand volumes, the State Institute of Culture offers the services of this library with a capacity to attend up to 2 thousand 400 users per day, through: General reading room, Children's Library and Baby's Library, Specialized Collections and Braille Room.
- Guanajuato's Art and History Museum: The cultural identity, the historical roots, the evolution and the artistic production of Guanajuato, from prehistory to the present day, are the collection and vocation of this Museum that has: Regional history and art room, Sculpture room, Temporary Exhibition Hall, Mateo Herrera Auditorium and Bookstore.
- Bicentennial Theater: Being considered as the best opera theater in Latin America, it is an avant-garde venue with the capacity to accommodate 1,500 people and where you can enjoy various artistic expressions such as: Opera, Music, Theater and Dance.
- Academic Unit for Culture and Art: Attached to the University of Guanajuato, it offers the following programs: Degree in Culture and Art, Diploma, Workshops and Courses.

== Explora Park ==
This recreational park is tailored towards families. The Explora park has walking paths and areas of green grass. There is a body of water in the park with a bridge. There is also a zip line, life-size aircraft, and a science building.

== Transportation ==
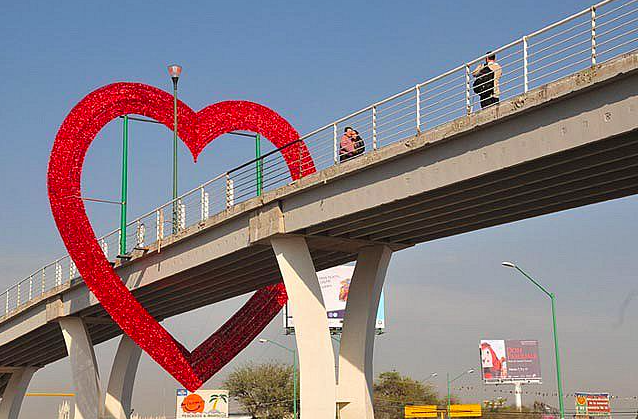
Puente de los Enamorados

=== Del Bajío International Airport ===
The Del Bajío International Airport (Guanajuato International Airport) serves the city, although it is located in the neighboring city of Silao.

=== Cycling ===
The city's bicycle paths are extensive. Leon is one of the most bicycle-friendly large cities in Latin America. Together biking and walking account for more than 39% of the total trips, one of the highest values in Latin American cities.

=== Integrated Transportation System ===
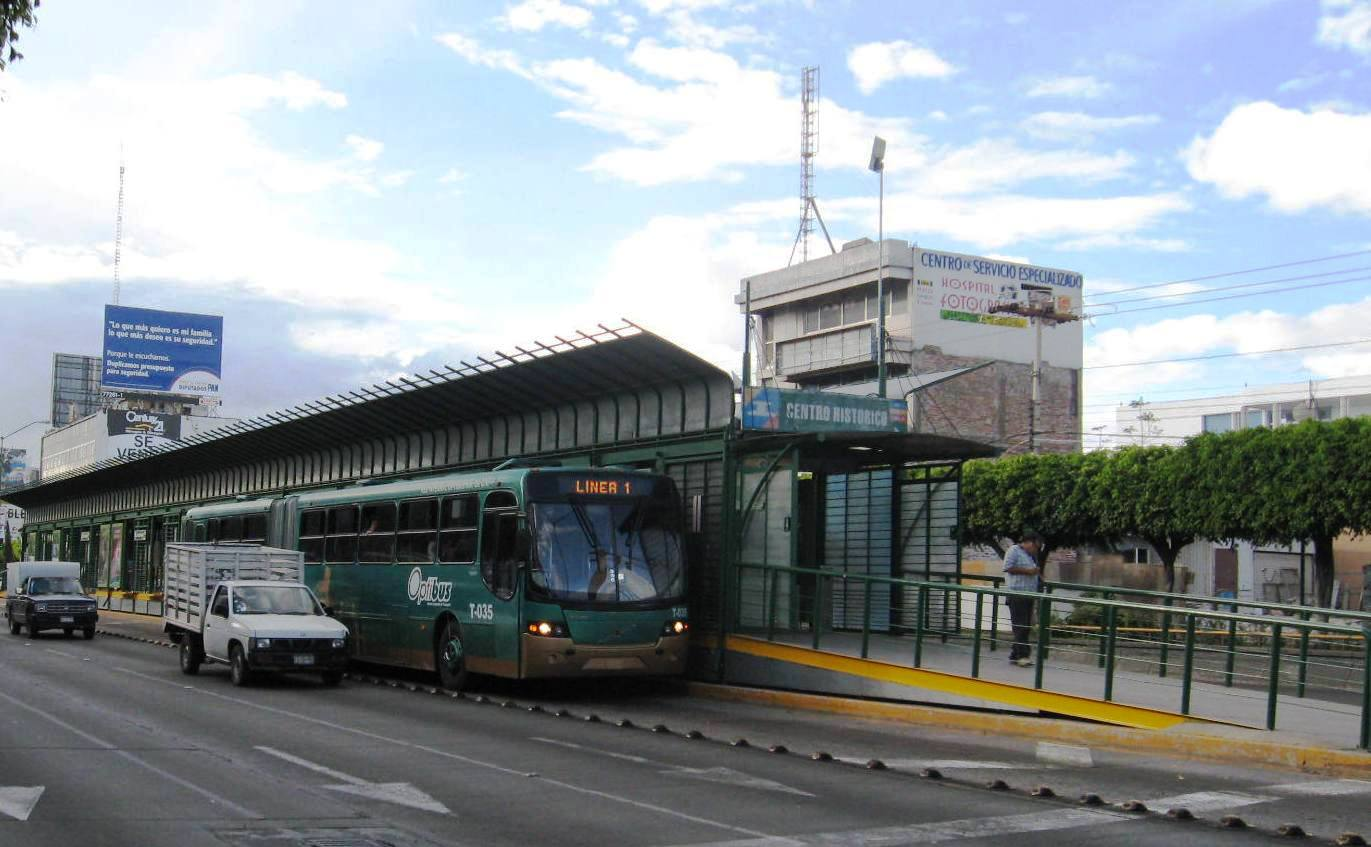
Transport's Integrated System

Integrated Transportation System (ITS) (Sistema Integrado de Transporte in Spanish) refers to the development and implementation of a Bus rapid transit system named "Optibús". Since 28 September 2003, the Integrated Transport Optibús has operated despite an existing need for a subway system "Metro", which originally was planned construction with two lines.

The system was the first of its kind in Mexico. Leon was the first city in the country with a BRT system, before it was implemented in Mexico City as Metrobús and Guadalajara as Macrobús.

Optibús System The current route system is divided into four categories. These are:

- Trunk routes: They consist of eight main lines that cross the city from end to end. The buses are also known as Orugas (caterpillars in Spanish) due to its articulated midsection. They have capacity for 175 passengers. The Optibús transit system consists of 52 stations located in the central area of the main avenues of the city.
- Feeder and auxiliary routes: These are urban bus routes that were integrated into the regular system, as a stop as they have one or more transfer stations, and are identified by the letter A (feeder route / yellow decals) or X (auxiliary route / blue decals).
- Conventional routes: These routes circulate through most of the city and are distinguished by having the corporative colors from its owners: orange, red, pink, purple, and green.
- Suburban roads: Roads circulate outside or on the city edge communities as Comanjilla, Duarte, Loza de los Padres, La Hacienda, etc.

There are currently three permanent transfer stations (San Jeronimo, Delta de Jerez and San Juan Bosco), two micro-stations (Santa Rita - Parque Juarez), which are the endpoints for trunk routes, feeder routes and auxiliary routes. Passengers at these stations are allowed to transfer without cost from any of these lines.

In addition, as a control measure, the "PagoBús" system has been instituted; this is an electronic card system that allows users to streamline their access to stations and bus and thus save money. There are 2 types of cards: Preferential and General, cost rates with 50 and 15% lower total cost.

The environmental benefits of the system are also high, not least because the system introduced articulated buses using Euro IV technology and ultra low sulfur, resulting in 5,600 tons of CO_{2} reduction annually.

=== Public transportation statistics ===
The average amount of time people spend commuting with public transit in León, for example to and from work, on a weekday is 78 min. 21% of public transit riders, ride for more than 2 hours every day. The average amount of time people wait at a stop or station for public transit is 20 min, while 40% of riders wait for over 20 minutes on average every day. The average distance people usually ride in a single trip with public transit is 5.1 km, while 2% travel for over 12 km in a single direction.

== Education and research ==
=== Universities ===
- Universidad de Guanajuato
- National Autonomous University of Mexico
- Ibero-American University
- Monterrey Institute of Technology and Higher Education
- Universidad Tecnológica de México (UNITEC) Campus León
- Instituto Politécnico Nacional (UPIIG-IPN) Campus Guanajuato
- Polytechnic of Guanajuato
- Instituto Tecnológico de León
- Universidad de León
- Universidad De La Salle Bajío
- Universidad Tecnológica de León

== Sports ==
Team	SPORTS	League	Venue
Club León	Association football	Liga MX	Estadio León
Bravos de León	Baseball	Mexican Baseball League	Estadio Domingo Santana
Abejas de León	Basketball	Liga Nacional de Baloncesto Profesional	Domo de la Feria

=== Football ===
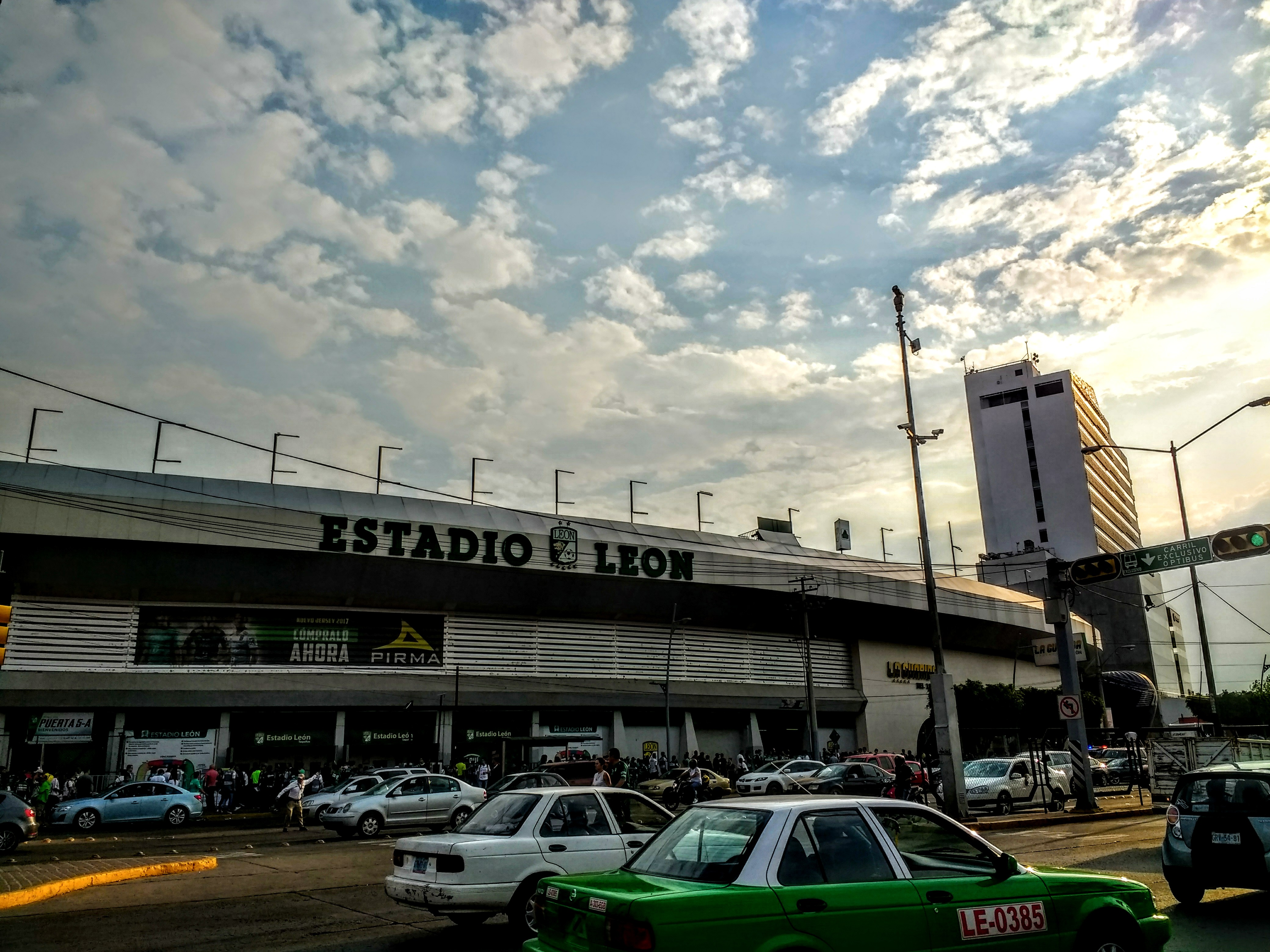
Nou Camp (León FC's Stadium)

The city's main professional Association football team is Club León, which is one of the foremost teams in Mexico, eight-time league champion, now playing in the Liga MX. The team's stadium, Estadio León, also bears a Catalan name: Nou Camp. FIFA World Cup games have been played there (1970 and 1986).

A new franchise with the name of Curtidores appeared in the Primera División A in the mid-1990s, but, after being champion in 1999 and earning the right to play in the Primera División, was sold and moved to Puebla to become Puebla, F.C. In 2007 a new franchise named Union de Curtidores began playing at Segunda división. Nowadays, there are several football teams in the city playing in the Tercera División: Atlético ECCA, Juventud Cuerera and Conmudaj, among some others. Club Leon also has a women's section that plays in Liga MX Femenil.

=== Rally Mexico (WRC) ===
Since 2004 the city has hosted the headquarters of Rally Mexico located at the Centro de Convenciones Poliforum Leon, which is one round of the World Rally Championship. Thousands of fans camp at the nearby Sierra de Lobos and Sierra de Guanajuato mountains to watch the rally; the service park is also located and visited by fans at the Poliforum Leon. The Rally takes place in three cities: Guanajuato, Silao and León.

=== Basketball ===
Since 2004, León has a basketball team, Lechugueros, which plays in the Liga Nacional de Baloncesto Profesional (LNBP). They play in the Domo de la Feria (formerly known as Auditorio Municipal). Before this team, the city had other professional basketball teams: Lechugueros (original franchise), Zapateros, Pony-León and Atléticos. These teams participated in the CIMEBA (Circuito Mexicano de Básquetbol), which was the main basketball league of Mexico in the 1970s and 1980s.

=== Baseball ===
León had two baseball teams in the Liga Mexicana de Beisbol: Cachorros de León, in the late 1970s, and Bravos de León, in the late 80's. Bravos, after becoming champions of the league in 1990, and due to financial problems, were sold and moved to Minatitlán, Veracruz. After many years of unsuccessful attempts to bring back baseball to Leon it was announced on 1 November 2016, by the assembly of presidents of the Mexican League, the approval the entry of Leon, Guanajuato, subject to certain conditions. The Bravos De Leon returned to play in 2017.

=== Tennis ===
León has been a host city for the yearly ATP Challenger Tour since 1992.

=== Golf ===
León hosts an annual event on the Web.com Tour. In 2015 the event was held from 13 to 19 April.

== Notable people ==
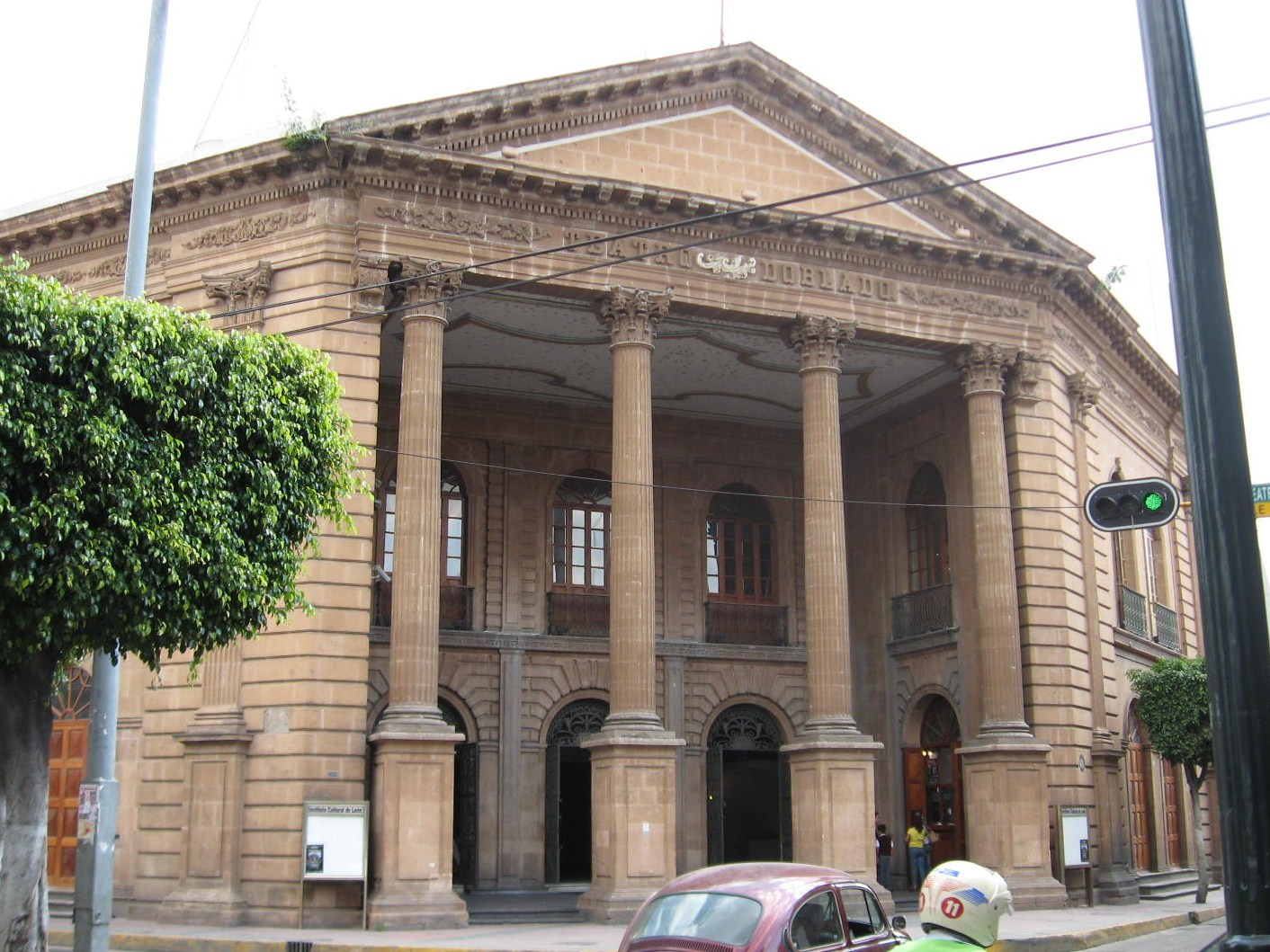
The Theatre Doblado, located in the historic cente

- Columba Bush (b. 1953) – wife of Jeb Bush and former First Lady of Florida
- Chucho Castillo (1944–2013) – professional boxer
- Daniel Escoto – stock car racer
- Virginia Galván de Nava (1873–195?) – soprano and voice teacher
- María Grever (1885–1951) – composer
- Lucía Méndez (b. 1955) – entertainer
- Rafael Villagómez (b. 2001) – Formula 2 driver
- Vicente B. Zacarías (1978/79–2016) – federal judge; assassinated
- Felipe Zetter (1923–2013) – professional footballer; represented Mexico internationally
- Black Shadow (wrestler) - professional wrestler; Lucha libre icon

== Twin towns – sister cities ==
León is twinned with:

- Bogotá, Colombia
- Cangas de Onís, Spain
- Havana, Cuba
- Irving, United States
- Laredo, United States
- Las Vegas, United States
- León, Nicaragua
- León, Spain
- Novo Hamburgo, Brazil
- San Diego, United States
- Suzhou, China
- Fermo, Italy

== See also ==
- Bajío
