= Ildefonso Zamora =

Mexican environmental activist (1961–2020)

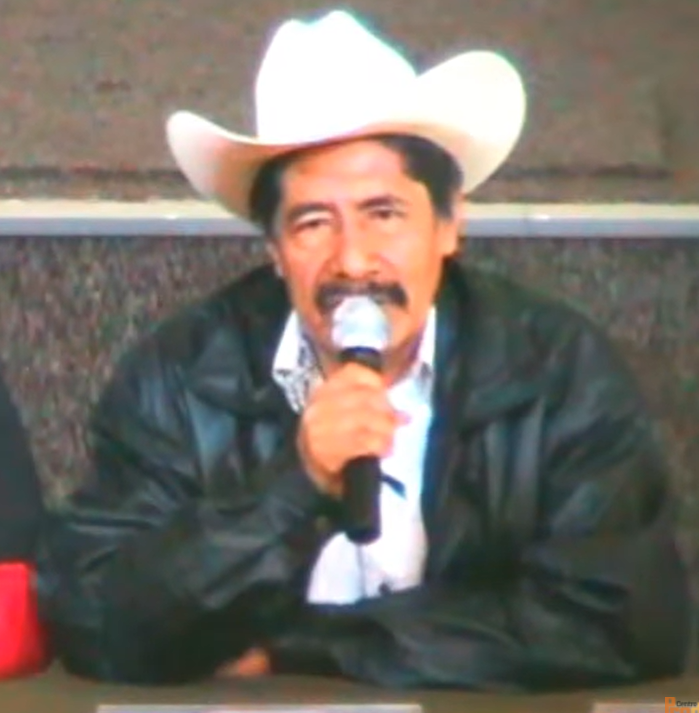
- Zamora speaking in 2016
- Born: 23 January 1961; San Juan Atzingo, State of Mexico, Mexico
- Died: 5 July 2020 (aged 59); San Juan Atzingo, State of Mexico, Mexico
- Occupation: Environmental activist
- Years active: 1998–2020

Ildefonso Zamora Baldomero (23 January 1961 – 5 July 2020) was a Mexican human rights activist. He was known for his defence of the ancestral lands and forests of the Matlatzinca people from logging, for which he was arrested and imprisoned.

== Personal life ==
Zamora was born on 23 January 1961 in San Juan Atzingo, Ocuilan, State of Mexico, and grew up at the foot of Zempoala, in a Matlatzinca family. As an adult, he was an active member of Ocuilan civil society, including serving as the president of the municipality's parents association, and as a steward, commander, and municipal delegate. Between 2000 and 2011, Zamora was the president of the communal land of San Juan Atzingo; in 2015 he was elected as the Ocuilan councillor for tourism and the environment.

On 5 July 2020, Zamora died at his home in San Juan Atzingo of kidney disease, which he had developed a few months earlier. His death was announced by his son Misael on Facebook, who described him as "El Inalcanzable Defensor De Los Bosques" (lit. 'The Unreachable Defender of the Forests').

== Activism ==
Zamora was a defender of the Lagunas de Zempoala National Park, a mountain and forest that provides three-quarters of Mexico City's water supply. Increasing human habitation on the mountain's slopes led to high rates of logging; in 1998, Zamora filed his first criminal complaint about the impact of illegal logging on the local area. Zamora went on to file numerous further complaints in which he denounced corruption within local authorities, and detailed his attempts to protect species native to the forest. Zamora's sons, Aldo and Misael, joined their father in his activism; the three became activists for Greenpeace Mexico, and carried out a public campaign against illegal logging by displaying a large "SOS" on the mountainside. On 15 May 2007, Aldo was killed during an ambush by loggers in Santa Lucía, Ocuilan; Misael was injured and subsequently arrested and tried on charges of illegal logging, for which he pleaded not guilty. Two of Aldo's killers, Fernando Jacinto Medina and Silvestre Jacinto Medina, were arrested in Ocuilan on 1 August 2007; two other assailants, Luis Encarnación and Alejo Encarnación, remained at large.

On 20 November 2015, Zamora was arrested and charged with burglary of a home in San Juan Atzingo in 2012. During his detention, he was beaten by agents from the Attorney General's Office. Zamora was detained in a prison in Tenancingo for nine months, during which time his health significantly declined. He was subsequently released due to a lack of evidence on 12 August 2016. The arrest was condemned by human rights organisations such as the Observatory for the Protection of Human Rights Defenders, Greenpeace and Amnesty International as being arbitrary and in retaliation for his environmental activism.

== Recognition ==
In 2007, the federal government of Mexico awarded the people of San Juan Atzingo an ecological merit prize in recognition of their sustainable management of the forest, as well as their campaigns carried out in defence of the forest.

Following Zamora's death, several human rights organisations released statements on his life and activism, including the Mexican office of the United Nations High Commissioner for Human Rights, Greenpeace, and Amnesty International. Luis Tapia Olivares from the Centro de Derechos Humanos Miguel Agustín Pro Juárez praised Zamora as a "defender of the forests", and stated that his impact could only be measured in "millions of trees".
