= List of Wagga Wagga suburbs and localities =

Below is list of suburbs in Wagga Wagga, New South Wales.

== Suburbs ==
- Ashmont
- Bomen
- Boorooma
- Bourkelands
- Cartwrights Hill
- East Wagga Wagga
- Estella
- Forest Hill
- Glenfield Park
- Gobbagombalin
- Gumly Gumly
- Kapooka
- Kooringal
- Lake Albert
- Lloyd
- Mount Austin
- North Wagga Wagga
- San Isidore
- Springvale
- Tatton
- Tolland
- Turvey Park
- Wagga Wagga

Below is list of localities within the city boundaries of Wagga Wagga, New South Wales.

== Localities ==
- Alfredtown
- Book Book
- Collingullie
- Downside
- Euberta
- Gregadoo
- Ladysmith
- Mangoplah
- Oura
- Rowan
- Tarcutta
- Uranquinty

Information about locality boundaries has been sourced from the UBD New South Wales Country Road Atlas (16th edition, 2006) and City of Wagga Wagga website.
