= Kooringal High School =

Location
- Kooringal, New South Wales; Australia; 35°08′35″S 147°22′52″E

Information
- Type: Government-funded co-educational dual modality partially academically selective and comprehensive secondary day school
- Motto: The Edge in Education
- Established: 1973; 53 years ago
- School district: Wagga Wagga; Rural South and West region
- Educational authority: New South Wales Department of Education
- Principal: Helen Schmetzer
- Teaching staff: 68.8 FTE (2018)
- Years: 7–12
- Enrolment: 861 (2018)
- Colours: Navy blue, gold, and tan
- Slogan: Preserve, Conserve, Serve
- Newspaper: The Ziegler
- Website: kooringal-h.schools.nsw.gov.au

Kooringal High School (abbreviated as KHS) is a government-funded co-educational dual modality partially academically selective and comprehensive secondary day school, located in Kooringal, a suburb of Wagga Wagga in the Riverina region of New South Wales, Australia.

Established in 1973, the school enrolled approximately 860 students in 2018, from Year 7 to Year 12, of whom nine percent identified as Indigenous Australians and six percent were from a language background other than English. The school is operated by the NSW Department of Education; the principal is Helen Schmetzer.

== Overview ==
Kooringal High opened in 1973 with 354 students in years seven and eight, 18 teachers, one office worker and eight cleaners. It was the third government high school established in the city of Wagga Wagga. Kooringal High School's local enrolment area includes the residential areas of Kooringal and Lake Albert and more recently Tatton and sections of Springvale.

== Selective stream ==
Kooringal High School's Selective Stream commenced operation with its first year 7 intake in 2010. The commencement of the school's selective stream was thanks to the NSW Government's decision to increase selective placements, and Kooringal High School was set to offer thirty places per year to students who had sat and passed the State Secondary Schools Selective Test. One of the school's claims to fame is that it is the only selective school in the Riverina region, with the nearest selective school being Yanco Agricultural High School. In 2015, selective students accounted for approximately 20% of the school's total enrolment.

All prospective Selective Students sit the State Secondary Schools Selective Test and are assigned a profile score out of 300, and this score is used to determine which selective school they can acquire a place at. From that process, each school has a minimum entry score that is based on the score held by the last student to accept a place from the reserve list for the previous year's placement. In 2018, the School's Minimum Entry Score was 161, the lowest entry score that year, and a title shared by six other selective schools in NSW.

Minimum selective high school entry scores
School	2015	2016	2017	2018
Kooringal High School	161	163	160	161

== Facilities ==
=== Technological ===
Kooringal High School features six computer rooms for student use, four of which are fitted out with HP Prodesk 600 G2 desktop computers. Each computer room has on average 25 desktops that run Windows 10 for Education. 17 Interactive Whiteboards have been installed in Key Learning Areas to aid in classroom learning, and a school-wide wireless network is accessible in each classroom and learning space. The Kooringal High School Library also has several banks of laptops that are loaned out to classes for student learning. The school was also one of 200 in NSW to receive a full video conferencing facility, which is now located in the top level of the school library, colloquially known as the VC (Video Conferencing) Room.

=== Sporting ===
The school has two sporting ovals, one on the north side of the school, and another on the south eastern side. Two new multi-purpose netball/basketball courts are located on the top oval, and an older (now mostly disused) basketball court sits alongside them. The school's indoor gymnasium commonly doubles as a basketball/volleyball/tennis court, and also plays host to school assemblies, held each fortnight. In the gym it also has a workout room

== Notable alumni ==
- Sam Moran – entertainer, The Wiggles
- Michael Nixon – Former KHS student; young entrepreneur and founder of EduKits International
- Peter Sterling OAM – rugby league football player
- Rachel Trenaman – Australian cricketer; played with the New South Wales Breakers
- Adam Schneider – Australian Rules Footballer (Sydney Swans/St Kilda Saints)
- Michelle Brasier – vocalist, actor and comedian
- Jake Scott – Australian cricketer

== See also ==
- List of government schools in New South Wales: G–P
- List of selective high schools in New South Wales
- Selective school (New South Wales)
- Education in Australia
