= Bourkelands, New South Wales =

Bourkelands Wagga Wagga, New South Wales
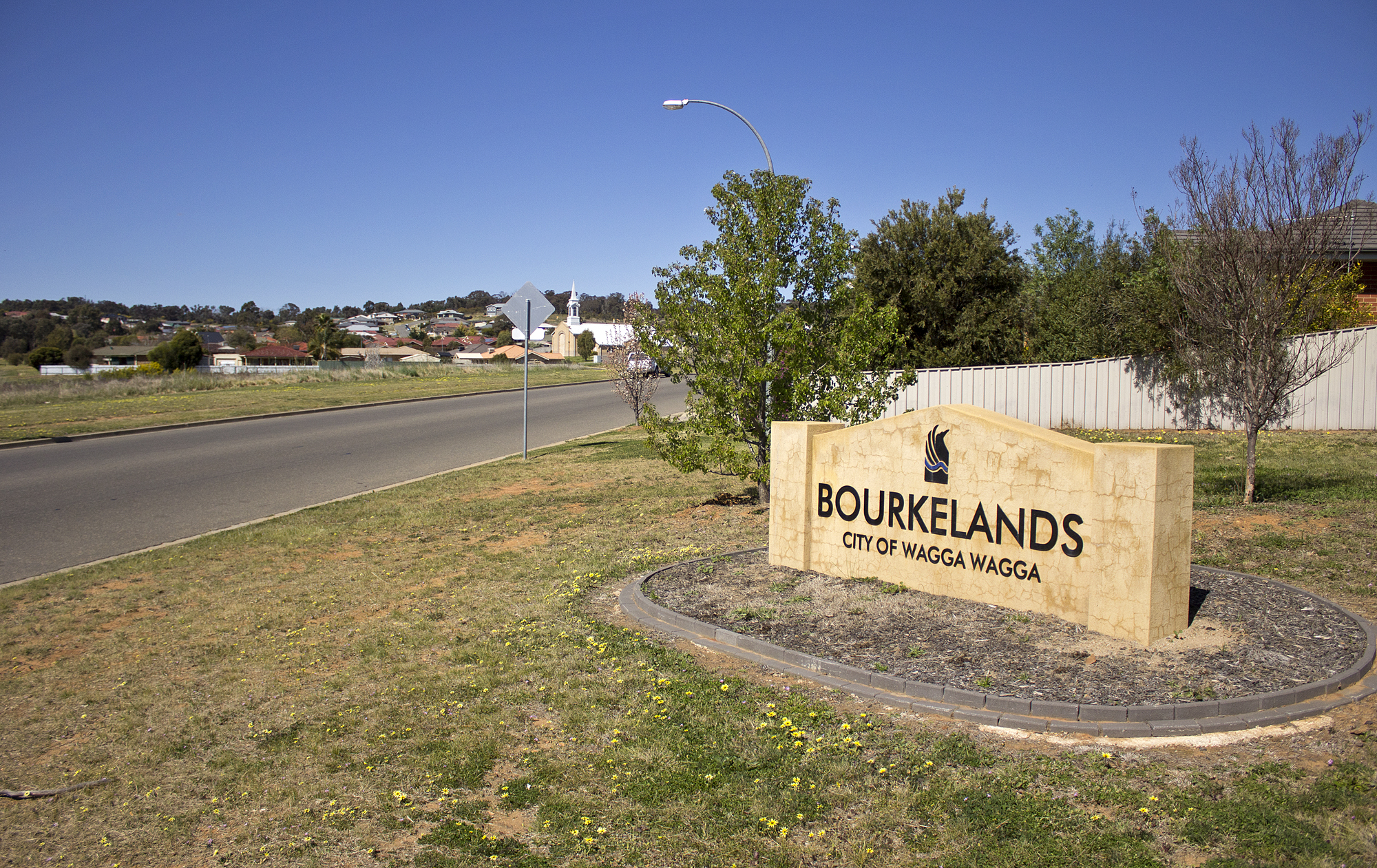
- Bourkelands viewed from Bourkelands Drive.

- Coordinates: 35°9′14.86″S 147°21′3.88″E
- Population: 2,852 (2016 census)
- Postcode(s): 2650
- LGA(s): City of Wagga Wagga
- County: Wynyard
- Parish: South Wagga Wagga
- State electorate(s): Wagga Wagga
- Federal division(s): Riverina
Suburbs around Bourkelands:
Glenfield Park	Tolland	Kooringal
Lloyd	Bourkelands	Tatton
Springvale	Springvale	Lake Albert

Bourkelands is a rapidly developing southern suburb of Wagga Wagga in southern New South Wales, Australia which is named after a property which was located within the suburb. The suburb consists predominantly of real estate display homes and housing for military staff at the nearby RAAF Base Wagga and Army Recruit Training Centre. The suburb borders Red Hill Road and is within walking distance of the Tolland shopping centre and Jubilee Park/Oval and contains two play parks. The suburb also contains the area which is commonly marketed by real estate agents and developers as Hilltop, as the name Hilltop is not registered locality.

A large LDS Church was constructed in the suburb in 2005.

Bourkelands was built in 1943 16th of October was when the building was completed. Streets in Bourkelands are named after 'Important pastoral homesteads of the region'.
