= Wagga Wagga War Cemetery =

Cemetery in New South Wales, Australia

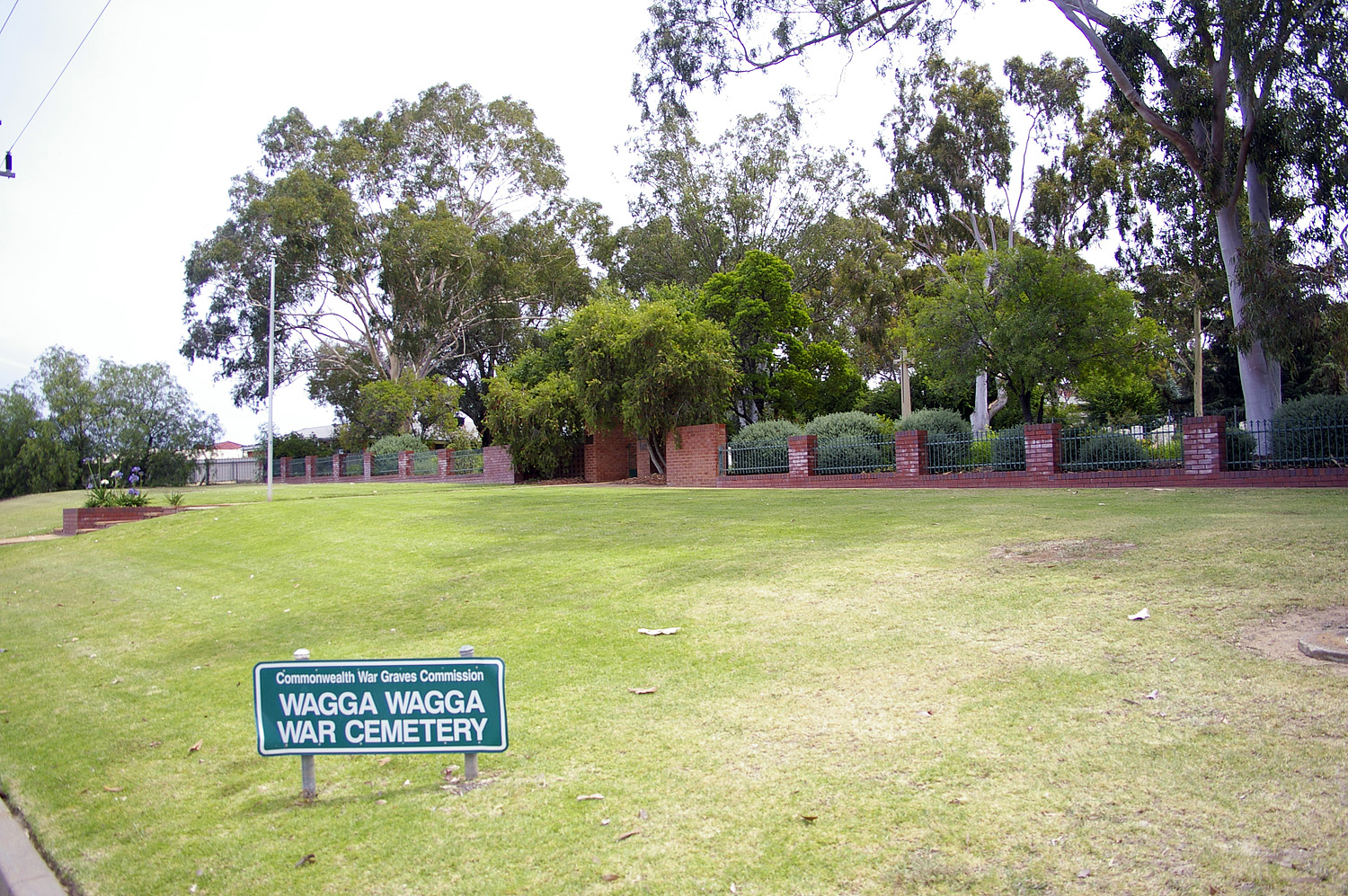
- Wagga Wagga War Cemetery viewed from Kooringal Road
- Interactive map of Wagga Wagga War Cemetery

Details
- Location: Wagga Wagga, New South Wales
- Country: Australia
- Coordinates: 35°08′13″S 147°23′18″E
- Type: Public
- Owned by: Commonwealth War Graves Commission
- No. of graves: 83
- Find a Grave: Wagga Wagga War Cemetery

Wagga Wagga War Cemetery is a war cemetery that occupies a plot in the Wagga Wagga Monumental Cemetery located in the Wagga Wagga suburb of Kooringal, Australia. It is in the care of the Commonwealth War Graves Commission and is maintained by the Office of Australian War Graves.

The cemetery contains 83 graves, 43 airmen and 40 soldiers, 26 of whom died on 21 May 1945 in Australia's largest training accident at the Royal Australian Engineers Training Camp located at the Kapooka Army Base which resulted in Australia's largest military funeral.

== Vandalism ==
Nineteen headstones at the Wagga Wagga War Cemetery were desecrated by vandals in November 2008. On 1 April 2009 the nineteen headstones were restored at a cost of A$7,500 with A$10,000 reward on offer for information leading to the conviction of those responsible for the attack.
