= Downside, New South Wales =

Downside New South Wales
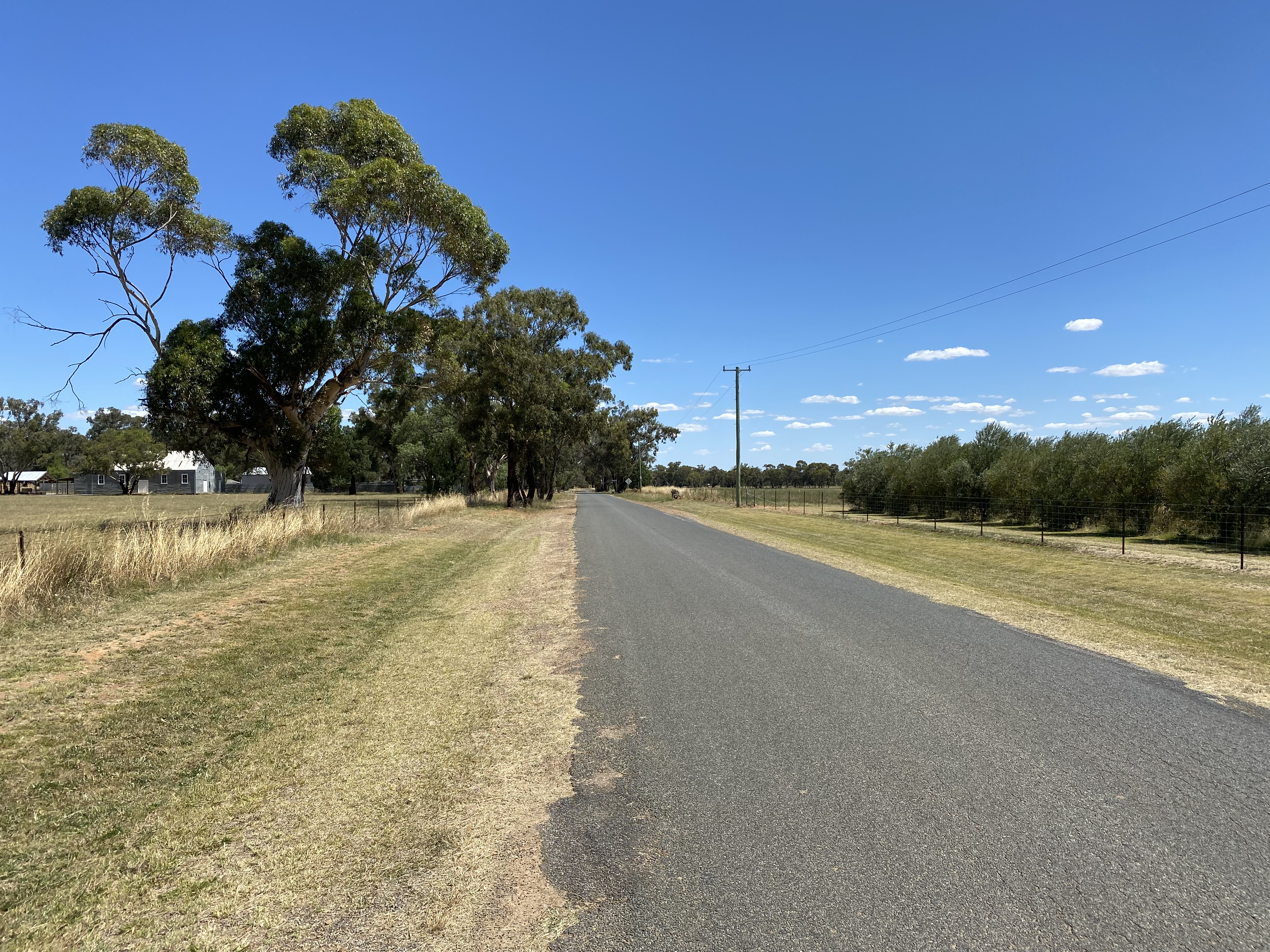
- Downside Village Road in Downside

- Coordinates: 34°58′35″S 147°20′39″E
- Population: 124 (2016 census)
- Postcode(s): 2650
- Elevation: 279 m (915 ft)
- Location: 15 km (9 mi) from Wagga Wagga; 24 km (15 mi) from Coolamon
- LGA(s): City of Wagga Wagga
- County: Clarendon
- State electorate(s): Wagga Wagga

Downside is a farming community in the central east part of the Riverina and situated about 15 kilometres north west from Wagga Wagga and 24 kilometres south east from Coolamon.

Downside Post Office opened on 15 August 1878 and closed in 1905.

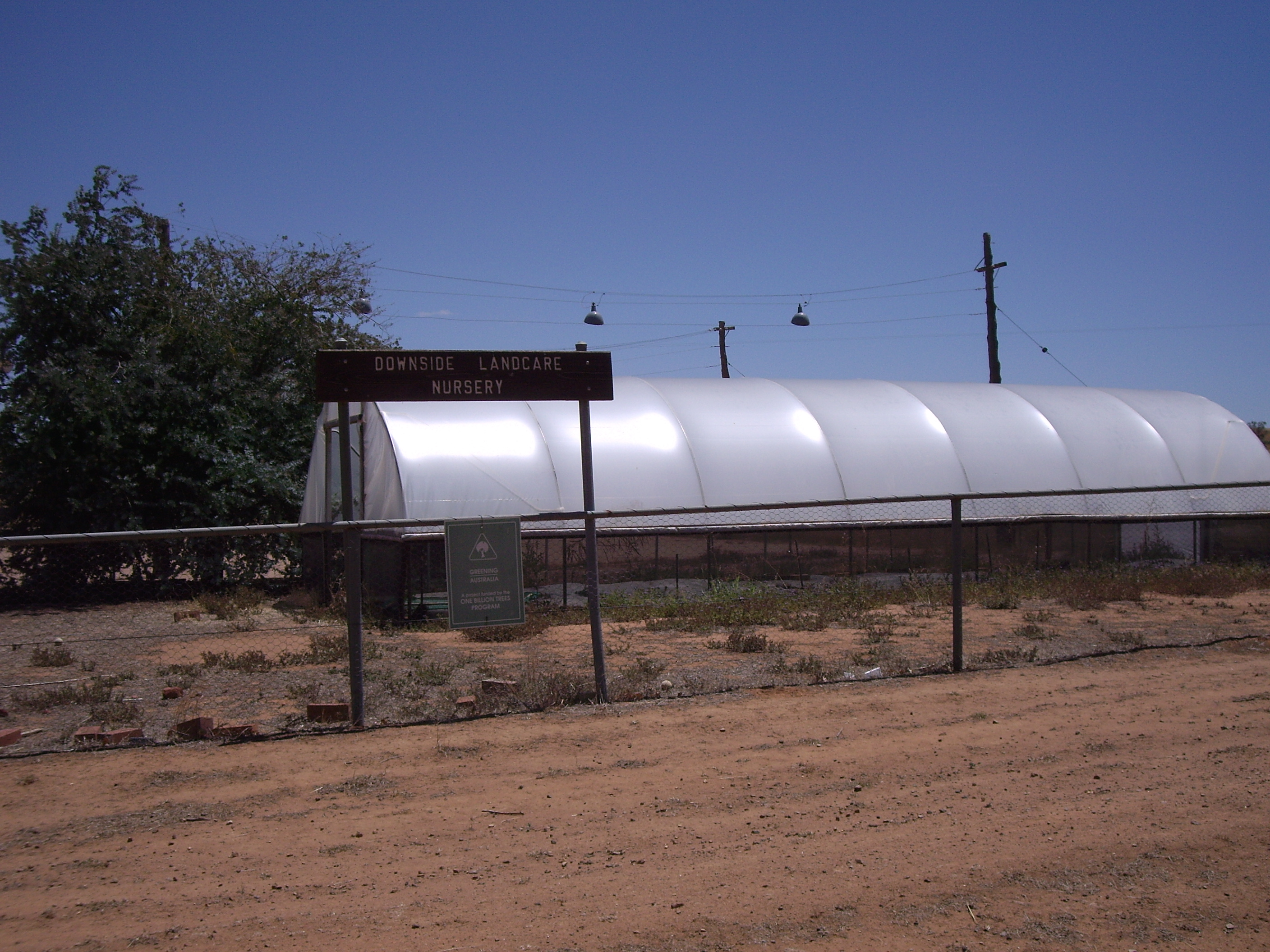
Downside Landcare Nursery
