= East Wagga Wagga =

Coordinates: 35°07′16.32″S 147°23′7.68″E

East Wagga Wagga Wagga Wagga, New South Wales
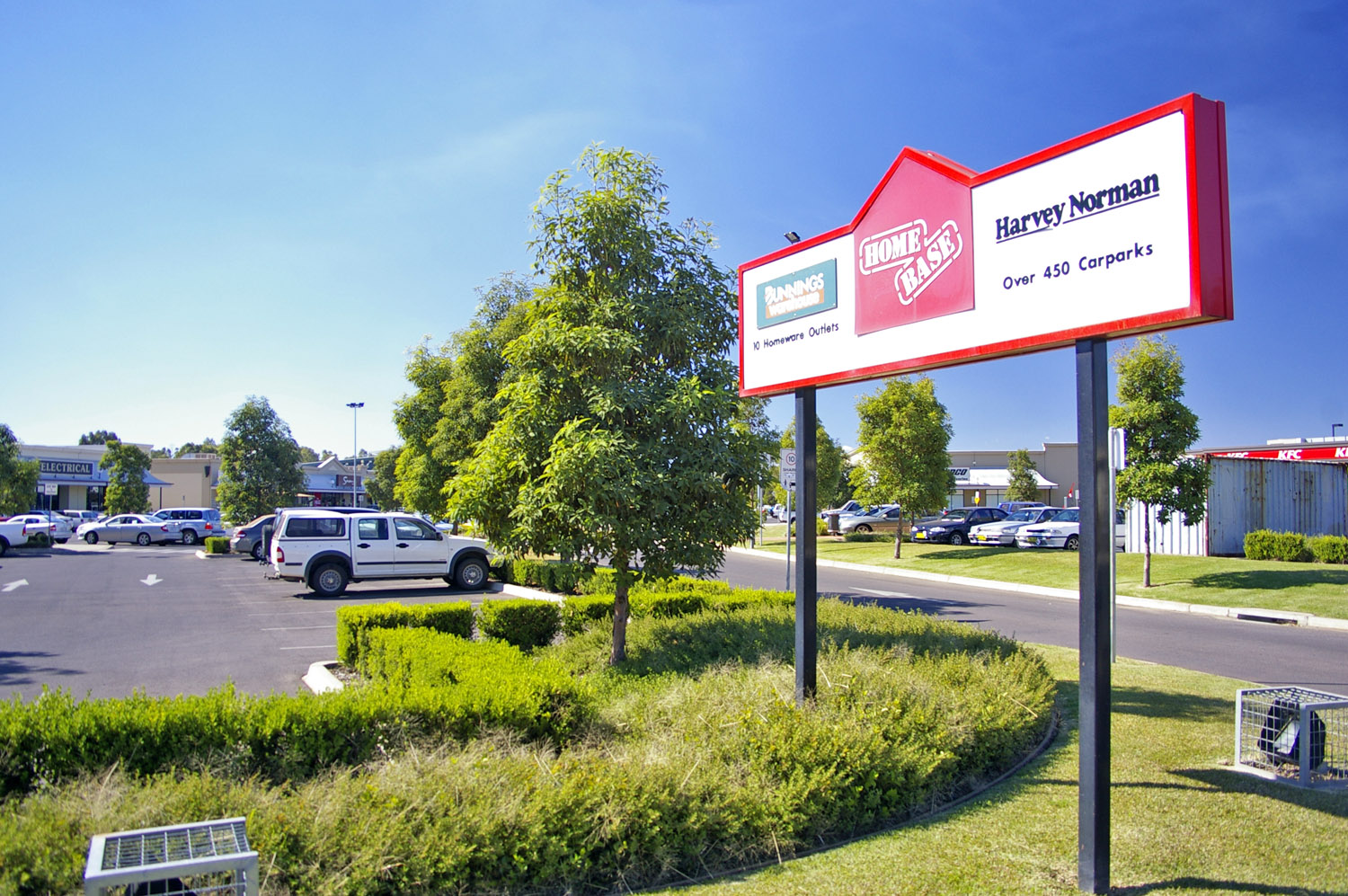
- Home Base Wagga Wagga, a bulky goods site located in East Wagga
- Population: 237 (2016 census)
- Postcode(s): 2650
- LGA(s): City of Wagga Wagga
- County: Wynyard
- Parish: South Wagga Wagga
- State electorate(s): Wagga Wagga
- Federal division(s): Riverina
Suburbs around East Wagga Wagga:
| Wagga Wagga | North Wagga Wagga | North Wagga Wagga |
| Wagga Wagga | East Wagga Wagga | Gumly Gumly |
| Kooringal | Kooringal | Lake Albert |

East Wagga Wagga is a suburb of Wagga Wagga, New South Wales. East Wagga Wagga is mostly an industrial area located approximately 3 km (2 mi) east south-east of the central business district on the Sturt Highway. Home Base Wagga Wagga, WIN Television, Country Energy depot, Riverina Water County Council headquarters, Australia Post Mail Sorting Centre, Busabout Wagga Wagga depot, Australian Clay Target Association (ACTA) National Office and ACTA shooting range are located within East Wagga Wagga.
