= Tolland, New South Wales =

Tolland
- Suburb
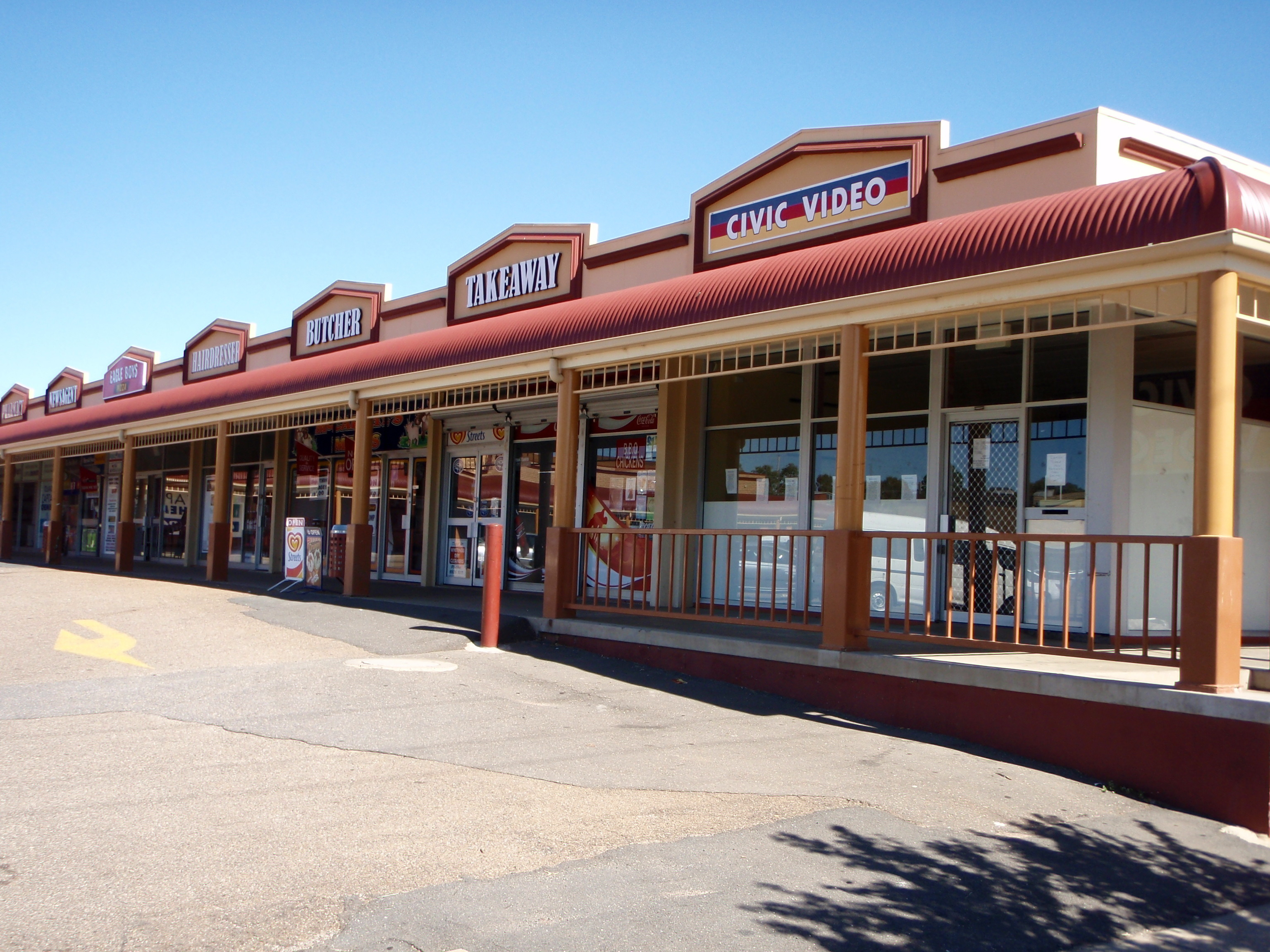
- Tolland Shopping Centre

- Interactive map of Tolland
- Coordinates: 35°8′42.46″S 147°21′7.48″E
- Country: Australia
- State: New South Wales
- City: Wagga Wagga
- LGA: City of Wagga Wagga

Government
  - State electorate: Wagga Wagga
  - Federal division: Riverina

Population
  - Total: 3,357 (2016 census)
- Postcode: 2650
- County: Wynyard
- Parish: South Wagga Wagga
Suburbs around Tolland
Glenfield Park	Mount Austin	Kooringal
Glenfield Park	Tolland	Kooringal
Lloyd	Bourkelands	Tatton

Tolland is a suburb located in the city of Wagga Wagga in the Riverina region of New South Wales, Australia. The suburb is home to Mount Austin High School and Tolland Shopping Centre which has an IGA supermarket and a Domino's Pizza outlet.

It was also home to the South Wagga / Tolland Football Club that played in the Farrer Football League from 1982 to 1997. The club disbanded in 1998.
