= Lloyd, New South Wales =

Lloyd Wagga Wagga, New South Wales
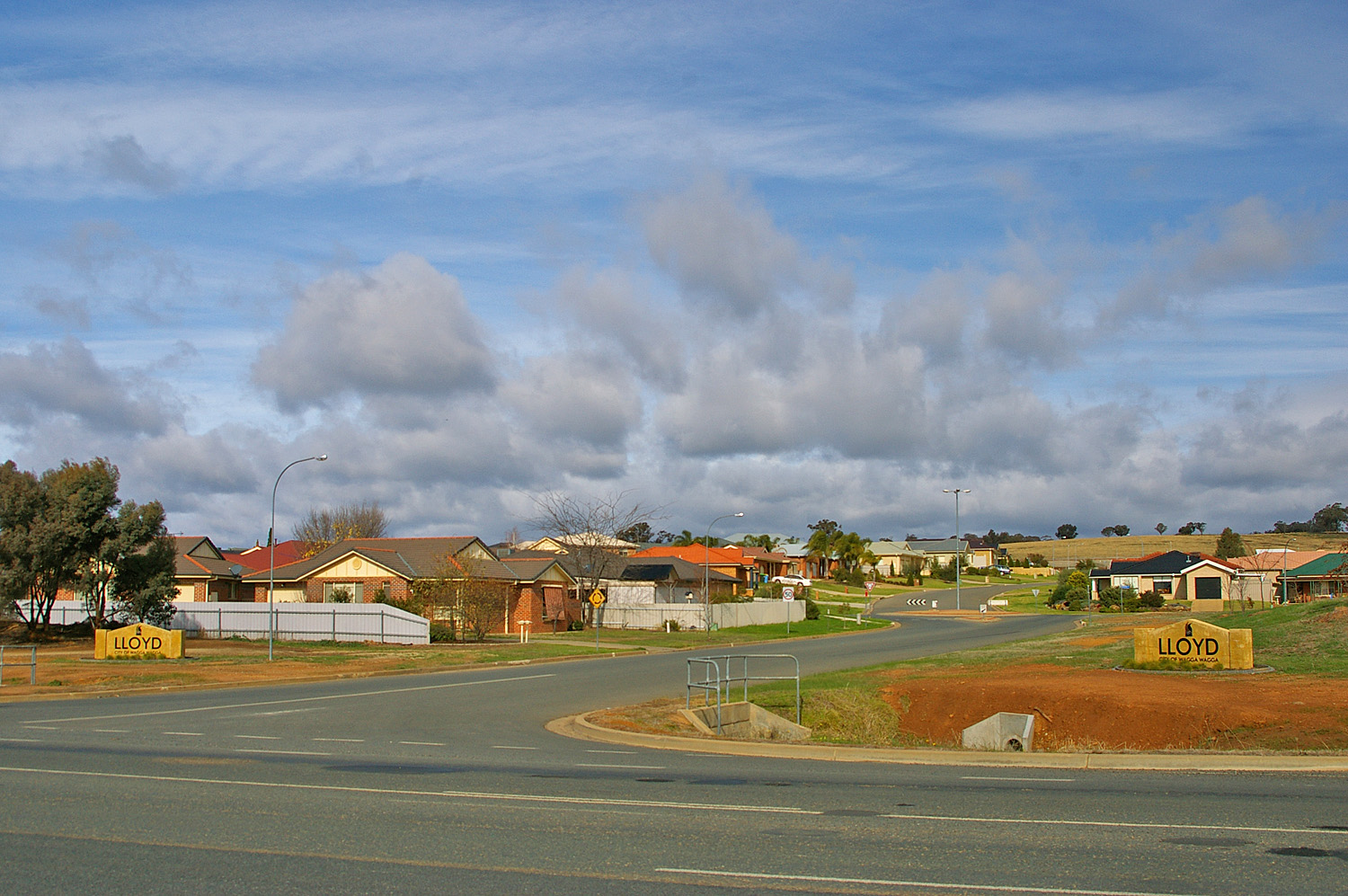
- Suburb of Lloyd

- Coordinates: 35°8′42.46″S 147°21′7.48″E
- Population: 1,509 (SAL 2021)
- Postcode(s): 2650
- LGA(s): City of Wagga Wagga
- County: Wynyard
- Parish: South Wagga Wagga
- State electorate(s): Wagga Wagga
- Federal division(s): Riverina
Suburbs around Lloyd:
Glenfield Park	Glenfield Park	Tolland
Kapooka	Lloyd	Bourkelands
Kapooka	Springvale	Bourkelands

Lloyd is a suburb of Wagga Wagga, New South Wales, Australia. It is located to the south-west of the city, to the west of Jubilee Park and Holbrook (Mangoplah) Road, and to the south of Red Hill Road. Development of the suburb commenced in the late 1990s and to date there are only residential dwellings present within its confines.
