= Springvale, New South Wales =

Springvale Wagga Wagga, New South Wales
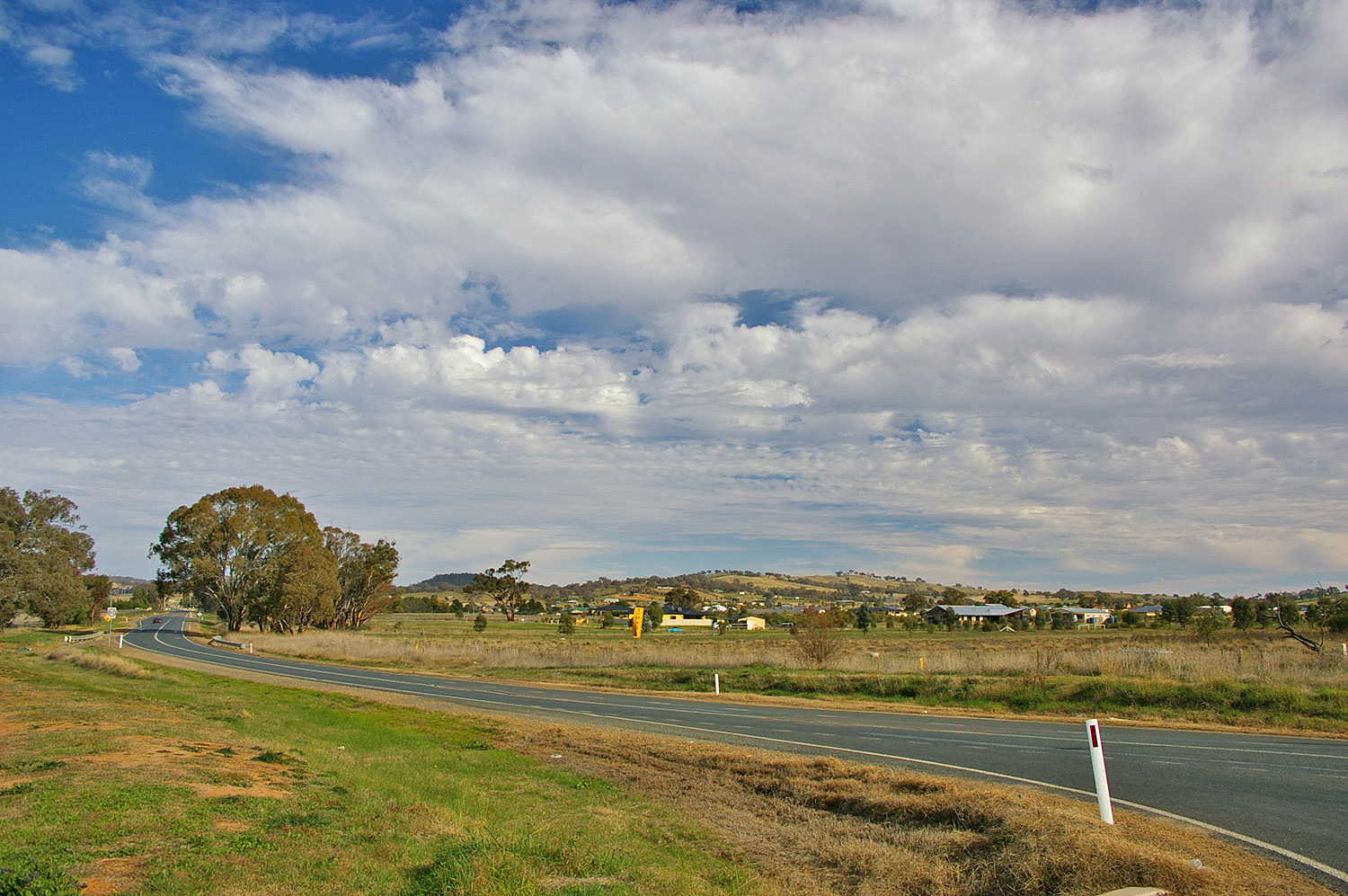
- Holbrook Road at Springvale.

- Coordinates: 35°10′7.02″S 147°20′3.33″E
- Population: 1,733 (2016 census)
- Postcode(s): 2650
- LGA(s): City of Wagga Wagga
- County: Wynyard
- Parish: Rowan
- State electorate(s): Wagga Wagga
- Federal division(s): Riverina
Suburbs around Springvale:
Lloyd	Bourkelands	Tatton
	Springvale	Lake Albert
	Rowan	Gregadoo

Springvale is an outer southern suburb of Wagga Wagga, New South Wales, Australia. Springvale is located to the south of Bourkelands, and to the West of Lake Albert on the Holbrook Road.
