= Yvonne Braid =

Australian politician (1942–2025)

Yvonne Braid OAM
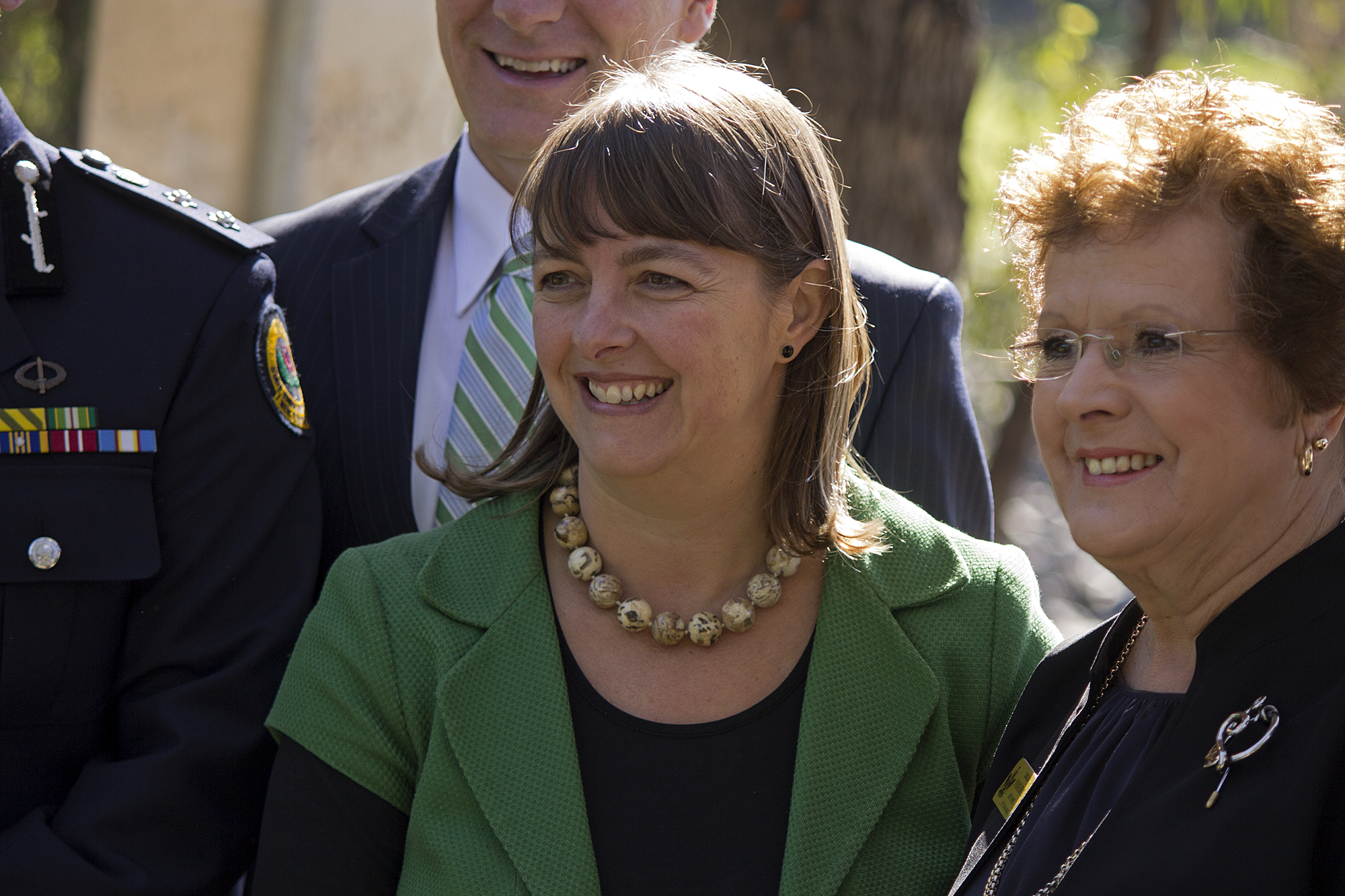
- Braid in 2012

Deputy Mayor of the City of Wagga Wagga
- In office 2012

Councillor on Wagga Wagga City Council
- In office 2008–2021

Personal details
- Born: Yvonne Southwell; 29 November 1942
- Died: 5 July 2025 (aged 82) Tumut, New South Wales, Australia
- Education: Wagga Wagga Technical College

Yvonne Braid OAM (née Southwell; 29 November 1942 – 5 July 2025) was an Australian politician, community leader and radio station manager.

== Early life ==
Braid was born in 1942 to Araluen and Owen Southwell.

She was educated at Mount Erin and later Wagga Wagga Technical College where she completed a secretarial course.

== Life and career ==
She started work at the 2WG radio station in Wagga Wagga as a receptionist in 1958 and worked her way up to the role of general manager.

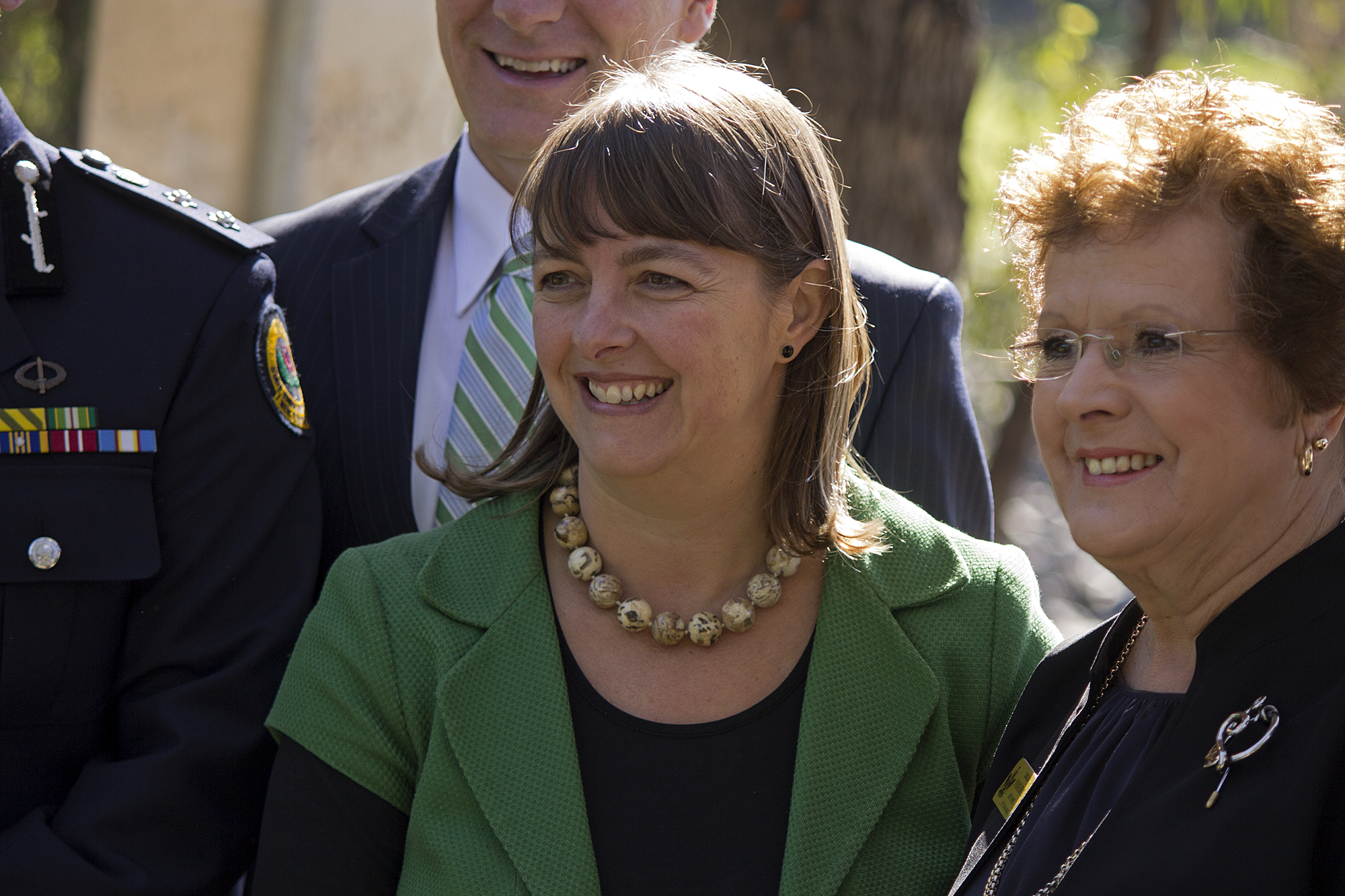
Braid (right), Deputy mayor of Wagga Wagga, with Nicola Roxon, attorney-general of Australia

Braid served as a Wagga Wagga City Councillor from 2008 to 2021, and as deputy Mayor in 2012.

Braid was active in many local charities, including serving as a member of the Board of The Haven Residential Aged Care in Wagga for more than 40 years from 1967 to 2013.

Braid died in Tumut at the Uniting Tumut aged care residential facility on 5 July 2025, at the age of 82.

== Awards ==
- 2017 - Order of Australia (OAM) Medal for service to local government, and to the community of Wagga Wagga.
