= Tatton, New South Wales =

Tatton Wagga Wagga, New South Wales
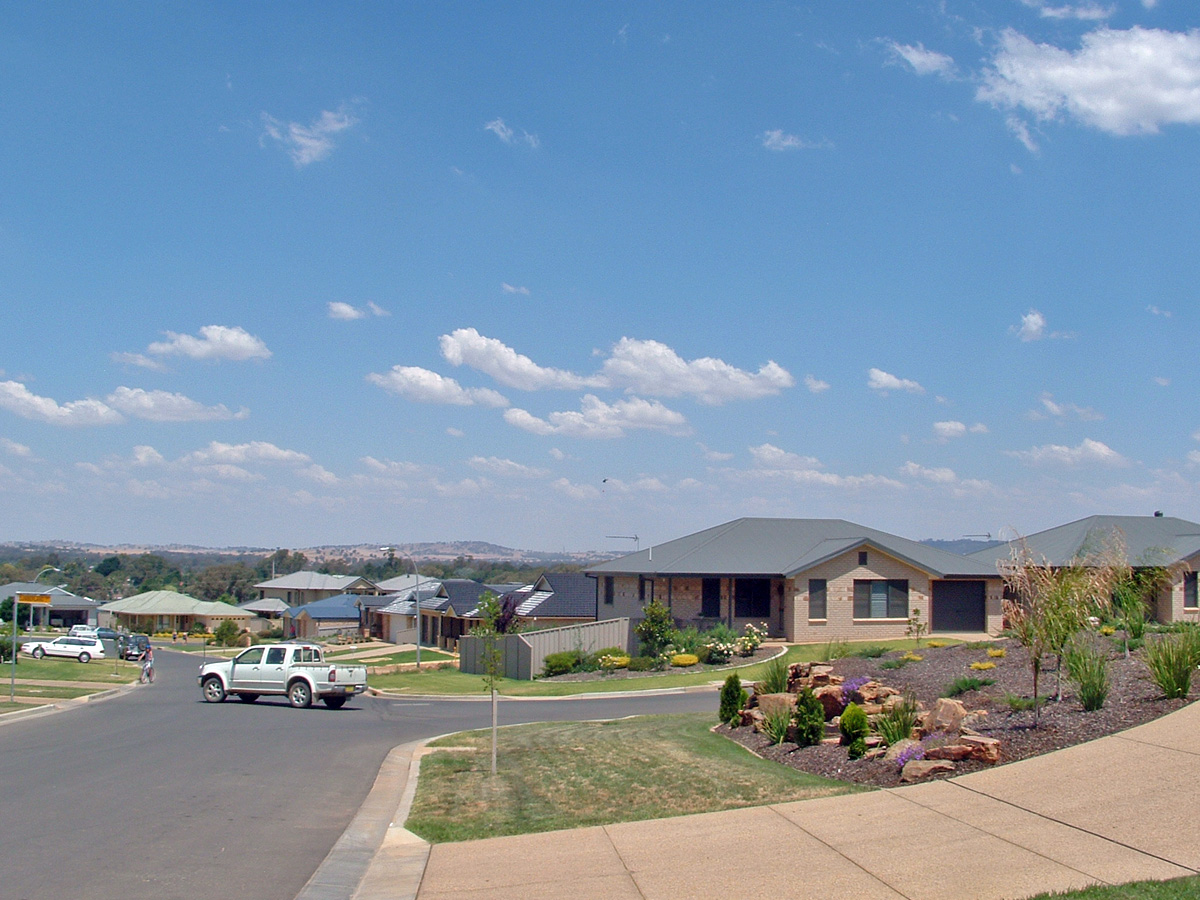
- Tamar Drive in Tatton

- Coordinates: 35°9′26″S 147°21′44″E
- Population: 2,560 (SAL 2021)
- Postcode(s): 2650
- LGA(s): City of Wagga Wagga
- County: Wynyard
- Parish: South Wagga Wagga
- State electorate(s): Wagga Wagga
- Federal division(s): Riverina
Suburbs around Tatton:
Tolland	Tolland	Kooringal
Bourkelands	Tatton	Lake Albert
Springvale	Gregadoo	Lake Albert

Tatton is an outer south-eastern suburb of Wagga Wagga, New South Wales, Australia. To the south of Kooringal and to the west of Lake Albert, Tatton is one of Wagga Wagga's more expensive new suburbs. Subdivision of what was an area dominated by small rural holdings, commenced in the 1990s. Tatton Public School was previously located within the confines of the suburb, however this school closed down prior to the commencement of any significant development. Today the suburb is serviced by the private Lutheran Primary School.
