= Glenfield Park, New South Wales =

Glenfield Park Wagga Wagga, New South Wales
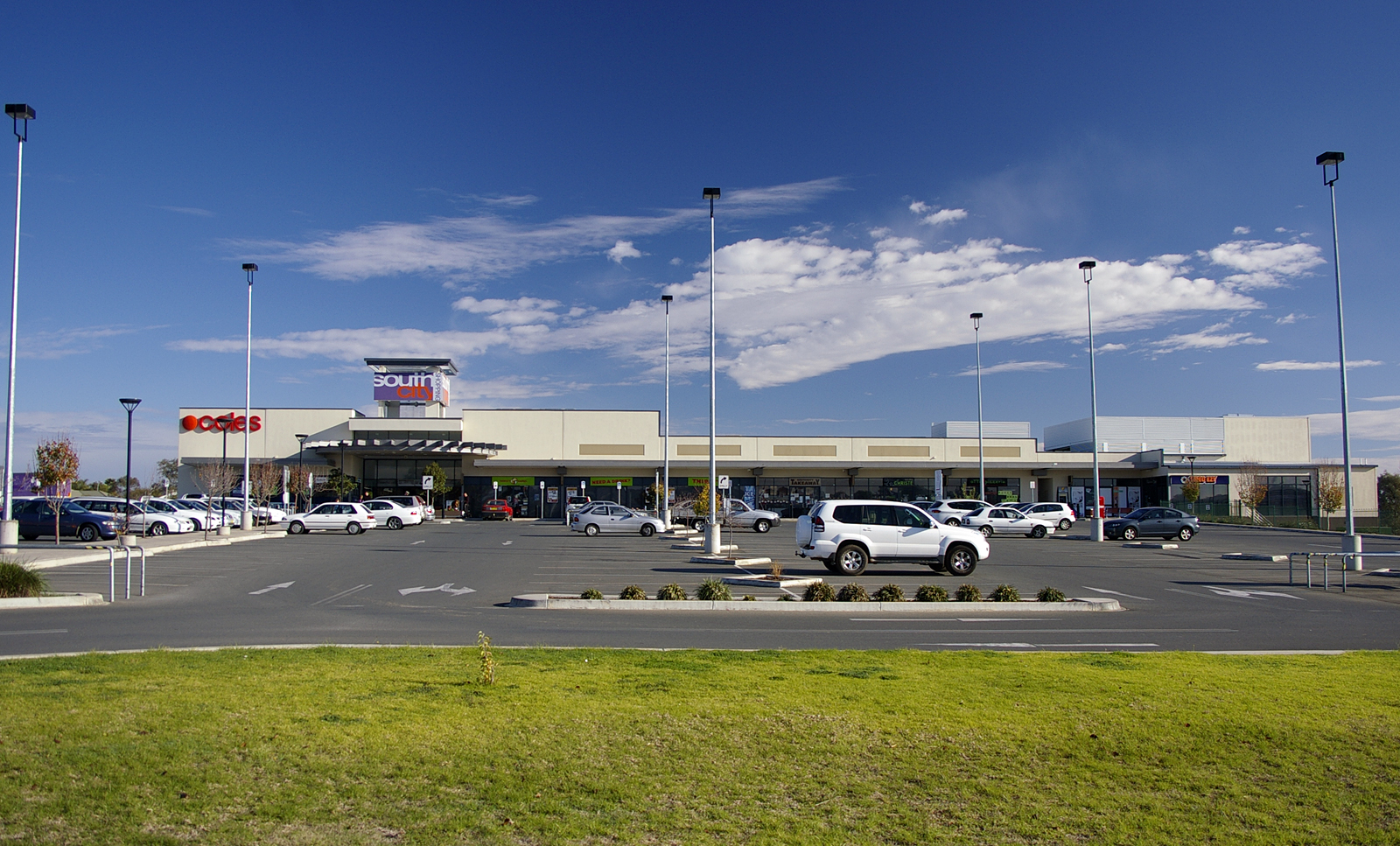
- South City Shopping Centre, Glenfield Park

- Coordinates: 35°8′10.06″S 147°19′55.48″E
- Population: 16,574 (2024 census)
- Postcode(s): 2650
- LGA(s): City of Wagga Wagga
- County: Wynyard
- Parish: South Wagga Wagga
- State electorate(s): Wagga Wagga
- Federal division(s): Riverina
Suburbs around Glenfield Park:
San Isidore	Ashmont	Turvey Park
	Glenfield Park	Mount Austin
Kapooka	Lloyd	Tolland

Glenfield Park, or simply 'Glenfield' is a rapidly growing southern suburb of Wagga Wagga, New South Wales, Australia reaching its final stages of development. Glenfield Park's strong residential development is due to its situation so close to the outskirts of the city and availability of relatively flat, cheap land. The suburb is home to the city's first Aldi supermarket and a large shopping centre known as South City Shopping Centre that is home to Wagga's second Coles supermarket.

Streets in Glenfield Park are named after Aboriginal words.
