= Mount Austin, New South Wales =

Mount Austin Wagga Wagga, New South Wales
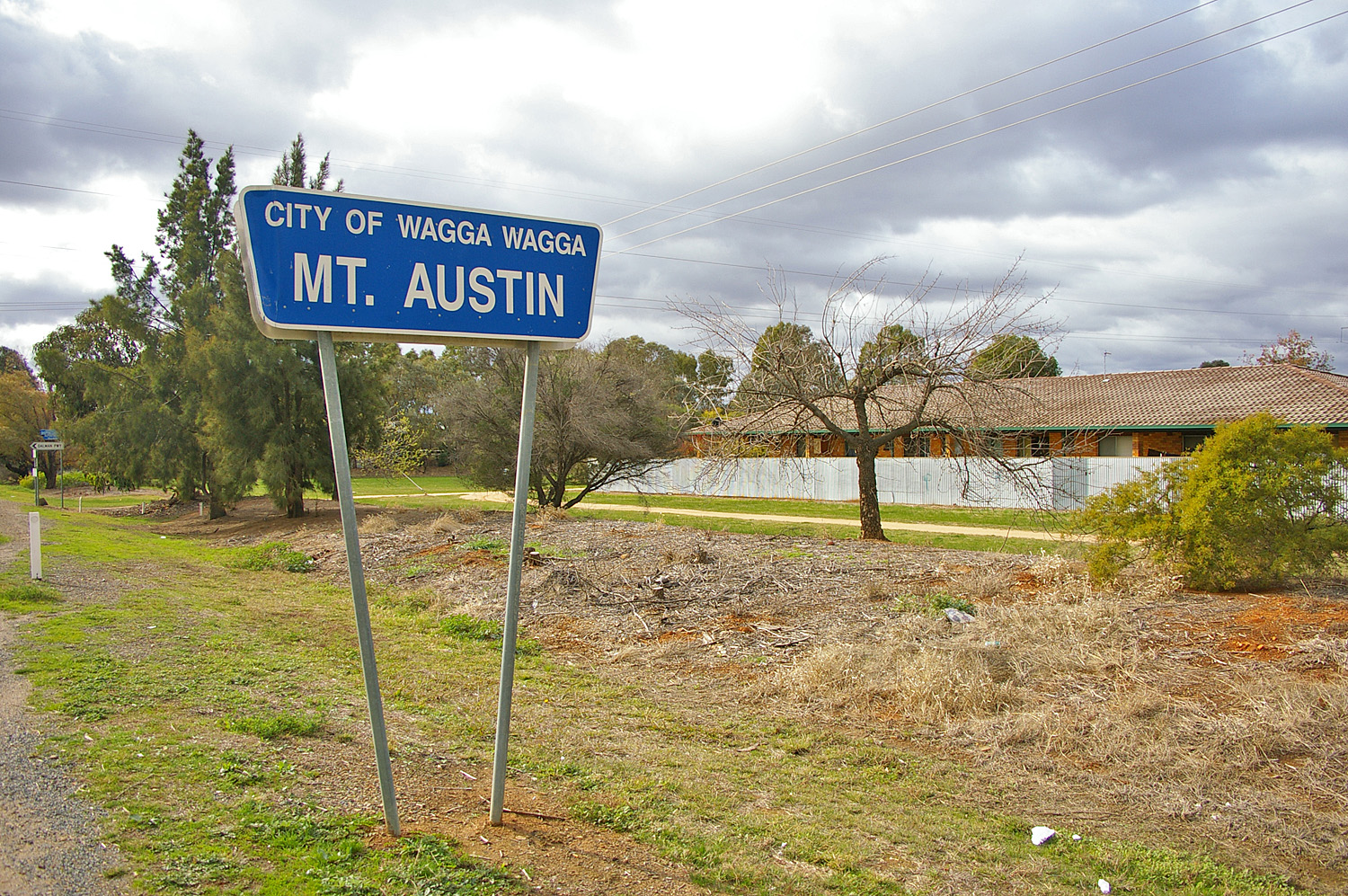
- Mount Austin suburb sign

- Coordinates: 35°8′10.06″S 147°21′7.48″E
- Population: 3,957 (2016 census)
- Postcode(s): 2650
- LGA(s): City of Wagga Wagga
- County: Wynyard
- Parish: South Wagga Wagga
- State electorate(s): Wagga Wagga
- Federal division(s): Riverina
Suburbs around Mount Austin:
Glenfield Park	Turvey Park	Kooringal
Glenfield Park	Mount Austin	Kooringal
Glenfield Park	Tolland	Kooringal

Mount Austin is an inner southern suburb of Wagga Wagga, New South Wales, Australia. Its boundaries are Fernleigh Road and Leavenworth Drive to the north and south respectively, whilst Glenfield Road and Willans Hill form the western and eastern extents.

The suburb is dominated by former and present Housing NSW residences.

Mount Austin Public School is located within the suburb however Mount Austin High School is situated in the neighbouring suburb of Tolland.

Despite its name, the Turvey Tops Shopping centre is located in Mount Austin, and not neighbouring Turvey Park. The shopping centre was first planned by the New South Wales Housing Commission in the 1950s, but it was not until the 1960s, when Great Southern Enterprises Pty Ltd took over ownership of the land that work on the shopping centre started. Turvey Tops opened 3 December 1963, with a crowd of 3000 people in attendance.

== Anderson Park ==
Anderson Park, in the suburb, was opened in 1987. It is named after the one-time Collingwood footballer, and long time local resident, George P. Anderson (1885-1957).

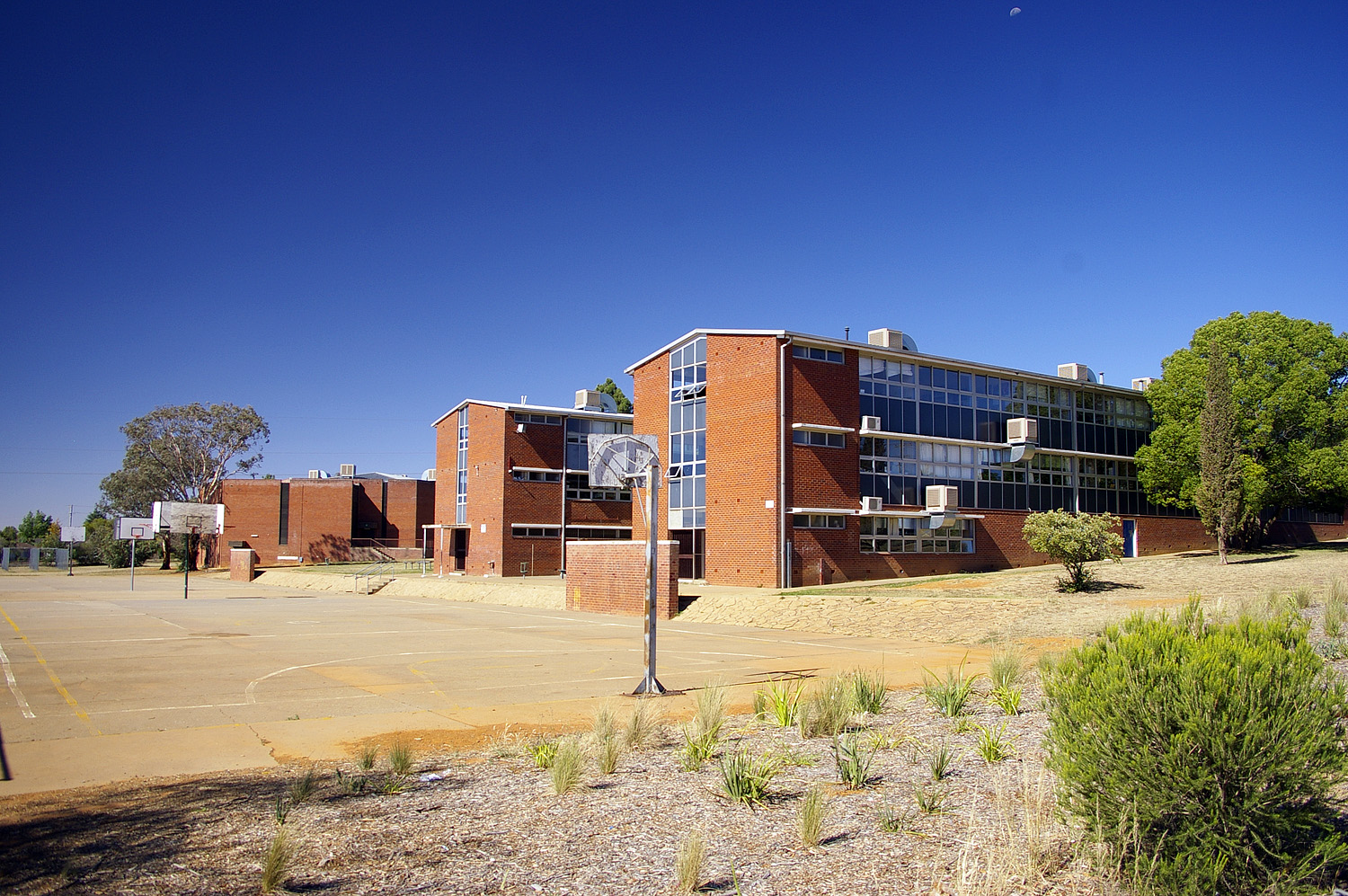
Mount Austin High School

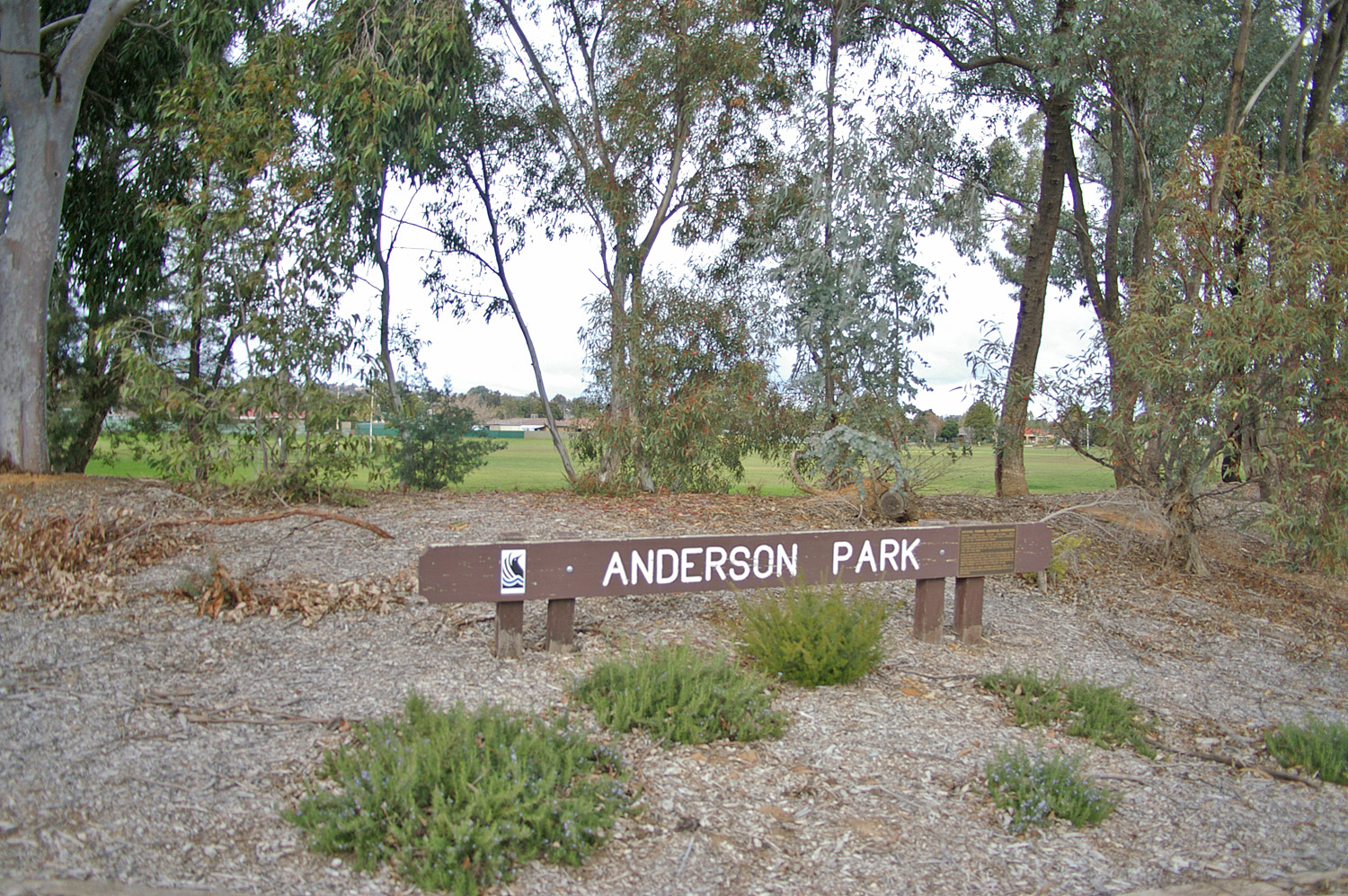
Anderson Park, Glenfield Road

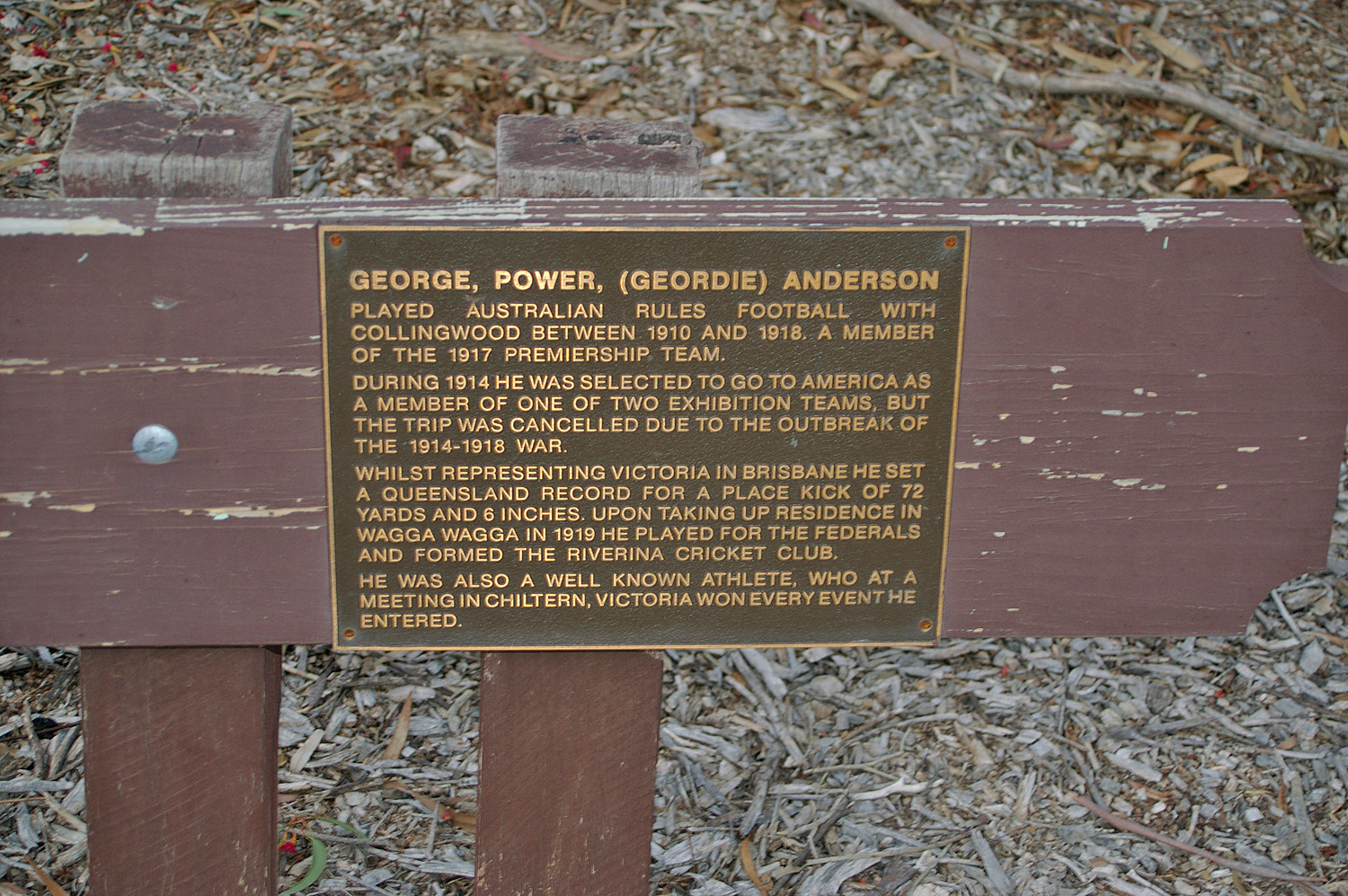
The Memorial Plaque at Anderson Park, Glenfield Road
