= Turvey Park, New South Wales =

Turvey Park Wagga Wagga, New South Wales
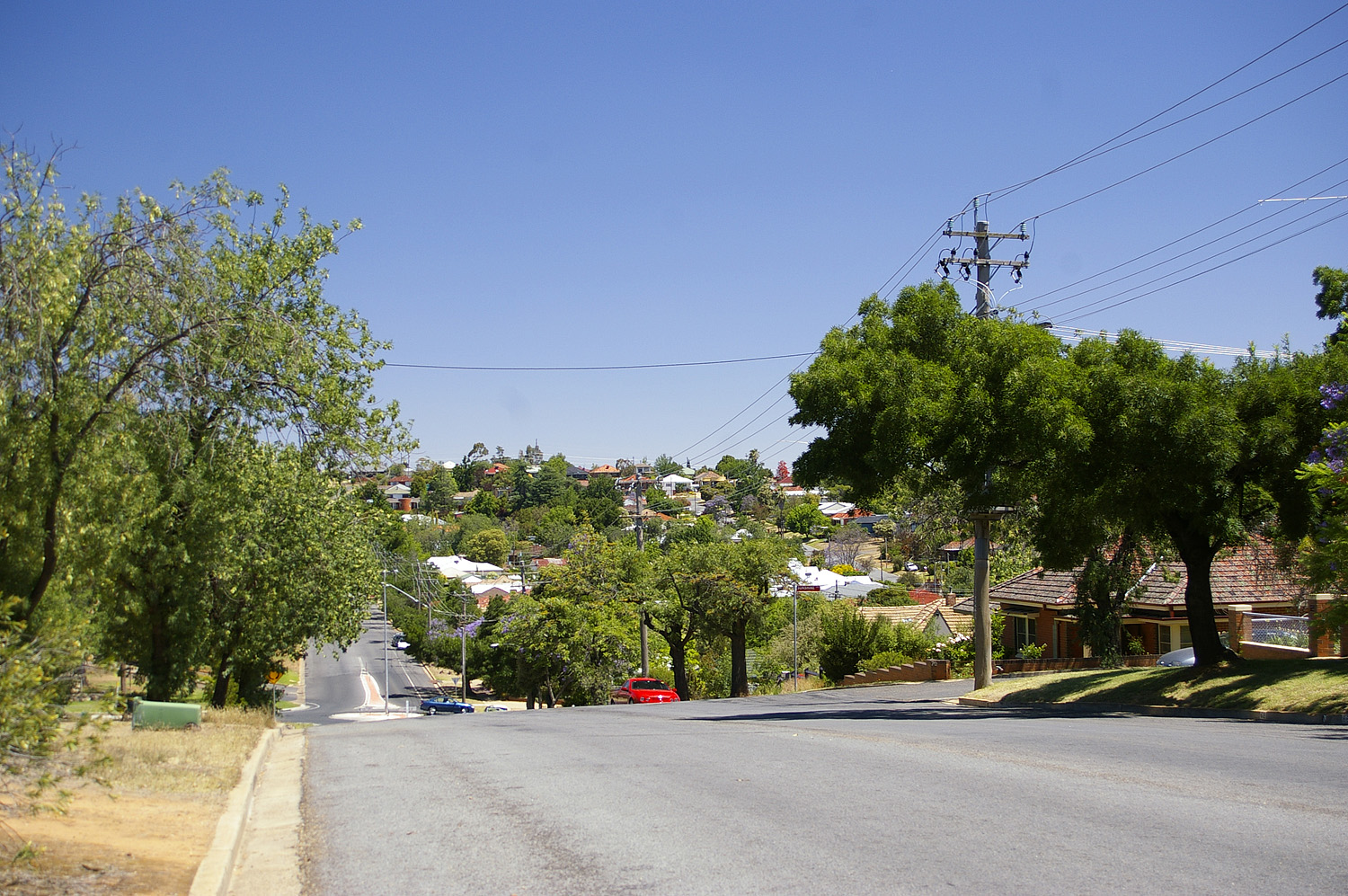
- Macleay Street, Turvey Park

- Coordinates: 35°7′34.06″S 147°21′25.48″E
- Population: 3,329 (2016 census)
- Postcode(s): 2650
- LGA(s): City of Wagga Wagga
- County: Wynyard
- Parish: South Wagga Wagga
- State electorate(s): Wagga Wagga
- Federal division(s): Riverina
Suburbs around Turvey Park:
Wagga Wagga	Wagga Wagga	Wagga Wagga
Glenfield Park	Turvey Park	Kooringal
Glenfield Park	Mount Austin	Kooringal

Turvey Park is an inner southern suburb of Wagga Wagga in southern New South Wales, Australia. Its boundaries are defined by Fernleigh Road to the south, Glenfield Road to the west, Coleman Street to the north and to the east by Willans Hill. Turvey Park is characterised by single detached dwellings, constructed in the period from the early 1900s through to the 1960s. These dwellings vary from the very substantial, as found in parts of Coleman Street and Grandview Parade, to the brick bungalows of the northern end of the suburb between Urana and Coleman Streets, to modest public housing, and a mixture of brick and fibro and weatherboard cottages at the southern end of the suburb. Another feature of Turvey Park are many corner shops, such on the corner of Heath and Urana Street, the corner of Norman and Coleman Streets, and the Corner of Bourke and Urana Streets.

Turvey Park was named after the property "Turvey Park" established by Thomas Turvey (died 14 January 1889), a licensee and store owner. A large family vault on the property was moved to the Church of England proportion of the Wagga Wagga Monumental Cemetery to allow for the construction of the intersection of Mitchelmore St and Hodson Ave in 1941. A commemorative plaque now marks the vicinity of the original site.

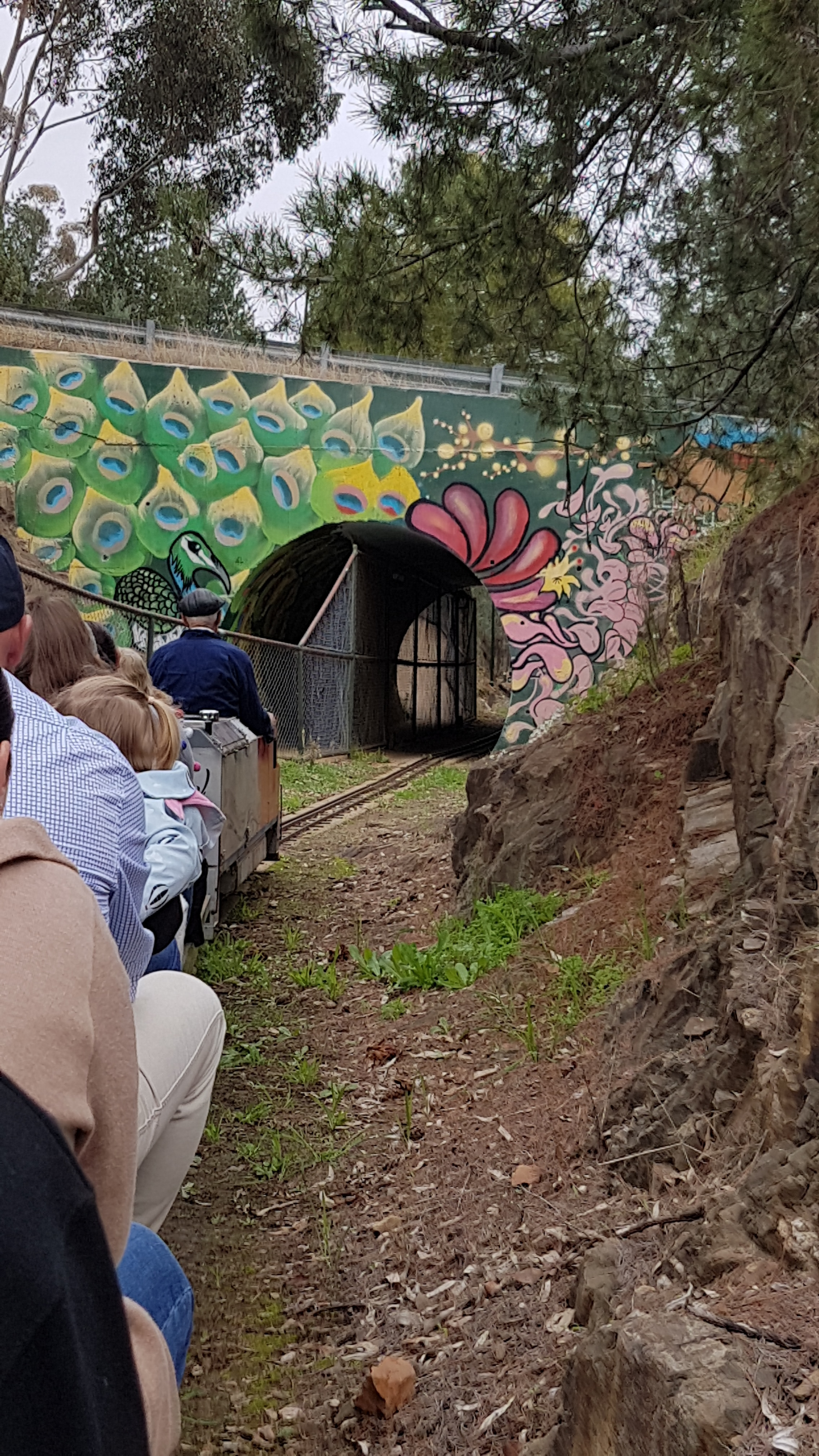
Henry's Tunnel on the Willans Hill Miniature Railway

A number of Wagga Wagga facilities are located in Turvey Park including the Wagga Wagga Botanic Gardens, the Willans Hill Miniature Railway, Wagga Wagga Showground, Turvey Park Public School, Wagga Wagga High School, Kildare Catholic College, Henschke Primary School, Wagga Wagga TAFE, 2AAA FM Studios, Hopwood Park Tennis Club, Gissing Oval, a Fire and Rescue NSW Station, the Riverina Juvenile Justice Centre, the Kay Hull Veterinary Teaching Hospital of Charles Sturt University, Our Lady of Fatima Catholic Church and St Paul's Anglican Church. The Turvey Tops shopping centre, despite taking its name from the suburb, is actually located in the adjoining suburb of Mt. Austin. A number of Wagga Wagga sporting clubs have their origins in Turvey Park, and share the Turvey Park name, including the Turvey Park Bulldogs of the Riverina Football League (Australian Rules), the former Turvey Park Lions of Group 9 Rugby League (later merging with Wagga Wagga Magpies to create South City Bulls), and the Turvey Park Softball Club.

Former Canterbury-Bankstown, New South Wales and Australian Rugby League player Steve Mortimer is nicknamed Turvey after the Turvey Park Rugby League club for whom he played for growing up in Wagga Wagga.

== History ==
The suburb was added to the municipality in 1939, however the subdivision of lands and the construction of dwellings commenced well before this, in the early 1900s. The annexure of the suburb followed long campaigns by Turvey Park residents for services available in central Wagga Wagga such as water supply and electricity. Throughout the 1940s and 1950s the New South Wales Housing Commission erected public housing within the suburb, particularly around the Blamey Street and Fernleigh Road areas, with allocation of homes determined by ballot, with a large percentage of the homes being reserved for returned servicemen. A number of these properties remain as Housing NSW social housing, whilst others have been transferred into private ownership.

In the late 1940s, Wagga Wagga Municipal Council carried out a replanning exercise in the southern part of Turvey Park in an area bounded by Urana Street, Macleay Street, Fernleigh Road, and Heath Street. Existing narrow laneways were widened to full width streets creating what are now Rudd, Croaker, Heydon, Hodson and Mair Streets, which facilitated more intensive subdivision of the area, by allowing the rear of the lots fronting wider, formal streets (such as Mitchelmore, Heath, Urana and Macleay Streets, as well as Fernleigh Road) to be excised. Remnants of this exercise remain, where full widening of the laneways was not possible due to dwellings already being in place, such as Heydon Avenue at the corner with Heath Street, and Rudd Street at its intersection with Blamey Street.

Initially, Turvey Park housed an annex of South Wagga Public School, which opened in 1948, and which was located at the Wagga Showgrounds in Bourke Street. A public school was granted to Turvey Park in 1949, on a site in Halloran Street, with Turvey Park Public School being officially open in 1952. Classes, continued at the showground site, however, with construction of the new school continuing for some time before all year groups relocated to the current site. The school was constructed as a 'demonstration school' to be used in the training of teacher's at the nearby Wagga Wagga Teacher's College (later Charles Sturt University South Campus), which is also located in Turvey Park.
