= Gregadoo, New South Wales =

Gregadoo New South Wales
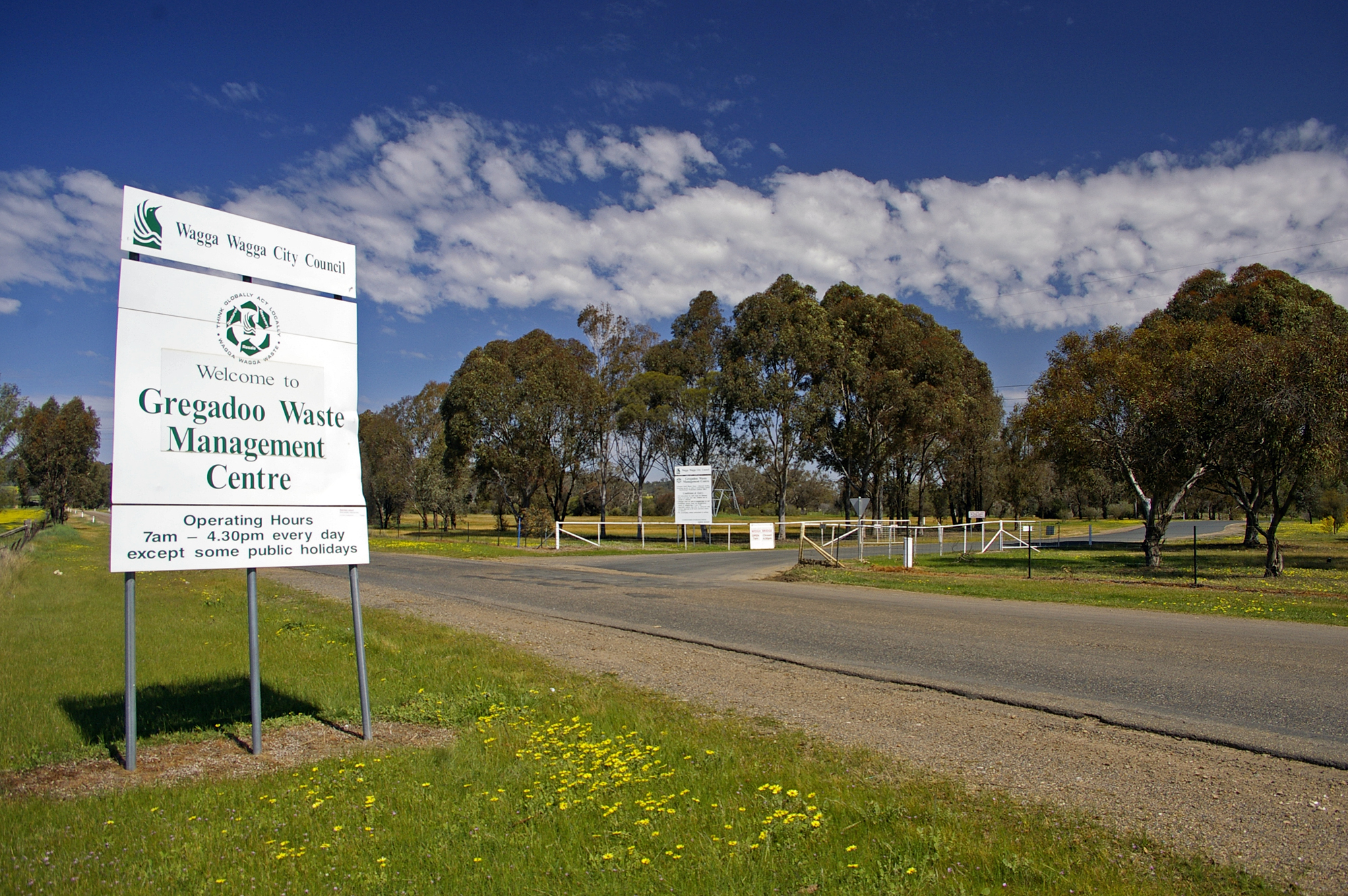
- Gregadoo Waste Management Centre

- Coordinates: 35°13′46″S 147°25′22″E
- Population: 239 (2016 census)
- Postcode(s): 2650
- Elevation: 132 m (433 ft)
- Location: 6 km (4 mi) from Lake Albert; 15 km (9 mi) from Wagga Wagga
- LGA(s): Wagga Wagga
- County: Wynyard
- Parish: Gregado
- State electorate(s): Wagga Wagga
- Federal division(s): Riverina

Gregadoo is a suburb of Wagga Wagga situated about 6 km South South-East of Lake Albert, New South Wales, Australia. It is situated by road, about 9 kilometres south east from Wagga Wagga.
