= City of Wagga Wagga =

Wagga Wagga
- Local government area
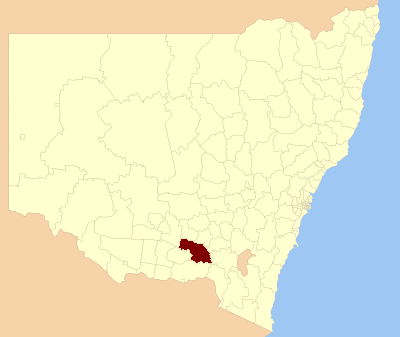
- Location in New South Wales

- Interactive map of Wagga Wagga
- Coordinates: 35°08′S 147°22′E
- Country: Australia
- State: New South Wales
- Region: Riverina
- Established: 15 March 1870 (Borough); 17 April 1946 (City)
- Council seat: Wagga Wagga

Government
  - Mayor: Dallas Tout
  - State electorate: Wagga Wagga
  - Federal division: Riverina

Area
  - Total: 4,825.9 km^{2} (1,863.3 sq mi)

Population
  - Totals: 62,385 (2016); 70,339 (2022 est.)
  - Density: 12.92712/km^{2} (33.4811/sq mi)
- Website: Wagga Wagga
LGAs around Wagga Wagga
Coolamon	Junee	Cootamundra-Gundagai
Narrandera	Wagga Wagga	Snowy Valleys
Lockhart	Greater Hume	Snowy Valleys

City of Wagga Wagga is a local government area in the Riverina region of southern New South Wales, Australia.

The mayor of the City of Wagga Wagga is Dallas Tout, an independent politician.

== City, town and localities ==
The City of Wagga Wagga includes the suburbs of

- Ashmont
- Bomen
- Bourkelands
- Boorooma
- Cartwrights Hill
- East Wagga Wagga
- Estella
- Forest Hill
- Glenfield Park
- Gumly Gumly
- Kapooka
- Kooringal
- Lake Albert
- Lloyd
- Mount Austin
- North Wagga Wagga
- San Isidore
- Tatton
- Tolland
- Turvey Park
- Wagga Wagga

as well as the villages of

- Tarcutta
- Ladysmith
- Mangoplah
- Uranquinty
- Collingullie
- Oura
- Humula
- Currawarna
- Galore

== History ==
Wagga Wagga was first incorporated as the Borough of Wagga Wagga on 15 March 1870. It received city status and became the City of Wagga Wagga on 17 April 1946. The municipality enlarged substantially on 1 January 1981 when the adjoining Shire of Kyeamba and Shire of Mitchell were amalgamated into the city.

== Heritage listings ==
The City of Wagga Wagga has a number of heritage-listed sites, including:

- Bomen, Main Southern railway: Bomen railway station
- Tarcutta, Tarcutta Street: Hambledon Homestead
- Wagga Wagga, Botanic Gardens Site (BGS), Baden Powell Drive: Mobile Cook's Galley, Museum of the Riverina
- Wagga Wagga, Main Southern railway: Wagga Wagga railway station

== Demographics ==
At the 2021 census, there were 69,047 people in the City of Wagga Wagga local government area, of these 48.6% were male and 51.4% were female. Aboriginal and Torres Strait Islander people made up 6.6% of the population, close to twice the national average of 3.2%. The median age of people in the City of Wagga Wagga was 35 years, which was lower than the national median of 38 years. Children aged 0 – 14 years made up 20.3% of the population and people aged 65 years and over made up 15.2% of the population. Of people in the area aged 15 years and over, 44.8% were married and 11.3% were either divorced or separated.

At the 2021 Census, 40.0% of residents stated their ancestry as Australian. Excluding not stated responses, 60.9% of residents in the City of Wagga Wagga nominated a religious affiliation with Christianity, which was higher than the national average of 47.1%. 85.3% of households only speak English at home, higher than the national average of 72%.

Selected historical census data for the City of Wagga Wagga local government area
Census year		2001	2006	2011	2016	2021
Population	Estimated residents on census night	54,845	▲57,015	▲59,458	▲62,385	▲67,609
Population	LGA rank in terms of size within New South Wales				39th	▼38th
Population	% of New South Wales population	0.87%	0.87%	▼0.86%	▼0.83%	▲0.84%
Population	% of Australian population	0.29%	0.29%	▼0.28%	▼0.27%	0.27%
Population	Estimated ATSI population on census night	1,767	▲2,336	▲2,731	▲3,508	▲4,471
Population	% of ATSI population to residents	3.2%	▲4.1%	▲4.6%	▲5.6%	▲6.6%
Median weekly incomes						
Personal income	Median weekly personal income	No Data	A$463	A$586	A$696	A$839
Personal income	% of Australian median income	No Data	99.36%	101.56%	105.14%	104.22%
Family income	Median weekly family income	No Data	A$1,137	A$1,418	A$1,682	A$2,060
Family income	% of Australian median income	No Data	97.10%	95.75%	97.00%	97.17%
Household income	Median weekly household income	No Data	A$967	A$1,149	A$1,354	A$1,638
Household income	% of Australian median income	No Data	94.16%	93.11%	94.16%	93.81%
Dwelling structure						
Dwelling type	Flat or apartment	8.8%	10.9%	10.3%	9.8%	9.2%
Dwelling type	Semi-detached, terrace or townhouse	4.6%	4.1%	4.2%	4.1%	4.8%
Dwelling type	Separate house	84.5%	84.2%	84.8%	84.9%	85.5%
Dwelling type	Other dwellings	0.8%	0.9%	0.6%	0.9%	0.4%
Dwelling type	Unoccupied dwellings	8.3%	8.2%	9.7%	10.2%	7.5%

Selected historical census data for the City of Wagga Wagga local government area
Ancestry, top responses
2001		2006		2011		2016		2021	
No Data		No Data		Australian (Note: The Australian Bureau of Statistics has stated that most who nominate "Australian" as their ancestry are part of the Anglo-Celtic group.)	45.4%	Australian	▼43.1%	Australian	▼40.0%
No Data		No Data		English	38.8%	English	▼39.7%	English	▼39.4%
No Data		No Data		Irish	13.8%	Irish	▲14.3%	Irish	▼12.9%
No Data		No Data		Scottish	10.1%	Scottish	▲10.7%	Scottish	10.7%
No Data		No Data		German	5.4%	German	▼5.3%	Aboriginal (Note: Those who nominated their ancestry as "Australian Aboriginal". Does not include Torres Strait Islanders. This relates to nomination of ancestry and is distinct from persons who identify as Indigenous (Aboriginal or Torres Strait Islander) which is a separate question.)	▲6.4%
Country of birth, top responses
2001		2006		2011		2016		2021	
Australia	89.3%	Australia	▼88.9%	Australia	▼87.8%	Australia	▼84.1%	Australia	▼83.0%
England	1.5%	England	1.5%	England	▼1.4%	England	▼1.3%	India	▲1.5%
New Zealand	0.7%	New Zealand	0.7%	New Zealand	0.7%	India	▲1.0%	Iraq	▲1.2%
Scotland	0.3%	India	▲0.3%	India	▲0.5%	New Zealand	0.7%	England	▼1.2%
Netherlands	0.3%	Scotland	0.3%	China	▲0.4%	Philippines	▲0.7%	New Zealand	0.7%
Germany	0.2%	Netherlands	▼0.2%	South Africa	▲0.3%	China	0.4%	Philippines	0.7%
Language, top responses (other than English)
2001		2006		2011		2016		2021	
Italian	0.3%	Arabic	▲0.3%	Arabic	▲0.5%	Malayalam	▲0.6%	Kurdish	▲1.0%
Greek	0.2%	Mandarin	▲0.2%	Mandarin	▲0.4%	Mandarin	▲0.5%	Malayalam	▲0.8%
Cantonese	0.2%	Cantonese	0.2%	Cantonese	0.2%	Arabic	0.5%	Mandarin	▲0.6%
Mandarin	0.1%	Italian	▼0.2%	Hindi	▲0.2%	Tagalog	▲0.3%	Arabic	0.5%
German	0.1%	Greek	▼0.1%	German	▲0.2%	Filipino	▲0.3%	Punjabi	▲0.4%
Religious affiliation, top responses
2001		2006		2011		2016		2021	
Catholic	33.5%	Catholic	▼33.4%	Catholic	▼33.2%	Catholic	▼30.6%	No Religion	▲31.3%
Anglican	26.6%	Anglican	▼25.5%	Anglican	▼23.9%	No Religion	▲22.2%	Catholic	▼27.1%
No Religion	9.4%	No Religion	▲11.6%	No Religion	▲15.0%	Anglican	▼19.5%	Anglican	▼15.3%
Presbyterian/Reformed	7.6%	Presbyterian/ Reformed	▼7.1%	Uniting Church	▼5.5%	Presbyterian/ Reformed	4.9%	Presbyterian/ Reformed	▼3.8%
Uniting Church	7.1%	Uniting Church	▼6.4%	Presbyterian/ Reformed	▼4.9%	Uniting Church	▼4.5%	Uniting Church	▼3.4%
Not Stated	n/c	Not Stated	n/c	Not Stated	n/c	Not Stated	7.9%	Not Stated	▼6.4%

== Council ==
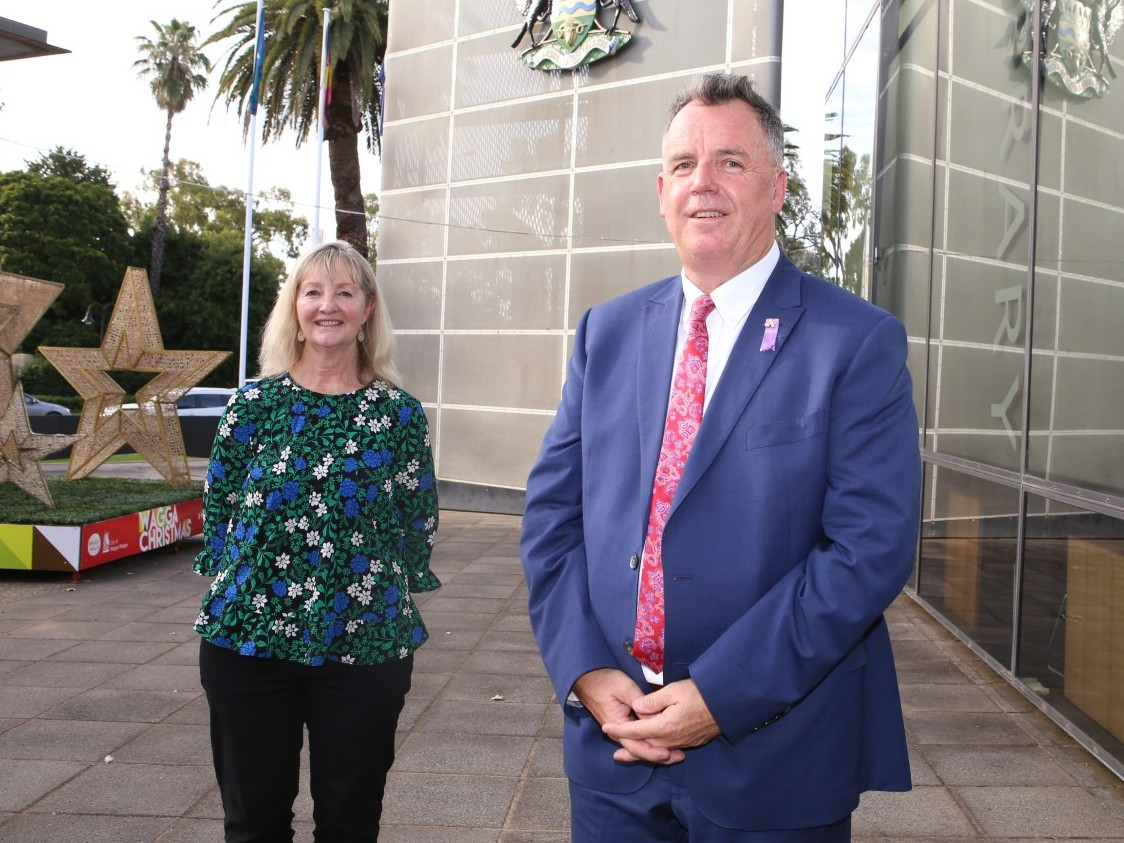
Mayor of the City of Wagga Wagga Cr Dallas Tout and Deputy Mayor Cr Jenny McKinnon

=== Current composition and election method ===
Wagga Wagga City Council (WWCC) is composed of nine councillors elected proportionally as a single ward. All councillors are elected for a fixed four-year term of office. The mayor is elected by the councillors at the first meeting of the council. The most recent election was held on 4 December 2021, and the makeup of the council is as follows:

Party	Councillors
Independents	5
Labor Party	2
Getting It Done	1
Greens	1
Total	9

The current Council, elected in 2021, is:

Councillor	Party	Notes
Dallas Tout	Independent	Mayor
Jenny McKinnon	Greens	Deputy Mayor
Dan Hayes	Labor	
Amelia Parkins	Labor	
Richard Foley	Independent	
Tim Koschel	Independent	
Michael Henderson	Independent	
Rod Kendall	Independent	
Georgie Davis	Getting It Done	

A referendum was held on 8 September 2012 and an absolute majority of voters resolved in favour to reduce the number of councillors from eleven to nine. The change came into effect at the September 2016 elections.

=== Administration staff ===
In December 2009, Wagga Wagga City Council announced that it had appointed Phil Pinyon as the general manager of the Wagga Wagga City Council replacing Lyn Russell, who suddenly announced her resignation in October 2009, after completing 18 months of her five-year contract.

=== Cutting ties with China's Sister City ===
In April 2020, The Wagga council voted to cut ties with China's Kunming city; a week later they would vote again joining Kunming as a sister city.

== Election results ==
=== 2024 ===
2024 New South Wales local elections: Wagga Wagga
Party	Candidate	Votes	%	±%
Your Voice Matters To Us	1. Timothy Koschel (elected 1); 2. Allana Condron (elected 5); 3. Mick Henderson; 4. Chris Ingram; 5. Jacinta Evans	8,369	22.9	+14.1
Community First	1. Dallas Tout (elected 2); 2. Karissa Subedi (elected 9); 3. Marie (Pascale) Vythilingum; 4. Megan Norton; 5. Nin Nin Sang Dong	5,952	16.3	+6.3
Labor	1. Amelia Parkins (elected 3); 2. Tim Kurylowicz; 3. Peita Vincent; 4. Steven Dale; 5. Mark Jeffreson	4,716	12.9	−10.1
Getting It Done	1. Georgina Davies (elected 4); 2. Karen Butts; 3. Pradeep Kurien; 4. Sarah Humphries; 5. Steve Taylor	4,412	12.1	+5.7
Foley's Five	1. Richard Foley (elected 6); 2. Christopher Kanck; 3. Shahnaz Akter; 4. Wayne Deaner; 5. Alisha Watkins	2,984	8.2	−15.8
Greens	1. Jenny McKinnon (elected 7); 2. Sam Ryot; 3. George Benedyka; 4. Virginia Gawler; 5. Emma Rush	2,279	6.2	−3.1
Building Tomorrow Together	1. Lindsay Tanner (elected 8); 2. Ali Tanner; 3. Clare Lawlor; 4. Michael Nugent; 5. Andrew Roberts	2,144	5.9	+5.9
Christians	1. Paul McCausland; 2. Christopher Cowell; 3. Paul Cocks; 4. Dorcas Musyimi; 5. Darcy Maybon	1,585	4.3	+4.3
Fix Our Roads	1. Robert Sinclair; 2. Kane Salamon; 3. Rosina Gordon; 4. Julie Sinclair; 5. Cassidy Turner	1,514	4.1	+4.1
Supporting Diversity	1. Rory McKenzie; 2. Samuel Avo; 3. Gail Manderson; 4. Midya Bari; 5. Anna Gannon	939	2.6	−9.7
Ready To Serve	1. Ryan Dedini; 2. Kelly O'Kane; 3. Andrew Tuovi; 4. John Kennedy; 5. Sarah-Jane Jameson	832	2.3	+2.3
Voice of Wagga Residents	1. Saba Nabi; 2. Singh Manjinder; 3. Birenbhai Patel; 4. Priyanka Udeniya; 5. Hina Ashfaq	640	1.7	+1.7
Independent	Rosyln Prangnell	159	0.4	+0.4
Total formal votes		36,525	91.9	
Informal votes		3,233	8.1	
Turnout		39,758		

=== 2021 ===
Elected councillor	Party
Michael Henderson	Clean Out Council
Richard Foley	Clean Out Council
Dan Hayes	Labor
Amelia Parkins	Labor
Rod Kendall	Independent (Group D)
Dallas Tout	Community First
Jenny McKinnon	Greens
Tim Koschel	Here For You
Georgie Davis	Getting It Done

2021 New South Wales local elections: Wagga Wagga
Party	Candidate	Votes	%	±%
Clean Out Council		9,201	25.6	
Labor		8,279	23.1	+6.1
Independent (Group D)		4,416	12.3	
Community First		3,576	10.0	
Greens		3,347	9.3	+5.0
Here For You		2,808	7.8	
Getting It Done		2,291	6.4	
Independent (Group F)		837	2.3	+2.3
Independent Liberal	Robert Sinclair	572	1.6	
Independent Liberal	Rosina Gordon	287	0.8	
Independent	Richard Salcole	235	0.7	
Independent Liberal	Robin Dennis	20	0.1	
Independent Liberal	Daniel Vieria	16	0.0	
Total formal votes		35,885	93.2	
Informal votes		2,634	6.8	
Turnout		38,519	83.3	

=== 2016 ===
2016 New South Wales local elections: Wagga Wagga
Party	Candidate	Votes	%	±%
Independent	1. Rod Kendall (elected 1); 2. Tim Koschel (elected 5); 3. David Merlino; 4. Donna Argus; 5. Paul Watson; 6. Leila Bright; 7. Robyn Krik	6,840	20.50	
Country Labor	1. Dan Hayes (elected 2); 2. Vanessa Keenan (elected 8); 3. Leah Ellis; 4. Bethany Saab; 5. James Halliburton	5,670	17.00	
Independent	1. Kerry Pascoe (elected 3); 2. Michelle Bray; 3. Belinda Coleman; 4. Tim Sheather; 5. Steven Wait	4,540	13.61	
Independent	1. Paul Funnell (elected 4); 2. Tina Gavel; 3. Jack Egan; 4. Mick Henderson; 5. Denise Flack	4,545	13.62	
Independent	1. Yvonne Braid (elected 6); 2. Greg Packer; 3. Simone Lieschke; 4. Brett Grant; 5. Myriam Hribar	1,882	5.64	
Independent	Greg Conkey (elected 7)	1,181	3.54	
Independent	Dallas Tout (elected 9)	876	2.63	
Independent	1. Andreia Schineanu; 2. Atlanta Hall; 3. Bianca Miller; 4. Kerri-Anne Miller; 5. Jenni Campbell	1,653	4.96	
Greens	1. Kevin Poynter; 2. Jacquie Tinkler; 3. Emma Rush; 4. Michael Bayles; 5. Ray Goodlass	1,447	4.34	
Australia First	1. Lorraine Sharp; 2. Robbie Williams; 3. Jean Williams; 4. Chris Sharp; 5. Jean Huges	1,476	4.42	
Independent	Alan Brown	584	1.75	
Independent	Mary Kidson	546	1.64	
Independent	Simone Eyles	413	1.24	
Independent	Richard Foley	506	1.52	
Independent	Peter Dale	435	1.30	
Independent	Anabel Williams	395	1.18	
Independent	1. Ros Prangnell; 2. Patricia Murray	223	0.67	
Independent	Peter Templeton	147	0.44	
Total formal votes		33,359	93.85	
Informal votes		2,186	6.15	
Turnout		35,545	80.54	

== Symbols and emblems ==
Crows are considered a symbol of the city of Wagga Wagga, appearing in the council's logo, coat of arms, and throughout local business logos and public artworks. This is due to the debated interpretation of 'Wagga Wagga' being derived from a Wiradjuri term meaning 'place of many crows'. The floral emblem for the city is the silver banksia.

=== Coat of arms ===
Coat of arms of the City of Wagga Wagga
Notes Granted by the Kings of Arms. Adopted 15 November 1965 Crest Out of a Mural Crown in front of a Caduceus Or, winged Sable, eight leaves of the river red gum tree (Eucalyptus camaldulensis) conjoined and in the form of two letters W proper. Helm A closed helmet. Escutcheon Vert, on a Fess between in chief eight stalks of Wheat, each four in the form of the letter W, and in base a Merino Ram's head caboshed, all Or, a Bar wavy Azure. Supporters On either side a Crow wings addorsed proper, gorged with a Collar dancetty Or, and perched on a forked twig. Compartment A compartment of grass divided by Water Barry wavy Argent and Azure. Motto Forward in Faith Other elements Mantling Vert doubled Or. Symbolism The colours of green and gold, and the gold band on green in the escutcheon are taken from the arms of Captain Charles Sturt, the first European explorer of the area. The wavy blue line represents the Murrumbidgee River. The wheat (arranged as two "W" letters for the city name), and the Merino Ram head are for the principal industries of the city. The eight river red gum leaves in the crest are also arranged as two "W" letters and are placed in front of the Caduceus, the symbol of Mercury, the Roman god of commerce. The crow supporters with "W" collars are taken from the former Council seal and allude to the meaning of Wagga Wagga ("the place of many crows"). The compartment of grass divided by water represents the building of the city on both sides of the river.

== Gallery ==
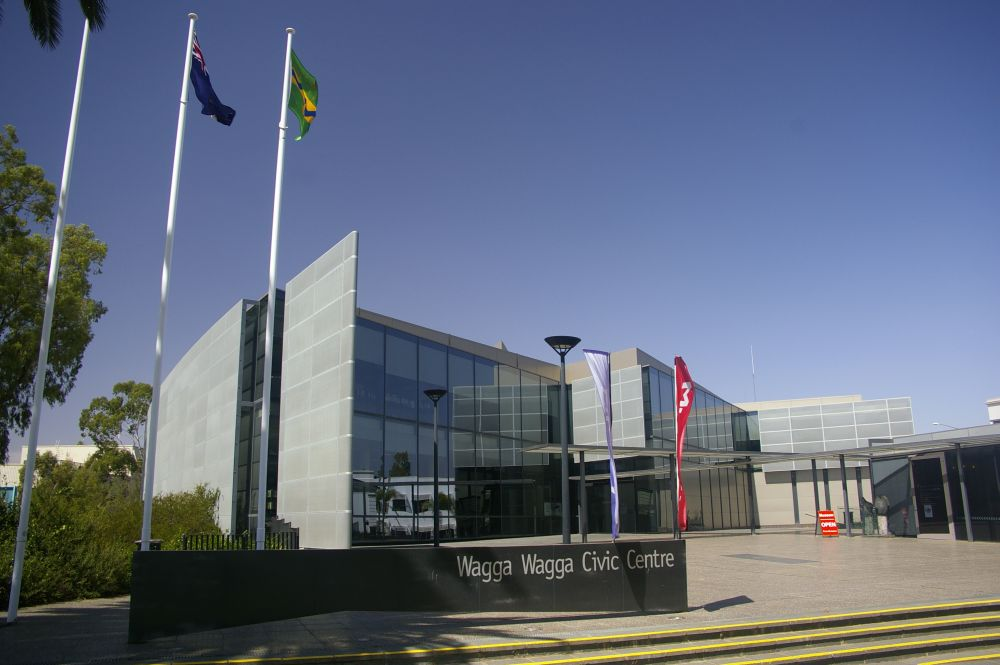
Wagga Wagga Civic Centre

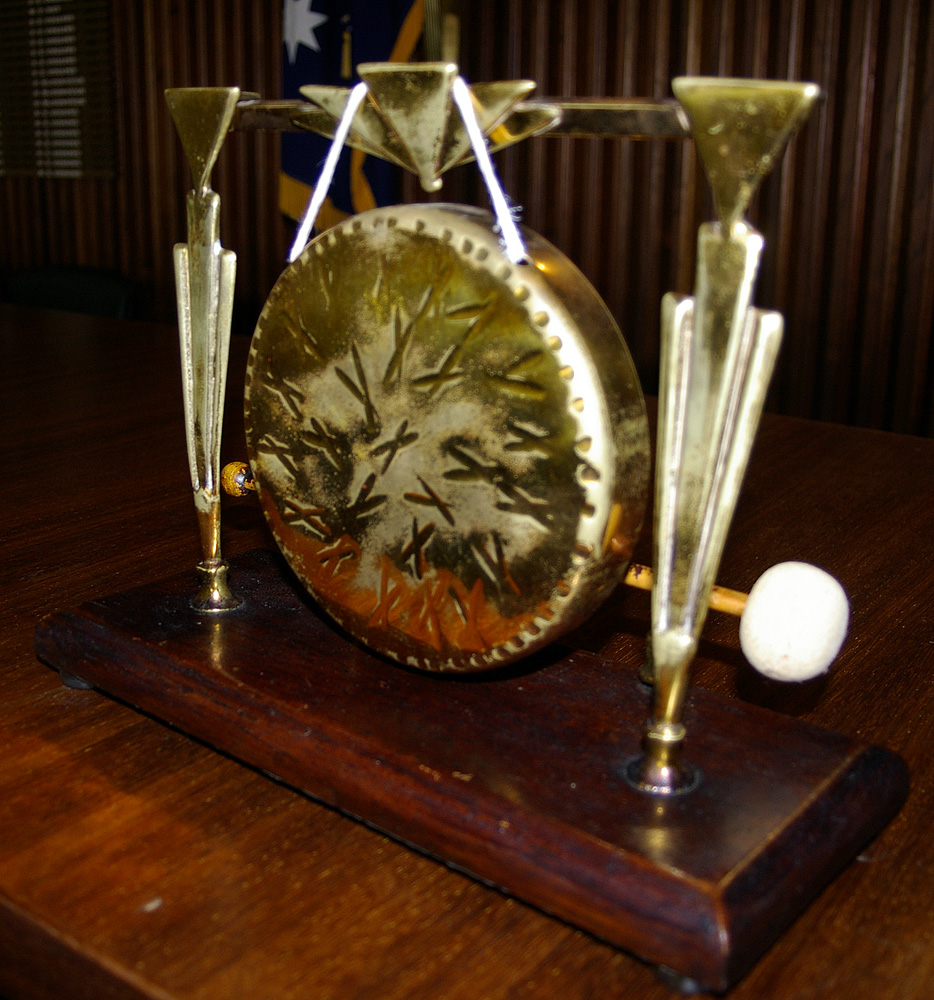
City Council Mayoral gong. Stolen 2 January 2009, remains unfound

== See also ==
- Riverina Water County Council
