= Kooringal, New South Wales =

Coordinates: 35.135°S 147.376°E

Kooringal
- Suburb
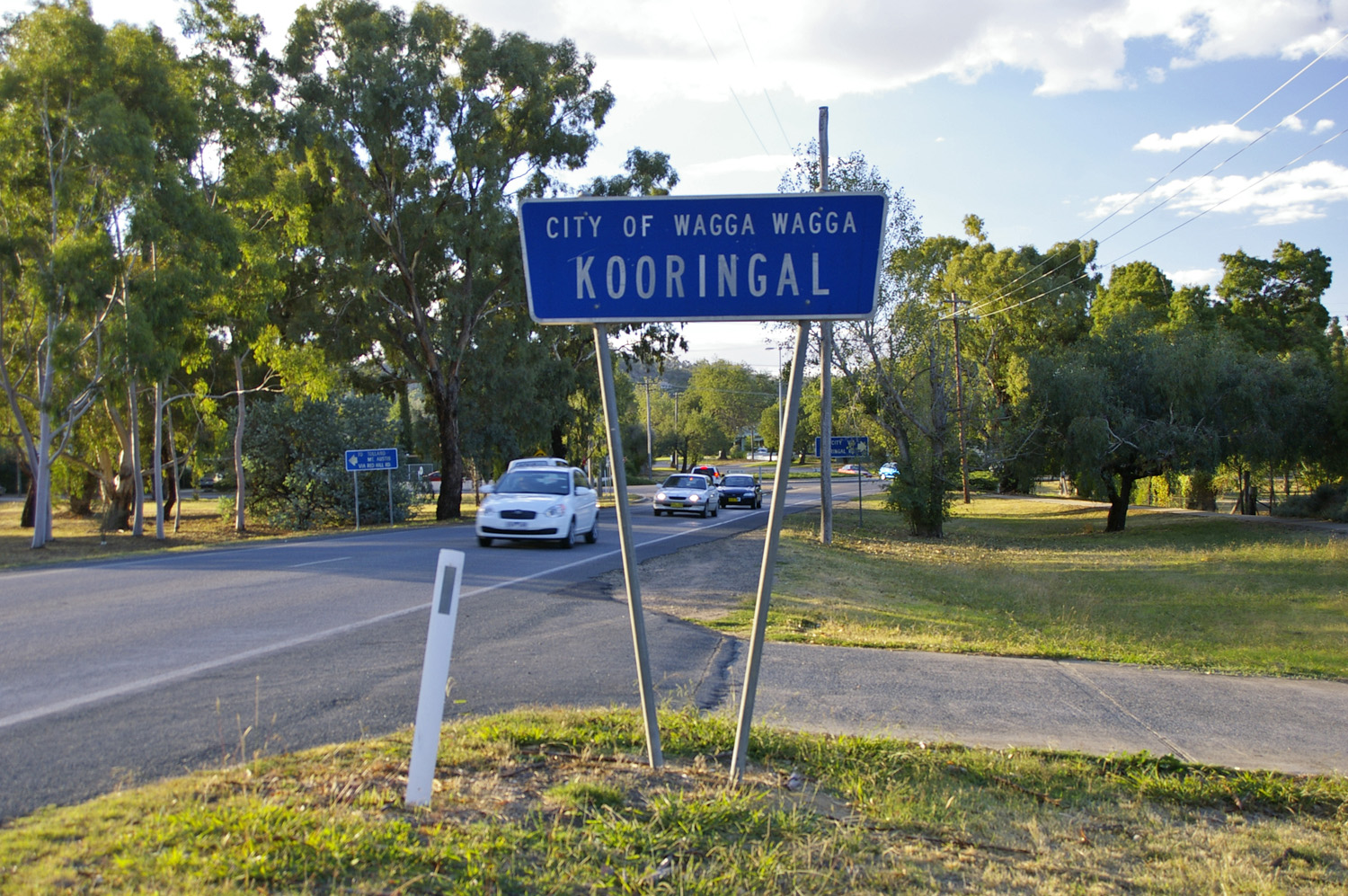
- Suburb of Kooringal
- Interactive map of Kooringal
- Country: Australia
- State: New South Wales
- City: Wagga Wagga
- LGA: City of Wagga Wagga

Government
  - State electorate: Wagga Wagga
  - Federal division: Riverina

Population
  - Total: 7,227 (2016 census)
- Postcode: 2650
- County: Wynyard
- Parish: South Wagga Wagga
Suburbs around Kooringal
Turvey Park	Wagga Wagga	East Wagga Wagga
Mount Austin	Kooringal	Forest Hill
Tatton	Lake Albert	Forest Hill

Kooringal is a suburb of Wagga Wagga, New South Wales, Australia. Kooringal is thought to mean "Side of a Hill" in the Wiradjuri aboriginal language. Kooringal is located approximately 4 km from the CBD along Lake Albert Road. Kooringal is the basis for growth in the eastern section of Wagga Wagga. Kooringal High School, on Ziegler Avenue is the largest secondary school in Wagga Wagga. The Kooringal area is also home to other schools including Kooringal Public School, Sturt Public School and the Sacred Heart School. Kooringal has a large suburban shopping centre known as Kooringal Mall.

== Climate ==
Climate data for Kooringal
Month	Jan	Feb	Mar	Apr	May	Jun	Jul	Aug	Sep	Oct	Nov	Dec	Year
Record high °C (°F)	47.2 (117.0)	47.2 (117.0)	41.2 (106.2)	35.6 (96.1)	28.6 (83.5)	25.0 (77.0)	24.4 (75.9)	26.7 (80.1)	35.0 (95.0)	39.9 (103.8)	43.3 (109.9)	46.7 (116.1)	47.2 (117.0)
Mean daily maximum °C (°F)	33.0 (91.4)	32.3 (90.1)	28.9 (84.0)	23.5 (74.3)	18.3 (64.9)	14.0 (57.2)	13.5 (56.3)	15.8 (60.4)	19.5 (67.1)	23.8 (74.8)	28.1 (82.6)	31.4 (88.5)	23.5 (74.3)
Mean daily minimum °C (°F)	16.4 (61.5)	16.2 (61.2)	13.4 (56.1)	8.9 (48.0)	5.0 (41.0)	3.5 (38.3)	2.3 (36.1)	3.4 (38.1)	5.6 (42.1)	8.4 (47.1)	11.8 (53.2)	14.8 (58.6)	9.1 (48.4)
Record low °C (°F)	3.3 (37.9)	4.4 (39.9)	0.0 (32.0)	−3.3 (26.1)	−7.2 (19.0)	−7.8 (18.0)	−8.9 (16.0)	−6.7 (19.9)	−5.0 (23.0)	−3.3 (26.1)	−0.6 (30.9)	3.3 (37.9)	−8.9 (16.0)
Average rainfall mm (inches)	40.0 (1.57)	39.2 (1.54)	43.1 (1.70)	44.0 (1.73)	49.4 (1.94)	58.5 (2.30)	50.0 (1.97)	52.9 (2.08)	48.5 (1.91)	56.7 (2.23)	42.2 (1.66)	37.5 (1.48)	562 (22.11)
Average rainy days	4.4	4.3	4.8	6.1	8.0	10.6	11.0	11.0	9.0	8.1	5.8	4.9	88
Average afternoon relative humidity (%) (at 3 P.M.)	31	35	39	45	55	65	64	57	49	43	35	22	45
Average dew point °C (°F)	10.1 (50.2)	12.0 (53.6)	11.0 (51.8)	8.8 (47.8)	7.9 (46.2)	6.7 (44.1)	6.0 (42.8)	5.9 (42.6)	6.5 (43.7)	7.4 (45.3)	7.7 (45.9)	8.8 (47.8)	8.2 (46.8)
Source: Bureau of Meteorology

== History ==
The suburb of Kooringal was a dairy and grazing property and homestead in the 1960s which was also named Kooringal. Kooringal was at one point called Henwood Park Settlement due to the extensive area subdivided by pastoralist, Stan Henwood. "Darrung" Post Office established in Henwood Park Settlement at the request of locals however the name disappeared when the Wagga Wagga City Council named the suburb Kooringal after the property. Stage one of The Kooringal Mall with ten shops was established in October 1968 and stage two was completed in August 1971 with another nine shops added.

== Gallery ==
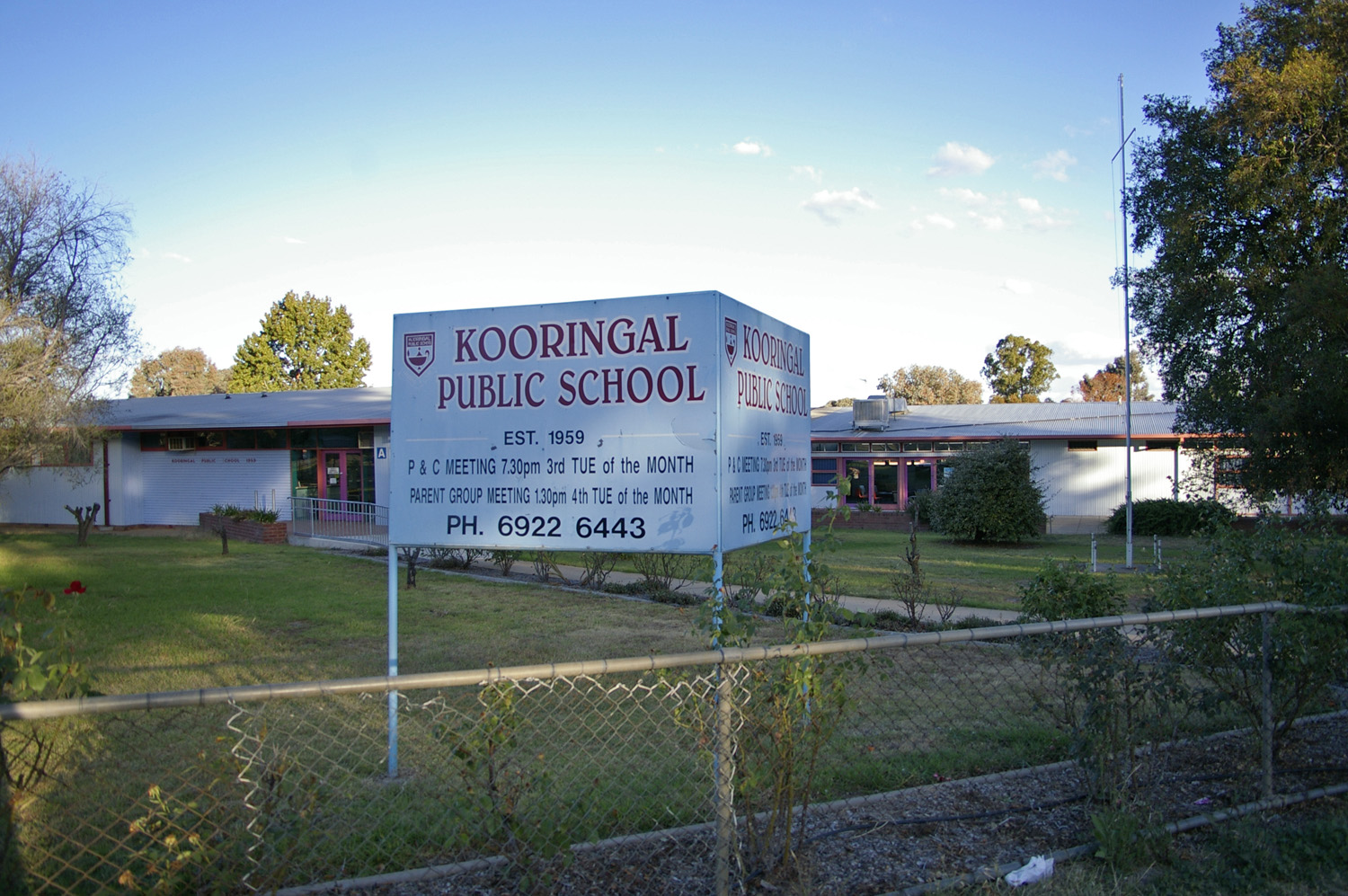
Kooringal Public School

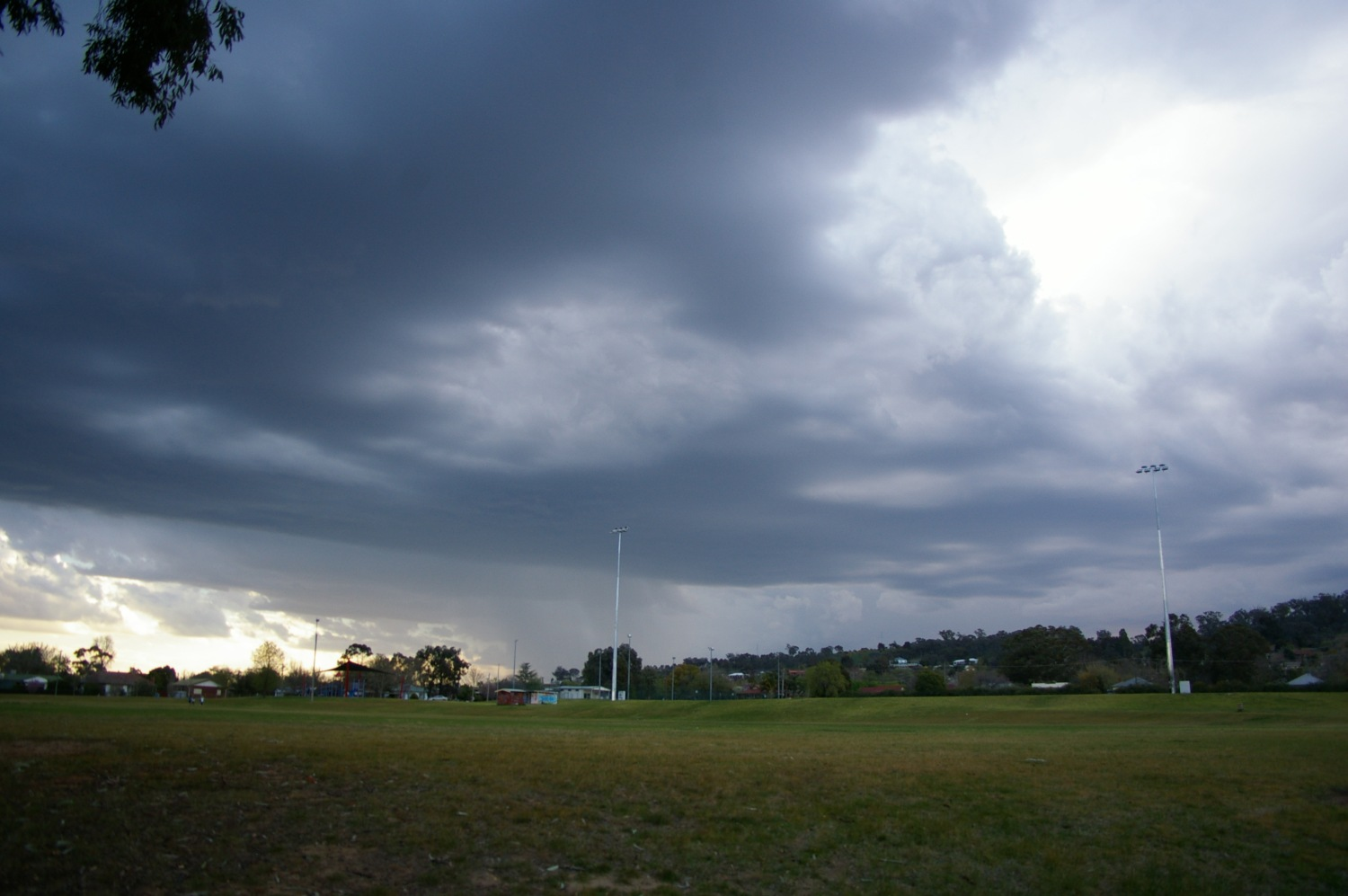
Henwood Park

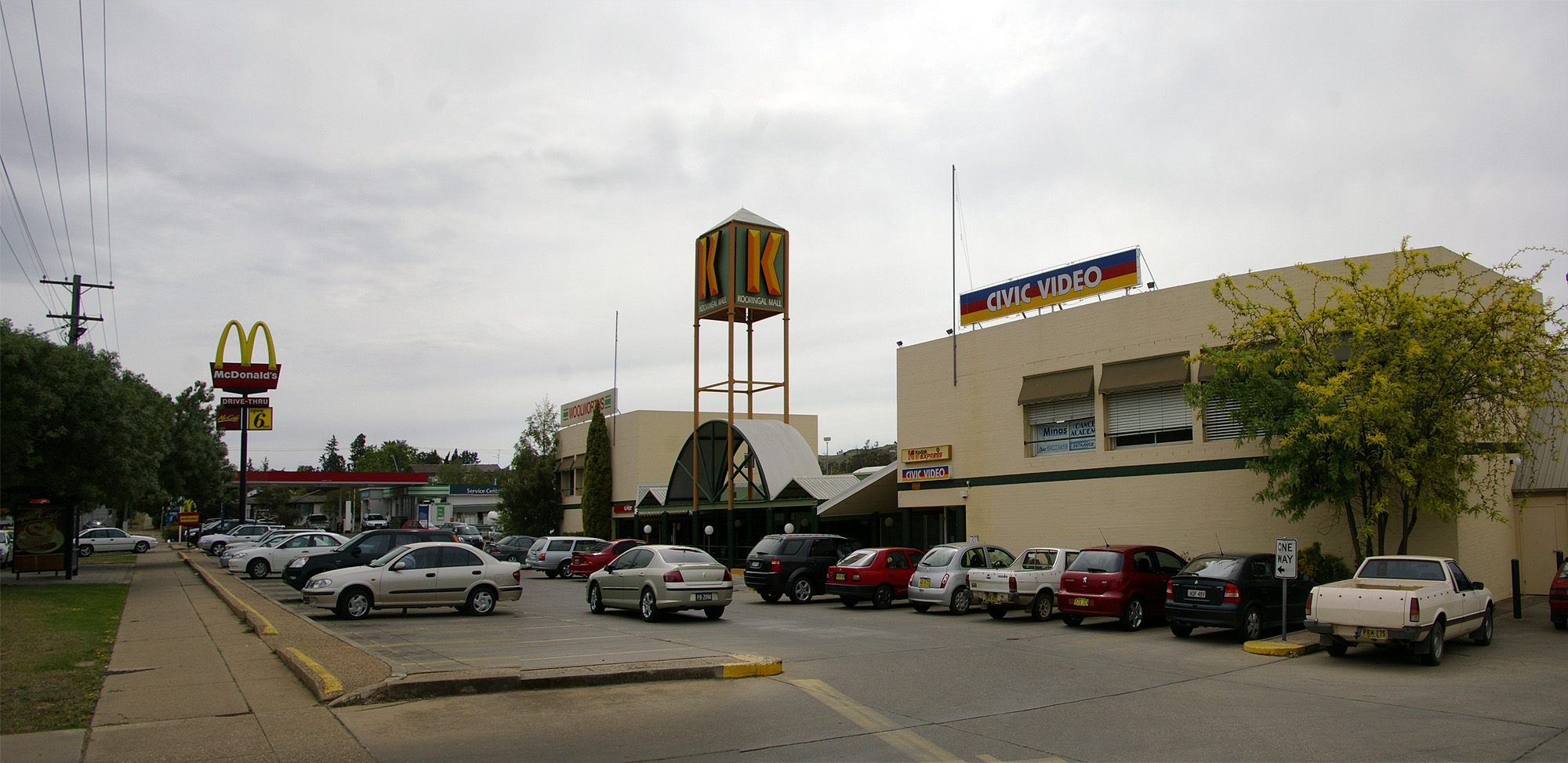
Kooringal Mall

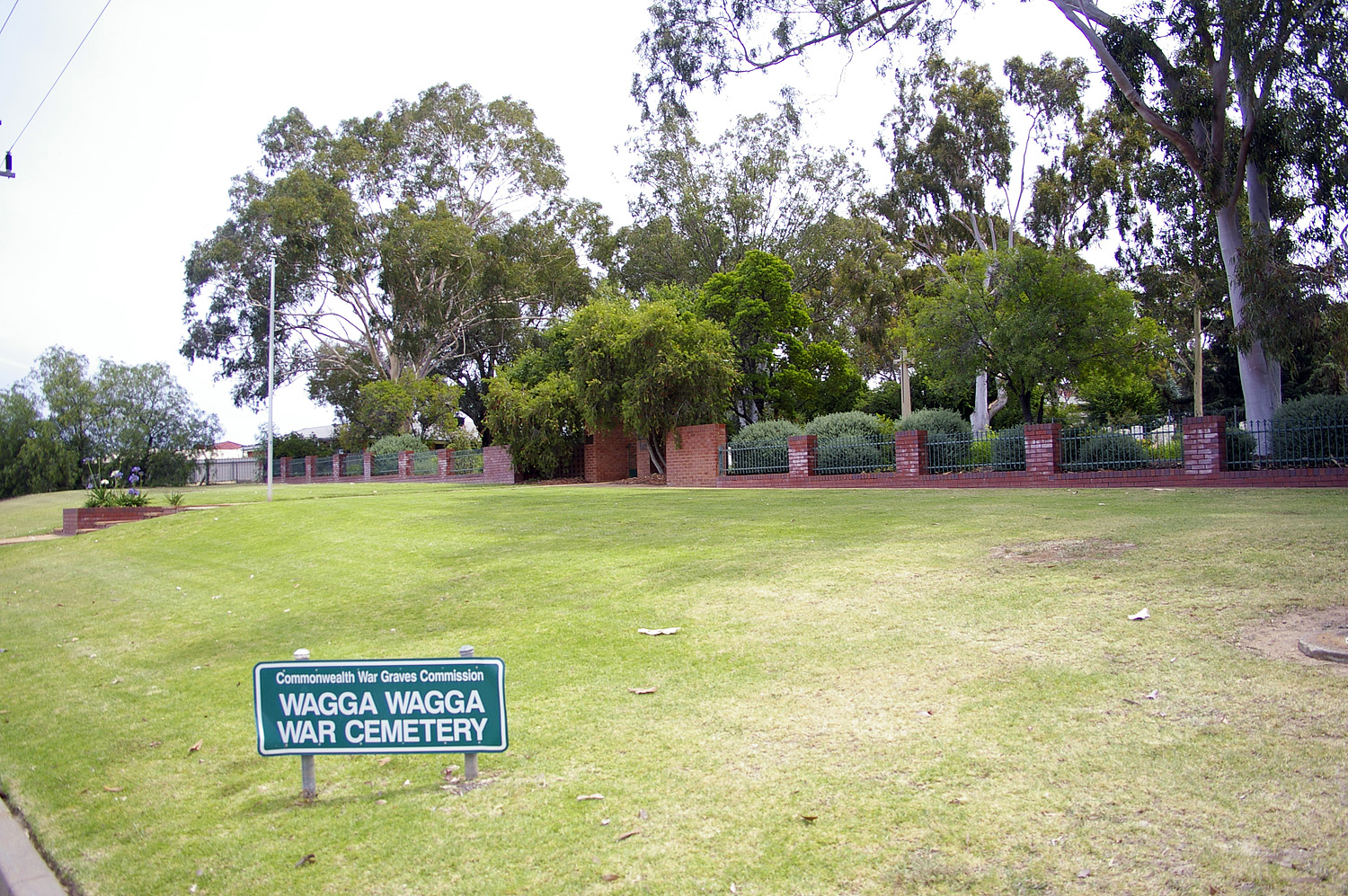
Wagga Wagga War Cemetery
