= Kapooka, New South Wales =

Kapooka
- Suburb
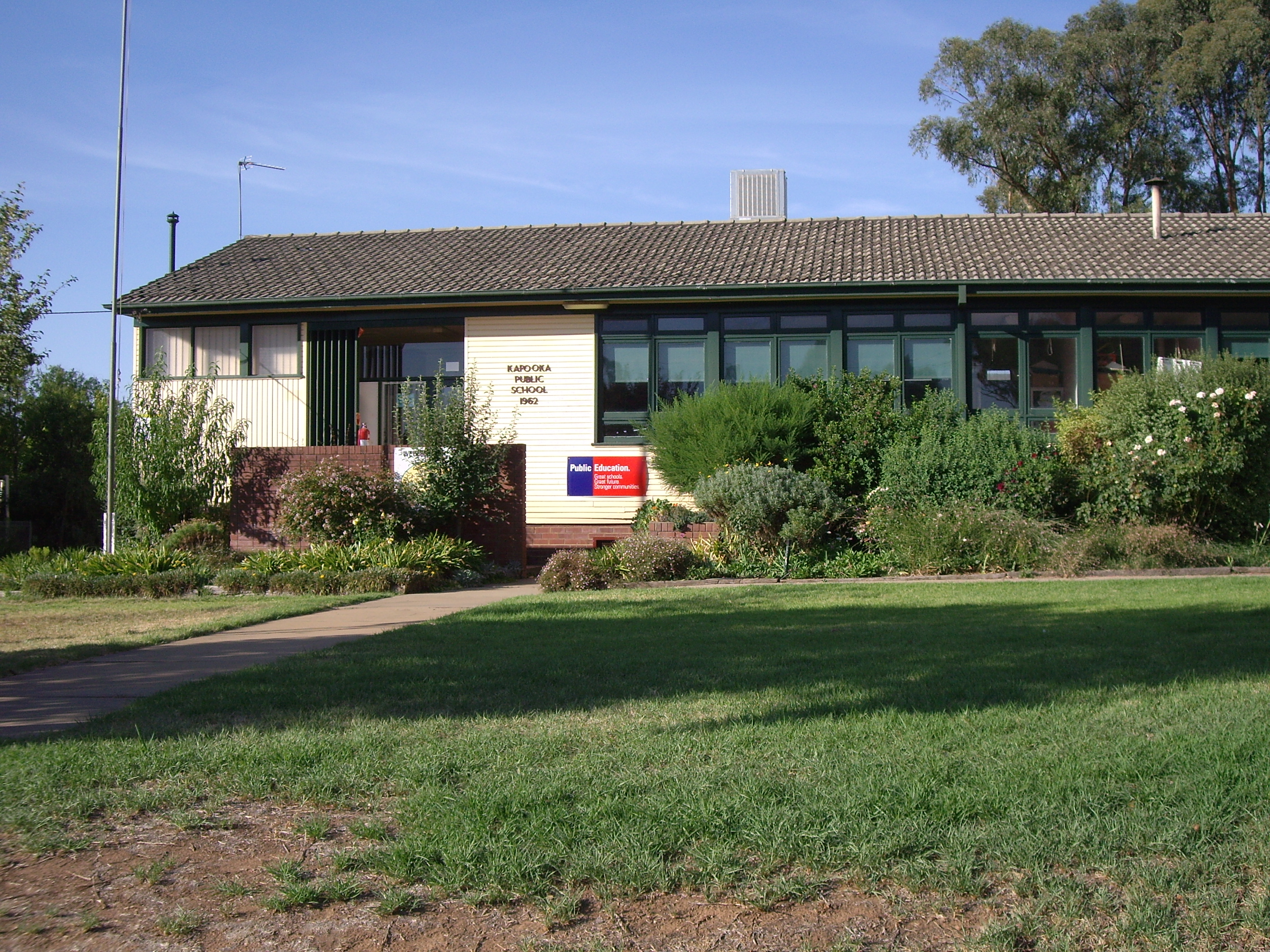
- Kapooka Public School

- Interactive map of Kapooka
- Coordinates: 35°9′7.66″S 147°18′7.48″E
- Country: Australia
- State: New South Wales
- City: Wagga Wagga
- LGA: City of Wagga Wagga
- Location: 9 km (5.6 mi) from Wagga Wagga CBD; 8 km (5.0 mi) from Uranquinty

Government
  - State electorate: Wagga Wagga
  - Federal division: Riverina

Population
  - Total: 395 (2021 census)
- Postcode: 2661
- County: Mitchell
- Parish: Uranquinty
- Annual rainfall: 595.9 mm (23.46 in)

Kapooka ('place of winds' in Wiradjuri) a suburb in the south-west of Wagga Wagga, New South Wales, Australia.

Kapooka is home to the Department of Defence's Blamey Barracks from where the Army Recruit Training Centre conducts its operations.

It is located on the Olympic Highway, between Wagga Wagga and Uranquinty.
