= Lake Albert, New South Wales =

Coordinates: 35.166°S 147.381°E

Lake Albert Wagga Wagga, New South Wales
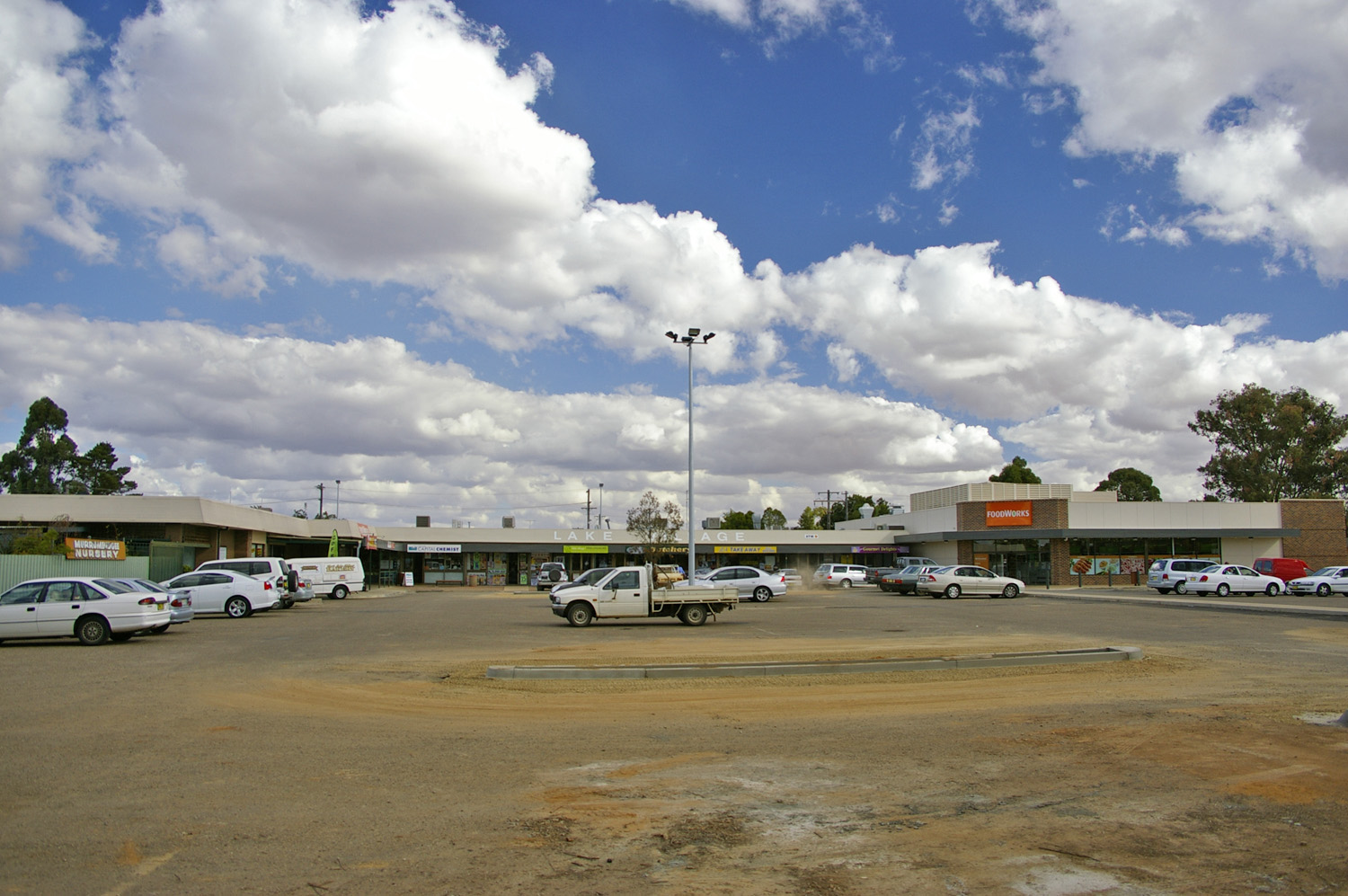
- Lake Village Shopping Centre

- Population: 6,192 (2016 census)
- Established: 1868
- Postcode(s): 2650
- Elevation: 205 m (673 ft)
- Location: 9 km (6 mi) SE of Wagga Wagga; 126 km (78 mi) NNE of Albury; 458 km (285 mi) SW of Sydney
- LGA(s): City of Wagga Wagga
- County: Wynyard
- Parish: Rowan
- State electorate(s): Wagga Wagga
- Federal division(s): Riverina
Suburbs around Lake Albert:
Tatton	Kooringal	Gumly Gumly
Springvale	Lake Albert	Forest Hill
Rowan	Gregadoo	Ladysmith

Lake Albert is a suburb of the city of Wagga Wagga, New South Wales, Australia, on the shores of Lake Albert from which it is named. The suburb has three schools; Lake Albert Public School, Mater Dei Primary School and Mater Dei Catholic College. The Lake Village Shopping Centre, built-in 1980, is located within the suburb and houses Foodworks supermarket and specialty shops. The area is family-friendly and is often used for outside physical activities, barbeques, and playing on the playground. Boats are able to enter the lake and water skiing is permitted. Around the lake are light posts donated by families and businesses around Wagga. This allows for activities to take place at sunset/sunrise. Exercise stations are scattered around the lake and are free for any given use. Water taps for drinking are available for human and animals (dogs). Two blocks of toilets opposite to each other are around the lake.
