= Wagga Wagga =

- City
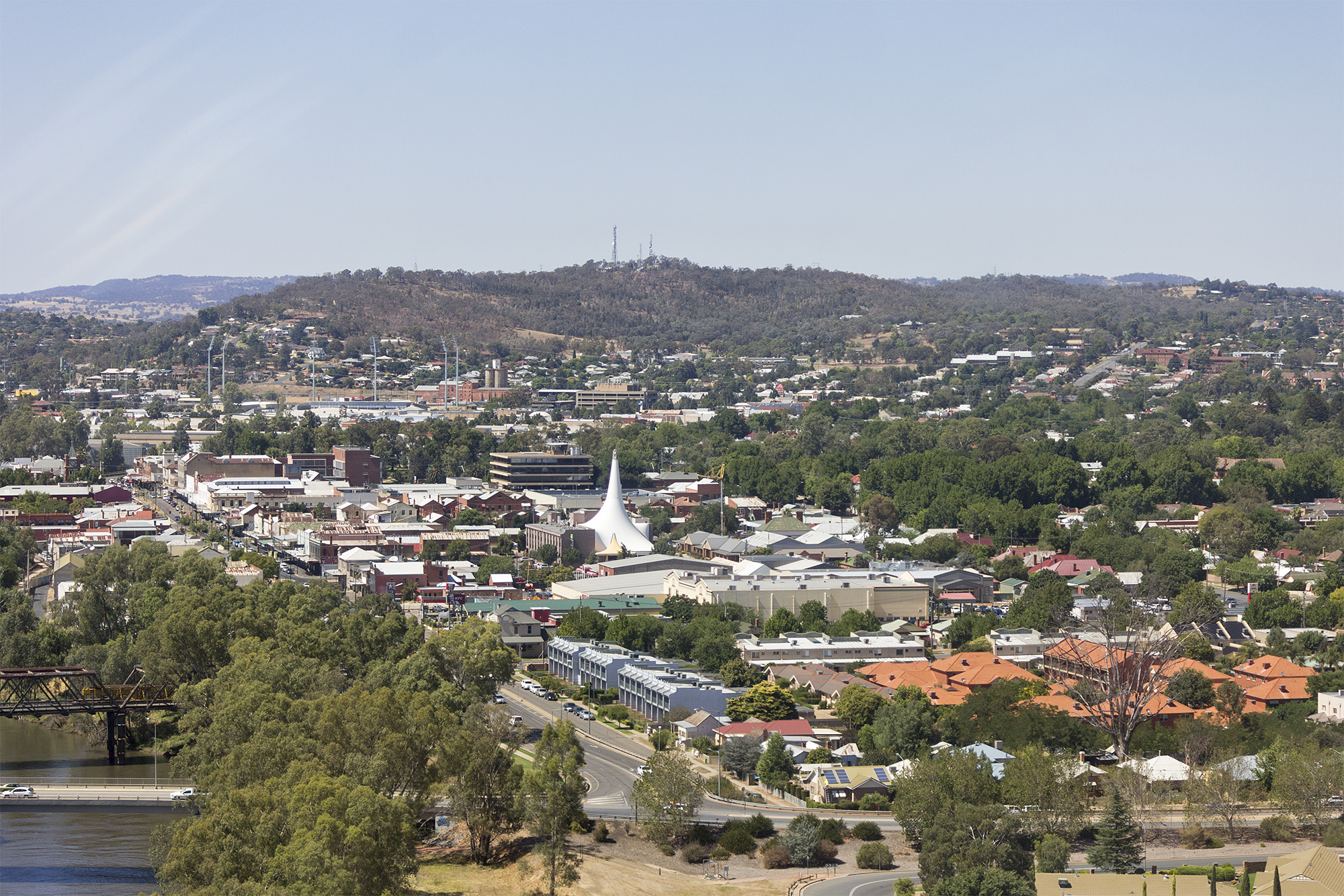
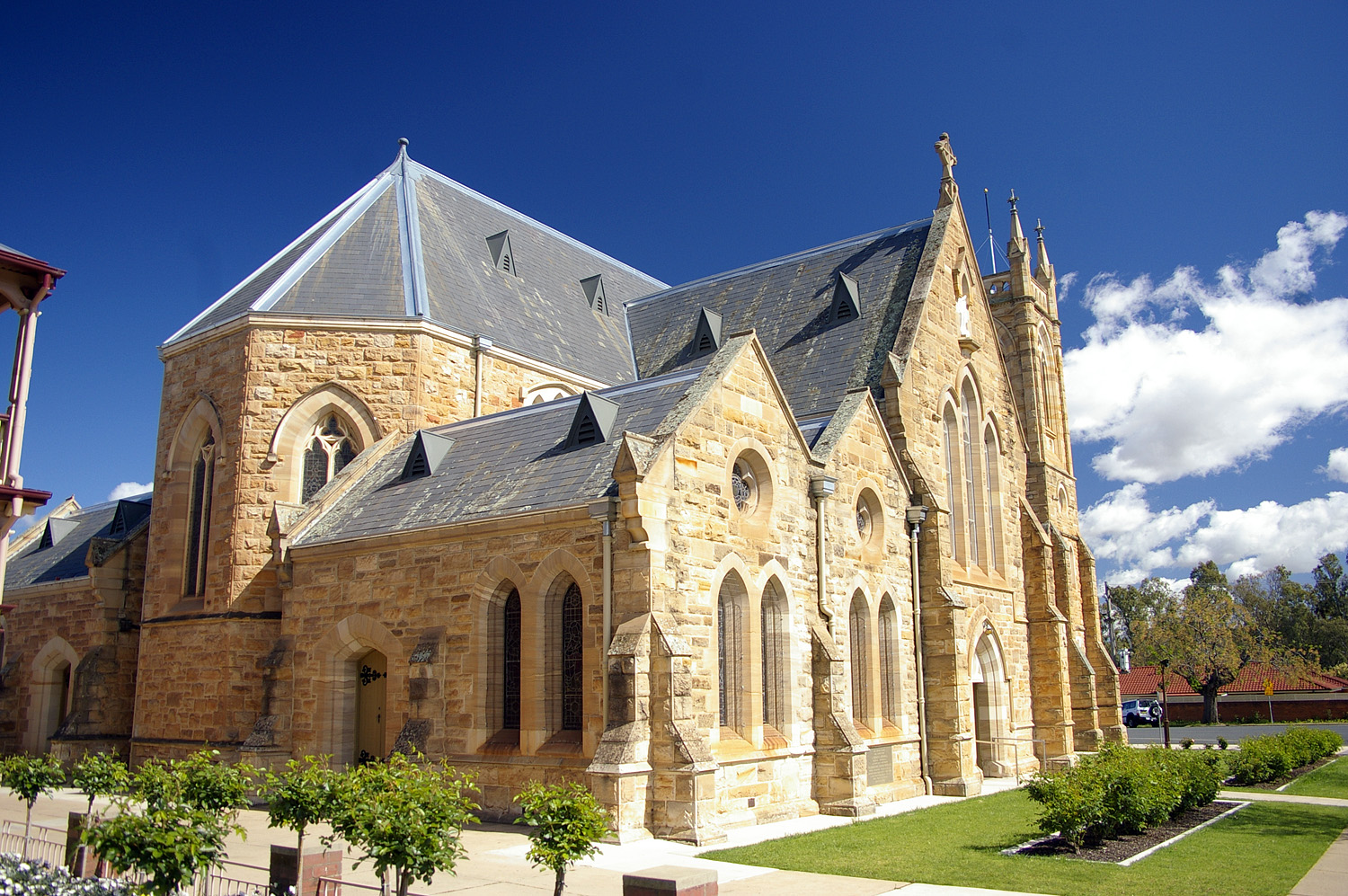
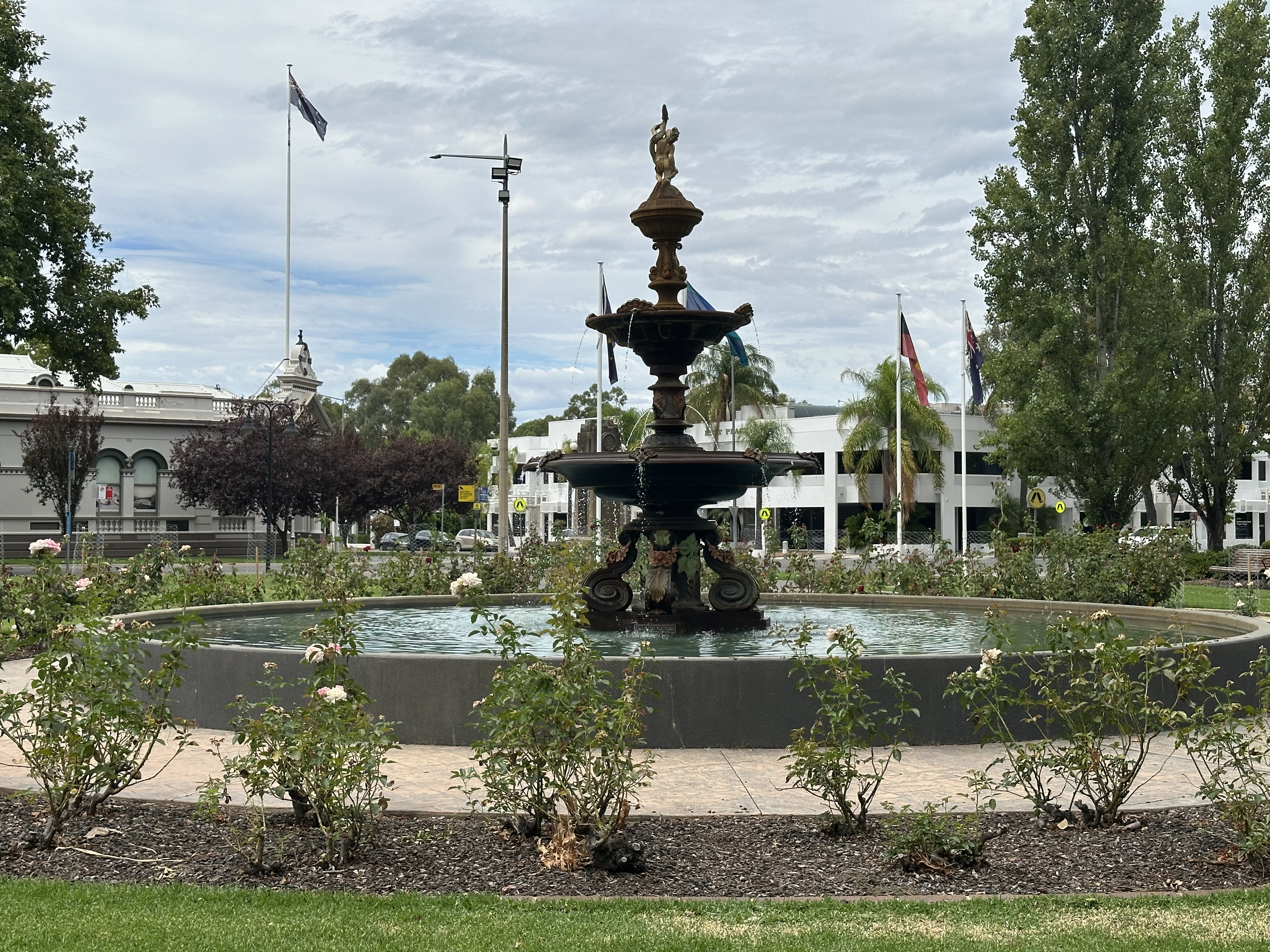
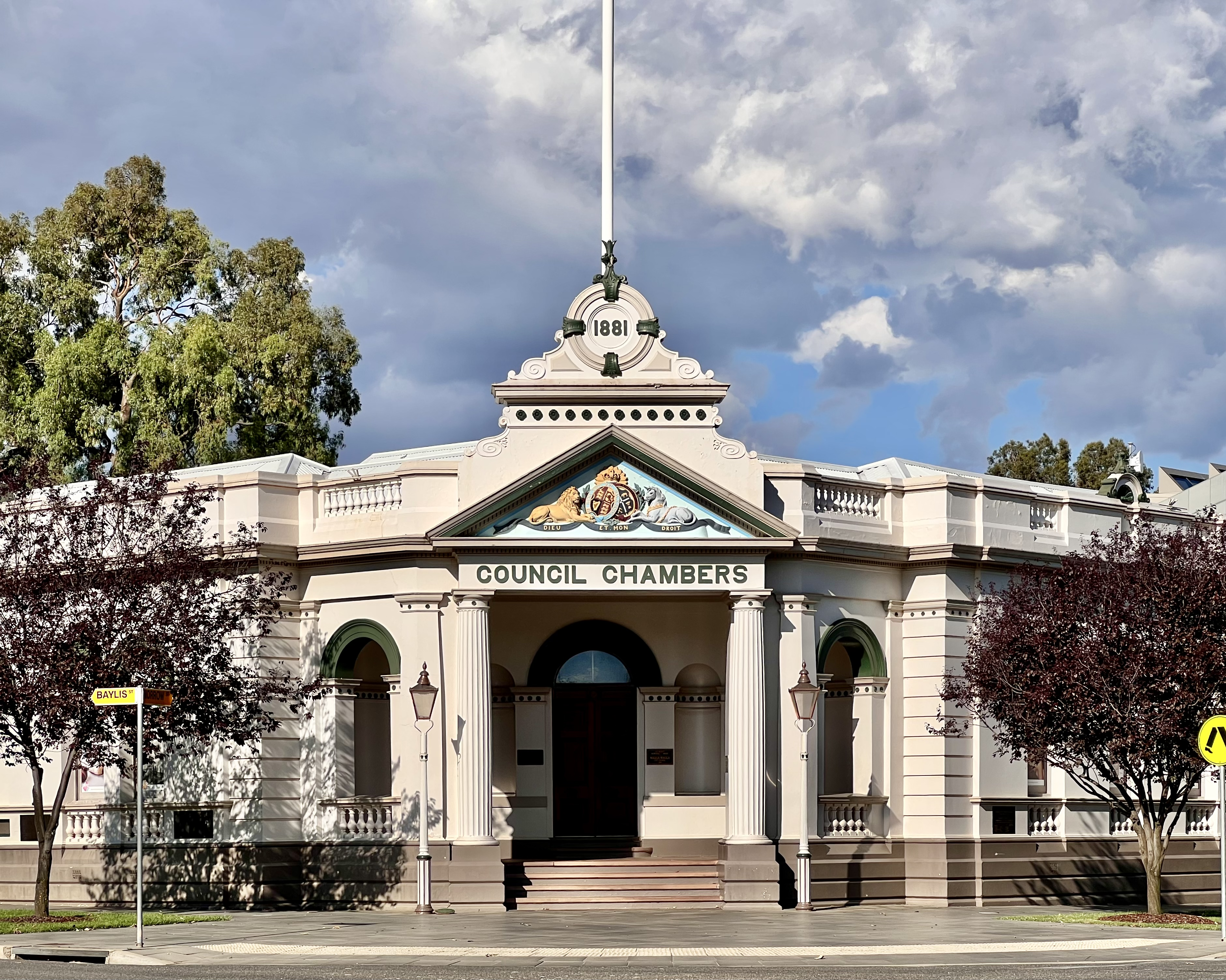
- Wagga Wagga City Centre St Michael's Cathedral The Chisholm Fountain A tunnel on the Willans Hill Miniature Railway Historic Council Chambers

- Coordinates: 35°7′8″S 147°22′8″E
- Country: Australia
- State: New South Wales
- LGA: City of Wagga Wagga
- Location: 452 km (281 mi) SW of Sydney; 456 km (283 mi) NE of Melbourne; 244 km (152 mi) W of Canberra; 147 km (91 mi) NNE of Albury; 27 km (17 mi) E of Collingullie
- Established: 1829 (explored); 1847 (village); 1849 (surveyed); 1849 (town); 1870 (municipality); 1946 (city)

Government
  - State electorate: Wagga Wagga
  - Federal division: Riverina
- Elevation: 180 m (590 ft)

Population
  - Total: 57,003 (2021) (26th)
- Time zone: UTC+10:00 (AEST)
  - Summer (DST): UTC+11:00 (AEDT)
- Postcode: 2650
- County: Wynyard; Clarendon
- Parish: South Wagga Wagga
- Mean max temp: 22.1 °C (71.8 °F)
- Mean min temp: 9.0 °C (48.2 °F)
- Annual rainfall: 573.4 mm (22.57 in)

Wagga Wagga (/ˌwɒɡə ˈwɒɡə/ WOGƏ; informally called Wagga) is a major regional city in the Riverina region of New South Wales, Australia. Straddling the Murrumbidgee River, with an urban population of more than 57,003 as of 2021, it is an important agricultural, military, and transport hub of Australia. The ninth largest inland city in Australia, Wagga Wagga is located midway between the two largest cities in Australia—Sydney and Melbourne—and is the major regional centre for the Riverina and South West Slopes regions.

The central business district is focused around the commercial and recreational grid bounded by Best and Tarcutta Streets and the Murrumbidgee River and the Sturt Highway. The main shopping street of Wagga is Baylis Street which becomes Fitzmaurice Street at the northern end. Wagga is accessible from Sydney via the Sturt and Hume Highways, Adelaide via the Sturt Highway and Albury and Melbourne via the Olympic Highway and Hume Highway. Wagga is in an alluvial valley and much of the city has a problem with urban salinity.

The original inhabitants of the Wagga Wagga region were the Wiradjuri people. In 1829, Charles Sturt became the first European explorer to visit the future site of the city. Squatters arrived soon after. The town, positioned on the site of a ford across the Murrumbidgee, was surveyed and gazetted as a village in 1849 and the town grew quickly after. In 1870, the town was gazetted as a municipality.

During the negotiations leading to the federation of the Australian colonies, Wagga Wagga was a contender for the site of the capital for the new nation. During World War I, the town was the starting point for the Kangaroo recruitment march. The Great Depression and the resulting hardship saw Wagga Wagga become the centre of a secession movement for the Riverina region. Wagga Wagga became a garrison town during World War II with the establishment of a military base at Kapooka and Royal Australian Air Force bases at Forest Hill and Uranquinty. After the war, Wagga Wagga was proclaimed as a city in 1946 and new suburbs were developed to the south of the city. In 1982, the city was amalgamated with the neighbouring Kyeamba and Mitchell Shires to form the City of Wagga Wagga local government area.

== Geography ==
Wagga Wagga is at the eastern end of the Riverina region where the slopes of the Great Dividing Range flatten and form the Riverina plain. Wagga straddles the Murrumbidgee River, one of the great rivers of the Murray–Darling basin, and the city centre is on the southern bank, protected by a levee from potential flooding.

Wagga sits halfway between the largest cities in Australia, being 452 kilometres southwest of Sydney and 456 kilometres northeast of Melbourne with the Sydney–Melbourne railway line passing through. The Sturt Highway, part of Australia's National Highway network, passes through Wagga on its way from Adelaide to its junction with the main Sydney–Melbourne route, the Hume Highway, a further 45 kilometres east.

This location astride some of Australia's major transport routes has made Wagga Wagga an important heavy truck depot for a number of companies, including Toll Group. Wagga Wagga itself is the major regional centre for the Riverina and for much of the South West Slopes regions, providing education, health and other services to a region extending as far as Griffith to the west, Cootamundra to the north and Tumut to the east.

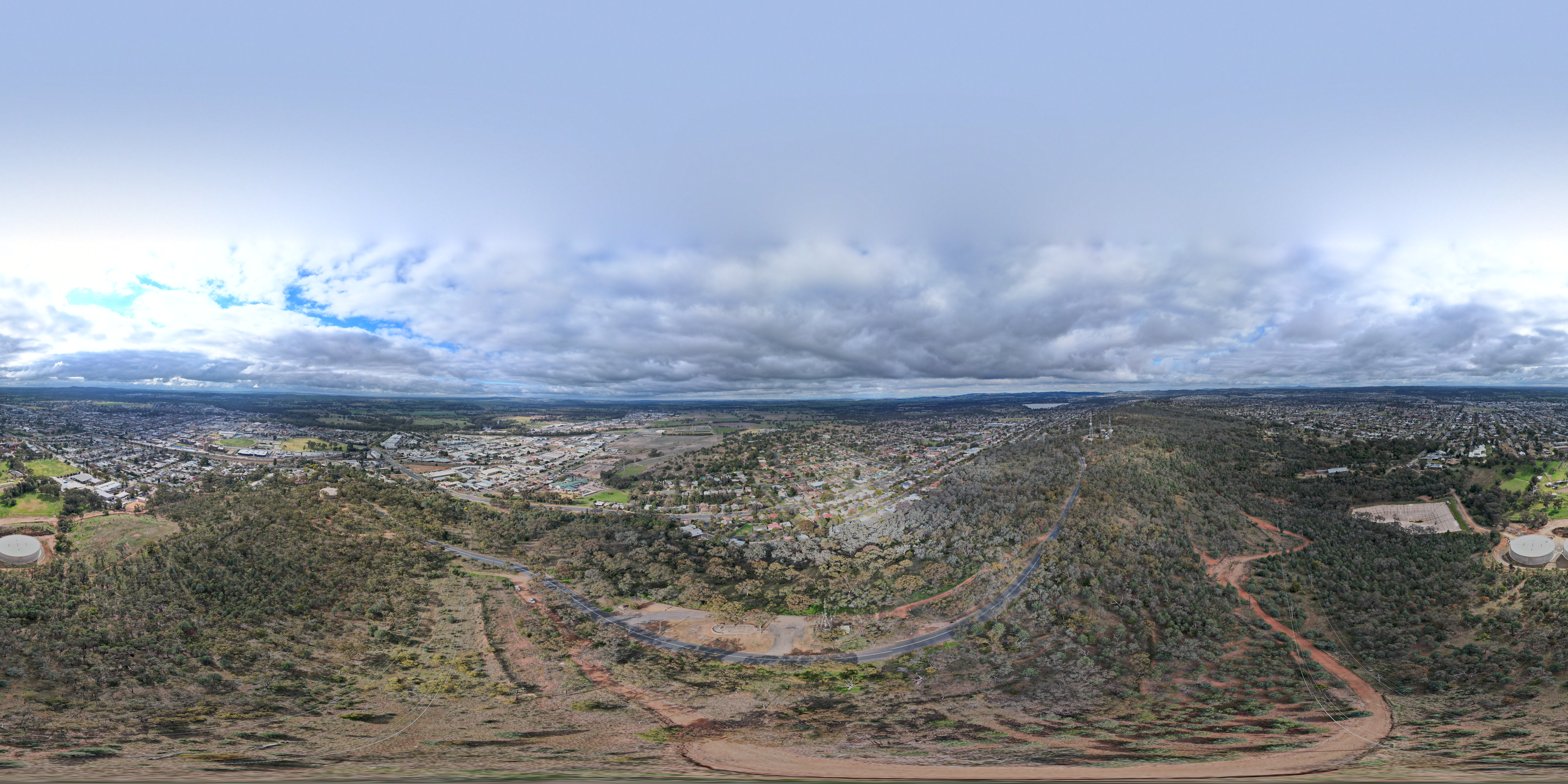
Wagga Wagga from Willans Hill

=== Landform and salinity ===
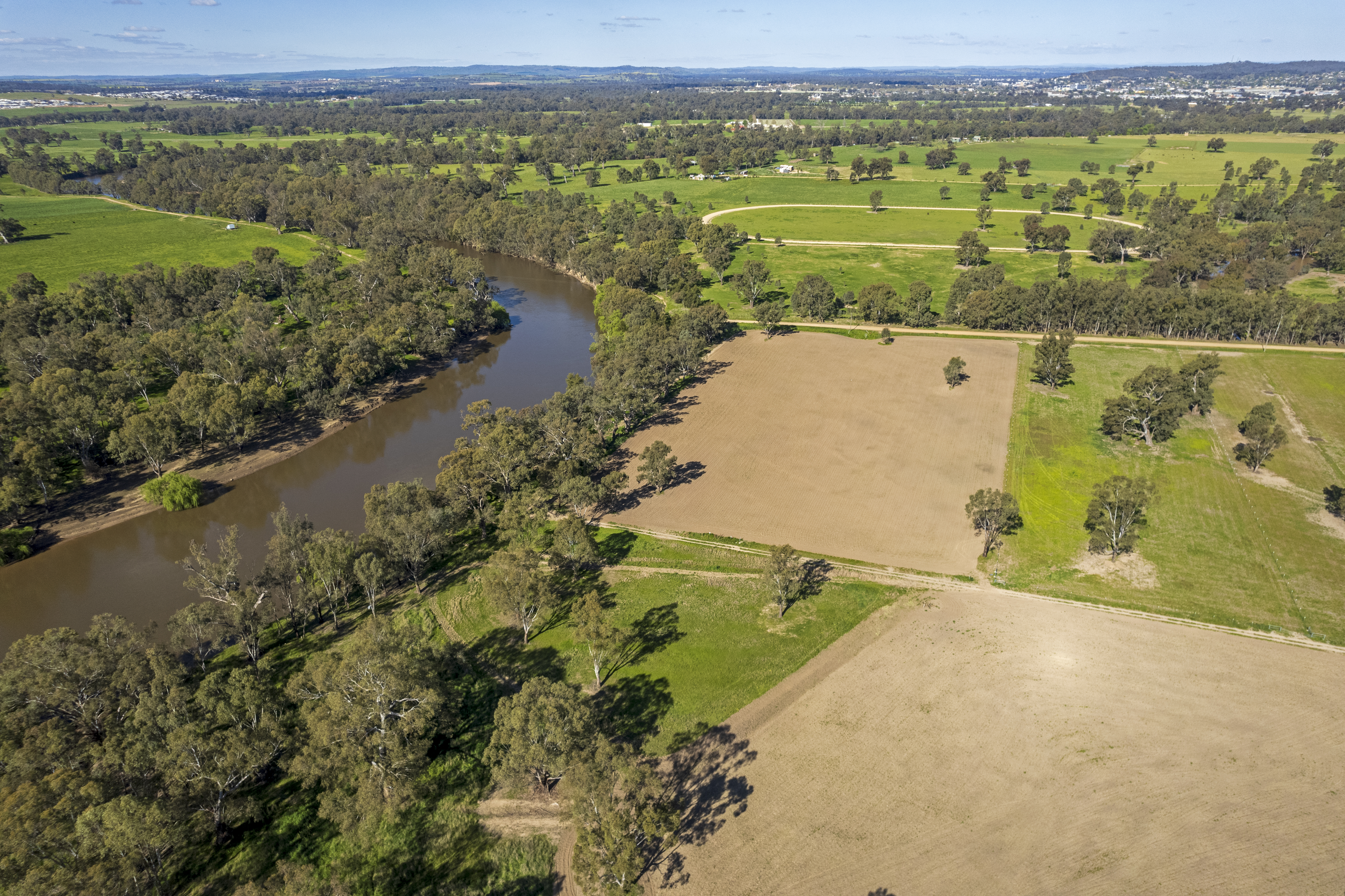
An aerial view of Ashmont Reserve and Moorong along the Murrumbidgee River, on the outskirts of the city

Wagga Wagga is upstream from the Riverina plain in the mid-catchment range of the Murrumbidgee River in an alluvial valley confined by low bedrock hills. Much of Wagga Wagga is on heavy clay soils in a large drainage basin with a small catchment discharge point. Groundwater therefore cannot leave easily, leading to Wagga Wagga having a problem with waterlogged soil and soil salination. Urban salination in Wagga Wagga is now the subject of a large multi-pronged approach to prevent further salination and reclaim salt-affected areas.

=== City and suburbs ===
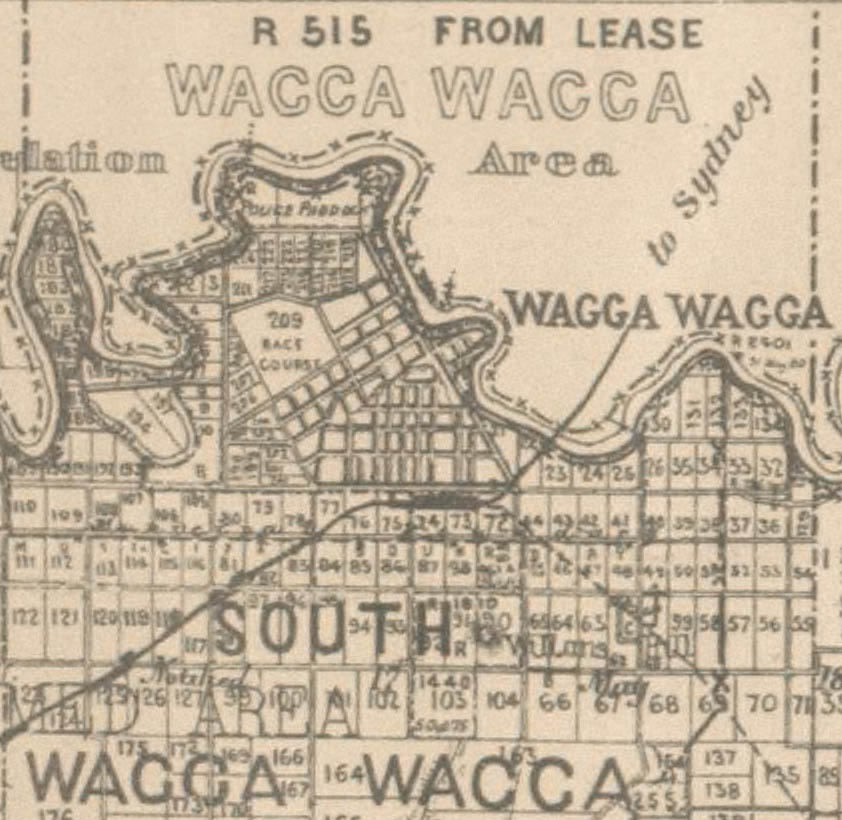
Wagga CBD in 1897

The location of Wagga Wagga's Central business district was already well established by the late 1800s and remains focused around the commercial and recreational grid bounded by Best and Tarcutta Streets and the Murrumbidgee River and the Sturt Highway. The main shopping street of Wagga Wagga is Baylis Street which becomes Fitzmaurice Street at the northern end. The Wollundry Lagoon is the water focus of the city centre and has been a key element in the development and separation of the north (older) and south (newer) parts of the city centre.

Most residential growth in Wagga Wagga has been on the higher ground to the south of the city centre, with the only residential areas north of the Murrumbidgee being the flood prone suburb of North Wagga Wagga and the university suburb of Estella. Major industrial areas of Wagga Wagga include the northern suburb of Bomen and the eastern suburb of East Wagga Wagga.

Thomas Mitchell, the surveyor who served under Lord Wellington, named many of the streets after Peninsular War veterans.

=== Climate ===
Wagga Wagga has a temperate climate with hot dry summers and cool to cold winters. Under the Köppen climate classification, the city has a humid subtropical climate (Cfa), with a semi-arid influence in its vegetation. At a latitude of 35 degrees and altitude of 212 metres (696 ft), Wagga Wagga has four distinct seasons.

Winters can be cold by Australian standards. The mean maximum temperature falls in July to 12.7 °C (54.9 °F) and a mean minimum of 2.8 °C (37.0 °F). The lowest temperature recorded at Wagga was −6.3 °C (20.7 °F) on 21 August 1982. The lowest maximum temperature was 3.4 °C (38.1 °F) on 16 July 1966. Fog and heavy frosts are common in the winter; while snow is now a very rare occurrence, with the last significant snowfall on 17 August 1970 (though with several occurrences prior to that year).

Summers in Wagga Wagga are hot and dry, with mean maximum temperatures ranging between 29 and 32 °C (84 and 90 °F). The highest temperature on record was 46.1 °C (115.0 °F) on 4 January 2020. Relative humidity is low in the summer months with a 3 pm average of around 30%. Wagga Wagga is considerably sunny with 124.3 clear days annually, averaging 8.1 sunshine hours daily or 2,961.5 hours annually (with the majority in the warmer months).

In 2009 the city recorded an anomalous maximum of 25.03 °C (77.05 °F), which was 2.33 °C (4.19 °F) above the country's average of 22.7 °C (72.9 °F) and the highest anomalous maximum in Australia for 2009. This preceded the early 2009 southeastern Australia heat wave, in which Wagga Wagga recorded 13 consecutive days over 38 °C (100 °F).

Wagga Wagga has a mean annual rainfall of 571.5 millimetres (22.50 in) per year. This rainfall is distributed fairly equally over the 12 months, with a slight peak in winter and spring. On 8 March 2010, Wagga Wagga Airport recorded 110.2 mm (4.34 in) of rain. This broke the previous all-time daily record of 104.1 mm (4.10 in) set on 16 March 1966, with 127 mm (5.0 in) of rain recorded at Gurwood Street in the city's CBD. In December 2010, the city recorded its wettest year on record and the first yearly rainfall recording of 1,000 mm (39 in).

Climate data for Wagga Wagga AMO (1941–2020); 212 m AMSL; 35.16° S, 147.46° E
Month	Jan	Feb	Mar	Apr	May	Jun	Jul	Aug	Sep	Oct	Nov	Dec	Year
Record high °C (°F)	46.1 (115.0)	45.2 (113.4)	39.9 (103.8)	35.8 (96.4)	28.7 (83.7)	23.2 (73.8)	23.2 (73.8)	26.6 (79.9)	32.9 (91.2)	36.3 (97.3)	42.8 (109.0)	43.2 (109.8)	46.1 (115.0)
Mean daily maximum °C (°F)	31.9 (89.4)	31.0 (87.8)	27.7 (81.9)	22.6 (72.7)	17.4 (63.3)	13.9 (57.0)	12.8 (55.0)	14.5 (58.1)	17.7 (63.9)	21.7 (71.1)	25.9 (78.6)	29.6 (85.3)	22.2 (72.0)
Mean daily minimum °C (°F)	16.4 (61.5)	16.4 (61.5)	13.5 (56.3)	9.2 (48.6)	5.9 (42.6)	3.7 (38.7)	2.8 (37.0)	3.5 (38.3)	5.1 (41.2)	7.8 (46.0)	10.9 (51.6)	14.0 (57.2)	9.1 (48.4)
Record low °C (°F)	3.4 (38.1)	2.3 (36.1)	2.6 (36.7)	−2.1 (28.2)	−4.4 (24.1)	−5.2 (22.6)	−6.3 (20.7)	−5.4 (22.3)	−3.8 (25.2)	−2.2 (28.0)	−0.2 (31.6)	3.4 (38.1)	−6.3 (20.7)
Average precipitation mm (inches)	40.1 (1.58)	40.2 (1.58)	44.6 (1.76)	39.7 (1.56)	50.6 (1.99)	50.4 (1.98)	54.1 (2.13)	50.7 (2.00)	48.8 (1.92)	55.8 (2.20)	46.5 (1.83)	46.1 (1.81)	571.5 (22.50)
Average precipitation days (≥ 0.2 mm)	5.5	5.3	5.6	6.7	9.2	11.3	13.6	12.9	10.4	9.3	7.5	6.3	103.6
Average afternoon relative humidity (%)	29	33	35	43	56	64	65	59	54	46	36	30	46
Mean monthly sunshine hours	334.8	285.3	288.3	246.0	195.3	138.0	148.8	198.4	228.0	285.2	291.0	322.4	2,961.5
Mean daily sunshine hours	10.8	10.1	9.3	8.2	6.3	4.6	4.8	6.4	7.6	9.2	9.7	10.4	8.1

== History ==
=== European settlement ===
The original inhabitants of the Wagga Wagga region, who maintain a relationship with the area to this day, are the Wiradjuri people and the word wagga in the Wiradjuri language was thought to mean 'crow', so wagga wagga could be taken to mean 'the place of many crows'. Other interpretations had wagga to mean 'reeling' (a sick man or a dizzy man); 'to dance, slide or grind'. In August 2019, the City of Wagga Wagga dropped the definition 'crow' and adopted the city's Aboriginal meaning as 'dance and celebrations'. The new meaning was officially enshrined in the city's first Reconciliation Action Plan.

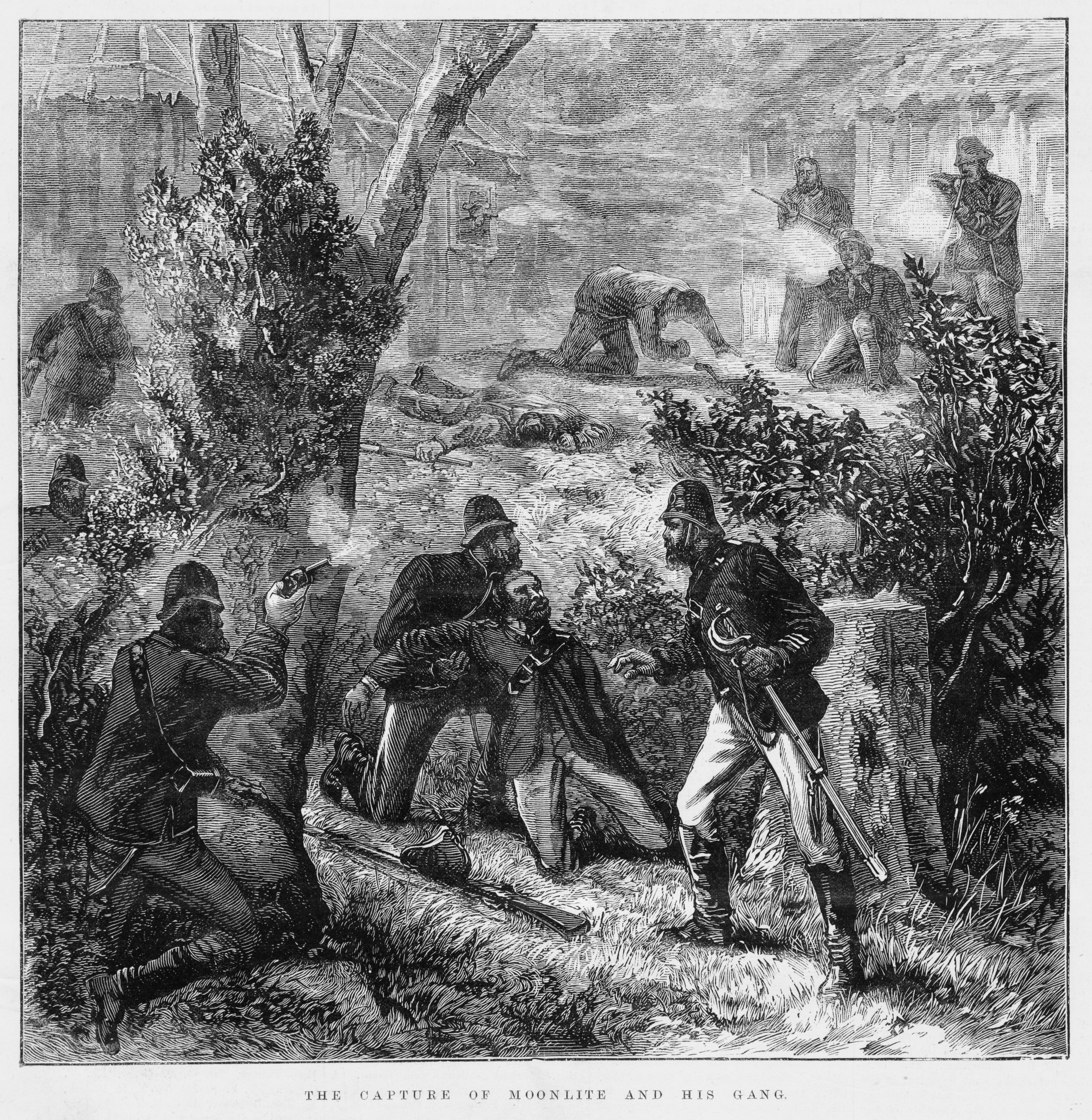
The capture of Captain Moonlite

European exploration of the future site of Wagga Wagga began in 1829 with the arrival of Captain Charles Sturt during his expedition along the Murrumbidgee River. Settlers arrived shortly thereafter with Charles Tompson establishing the Eunonyhareenyha 'run' in 1832 on the north bank of the river, and also in 1832 the Wagga Wagga 'run' established by Robert Holt Best (died September 1853), on the south bank. Other settlers followed, all squatting illegally, but by 1836 the colonial government regulated the tenure of land and established a licensing scheme. Within a few years settlers' numbers increased greatly and before 1850 a local bench of magistrates and a place for holding petty sessions was established. The beginnings of a village formed near the ford used by most traffic passing through the area and included a crude blacksmith's shop, a hotel, and a post office. By 1849 the town was marked out by surveyor Thomas Scott Townsend and formally gazetted as a village.

Wagga Wagga grew quickly, reaching a population of 627 in 1861 and during that decade a number of hotels and stores opened, as well as professional services in the form of banks, solicitors, doctors and dentists. The Wagga Wagga Advertiser (today's Daily Advertiser) commenced publication in 1868. Until the 1860s most goods were transported to markets by bullock wagon. For a short time, the arrival of faster, cheaper and more reliable riverboats allowed goods to be transported more easily to export markets. The riverboat era ended when the New South Wales government extended the railway line to North Wagga Wagga in 1878 and across the river to Wagga Wagga itself in 1881.

As in most rural towns Chinese people made a significant contribution as storekeeper, scrub clearers and in other occupations. As observed in 1879: "Chinamen seem to pervade everywhere. It is evident that the yellow agony doesn't annoy the good folks of Wagga Wagga much. Chinese cooks, Chinese 'boots' Chinese labourers, Chinese servants are everywhere. [...] Most of the 'ringing' on the surrounding runs and selections is in the hands of Chinamen, who, be it noted, have so far advanced in the civilisation of the west as to understand fully the advantage of a fair day's pay for a fair day's work. Chinese cheap labour is unknown here. The Celestial business establishments seem well patronised by Europeans as well as by their compatriots."

On 15 March 1870, Wagga Wagga was incorporated as a municipality and George Forsyth was chosen as the first mayor of Wagga Wagga. Gas lighting was installed throughout the streets of Wagga Wagga in 1881, although once again North Wagga Wagga was neglected. By 1885, a town waterworks and reservoir was established although water quality remained a problem. Poor sanitation caused a horrific stench in the town and was blamed for a large increase in infectious diseases such as typhoid fever in the 1890s and early 1900s. In 1908 the council approved a sewerage scheme and by 1914 most of the main streets were sewered. A free public library was opened in 1875 and the council began to establish parklands such as Bolton Park and the Town Hall Gardens.

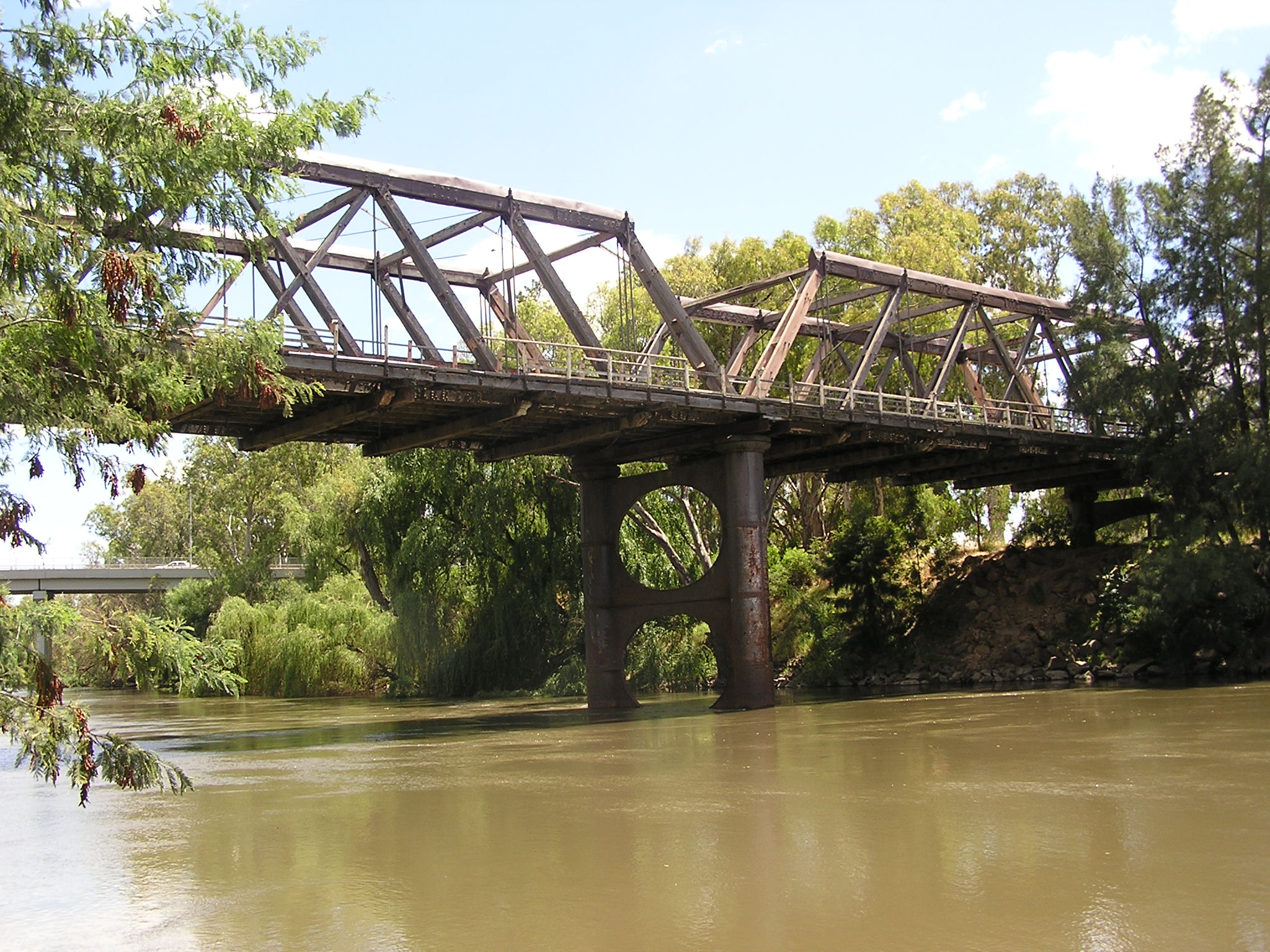
Hampden Bridge

In September 1859 local residents formed a committee for the construction of a pile bridge over the Murrumbidgee River. After the New South Wales Government refused to support this type of bridge the committee decided to finance it themselves. The bridge was completed in October 1862 and opened on 27 October at just over 91 metres long and 7 metres wide. In 1884 the New South Wales Government purchased the bridge and it was demolished in 1895. In 1895 a truss bridge called the Hampden Bridge, was built across the Murrumbidgee River at Wagga. The bridge served the Wagga Wagga community for over 100 years until 16 August 2006 when it was closed and fenced off to the public due to the bridge being declared a safety risk after one of the trusses failed. In 2014 the Hampden Bridge was demolished.

With its increasing prosperity and population, Wagga Wagga and the surrounding district became a place of interest to several infamous bushrangers. The Wagga police magistrate Henry Baylis was bailed up by Mad Dog Morgan in 1863. Captain Moonlite and his band arrived in the district on 15 November 1879 and held up 39 people at Wantabadgery Station. Moonlite and his gang escaped a police pursuit only to be captured at another nearby property when police from the neighbouring townships of Gundagai and Adelong arrived.

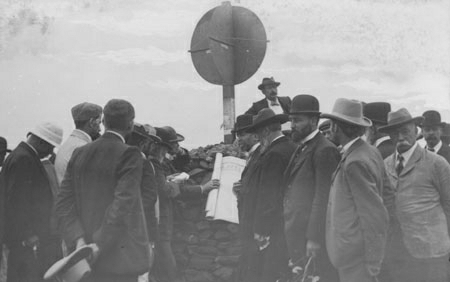
Federal parliamentarians visiting a proposed site for the Federal Capital of Australia in Wagga Wagga

Along with most of the Riverina region, the majority of Wagga Wagga residents supported the federation of the Australian colonies, in large part due to the prospect of free trade across colonial borders. In 1898, a group of residents promoted Wagga Wagga for consideration as the site of the future national capital due to its location equidistant from Sydney and Melbourne and its ample water supply. Despite the bid's lack of success, in the 1899 referendum Wagga Wagga residents voted strongly in favour of federation.

During World War I the town was the starting point of the "Kangaroo March", one of a series of snowball marches conducted in New South Wales during the war in which groups of recruits marched towards Sydney and appealed to men in the towns along the route to join them and enlist in the Australian Imperial Force. 88 recruits left Wagga Wagga on 1 December 1915, farewelled by a large crowd and to the accompaniment of a band. The marchers included John Ryan, who later won the Victoria Cross for his actions in the Battle of the Hindenburg Line in 1918. The march finished at Campbelltown with over 220 recruits.

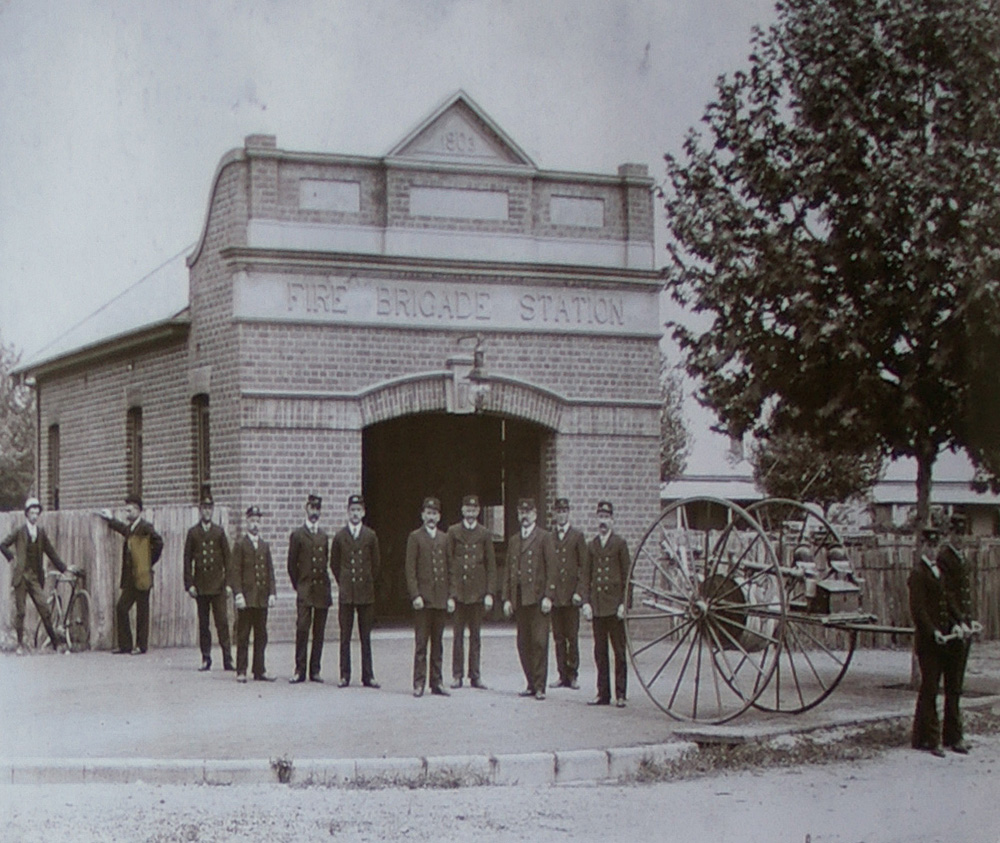
Wagga Wagga Fire Station (C. 1903) on Morrow Street in 1912

After the war some of the area around Wagga Wagga was designated for settlement by returned soldiers, who faced insurmountable difficulties due to poor and unwatered land, lack of farming experience and lack of access to markets. Many walked off the land after years of backbreaking work. Residential growth continued with a population in 1921 of 11,631. Much of this residential growth was housed in the higher ground to the south, extending to the south of the railway tracks. A suburb consisting of tents and crude huts, known as "Tent Town", developed along the river providing housing for the poorer residents of Wagga Wagga. In 1922, electricity was provided for the town, with hydro-electric power available from Burrinjuck Dam from 1928.

Hardship as a result of the Great Depression, and the election of Jack Lang of the Labor party as Premier of New South Wales, sparked the formation of the "Riverina Movement". Throughout the Riverina in early 1931, a series of rallies were organised by the movement, culminating in a great meeting in Wagga Wagga on 28 February 1931. The meeting called on the State and Federal governments to alleviate the concerns of producers in the district or hold a referendum to determine if the Riverina should secede. The movement petered out following the dismissal of Lang in 1932 and the recovery of the regional economy.

The outbreak of World War II saw Royal Australian Air Force bases established at Forest Hill in 1940 and Uranquinty in 1941. A major Australian Army camp was constructed at Kapooka in 1942 and one year later there were 8,000 troops in training there with Wagga taking on the characteristics of a garrison town.

After the war, Wagga Wagga grew steadily and was proclaimed a city on 17 April 1946. Suburbs such as Turvey Park and Kooringal were developed to the south of the city and in the 1960s, residential growth expanded to cover areas such as Tolland and Lake Albert. The main commercial district also moved south to the Baylis Street end with the development of the Sturt Mall in 1979. The City Council developed a series of industrial areas including areas for service and general industries, and agricultural processing and noxious industries were established in a new industrial estate in Bomen.

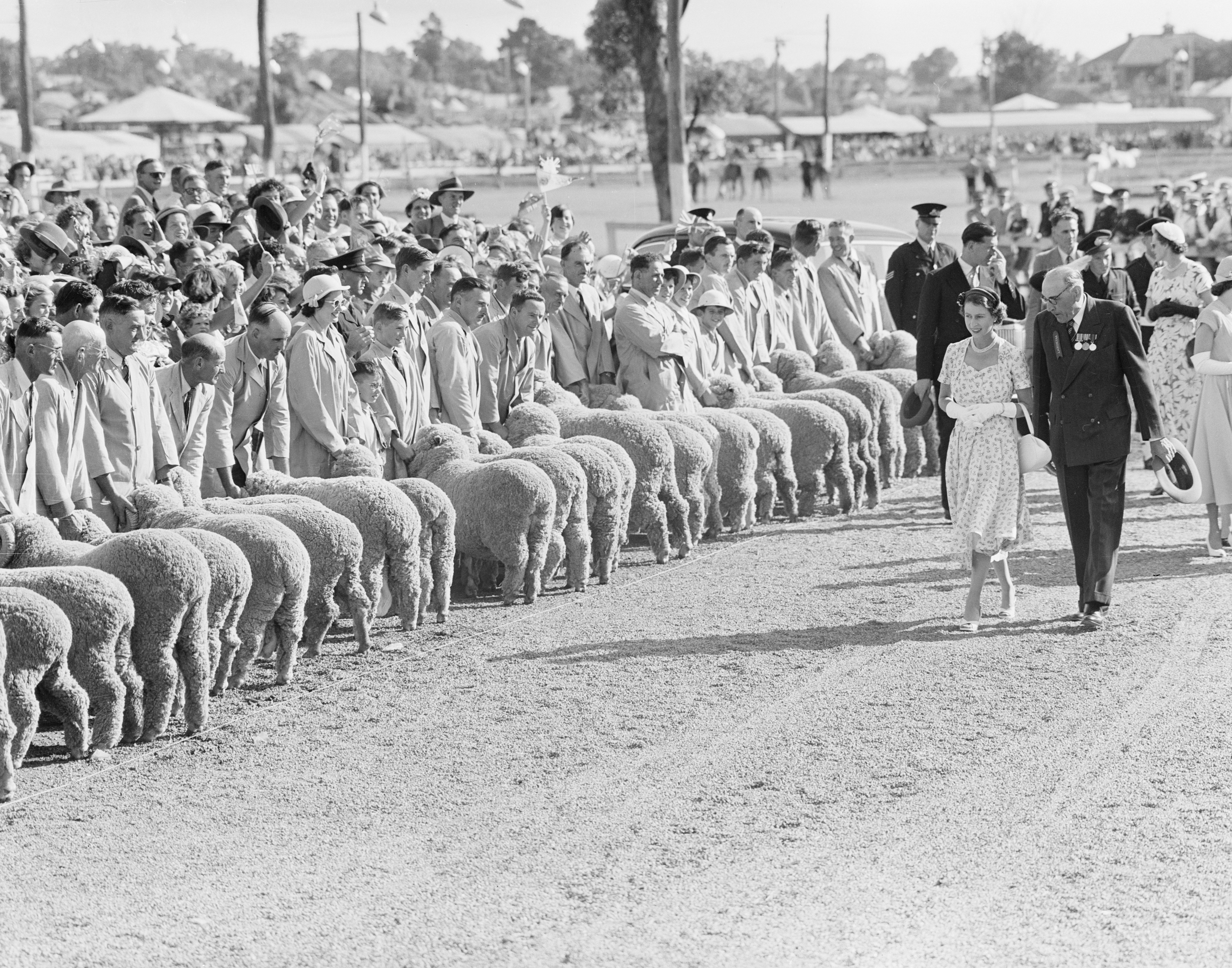
Queen Elizabeth II being shown sheep at the Wagga Wagga show, 1954

In the 1950s the defence bases in Wagga Wagga again became an important part of the city. The Army camp at Kapooka was reopened as a recruit training centre from 1951, a role it maintains to this day. RAAF Base Wagga at Forest Hill also expanded, with training of defence force aircraft technicians there from 1969. After a series of major floods in the early 1950s, the City Council protected the city area on the south flood plain through construction of a levee, completed in 1962. The levee was designed to provide protection from floods at levels expected once every one hundred years. North Wagga Wagga was initially excluded from protection however by 1982 another levee was constructed to protect the village, although at a lower standard.

In 1971, following pressure from the Wagga Wagga community for a university, the teachers' college established in 1947 became the Riverina College of Advanced Education and was relocated to a site adjacent to the Wagga Agricultural College, with which it amalgamated in 1975. In 1989, the college amalgamated with the College of Advanced Education at Bathurst to become Charles Sturt University. In 1981, the New South Wales government forced the amalgamation of Wagga Wagga City Council with neighbouring Kyeamba Shire and Mitchell Shire to form the new City of Wagga Wagga local government area, containing 4,886 square kilometres.

In February 1993, Wagga Wagga was the first city in the world to be proclaimed as a Rotary Peace City, with a Rotary Peace Monument unveiled on the corner of The Esplanade and Best Street.

== Heritage listings ==
Wagga Wagga has a number of heritage-listed sites, including:

- Botanic Gardens Site (BGS), Baden Powell Drive: Mobile Cook's Galley, Museum of the Riverina
- Main Southern railway: Wagga Wagga railway station

== Symbols ==
=== Flag ===
The Wagga Wagga city flag was designed by H Ellis Tomlinson and adopted in 1965. Wagga Wagga City Council holds the copyright to Tomlinson's design. The flag is officially square and takes its design from the shield of the city's coat of arms.

=== Coat of arms ===
The upper quarter of the shield contains eight stalks of wheat positioned to form two capital letters W on a vert (green) field. The lower quarter of the upper half of the flag contains a wavy blue line on gold (yellow) representing the river winding through the wheat fields. The lower half of the flag contains the head of a ram positioned centrally on a vert (green) field.

The crest has a gold (yellow) mural crown on a knight's helmet. Inside the mural crown are a yellow caduceus with black wings, and eight gum leaves arranged as two letters W.

Both the supporters are crows, each with a gold (yellow) collar in the shape of the letter W.

The base of the coat of arms is grassy with a river in between, indicating that Wagga Wagga is built on both sides of the river.

Coat of arms of the City of Wagga Wagga
Adopted 1965 Crest Mural crown with caduceus and leaves arranged as two W's Escutcheon Wheat arranged as two W's, a river, and a ram's head Supporters Crows Compartment Grassy green field with river Motto Forward in Faith

=== Crows ===
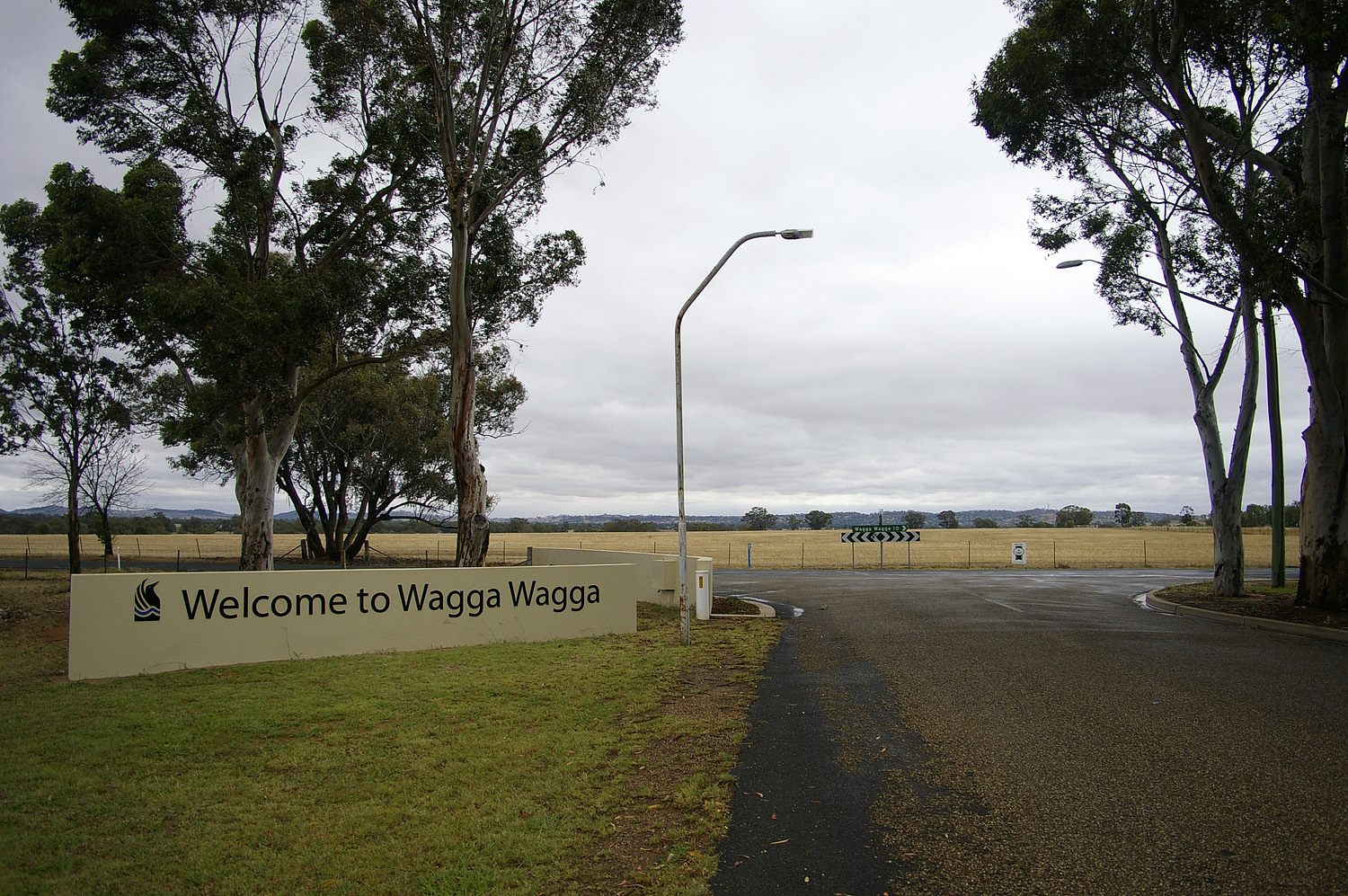
The Wagga Wagga City Council logo features a crow and river, and it can be seen on this sign

Crows are considered a symbol of the city of Wagga Wagga, appearing in the council's logo, coat of arms, and throughout branding of local businesses, as well as in public artwork. This is due to the debated interpretation of 'Wagga Wagga' being derived from a Wiradjuri language term meaning 'place of many crows'.

Since 2019, the Wagga Wagga City Council has recognised this meaning as incorrect, instead adopting "many dances and celebrations", which was supported by Wiradjuri elder Stan Grant. Crows remain a ubiquitous civic symbol of Wagga Wagga. Both the council and ABC Riverina have promoted the use of the barking marsh frog as an alternative animal emblem for the city, originally suggested by Canberra resident Dec Browne.

== Demographics ==
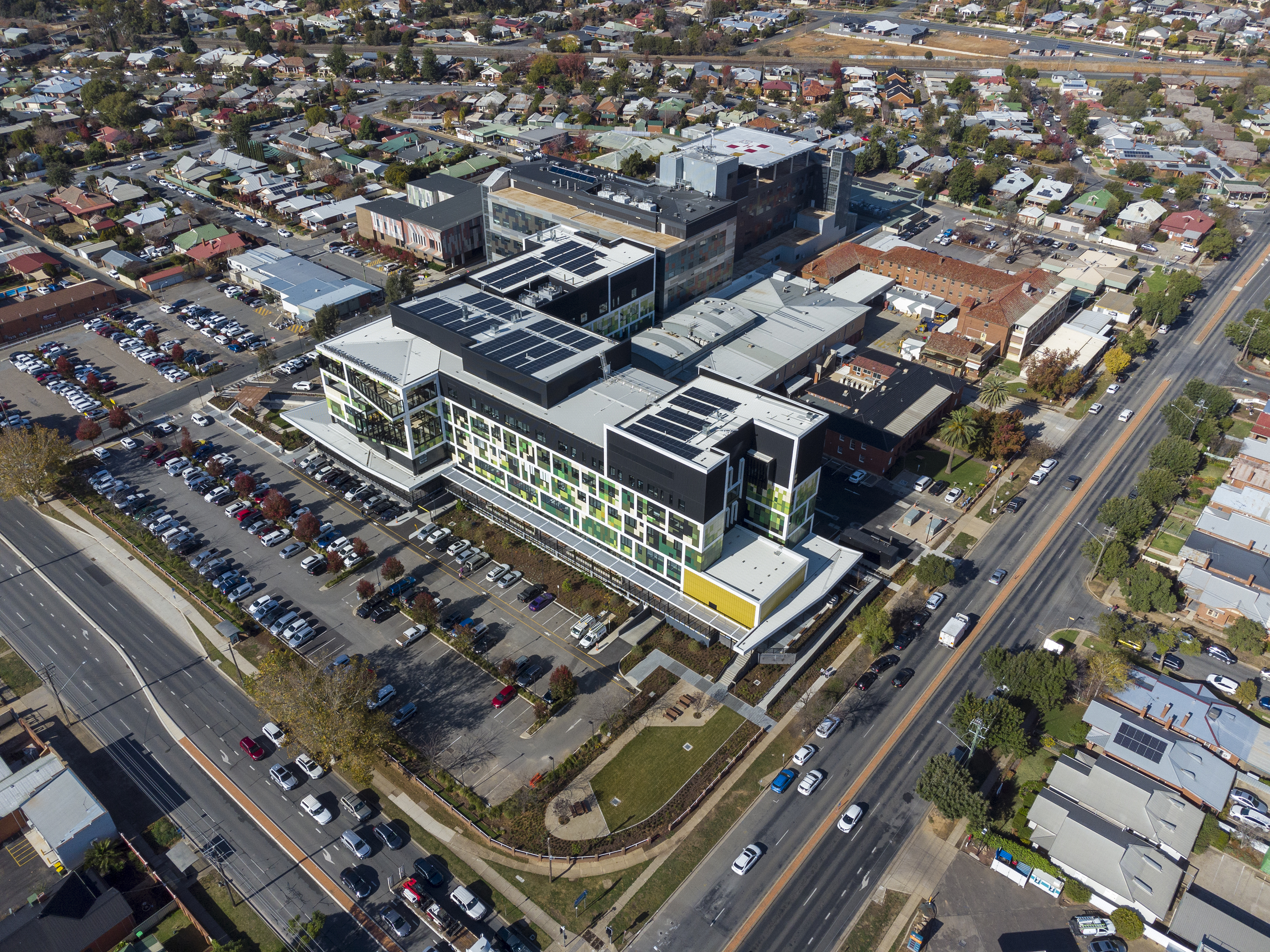
The Wagga Wagga Base Hospital is the primary medical care provider for the wider population of the Riverina region

Wagga Wagga is the major city of the Riverina and the second largest inland city in New South Wales after Maitland, In 2021 the urban area of Wagga Wagga was home to 57,003 people. Wagga had grown, on average, 0.65 percent year-on-year during the previous five years. Much of this growth is attributable to the "sponge city" phenomenon as Wagga Wagga attracts residents from smaller towns in the region such as Urana. Other factors include Wagga's role as a regional centre and its hosting of major defence establishments and a Charles Sturt University campus.

In the 2021 census, there were 57,003 people in the Wagga Wagga Urban Area.

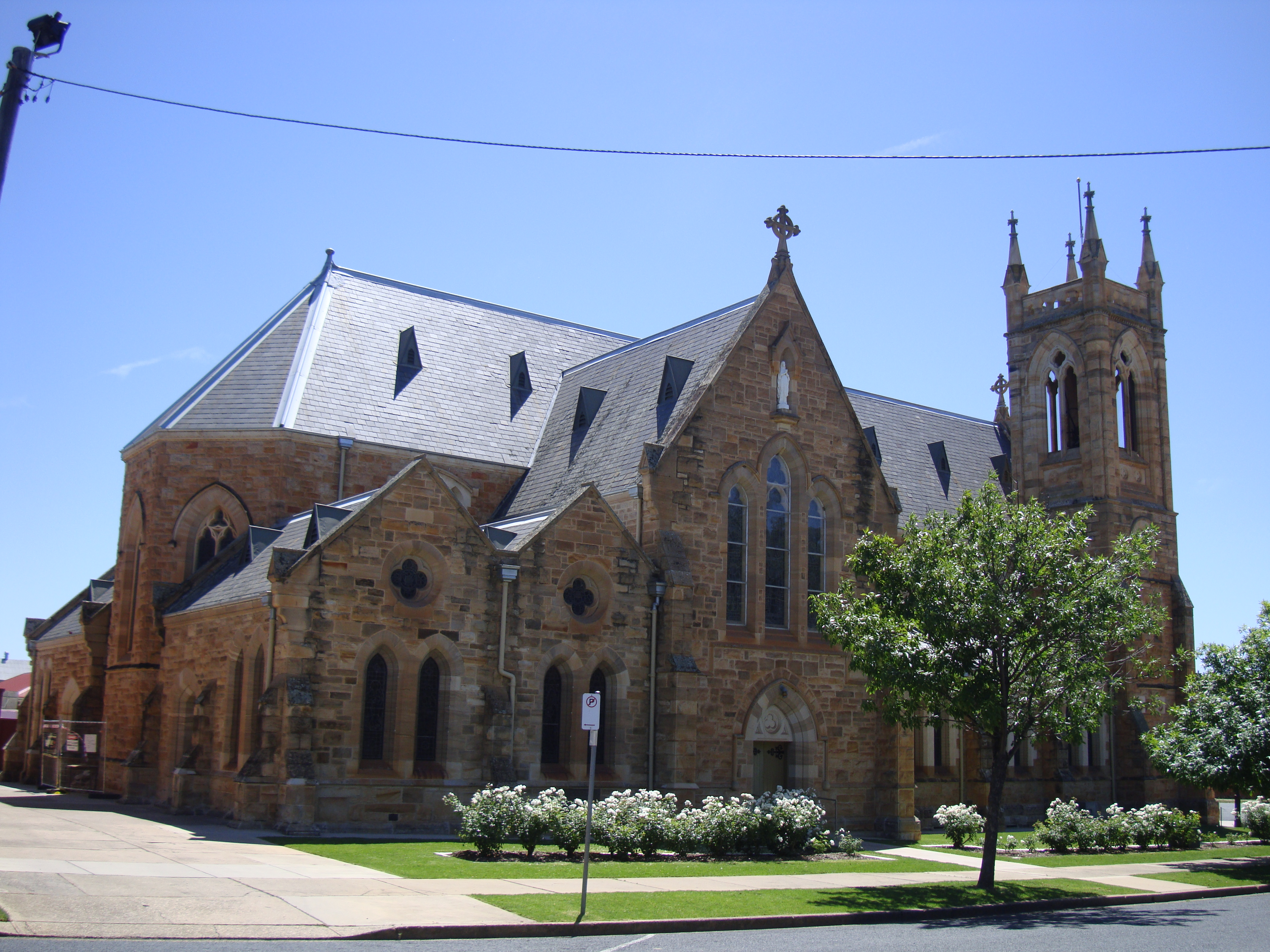
St Michael's Cathedral is the seat of the Catholic Diocese of Wagga Wagga

- Aboriginal and Torres Strait Islander people made up 7% of the population.
- 82.9% of people were born in Australia. The next most common countries of birth were India 1.5%, Iraq 1.4%, England 1.2% and New Zealand and Philippines both 0.7%.
- 85.2% of people spoke only English at home. Other languages spoken at home included Kurdish 1.2%, Malayalam 0.8%, Mandarin 0.6%, Arabic 0.5%, and Punjabi 0.4%.
- The most common responses for religion were No Religion 31.2%, Catholic 27.4%, Anglican 15.3%, Not stated 5.9% and Presbyterian and Reformed 3.7%.

Historical population
Year	Pop.	±%
1921	7,679	—
1933	11,631	+51.5%
1947	15,340	+31.9%
1954	19,235	+25.4%
1961	22,092	+14.9%
1966	24,904	+12.7%
1971	27,719	+11.3%
1976	32,984	+19.0%
1981	36,837	+11.7%
1986	37,577	+2.0%
1991	40,875	+8.8%
1996	42,848	+4.8%
2001	44,272	+3.3%
2006	46,735	+5.6%
2011	46,913	+0.4%
2016	48,263	+2.9%
2021	49,686	+2.9%
Source: Australian Bureau of Statistics data.

Wagga is home to approximately 39% of Australia's Yazidi population.

Wagga Wagga falls within the boundary of the Anglican Diocese of Canberra and Goulburn. Anglican parishes include St John's, Wagga Wagga (Church St); St Paul's, Turvey Park (Fernleigh Rd); St Alban's, Kooringal (Lake Albert Rd); Community of the Redeemer, Ashmont (Blakemore Ave).

Wagga Wagga is the seat of a Roman Catholic diocese, with its principal church being St Michael's Cathedral.

== Economy ==
=== Commercial ===
Baylis Street is a major commercial and retail strip in Wagga Wagga

Wagga attracts people from all over the Riverina and southwestern New South Wales to its shopping facilities. It is the major support city for over 200,000 people who live across the region.

Wagga's shopping centres include two notable centres of metropolitan standards, Wagga Wagga Marketplace and Sturt Mall in the central business district, and suburban shopping centres such as the South City Shopping Centre in Glenfield Park, the Lake Village Shopping Centre, Lake Albert, the Tolland Shopping Centre and Kooringal Mall in Kooringal. Wagga has a large HomeBase store located on the Sturt Highway.

Wagga's central business district, with both Baylis and Fitzmaurice Streets and other surrounding streets, offers hundreds of speciality retailers including national chains such as Big W, Myer and Kmart. Target Country closed its store on Baylis Street in March 2021. The dairy company Fonterra (formerly Murrumbidgee Dairy Products), is based on the Sturt Highway, and is a supplier of dairy products in the Riverina, Other major industries include Cargill and Heinz, which are in the suburb of Bomen.

=== Defence forces ===
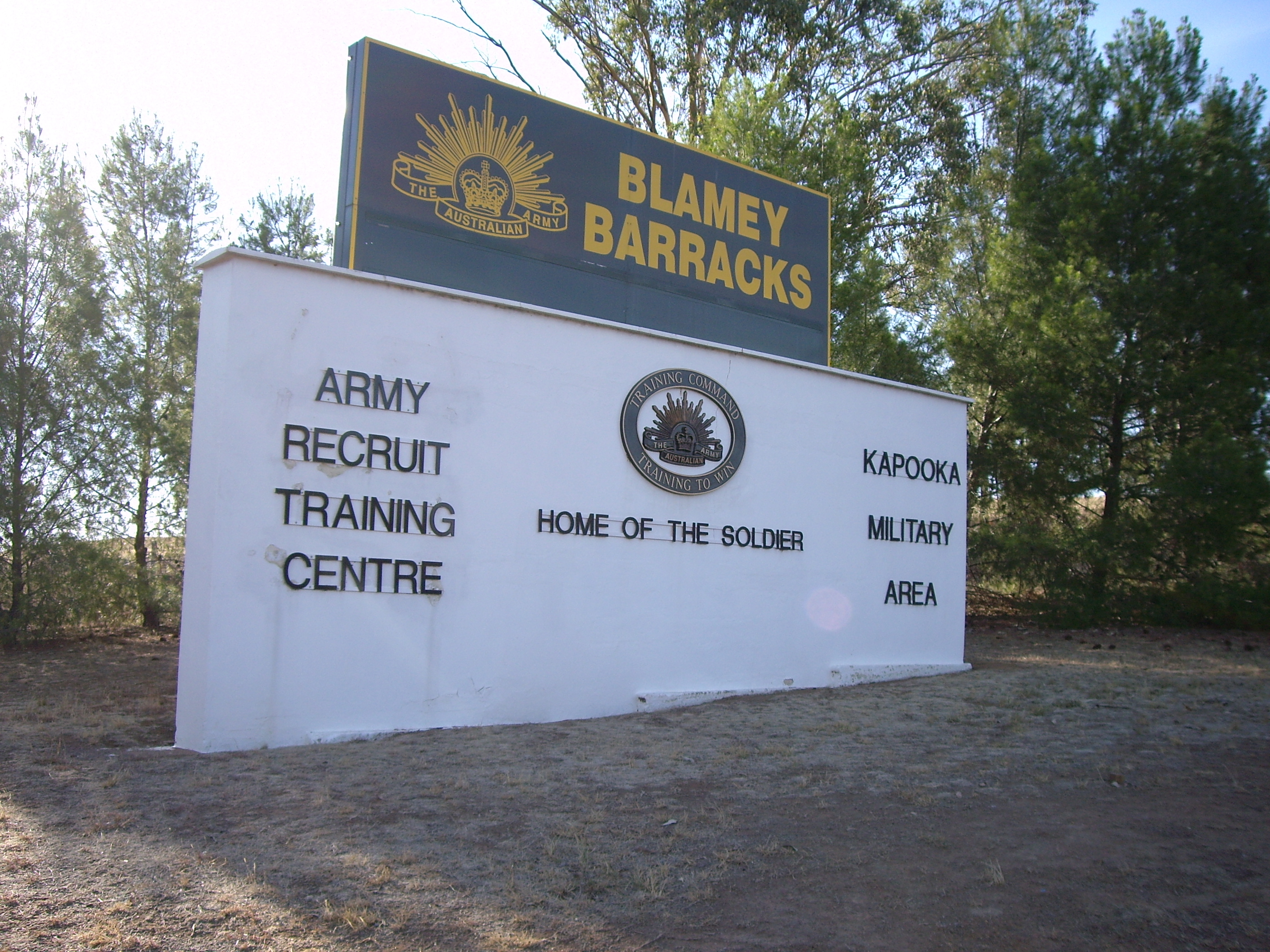
Army Recruit Training Centre

The Australian Army base at Kapooka includes the Army Recruit Training Centre, where general enlistment members of the Australian Army undertake their initial training. The barracks at Kapooka are named after World War II military commander Sir Thomas Blamey, born at Lake Albert Wagga Wagga and Australia's only Field Marshal. Following recruit training, soldiers move on to take specific training at training establishments throughout Australia. The soldiers club at Kapooka is named for John Hurst Edmondson, Australia's first Victoria Cross winner in World War II, who was born in Wagga Wagga.

There is a separate Royal Australian Air Force (RAAF) base at Forest Hill, RAAF Base Wagga, which is the administration and logistics training base for Air Force personnel and the tri-service (RAN/Army/RAAF) electronic (White hander) and aircraft (Black hander) trades school. Some Royal Australian Navy Aircraft Technicians assigned to the naval air station HMAS Albatross are based at RAAF Base Wagga as an Aircraft Maintenance and Flight Trials Unit (AMAFTU). As of 2008, No 1 Recruit Training Unit (1RTU) has moved from RAAF Edinburgh to RAAF Wagga Wagga. RAAF Base Wagga is also the home of the Wagga Wagga RAAF Museum.

=== Education ===
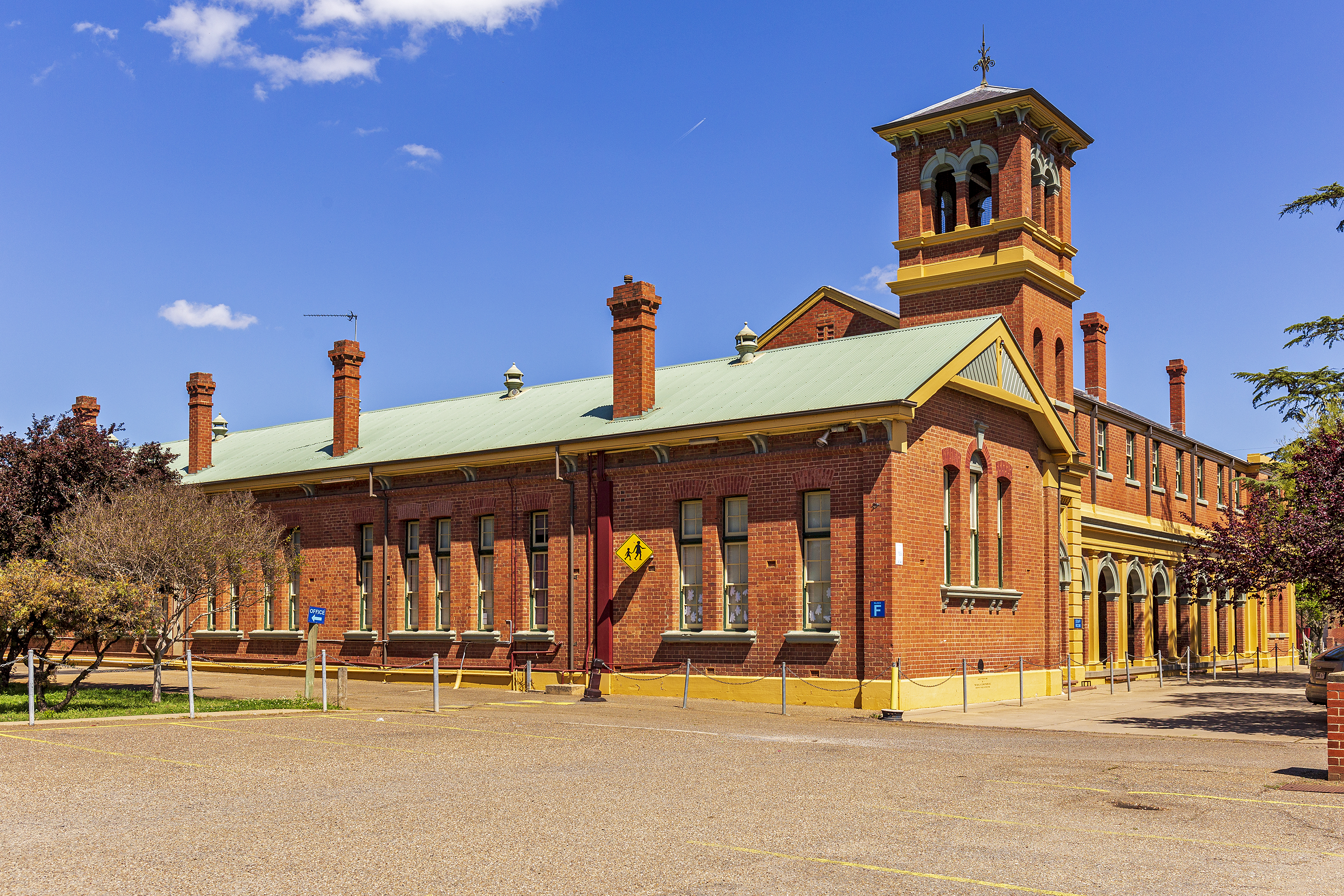
South Wagga Public School

The sole provider of higher education in Wagga Wagga is the local campus of the multi-campus Charles Sturt University, located on the outskirts of the suburb of Estella. The university was established on 1 July 1989 following the enactment of The Charles Sturt University Act, 1989 and involved the merger of several existing separately-administered Colleges of Advanced Education including the Riverina College of Advanced Education in Wagga Wagga. At the time of its establishment it became the ninth university in the state and its inaugural vice-chancellor was C.D. Blake AO who at the time was the principal of the Riverina College.

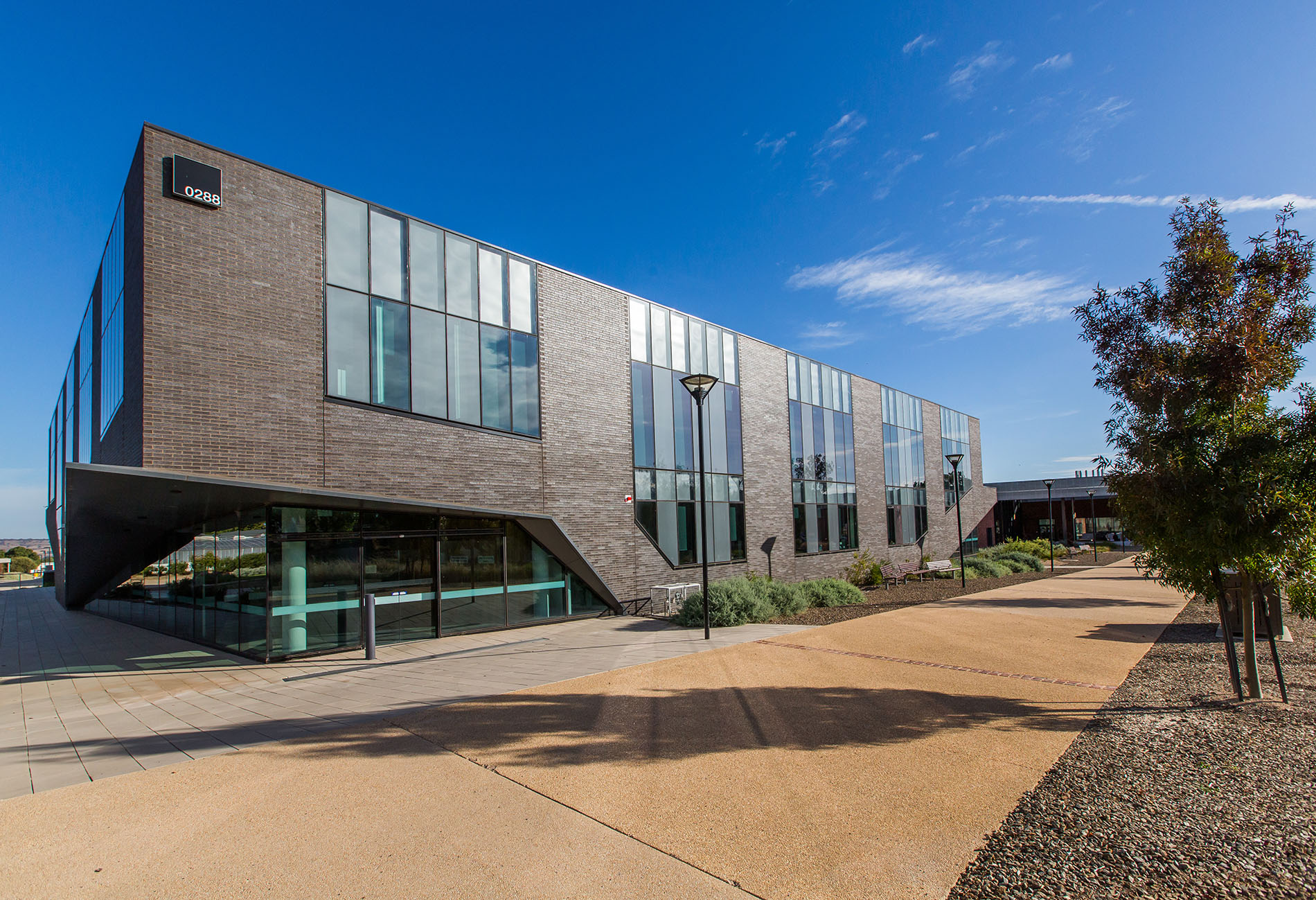
Charles Sturt University's Wagga Wagga campus

The Riverina Institute, a collection of TAFE institute campuses has its headquarters in Wagga Wagga and Wagga is home to three campuses. The Primary Industries Centre, at North Wagga Wagga is set on 250 hectares and runs courses on agriculture and horticulture. The National Aerospace Training Centre of Excellence, at RAAF Base Wagga provides training support to the Australian Defence Force aerospace traineeship program. The commercial contract with the ADF is the largest technical training contract in Australia. In addition Wagga Wagga is home to eight secondary schools and 22 primary schools.

=== Government ===
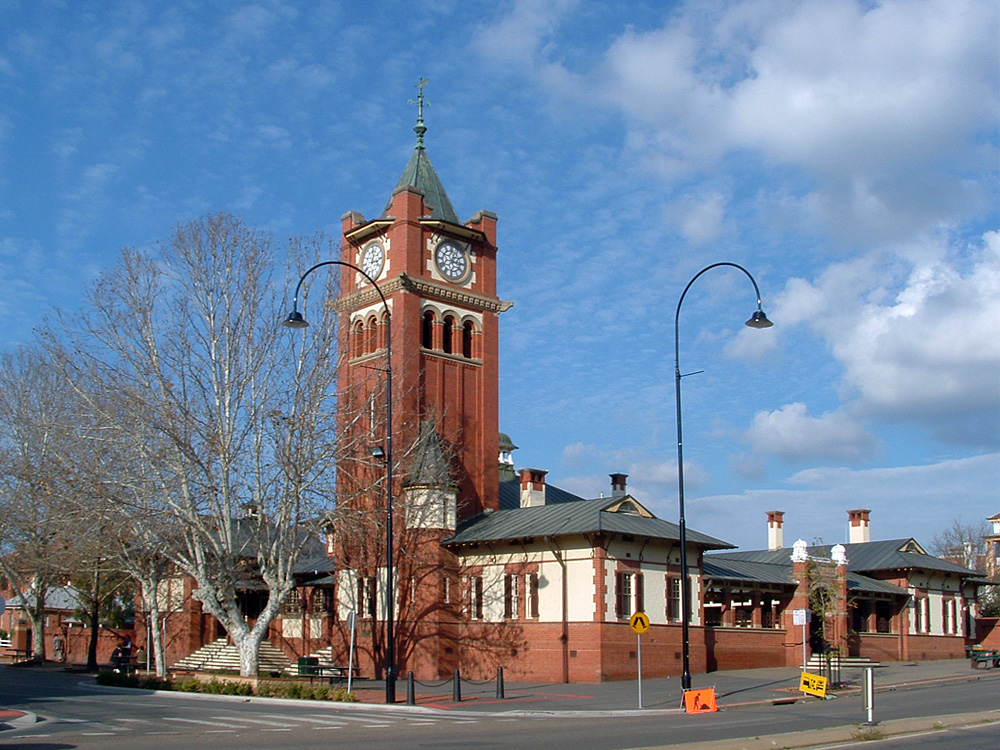
Wagga Wagga Court House

Local government for the city is provided by the Wagga Wagga City Council. As well as Wagga Wagga itself the City Council area includes the outlying towns of Tarcutta, Ladysmith, Mangoplah, Collingullie and Uranquinty covering an area of 4,824 km^{2}. The local government area was formed as a result of the amalgamation of the City of Wagga Wagga with the Mitchell and Kyeamba Shires in 1981. The council itself consists of 9 councillors elected for a four-year term and from these a mayor and deputy mayor are elected each year by the council.

Wagga Wagga is the largest city in the Australian House of Representatives electorate of Riverina, currently represented by Michael McCormack of the National Party. At the state level, the city is represented in the New South Wales Legislative Assembly by Joe McGirr, Independent member for the Electoral district of Wagga Wagga.

== Transport ==
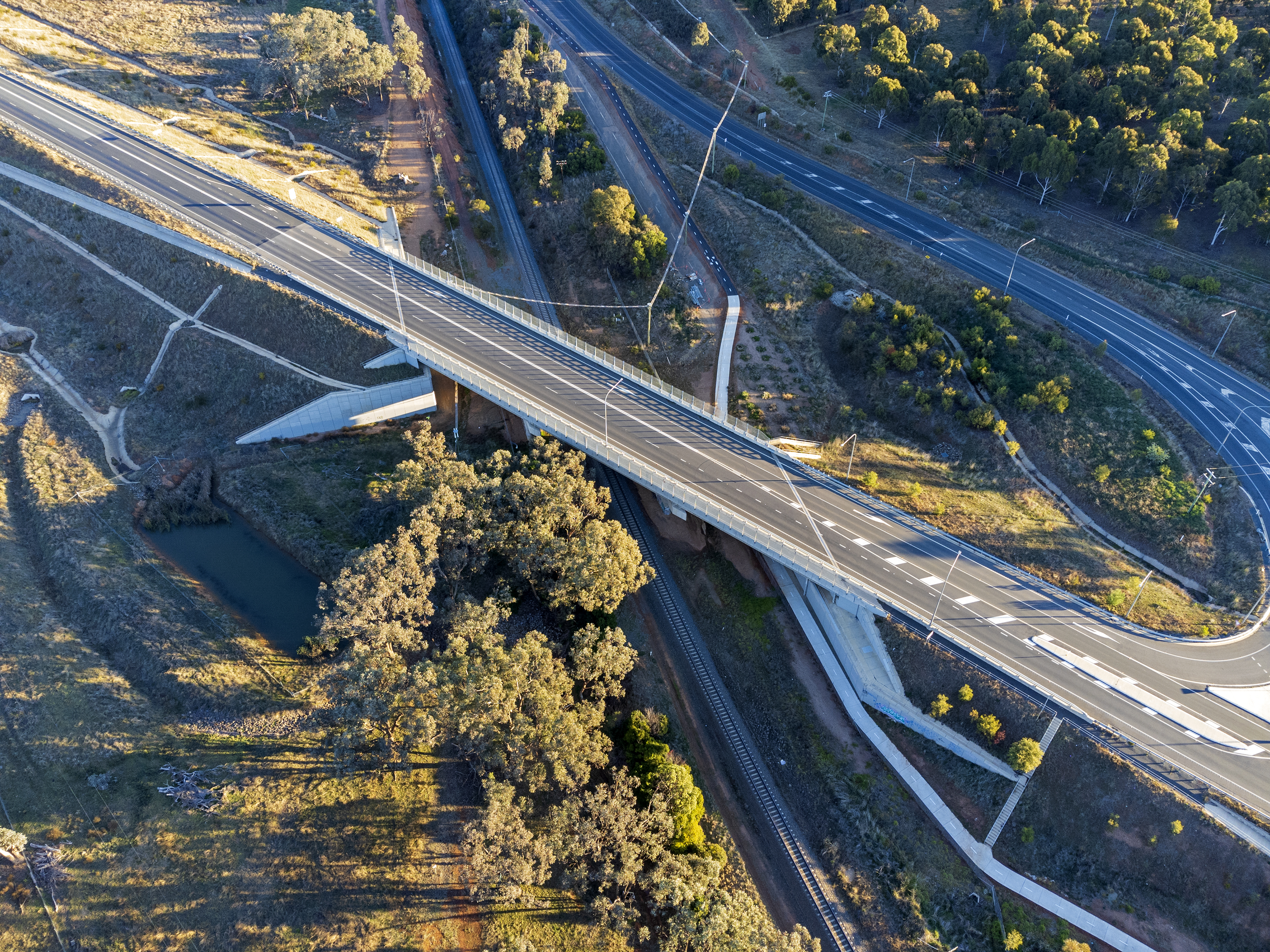
The Kapooka Bridge is part of the Olympic Highway; a major arterial road into Wagga Wagga. Visible below is the Main Southern railway line

Busabout Wagga Wagga provides bus services from most Wagga Wagga suburbs to the CBD 365 days a year, including public holidays.

Allen's Coaches of Coolamon and Junee Buses provide weekday connections to Coolamon (routes 1W, 2W and 3W) and Junee (routes 21–25) respectively.

Wagga Radio Cabs run taxis 24/7 in the city with taxi ranks at Station Place, Forsyth Street, Gurwood Street, Wagga Wagga Base Hospital and Kooringal Mall.

Baylis Street in the CBD was a thoroughfare for the Olympic Highway until the Gobbagombalin Bridge (referred to locally as the Gobba Bridge and is believed to be the longest continuous-span viaduct in New South Wales) about 6 km northwest of the CBD was opened on 26 July 1997. The Sturt Highway passes through the centre of Wagga Wagga.

=== Rail ===
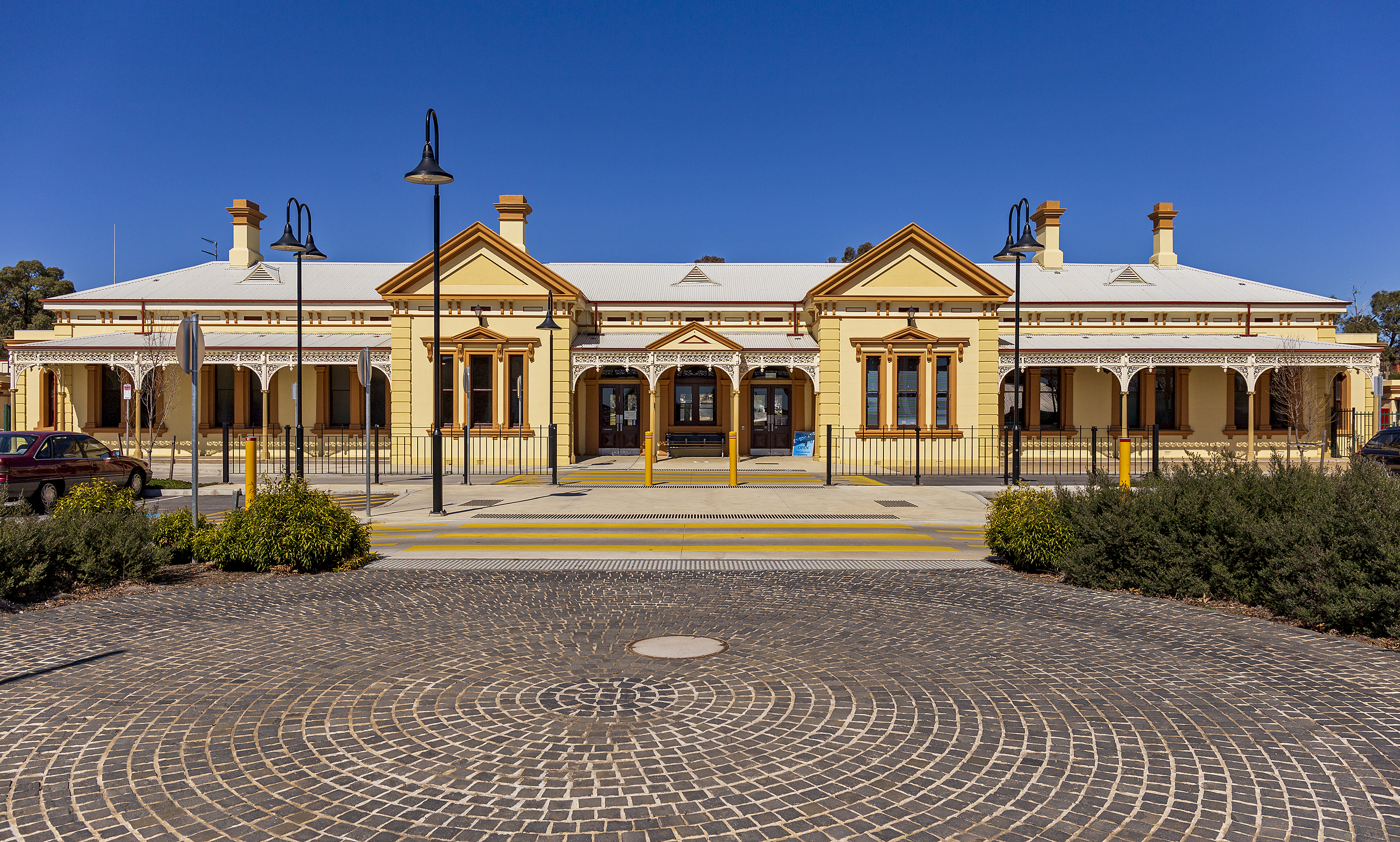
Wagga Wagga railway station

Wagga Wagga railway station is located on the Main Southern railway line with twice daily XPT rail services provided by NSW TrainLink, the state owned passenger rail service.

=== Airport ===
Wagga Wagga Airport at Forest Hill has scheduled daily flights to Sydney, Melbourne and Brisbane operated by two carriers, Rex Airlines and QantasLink bringing approximately 210,000 passengers through the region every year. Coupled with Rex's major maintenance base and the Australian Airline Pilot Academy (AAPA), the Airport is one of the busiest in regional Australia. The airport itself is owned by the Royal Australian Air Force and the civil side is leased by the Wagga Wagga City Council. The sealed runway can cater for aircraft up to Boeing 737-800 and Airbus A321.

== Sport ==
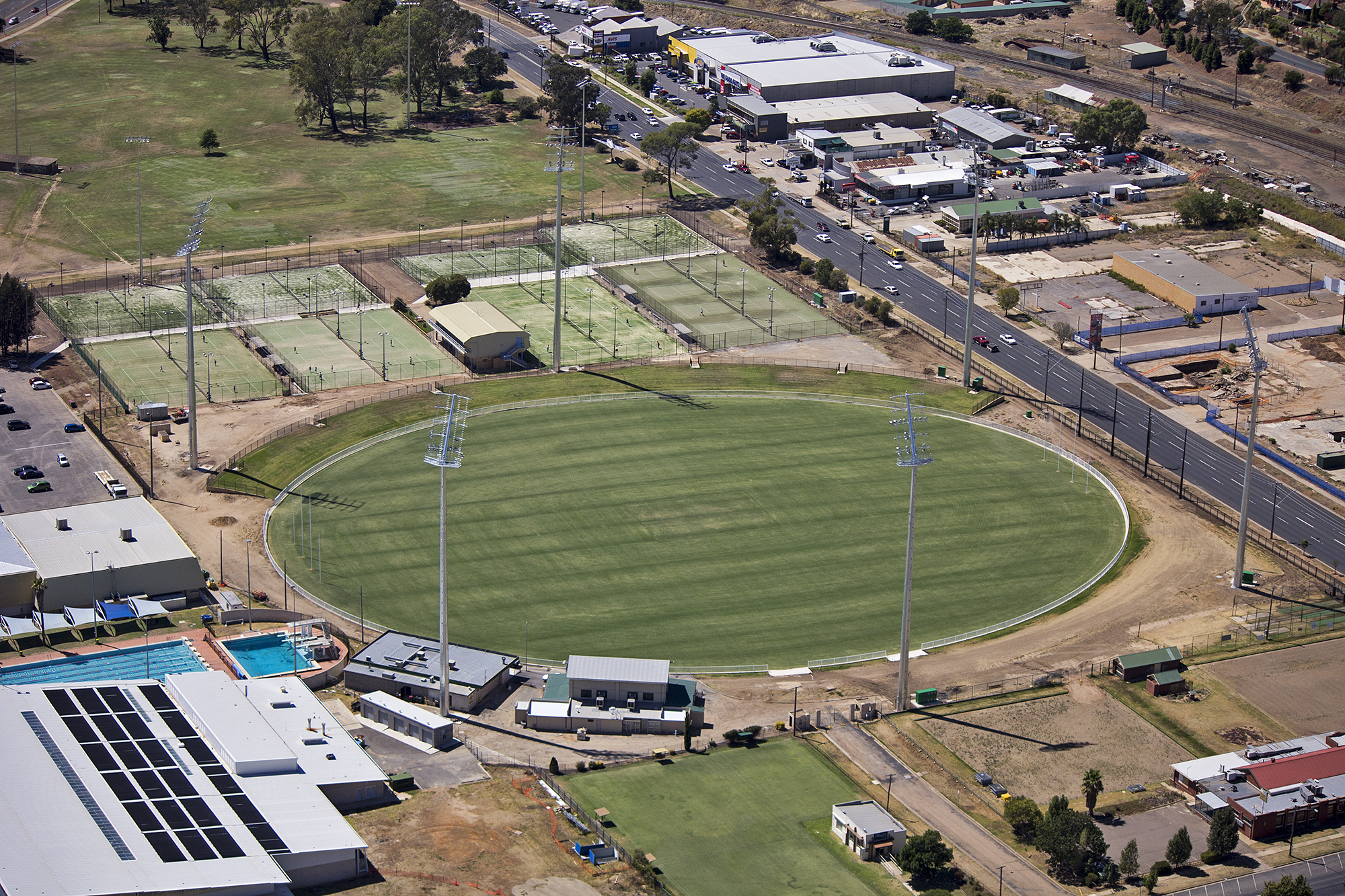
Robertson Oval

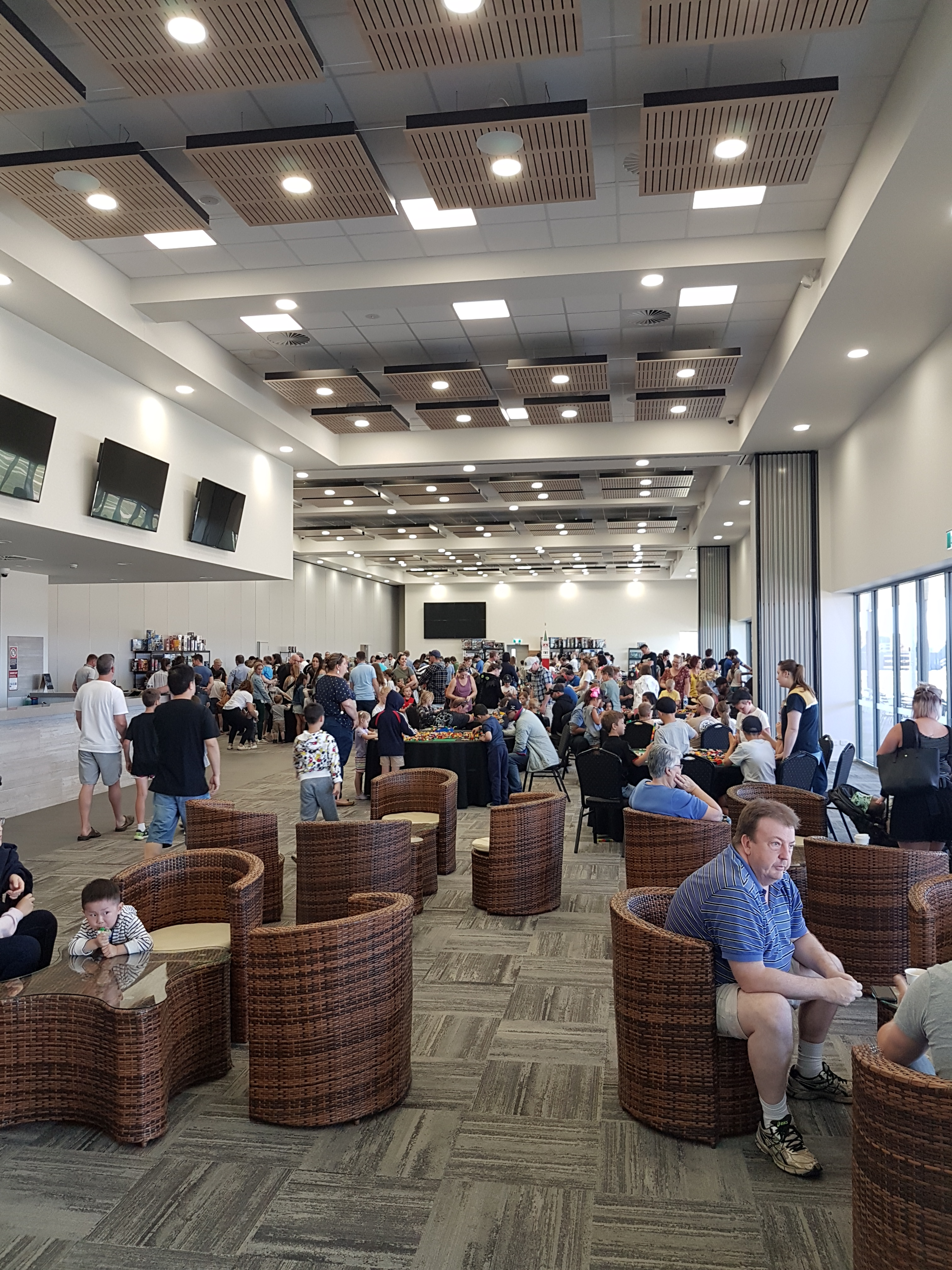
"The Range" function centre

Wagga's location approximately midway between Melbourne and Sydney on the "Barassi Line" contributes to high levels of football participation in all codes: Australian rules football, rugby league, rugby union and soccer. Other popular sports in Wagga include cricket, tennis, and lawn bowls.

The city has eight Australian rules football clubs, including: Mangoplah–Cookardinia United-Eastlakes, Wagga Tigers, Collingullie–Wagga and Turvey Park in the Riverina Football League and East Wagga-Kooringal, North Wagga and Rivcoll (CSU) in the Farrer Football League.

There are four Rugby union teams which include: CSU Reddies, Wagga Agricultural College, Wagga City and Wagga Waratahs in the Southern Inland Rugby Union.

Four soccer teams based in the city include: Henwood Park, Wagga United, Tolland and Lake Albert, with the first grade competition for men being the Pascoe Cup and for women the Leonard Cup.

Three local rugby league teams compete in the Group 9 Rugby League competition and include Wagga Brothers, South City and Wagga Kangaroos. National Rugby League games played in Wagga Wagga are held at McDonald's Park. The city also hosts the Group 9 grand final, a major event.

The Wagga Wagga Gold Cup, said to be Australia's second oldest thoroughbred horse race, is held in the first week of May.

East Wagga is home to the Wagga Wagga Gun Club and the Australian Clay Target Association, which has an Olympic-standard clay target shooting range and "The Range" function centre, at 308 Copland Street. The centre, which opened in October 2018, was made possible through a NSW Government grant of $5.5 million.

=== "Wagga Effect" ===
The "Wagga Effect" is a term that has been used frequently in the Australian media to describe the disproportionately large number of elite sportsmen and women that originate from the city. It is speculated that the phenomenon may arise in rural areas where the population is large enough to sustain the presence of a large number of sporting codes, but small enough to ensure that talented individuals are exposed to adult-level competition at an earlier age.

Notable sportspeople from Wagga include:

- Australian rules football – Wayne Carey, Paul Hawke, Paul Kelly, Bill Mohr, Cameron Mooney, John Pitura, Adam Schneider, Matt Suckling, Isaac Smith, Harry Cunningham, Dougal Howard, Harry Himmelberg, Gabrielle Colvin and Ally Morphett
- Cricket – Geoff Lawson, Michael Slater, and Mark Taylor
- Golf – US PGA Championship winner Steve Elkington
- Horse racing – jockey Scobie Breasley
- Rugby league – Greg Brentnall, Ben Cross, Marc Glanville, Chris Mortimer, Peter Mortimer, Steve Mortimer, Jamie Soward, and Peter Sterling
- Rugby union – Nathan Hines, Nathan Sharpe, and Corey Toole
- Rugby sevens – Alicia Quirk
- Soccer – Australia women's national soccer team representative Sally Shipard
- Tennis – Tony Roche, 1966 French Open champion, and later a coach, is from Tarcutta near Wagga
- Triathlon – Brad Kahlefeldt, Commonwealth Games Gold Medallist, Olympian, and World Champion
- Snooker – Quinten Hann, former Elite 'Top 16' player and world championship quarter-finalist.

In 1993, the City of Wagga Wagga instituted a Sporting Hall of Fame as part of the Museum of the Riverina dedicated to the elite sportspeople from Wagga Wagga and the surrounding area.

=== 5 o'clock wave ===
According to the local urban myth, at precisely 5 o'clock a giant wave moves down the Murrumbidgee River, a result of water being released from the Blowering and Burrinjuck Dams. The wave is said to continue down river at high speed, and visitors are told it is so powerful that surfers can ride it along the meandering river until it reaches the town of Narrandera.

== Recreation and culture ==
=== Recreation ===
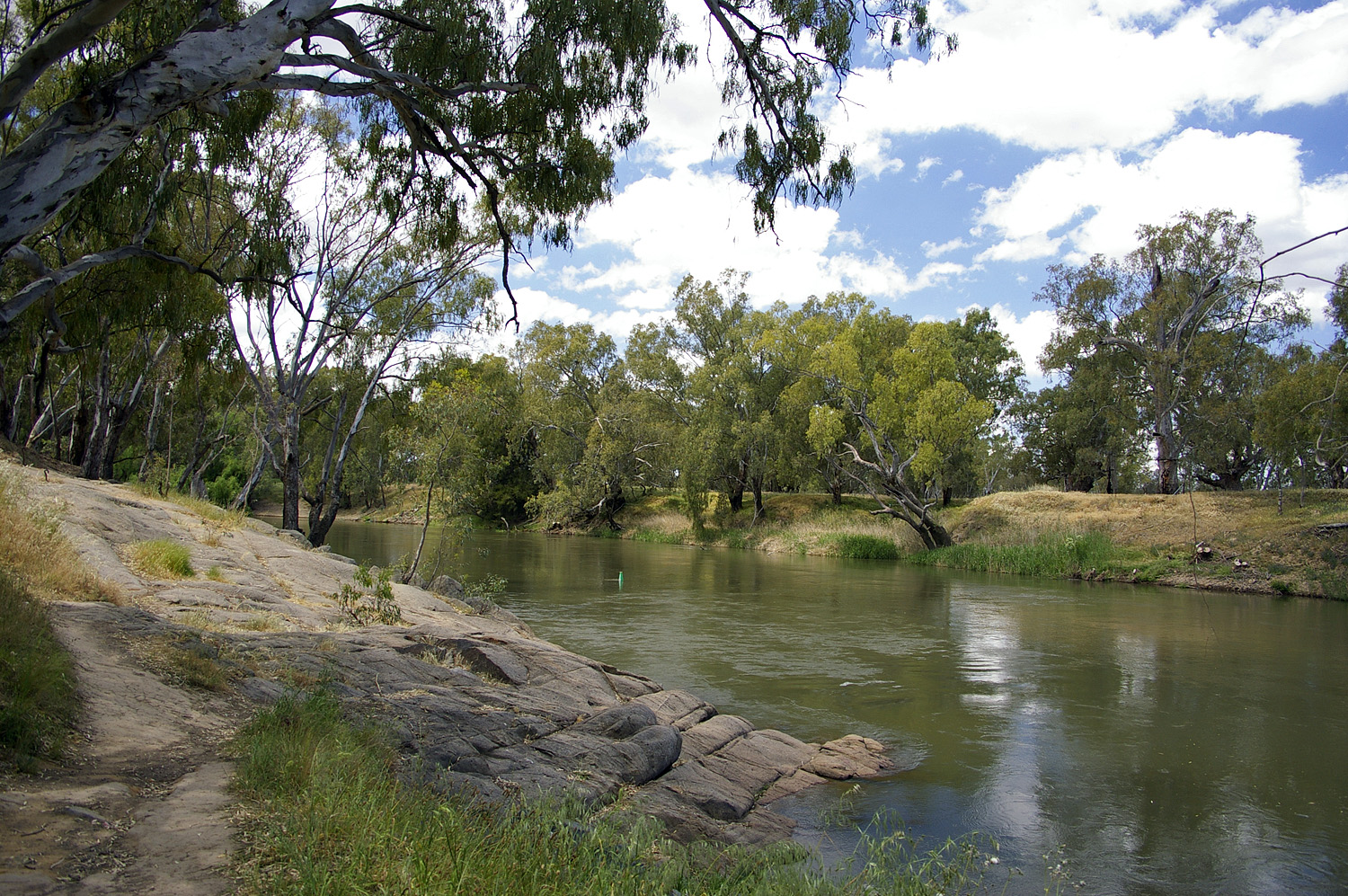
"The Rocks" on the Murrumbidgee River

The Murrumbidgee River at Wagga Wagga forms into a large sandy beach, and is a popular location for swimming, picnics and barbecues during the warmer months. Between 1977 and 1995 the beach played host to the Gumi Races, where people were encouraged to make rafts from inner tubing and sabotage their competition by throwing rotten eggs and flour at them. Visitors and local residents still take every opportunity during the warmer months to float down the river from the area known as "The Rocks" some 600 metres upstream from the main beach area.

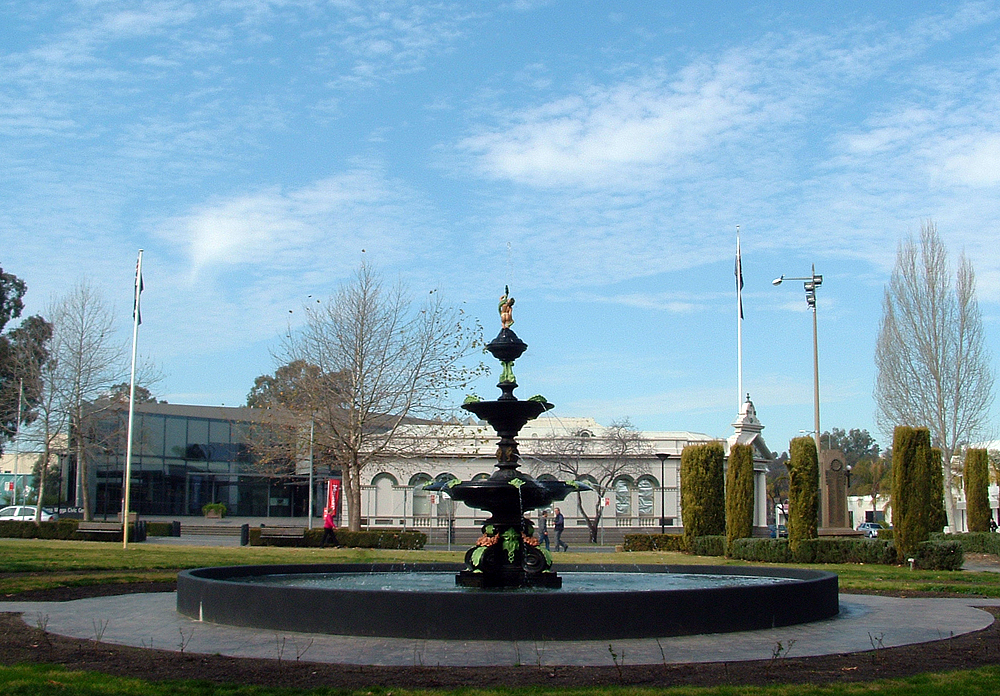
The Chisholm Fountain at the Victory Memorial Gardens

Wollundry Lagoon, Lake Albert and parks provide recreational facilities. Sporting facilities include the Oasis Regional Aquatic Centre, with Australia's only wave ball. Wagga Wagga Civic Theatre and the Forum 6 Cinemas provide entertainment venues. The Wagga Wagga Botanic Gardens are home to a music bowl, a small zoo with a walk through aviary, a tree chapel, Willans Hill Miniature Railway and a camellia garden. Located on the banks of the Wollundry lagoon and officially opened in 1927, the Victory Memorial Gardens were established amidst some controversy as a tribute to those who fought and died in World War I.

=== Culture ===
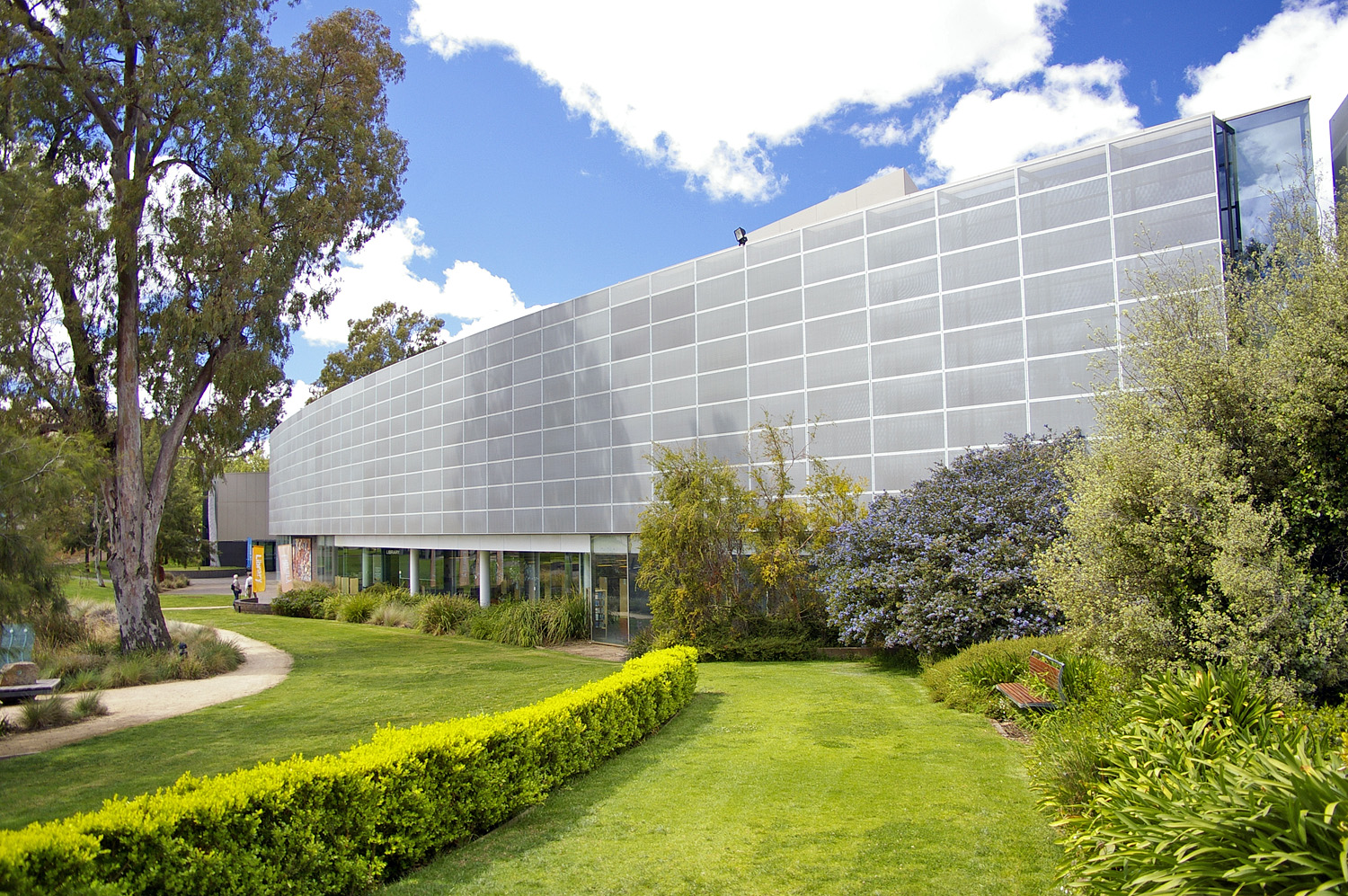
The Wagga Wagga Civic Centre

The main cultural precinct for Wagga Wagga can be found in central Wagga Wagga, at the Wagga Wagga Civic Centre on the banks of Wollundry Lagoon. The precinct includes the Wagga Wagga Civic Theatre, Museum of the Riverina, Wagga Wagga Art Gallery (incorporating the National Art Glass Gallery) and Wagga Wagga City Library.

The Wagga Wagga Civic Theatre was officially opened in 1963 at a cost of £165,000. During its design and construction and again after opening the theatre was the subject of severe criticism. Critics lamented the destruction of rose gardens removed to allow construction, the size of the orchestra pit, the amount of seating (497 seats) as well as the design of the feature mural. A considerable refurbishment was carried out in the 1990s and now the theatre is regarded as one of the best in regional Australia, playing host to national and international touring acts.

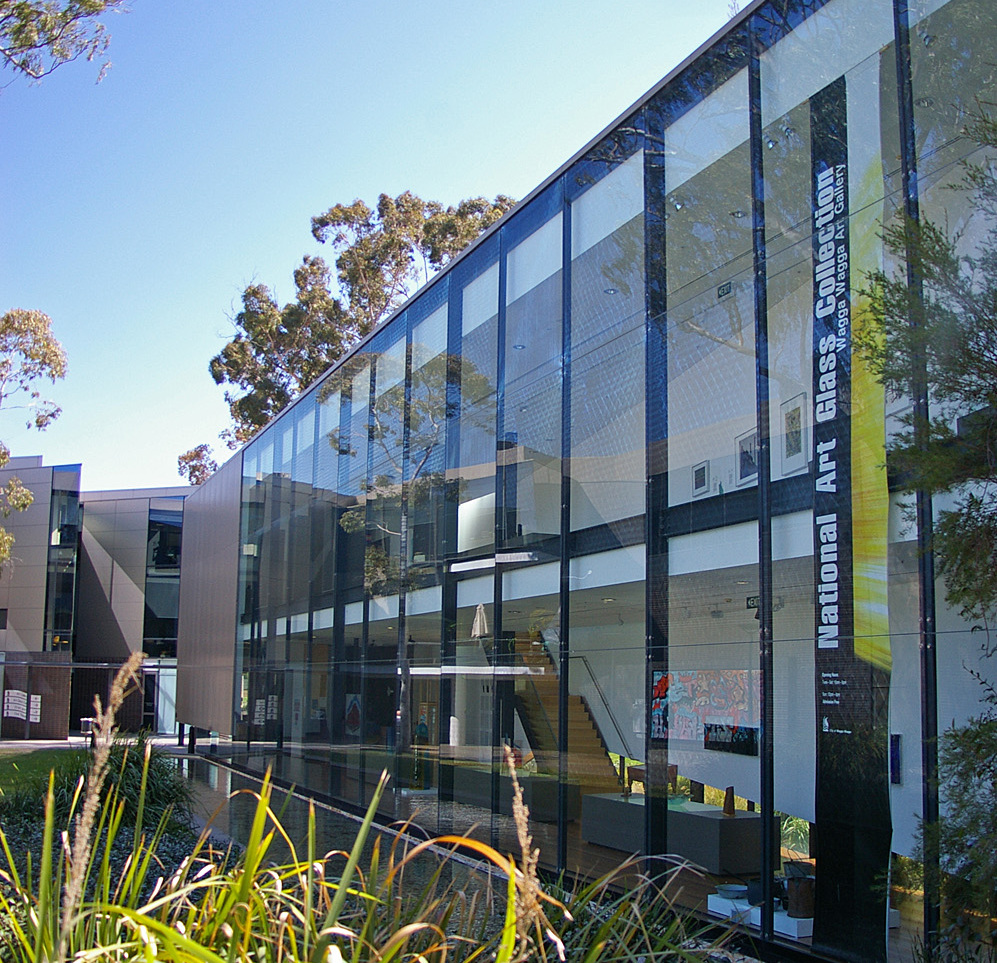
The National Art Glass Gallery

The Wagga Wagga Art Gallery hosts local collections and travelling exhibitions and has space for an artist in residence. The centrepiece of the collection is the National Art Glass Gallery, a nationally significant collection of studio art glass hosted in a separate, specially designed gallery. The collection was first established by the former director of the Wagga Wagga Regional Art Gallery, Judy Le Lievre, in response to a request by the Australia Council for regional galleries to develop a specialised collection to avoid duplication and competition. The collection consists of around 400 works, making it the largest studio glass collection in Australia.

The Museum of the Riverina was established in 1967 by the Wagga Wagga and District Historical Society. Wagga Wagga City Council took over its operations in the late 1990s and it now operates at two sites. The Historic Council Chambers site on the corner of Baylis and Morrow streets in central Wagga, hosts travelling exhibitions and the main site at the Botanic Gardens is home to the main collection including the Wagga Wagga Sporting Hall of Fame. The museum has an important collection of memorabilia about the Tichborne Case, including a set of four rare plaster figurines depicting characters from the trial, a complete set of hard-bound court transcripts and a monumental painting entitled The Tichborne Trial painted in 1874 by Nathan Hughes, which hangs in the city's council chambers.

The Wagga Wagga Jazz Festival was established in 1995 and has featured a range of Australian and international musicians. Established in 1976 as the Riverina Trucking Company and renamed in 1983, the Riverina Theatre Company is one of Australia's longest running regional theatre companies and runs a full program of events each year at the Riverina Playhouse, which is located on the banks of the Murrumbidgee River and owned by Charles Sturt University.

Notable artists and performers from Wagga Wagga include poet Dame Mary Gilmore, who is featured on the Australian ten-dollar note and veteran actor Bill Kerr. Former Yellow Wiggle, Sam Moran, is from Wagga Wagga, having replaced the original Yellow Wiggle, Greg Page, in November 2006. The fictional creation of satirist Barry Humphries, Dame Edna Everage was said to have been born in Wagga Wagga.

Frank Ottenson wrote a song Wagga Wagga about the city in 1942, calling it a 'Riverina paradise'. It was recorded by Tom Davidson and his Orchestra.

Wagga has strong cultural ties with three international sister cities which form part of a twinning program. Wagga's sister cities are Leavenworth, Kansas in the United States, which was established in 1962; Nördlingen in Germany, established in 1967; and Kunming in China, mutually established in 1988.

In April 2020, The Wagga council voted to cut ties with China's Kunming city. A week later they voted again, rejoining Kunming as a sister city.

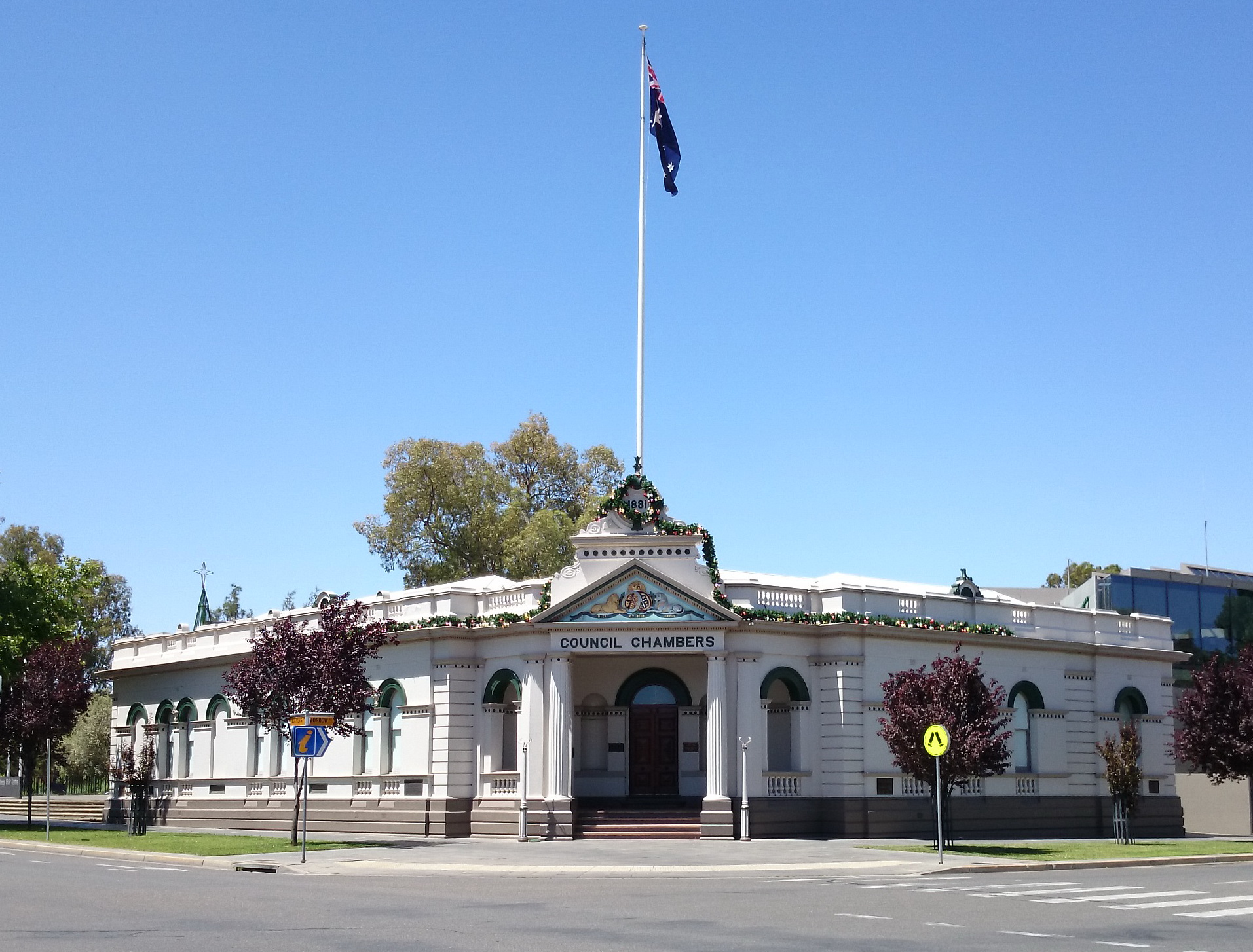
The former Council Chambers

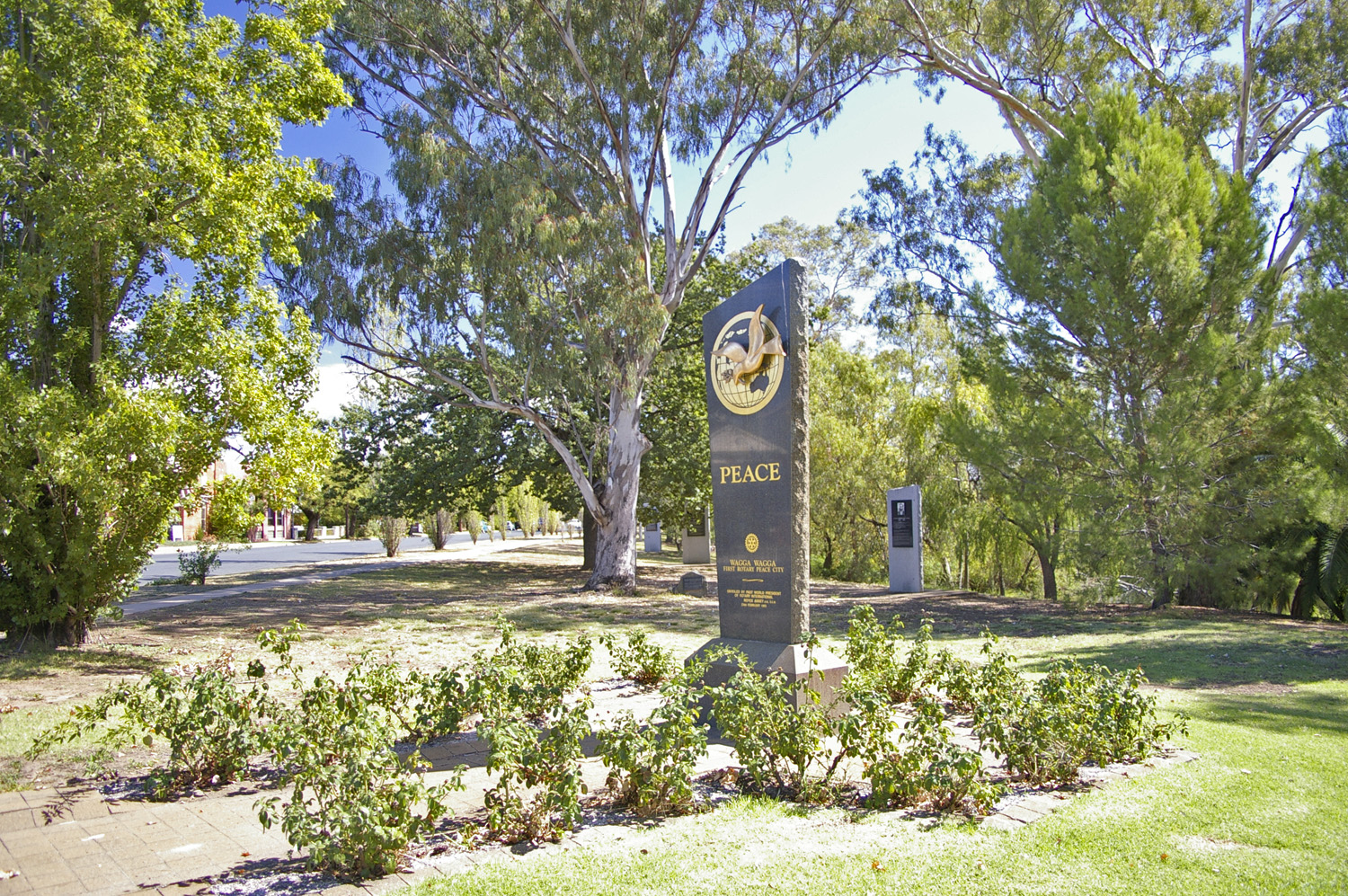
The Wagga Rotary Peace Monument

=== Literary links ===
Wagga has captured the interest of writers, novelists and songwriters over the years. Specifically the city's international notoriety surrounding Arthur Orton and the Tichborne Case attracted a visit from Mark Twain when he visited Australia in the 1890s. Wagga has been home to a number of famous Australian writers, including Frank Moorhouse who worked as a journalist on the city's daily newspaper, and the poets Mary Gilmore and Barcroft Boake.

Humourist Spike Milligan was quite taken with the double-barrelled names of Australian towns, and presented a show called "Australia: From Woy Woy to Wagga Wagga".

In other cases the town's name has been directly referred to as part of the content of songs and novels. For example, the song Don't call Wagga Wagga Wagga, written by Australian country music artists Greg Champion and Jim Haynes, was a minor hit on the Australian country charts and is a light-hearted take on the habit of Australians to refer to double named towns by one name only. Other examples include the Harry Potter series of fantasy novels, where the character Gilderoy Lockhart claimed to have defeated the "Wagga Wagga Werewolf", the Bryce Courtenay book The Power of One, where the main character Peekay is said to have a cousin Lenny from Wagga Wagga Australia, the Bryce Courtenay book Jessica has several passages that take place in Wagga Wagga, including the judgement of Billy Simple, and the Robert G. Barrett novel, "Mud Crab Boogie" which is partially set in Wagga Wagga.

== Media ==
As a regional centre for the Riverina and South West Slopes, Wagga Wagga is home to a number of regional media outlets.

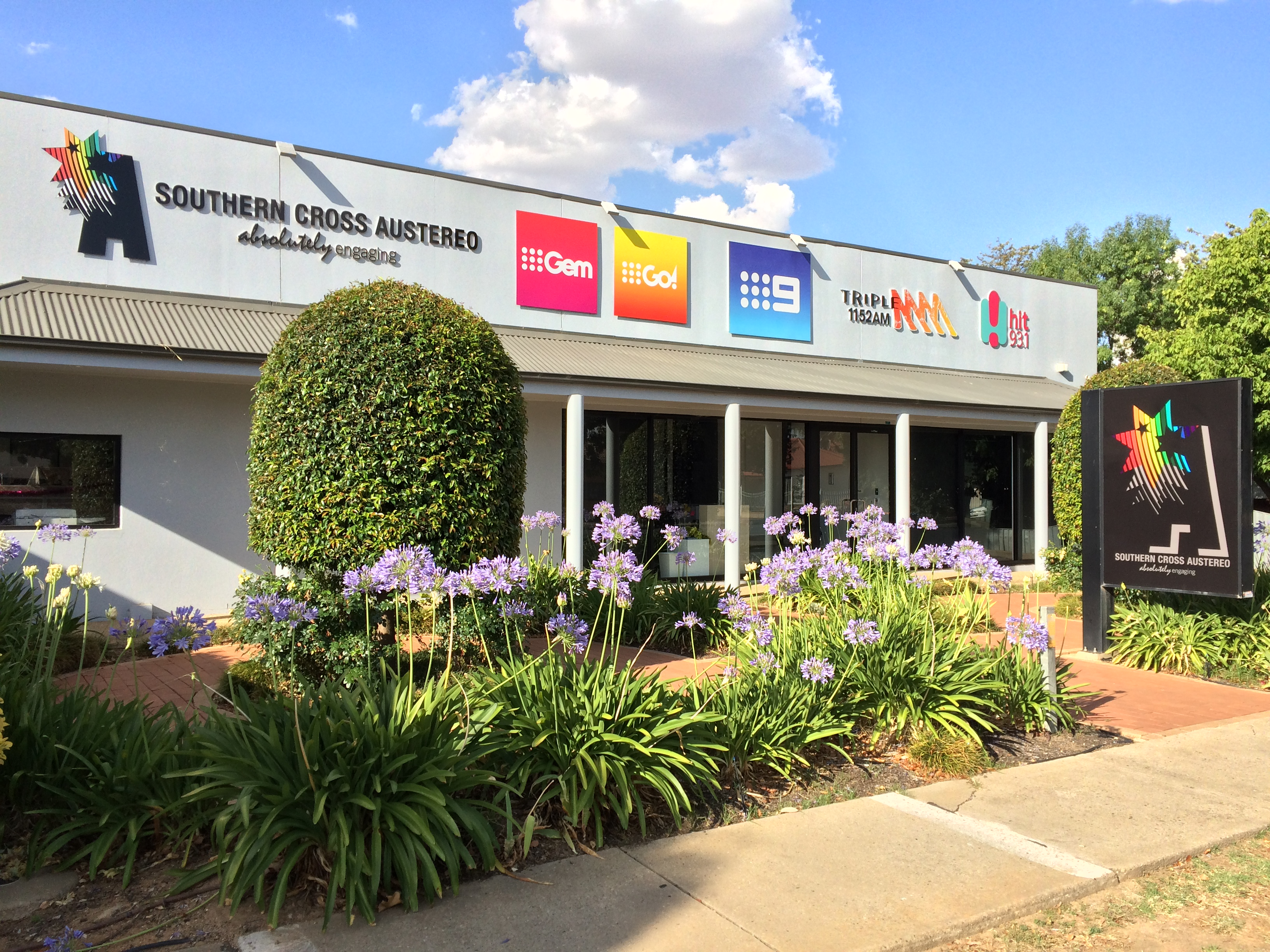
The Triple M Riverina studios on Forsyth Street

Wagga receives the ABC's four free-to-air national television channels ABC TV (formerly ABC1), ABC Family (formerly ABC TV Plus, ABC Comedy and ABC2) together with ABC Kids (formerly ABC 4 Kids), ABC Entertains (formerly ABC Me and ABC3) and ABC News (formerly ABC News 24), as well as SBS's six television channels SBS TV, SBS2 (formerly SBS Two and SBS Viceland), SBS Food (formerly Food Network), SBS World Movies, SBS WorldWatch and NITV.

The commercial networks' main channels are Seven Network (formerly Prime7 and Prime Television), Nine Network from WIN Television (formerly carried by Southern Cross Austereo) and Channel 10 from Network 10 (formerly carried by WIN Television and Southern Cross Austereo) and the commercial networks' multi channels 7two, 7mate, 7Bravo (stylised as 7bravo in the logo) and 7flix from Seven Regional (formerly Prime7 and Prime Television), 9Go!, 9Gem and 9Life from WIN Television (formerly carried by Southern Cross Austereo) and News24 Regional, 10 Drama (formerly One, One HD, 10 Boss, 10 Bold and 10 Bold Drama), 10 Comedy (formerly 10 Peach Comedy, 10 Peach and Eleven) and Nickelodeon from Network 10 (formerly carried by WIN Television and Southern Cross Austereo).

Of the three main commercial networks:

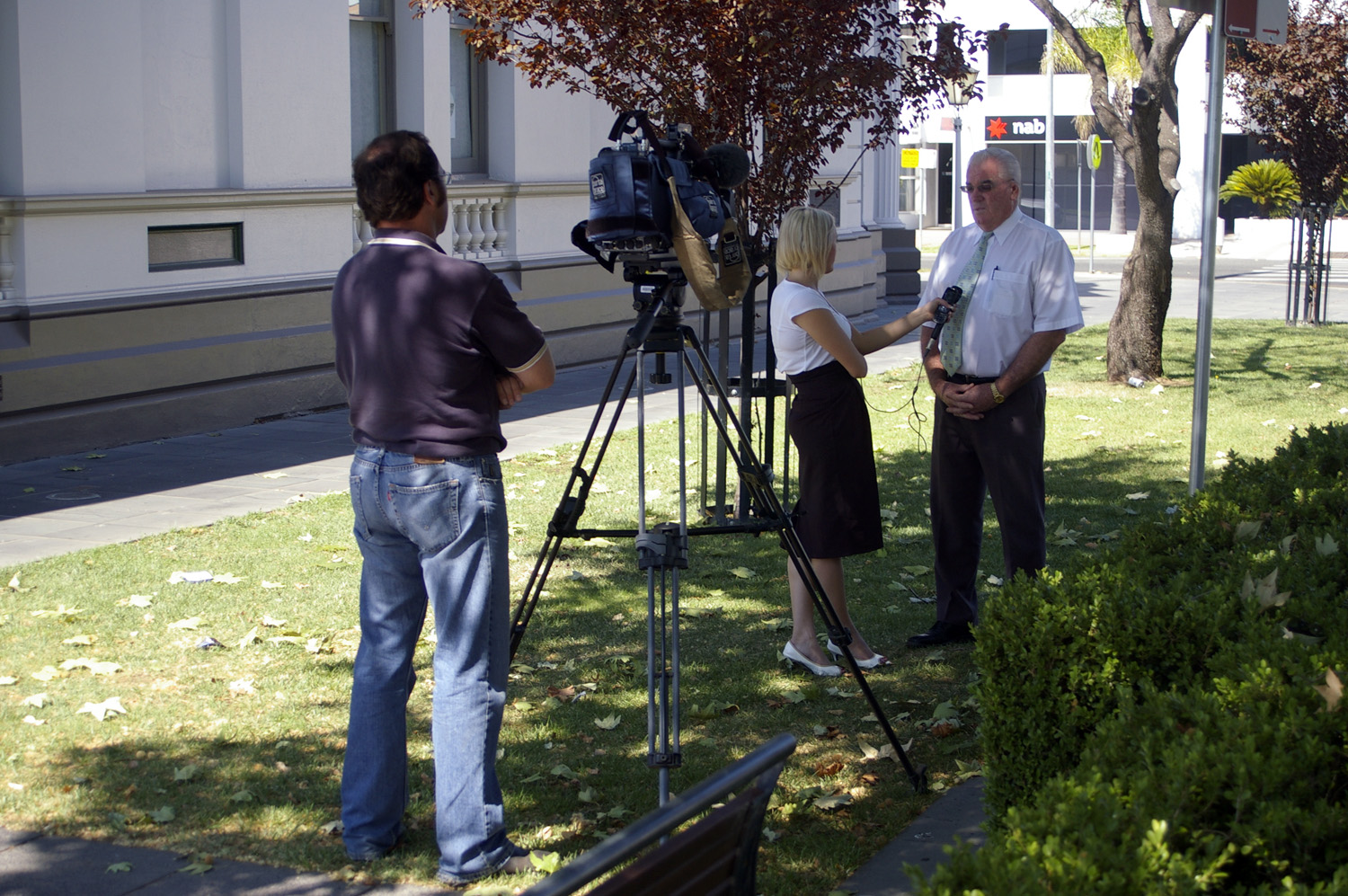
Prime News interviewing Wagga Wagga Mayor Kerry Pascoe

- Seven News (formerly Prime7 News and Prime News) produces a half-hour local news bulletin for the Riverina, airing each weeknight at 6pm. It is produced from a local newsroom in Wagga Wagga and broadcast from studios in Canberra.
- Network 10 (formerly Southern Cross 10) airs short local news updates throughout the day, broadcast from studios in Hobart. Previously, a regional New South Wales edition of Nine News from Sydney each weeknight at 6pm, featuring opt-outs for Wagga Wagga and the Riverina when the station was affiliated with the Nine Network.
- WIN Television aired a half-hour local bulletin until the closure of its Wagga Wagga newsroom in June 2019. Between June 2019 and June 2021 the station produced short news updates throughout the day from its Wollongong studios. From July 2021, the Wagga Wagga newsroom was reopened, with the stories now inserted into a statewide bulletin which airs across the broadcast area on the network.

Local radio stations broadcasting from Wagga Wagga include ABC Riverina, AM radio commercial station Triple M Riverina, 1152 kHz), FM radio commercial station Hit93.1 Riverina, racing and sports station Sky Sports Radio and a rebroadcast from radio reading service Radio 1RPH. Other local stations include Christian radio station Life FM and the community station 2AAA FM. The ABC's national stations Radio National, ABC Classic, ABC NewsRadio and Triple J and the multicultural network SBS Radio are broadcast into Wagga Wagga.

The Daily Advertiser, published Monday to Friday and its sister publication, the Weekend Advertiser, service Wagga and much of the surrounding region. The newspaper was established by two wealthy local pastoralists, Auber George Jones and Thomas Darlow and first printed on 10 December 1868 by editor Frank Hutchison, an Oxford graduate. Originally printed bi-weekly, by 1880 it was tri-weekly and became 'daily' in December 1910. In 1962 the newspaper reduced in size from a broadsheet to a tabloid format. The Riverina Leader, the local free community newspaper was launched in May 1979.

== Notable people ==
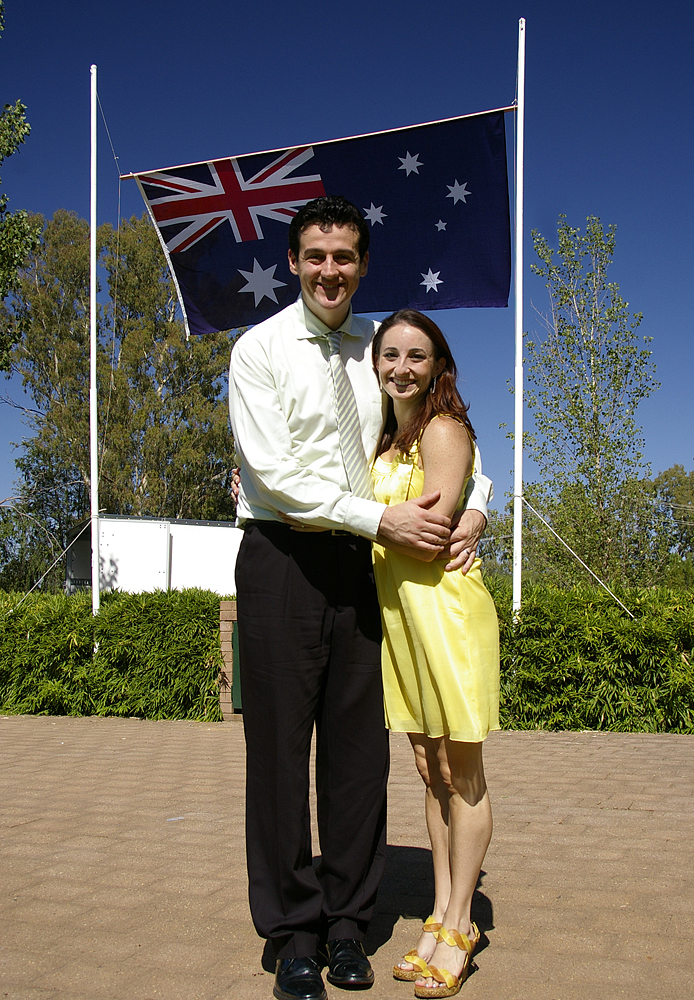
Sam Moran and wife Lyn Moran at Australia Day 2009 Celebrations in Wagga Wagga

- Sharna Burgess (Dancing with the Stars professional dancer)
- Wayne Carey AFL (North Melbourne FC and 2x Premiership player)
- Dame Edna Everage (a fictional character created by Barry Humphries)
- Carmel Kaine (classical violinist)
- Paul Kelly (Former Australian rules footballer, Brownlow Medal winner and captain of the Sydney Swans for ten seasons)
- Bill Kerr (Australian actor and co-star of the BBC radio comedy Hancock's Half Hour)
- Nina Las Vegas (DJ)
- Geoff Lawson (cricketer)
- Jack Littlejohn (rugby league player)
- Lex Marinos (actor)
- Steve Martin (Rugby league player)
- Jada Mathyssen-Whyman (Soccer player for the Australia national team)
- Michael McCormack (18th Deputy Prime Minister of Australia)
- Sam Moran (former member of the children's musical group The Wiggles)
- William Monks (architect)
- Chris Mortimer (rugby league player)
- Peter Mortimer (Rugby league player)
- Arthur Orton (Imposter of the late 19th century)
- Alicia Quirk (Australian Women's Rugby sevens player and 2016 Summer Olympics gold medal winner)
- Isabel Reid, Wiradjuri Elder and Stolen Generations advocate
- Tony Roche (1966 French Open tennis champion)
- Nathan Sharpe (Rugby union player)
- Michael Slater (Cricketer)
- Peter Sterling (Rugby League player and TV commentator)
- Emma Swift (singer-songwriter)
- Mark Taylor (Australian cricket captain)
- Mother Mary Xavier Byrne (Presentation Sister)

== See also ==
- The Bee Gees – who wrote "Morning of My Life" at the Wagga Police Boys Club
- Chiko Roll – first sold in 1951 at the Wagga Wagga show
- Eric Weissel Oval
- Eurythmics – who formed in Wagga Wagga
- HMAS Wagga
- List of reduplicated Australian place names
- List of people from Wagga Wagga
- List of Wagga Wagga suburbs and localities
- Mortimer family (Australia)
- Murrumbidgee Co-operative Milling
- Pulletop bushfire
- Wagga Wagga War Cemetery
- Wagga Wagga Leagues Club
