= Hambledon Homestead =

- Location within New South Wales Location within Australia
- 35°17′02″S 147°43′39″E
- Location: Tarcutta Street, Tarcutta, City of Wagga Wagga, New South Wales, Australia

New South Wales Heritage Register
- Official name: Hambledon Homestead; Tarcutta Station
- Type: State heritage (landscape)
- Designated: 2 April 1999
- Reference no.: 351
- Type: Homestead Complex
- Category: Farming and Grazing

The Hambledon Homestead is a heritage-listed residence and former inn and store at Tarcutta, in the Riverina region of New South Wales, Australia. It is also known as Tarcutta Station. It was added to the New South Wales State Heritage Register on 2 April 1999.

== History ==
In the beginning the Wiradjuri (Waradgery) people traversed the Tarcutta Valley, as they moved about their territory which 'extended from about Jugiong and Tumut in the east to the junction of the Lachlan and Murrumbidgee rivers in the west, while their northern boundary was somewhere out between these two rivers and their southern about Billabong Creek.'

The Bugong (Bogong moth) formed the Waradgery tribe's principal food during the summer. Their weapons were like those of the natives of the colony, except the spears, which were made of strong knotted reeds approximately 1.8-metre (6 ft) long, to which was affixed a piece of hardwood, approximately 0.61 metres (2 ft) in length with a rounded point, barbed in some instances with numerous small pieces of flint or agate. Many Aboriginal implements have been found in Keajura district paddocks.

The name Tarcutta (Lower) is Wiradjuri for 'meal made from Gulla or grass seed, or flour and cakes made from grass seed. The name Murrumbidgee (Morumbeeja) is Wiradjuri for a flood (or a big one water).

The first white colonisers to view these people were Hume & Hovell, who recorded the event on 6 January 1825. Early that year their party of eight persons were crossing the valleys south of Tarcutta. Near Tarcutta the party came upon a group of friendly Aboriginal people. The explorers were very impressed with the physical characteristics of these people and became friendly with them, some of whom later travelled with them as far as Yass. Hume reported that the timber principally observed in the district was stringybark (Eucalyptus sp.).

Late in 1829 Charles Sturt explored the Murrumbidgee River, commenting on the last permanent settlement near Jugiong and the last sight of settlers at South Gundagai. The real stimuli to pastoral development were the buoyant conditions of the 1820s and the desire for new and better grazing lands. After 1822 enterprising pastoralists sent members of their families with shepherds or stockmen, or even just sent the shepherds or stockmen, to graze stock in distant areas under Tickets of Occupation. These were sometimes established pastoralists from near Sydney, or Sydney businessmen, or even both. Although much of this early pastoral development of the region was a part of wider family and company interests, some early settlers had no pastoral interests outside the area.

A good example was Thomas Mate, an Englishman who settled on the Tarcutta Creek thirty miles east of Wagga Wagga in 1835 or 1836, and quickly expanded his activities to include a store and inn because of his position on the Port Phillip Road. When licences were introduced in 1837 the Murrumbidgee River frontage had already been occupied below Wagga Wagga. By the same year Thomas Mate had occupied the Upper Tarcutta Creek, John Smith the Kyeamba Creek and there had been settlement on the Hillas and Adelong Creeks.

In October 1836 Major Thomas Mitchell's party approached Tarcutta. Near Kyeamba he wrote of finding cattle marks in the valley and tracks of well shod horses, finding a wild herd of at least 800 head. He commented on the dark umbrageous trees overshadowing the noble river, the rich open flats with tame cattle browsing on them, unlike the (other) wild herd. In 1836–7, the first house was only a wattle and daub hut, without floorboards; and in 1838 Thomas Hodgers Mate was the applicant for the runs of Umuther and Toonga, an estimated area of 49,000 hectares (120,000 acres) with a grazing capacity of 800 cattle and 11,000 sheep.

Lady Jane Franklin, wife of the Tasmanian Governor, and the first woman known to travel overland between Melbourne and Sydney, recorded in her diary:

'Thurs 25th April 1839 Tarcutta Creek', saw Aborigines near Mate's homestead. "Dabtoe was the Chief of Hoonbiarjo". In 1843 Henry Bingham, a Crown Lands Commissioner in the County of Murray, noted T. H. Mate's run, Umutter, had 27 residents and good huts on the 7,800-hectare (30 sq mi) (7770ha) property. "An excellent inn kept here and the establishment well conducted". Between 1847 and 18499 a new house was built on the opposite side of the creek, with a vertical slab, and U-shaped homestead.

G. W. Rusden's estimate of the number of children attending Wagga Wagga School 1849 included 16 from Mate's Tarcutta Run.

Thomas Hodges Mate arrived in Sydney in 1833 on the ship "Palambam" from Sudan via Hobart. He was a cabinet maker. Also on the ship were the Bardwell family, one of whom, 17 year old Maria, was later to become his wife. They married on 8 February 1836 at St. James' Church, Sydney and would go on to have eight children.

Mate was born in Kent on 5 April 1810 (according to Heaton) into a French Huguenot family with the name "Meitte" (pronounced 'Mate'). He spent part of his childhood in France and was always interested in the French language. He remained in Sydney for 12–18 months, having A£1000 in funds. Taking the advice of friends he moved into the interior in 1835. At the age of 23 his first speculation was to buy some sheep from Hannibal Macarthur, a nephew of John Macarthur of Camden Park and Elizabeth Farm, Parramatta. He headed south with his flock by bullock wagon and horseback with his wife and infant in the late spring of 1836 and finally settled down on the Tarcutta Creek.

Reports of the Aborigines' depredations on the Murray were such as to deter Mate from going further south. His relations with the blacks who numbered as many as 300 or 400 camping around his place at the one time were such that they never killed nor even molested a single person on the station, nor did any appreciable damage during a period of forty years, and were otherwise useful about the station.

Mate succeeded with the Aborigines in the district by kindness and firmness. He insisted on them obeying his orders, and faithfully kept his promises to them. Mrs Annie Thompson (daughter of T.H. Mate) on her 100th birthday said that "the Aborigines at Tarcutta were always friendly but her father never employed them regularly on the station. He certainly would not let them in or near the homestead." 'Some of the blacks assisted on the station at shearing time, and they were even given the carcasses of sheep which sometimes were drowned when they were being put through the trough after shearing'. 'I fear that sometimes a sheep was held under too long...but the blacks were not above eating drowned mutton.'

By 1835 Gundagai was the terminal point of settlement...from this point the great age of pastoral occupation...squatting...set in. A further effort was made in 1836, by Act of Council, to control the squatting boom, part by the imposition of annual licenses of A£10 each. Thus Mate became the largest landholder in the district. When the first map of the Port Phillip (later Melbourne) Road was printed in June 1836 two buildings were shown where Tarcutta is now located. Other settlers were located along the mid-reaches of Tarcutta Creek. The blacks were very active and numerous just then, and the reports of their depredations on the Murray were such as to deter Mr Mate from going further than Tarcutta.

With the introduction of "Depasturing Licenses' in 1837, Mate's name appeared in the NSW Government Gazette as a landholder in the Murrumbidgee-Southern and Yass districts.

Hambledon homestead is one of the earliest buildings in this part of the state. The first house was only a wattle and daub hut, without floorboards, but by 15th June 1839 Mate had an Inn, a Store and an established sheep station by the creek. He became a licensed publican on 1 July 1839 for his "Tarcutta Inn". His Store Book for 1839, found in the ceiling at Hambledon, gives a list of the large stock of goods available from the general store in 1839. The store became an important coaching station in an extensive network of mail services from the Upper Murray and Balranald. Its importance declined after the construction of the railway to Wagga Wagga in 1878.

The settlement of Tarcutta grew up around Mate's homestead.

Later, believed to be over the years 1847–9, a new house was built on the opposite side of the creek. This vertical slab, U-shaped homestead is still in use (1973) under the current name "Hambledon". It was probably in this building that Tarcutta's first Post Office was opened in 1849.

In 1848 landholders had to declare their holdings and define the boundaries thereof. Mate's Tarcutta land was described as named "Umuther and Toonga" (Umutbee), of 49,000 hectares (120,000 acres), with 800 cattle and 11,000 sheep, stretching from near Oberne to Lower Tarcutta, then south-west to near Keyamba, then east to Osborne. The length of boundary was 80 kilometres (50 mi). Other properties were described at Kulki, Tumberumba, Walla Walla and Oberne.

In 1850 the drought was broken with a flood. Also in 1850 Mate became a general storekeeper in Albury, when the Beechworth gold diggings opened. He became influential in Albury, later becoming Mayor. By 1894 this store, "Mates Ltd." had grown to become one of the largest provincial businesses in the colony, employing 50 hands in the 1870s and second to few such houses outside Sydney. He always continued to personally supervise and manage this business, while his sons attended to his station properties. These included Umutbee, Toonga, Kulki and Tumberumba.

Hambledon was managed in 1855 by Mate's son Alfred.

An 1858 survey of Mate's Umutbee shows a U-shaped building with a separate building at the rear and a line of smaller buildings on one side. In general, this approximates to the present large U-shaped slab homestead and brick kitchen block.

Mate's interest in the Robertson Land Act led him to seek election to Parliament as the Member for Hume. He was returned to oppose the Robertson Land policy, being in favour of confining free settlement to the 19 old counties. He was a member of the New South Wales Legislative Assembly from 15 December 1860 until 15 November 1869. While in the House, Mate succeeded in inscribing on the statute book the useful Act dealing with the "Careless use of Fire". He also assisted in passing the Public Schools Act of 1866 and supported the Martin-Parkes administration. Also during his term he was gazetted a Magistrate of the Territory.

Early in 1872 a special correspondent of the Town & Country Journal visited Tarcutta describing:

Tarcutta is a fine station on the Tarcutta Creek, and carries both cattle and sheep. The residence of the hospitable owner is near the main southern road. The grounds are planted with choice trees, shrubs, and flowers, which give the place a most pleasing appearance. Commencing with all sorts of beautiful roses, fuchsias and other flowers, under the immediate care of the ladies of the house. There were also, rearing their lofty heads, poplars, willows, acacias and elms. Further rambling showed fruits in abundance, inclusive of oranges and among the shrubs the mulberry was conspicuous. While looking at the latter I was shown some excellent specimens of silk, quite equal to those exhibited in Sydney a few months ago. This was prepared by one of the ladies of Mr Mate's family. Arrowroot growing well next passed under notice, and there were fine fields of planter's friend flourishing amazingly beside paddocks of maize. Mr Mate has expended many thousands of pounds on improvements. The area of the station is over 70,000 acres and nearly 8000 acres are purchased; and now it carries about 10,000 sheep and 1000 head of cattle. The cattle...are pictures of good breeding, and their glossy skins and well shaped quarters are the talk of the district! Their ancestors mostly belonged to the Purple blood, and their imported sire, Lucifer, was owned by Mr Mate. In the centre of one of the larger paddocks half a mile from the house I was shown a wash pen for warm and cold water, constructed on a good principle. The water is obtained by means of a race from Tarcutta Creek. Opposite the home station there is a large brick hotel, with full stables, called "The Horse and Jockey"...Immediately at the rear of the residence there is a large swamp called "Umutbee". It is 8 miles in length from NW to SE. This swamp years ago was covered with rushes which looked like fields of growing grain. From Tarcutta Creek have been taken large eels, which upsets the theory that they are only to be found in eastern waters'.

Another reporter in February 1879 wrote: "Tarcutta is very quiet, and being now off the main coach road to Albury and Melbourne, little happens worth recording." This was soon after the opening of the Wagga Wagga railway station.

After his wife Maria died in 1877 he left Tarcutta to live in Albury. In 1882 he remarried. Florence Ada Mate (née Brown) had come to the Ovens diggings with her father. In 1884 a daughter was born. From 1886 to 1889 Mate was an Alderman of Albury Council and in 1888 he became Mayor. At Brae Springs, Walla Walla, he built a fine residence where he retired and he died at Manly on 22 July 1894.

Mate's children appear to be as follows: Sopia (1836); Thomas (?), Annie (1840); William (1842); Frederick (1844); Emily Ann (1849), Alfred (1851); Maria (?) and Florence (1884).

The whole of the Tarcutta, Oberne and Humula areas were completely burnt out in January 1905, due to fence-high red and kangaroo grass through the dead timber.

1914 was among the driest season recorded, other dry years were 1896, 1902, 1929, 1940 and 1944.

In 1938-9 Tarcutta Creek dried up at the bridge and even the Murrumbidgee ceased to flow. 1916, 1917, 1923, 1932, 1934, 1950, 1952, 1956 and 1959 all recorded floods. 1940 and 1952 recorded fires in or around Tarcutta areas.

Amongst later owners of Hambledon were Henry Tyson "The King" and Charles Owen Lloyd-Jones. The present owner is best known as an Olympic equestrian. The restoration of this building was assisted by a $50,000 loan made available from the Heritage Conservation Fund in 1982. As one of the conditions attached to the assistance, the owner applied to the Minister for the making of a Permanent Conservation Order over the item.

== Description ==
The building is constructed of vertical slabs and is U-shaped; the northern wing dates from the 1837 period.

An 1858 survey of Mate's Umutbee shows a U-shaped building with a separate building at the rear and a line of smaller buildings on one side. In general, this approximates to the present large U-shaped slab homestead and brick kitchen block.

Hambledon's slab construction is of great interest, especially as the building is larger than slab buildings generally. The building is of considerable technical interest for its slab construction. It is an important example of vernacular timber building and is larger than many other slab structures. Hambledon is the largest-surviving slab homestead in Southern NSW.

The building is of vertical slabs and U-shaped; the northern wing dates from the 1837 period. The vertical adzed timber slabs fit into a channel in the bottom sleeper and are held in place at the top plate by a batten.

Single storey, the house has a hip roof which is clad with corrugated iron (the earlier shingles remain under the iron). A verandah, which has a separate iron roof to the main roof, runs across the front wall and down one side. The slabs are painted white.

Interior walls are timber stud covered on both sides with lathe and mud plaster. The front door is six panelled and has a brass knocker.

At the rear a detached brick kitchen faces the internal courtyard. Chimneys have some slight corbelling.

=== Condition ===
As at 26 May 2008, the complex comprises:

- a brick outbuilding -
- a kitchen: sandstock brick walls show evidence of salt-damp and some drainage problems (1981);
- a weatherboard shed west of kitchen: reasonable condition; needs new gutters (1981)
- homestead (slab): good - the building has been slightly changed over the years with more modern facilities such as kitchens and bathrooms required within the main house, only slight modifications and reinstatement of contemporary detail is required to restore Hambledon fully (1981,1982).

=== Modifications and dates ===
- 1836-7 – The first house was only a wattle and daub hut, without floorboards
- 1839 – Mate had an inn, a store
- 1847-9 – A new house was built on the opposite side of the creek; a vertical slab, U-shaped homestead
- 1850 – Flood
- 1872 – A correspondent of the Town & Country Journal described:

Tarcutta is a fine station on the Tarcutta Creek, and carries both cattle and sheep. The residence of the hospitable owner is near the main southern road. The grounds are planted with choice trees, shrubs, and flowers, which give the place a most pleasing appearance. Commencing with all sorts of beautiful roses, fuchsias and other flowers, under the immediate care of the ladies of the house. There were also, rearing their lofty heads, poplars, willows, acacias and elms. Further rambling showed fruits in abundance, inclusive of oranges and among the shrubs the mulberry was conspicuous. While looking at the latter I was shown some excellent specimens of silk, quite equal to those exhibited in Sydney a few months ago. This was prepared by one of the ladies of Mr Mate's family. Arrowroot growing well next passed under notice, and there were fine fields of planter's friend flourishing amazingly beside paddocks of maize. Mr Mate has expended many thousands of pounds on improvements. The area of the station is over 70,000 acres and nearly 8000 acres are purchased; and now it carries about 10,000 sheep and 1000 head of cattle. The cattle...are pictures of good breeding, and their glossy skins and well shaped quarters are the talk of the district! Their ancestors mostly belonged to the Purple blood, and their imported sire, Lucifer, was owned by Mr Mate. In the centre of one of the larger paddocks half a mile from the house I was shown a wash pen for warm and cold water, constructed on a good principle. The water is obtained by means of a race from Tarcutta Creek. Opposite the home station there is a large brick hotel, with full stables, called "The Horse and Jockey".

- 1958 – Southern Riverina County Council erected an 11 kiloelectronvolts (1.8 fJ) mains power line across part of the front garden of the property, to extend power supply to Hambledon and to the town of Tarcutta and adjacent rural areas.
- 1982-3 – Restoration of the homestead and an adjoining brick outbuilding with assistance of a $50,000 loan.
- 8/1983 – Flood damage to the property - due to damage to a nearby levee and poor construction of its valves.
- 1984 – Discussion between County Council and Heritage Branch re pruning of ornamental pine trees planted near 11 kiloelectronvolts (1.8 fJ) mains power line in front of property. Heritage Branch recommended relocation of the line to the road frontage or rear of the property.
- 9/1984 – The County Council decided to move the power lines to the rear of the property.
- undated – Homestead burnt down (to confirm).

== Heritage listing ==
Hambledon Homestead was listed on the New South Wales State Heritage Register on 2 April 1999.

== See also ==
- Australian residential architectural styles
