= Mount Horeb, New South Wales =

Rural locality in the Riverina region of New South Wales

Mount Horeb
- Town
- Interactive map of Mount Horeb
- Coordinates: 35°12′23.8″S 148°02′14.6″E
- Country: Australia
- State: New South Wales
- Region: Riverina
- LGA: Snowy Valleys Council
- Location: 80 km (50 mi) E of Wagga Wagga; 34 km (21 mi) W of Tumut, New South Wales; 394 km (245 mi) SW of Sydney

Government
  - State electorate: Wagga Wagga
  - Federal division: Riverina

Population
  - Total: 22 (2021 census)
- Postcode: 2729
- County: Wyndham
- Parish: Calafat (right bank of Adelong Creek), Euadera (left bank of Adelong Creek)
Localities around Mount Horeb
Tumblong	Tumblong	South Gundagai
Mount Adrah	Mount Horeb	Minjary
Bangadang	Grahamstown	Califat

Mount Horeb is a rural locality in the Riverina region of New South Wales, Australia. It lies astride the road route between Tumblong and Adelong. There is a now abandoned railway station, of the same name, that was used to access nearby Adelong. The railway station and the site of a failed private township development lie close to the left bank of Adelong Creek, which flows through the locality. The confluence of Califat Creek and Adelong Creek lies within the locality.

The area now known as Mount Horeb lies within the traditional land of Wiradjuri people. The locality takes its settler name from the 'Mount Horeb' sheep run, which in turn took its name from the biblical Mount Horeb.

The now disused Tumut branch line passes through the locality. The railway station at Mount Horeb opened in 1903, when the railway extension from Gundagai to Tumut opened. The platform at Mount Horeb railway station was 40 m long, and had a wooden station building, and there was a crossing loop and goods siding with a goods shed. There was a second railway stop within the original sheep run, a platform known as Califat Platform, but its former location now lies slightly outside the modern-day locality's boundaries.

The sheep run, 'Mount Horeb', was bought by Andrew Grain, in 1878. It was bought during 1906, by, Davies and Kershaw, who had operated two pump gold dredges on Adelong Creek. They kept 6,000 acres and sold the remainder. There was a subdivision of 13,700 acres into farms and township allotments, which were put up for sale at auction on 22 November 1906. A report of the auction sale reported that all 63 town allotments had been sold, 8,000 acres of land had been sold at auction, with 5,700 acres stated to have immediately been placed under offer. However, the township seems never to have developed. After WWI, other closer settlement occurred instead around Batlow, and a proposed branch railway from Mount Horeb did not eventuate.

The railway station sign read, "Mount Horeb Change Here For Adelong." The mining town of Adelong was reportedly around four miles distant by road from the new station. and Grahamstown was closer. However, with the gold mines at Adelong in decline, a 1904 proposal for a seven mile long branch railway line linking Mount Horeb to Adelong, with an intermediate station at Shephardstown—a small mining settlement close to Grahamstown—did not proceed. In 1911, a branch railway from Mount Horeb to Tumbarumba via Adelong was advocated. The branch line proposal was reconsidered in 1913, but lost out to another branch line from Gilmore to Batlow. The Tumbarumba branch railway route ran instead from Wagga Wagga; the first leg opened in 1917 and the last extension, from Humula, in 1921. Mount Horeb had lost its chance to become a railway junction, and with it probably its chance to be a significant settlement.

It was designated as a village in 1970, and it became a locality in 1996. In 2021, just twelve dwellings were counted within the locality's boundaries.

Mount Horeb lies downstream of Adelong and Grahamstown, where there were large quartz reefs containing gold, which shed alluvial gold into nearby streams. Gold dredges operated, on Adelong Creek, at Mount Horeb, at least into the mid 1930s.

Postmark

There was a school at Mount Horeb, between May 1912 and March 1929. The locality is now served by a school bus route, S605, from Tumut via Adelong.

There once was a post office there, named Mount Horeb, and mail for Adelong and Grahamstown was sent via the railway station and Mount Horeb Post Office, until at least 1965.

The end of railway operations came, after flood damage to the line, near Cootamundra, in 1984. Remnants of the railway still exist at the site of the old Mount Horeb railway station.

Mount Horeb's history is one of the subjects of the book Along the Creek, revisited: Shepardstown, Grahamstown, Mount Horeb.
