= Book Book =

- Town
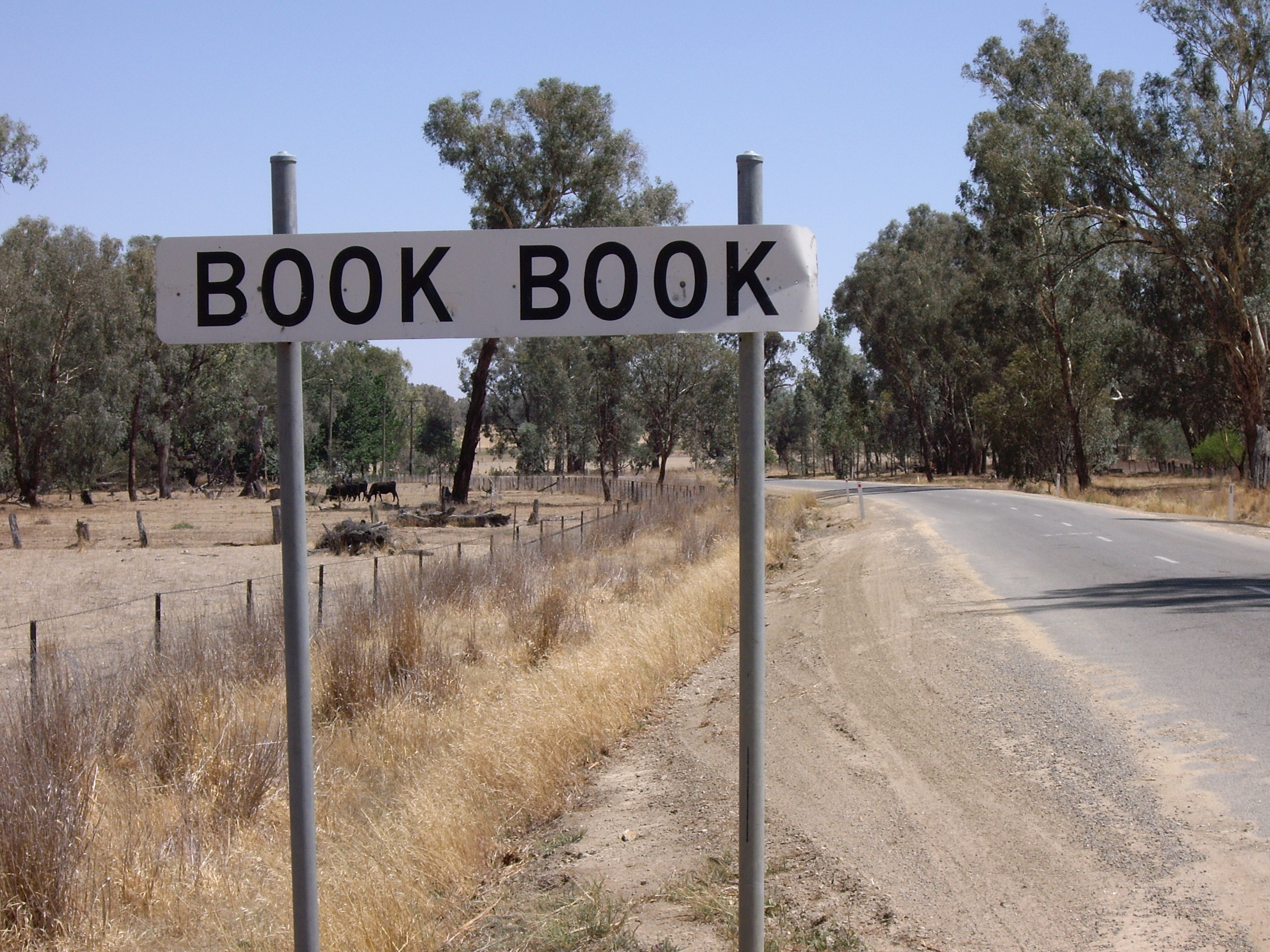
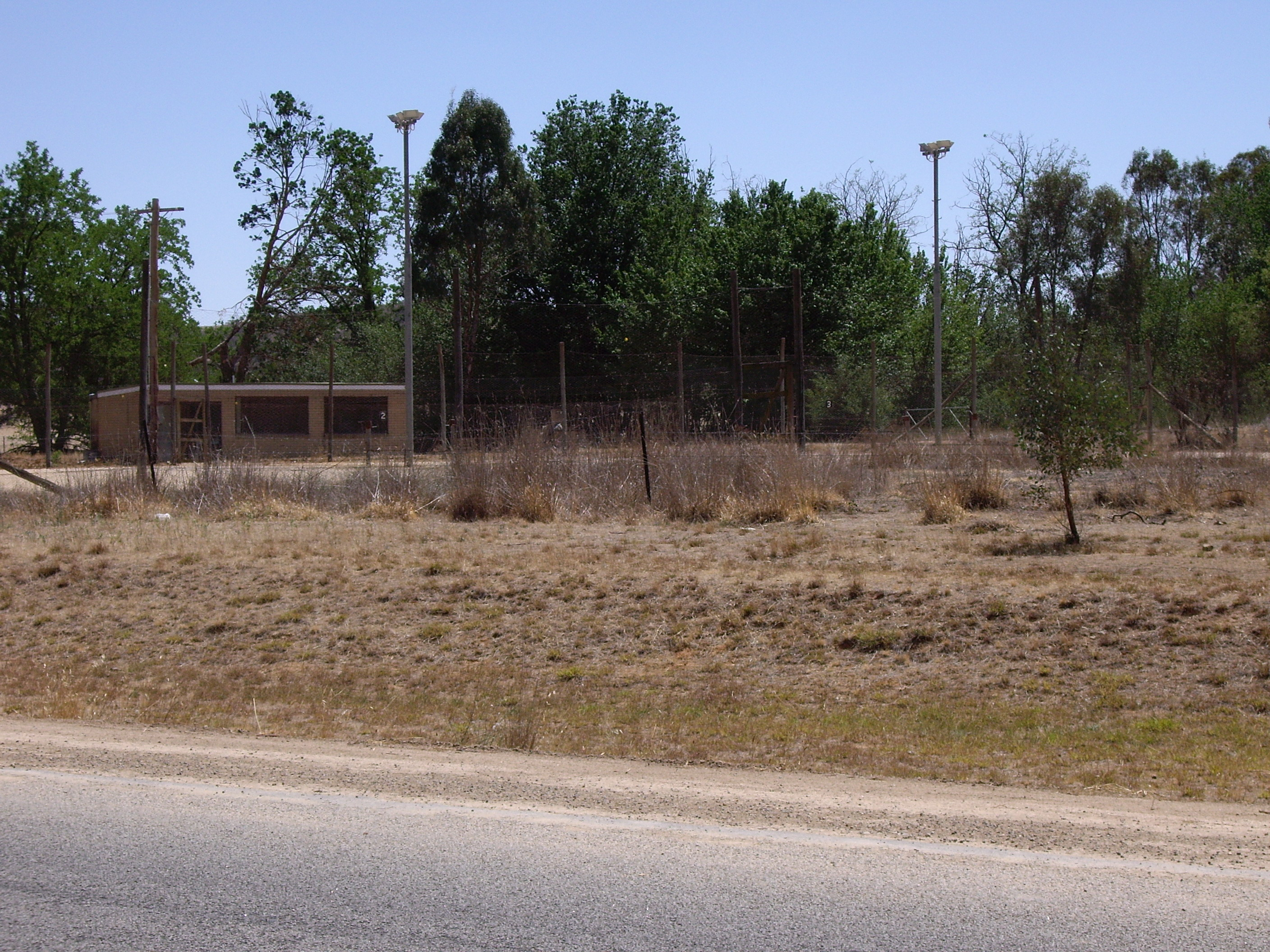
- Entering Book Book Book Book Tennis Courts

- Coordinates: 35°22′10″S 147°33′48″E
- Country: Australia
- State: New South Wales
- LGA: City of Wagga Wagga
- Location: 455 km (283 mi) from Sydney; 35 km (22 mi) from Wagga Wagga; 14 km (8.7 mi) from Ladysmith; 11 km (6.8 mi) from Kyeamba

Government
  - State electorate: Wagga Wagga
- Elevation: 225 m (738 ft)

Population
  - Total: 130 (SAL 2021)
- Postcode: 2650
- County: Wynyard

Book Book is a rural community in the central east part of the Riverina, in New South Wales. It is about 12 km (7 mi) north of Kyeamba and 15 km (9 mi) south of Ladysmith.

The area now known as Book Book lies on the traditional lands of the Wiradjuri people.

Book Book exists now only through a set of old tennis courts and the telephone exchange that sits just off the Tumbarumba road. The tennis courts were used by a local tennis club. There was also a village hall at which dances and other social events were held. There were also Anglican church services held there.

There was a public school at Book Book that first opened as a 'half-time' school in October 1924 and closed in December 1987.
