= Carabost =

- Town
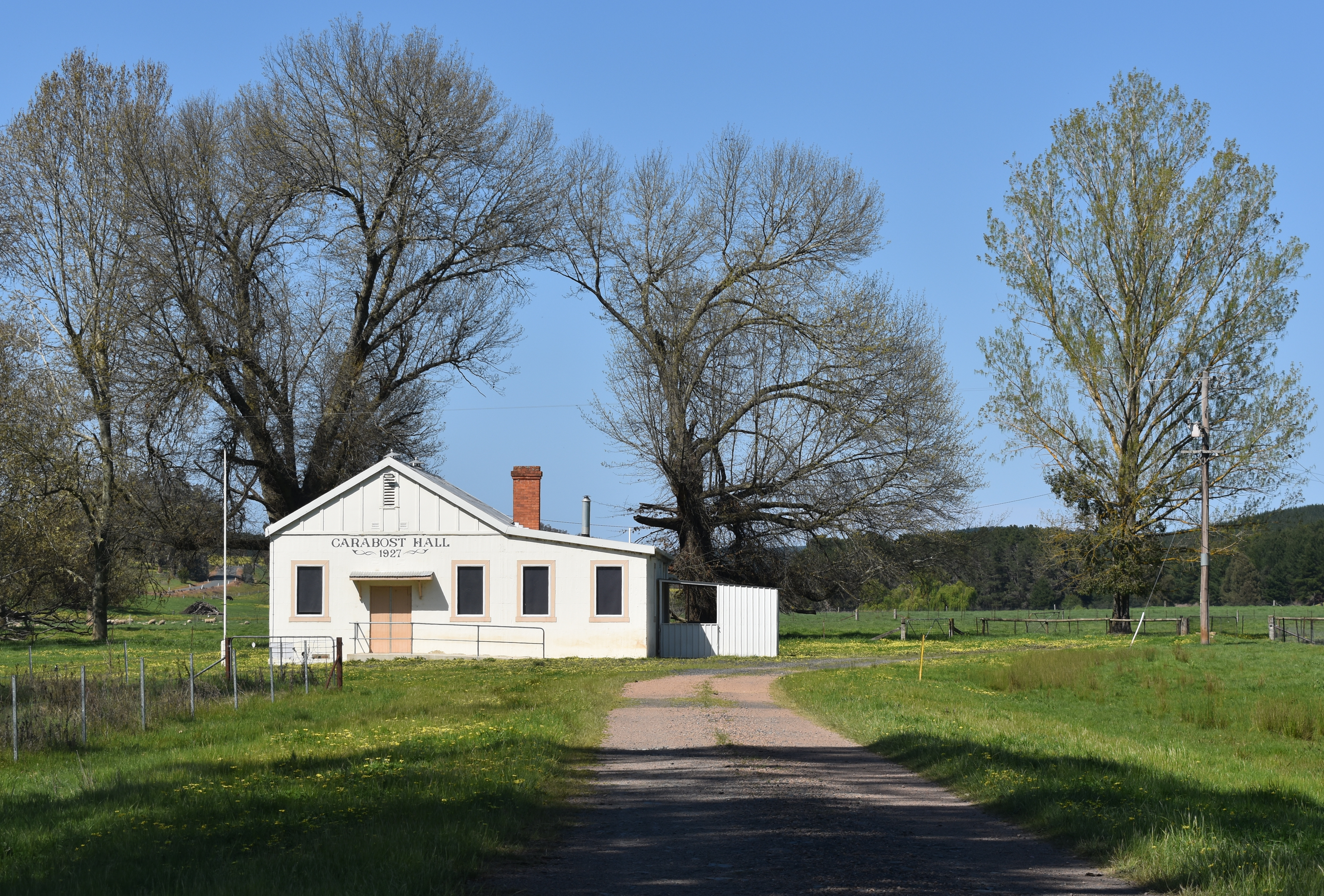
- Carabost Hall, 2020

- Coordinates: 35°36′S 147°43′E
- Country: Australia
- State: New South Wales
- Location: 468 km (291 mi) from Sydney; 71 km (44 mi) from Wagga Wagga; 22 km (14 mi) from Kyeamba; 16 km (9.9 mi) from Rosewood

Government
  - State electorate: Albury
  - Federal division: Farrer
- Elevation: 551 m (1,808 ft)

Population
  - Total: 67 (SAL 2021)
- Postcode: 2650
- County: Wynyard
- Mean max temp: 18.4 °C (65.1 °F)
- Mean min temp: 5.7 °C (42.3 °F)
- Annual rainfall: 966.5 mm (38.05 in)

Carabost is a foresting community in the southeast part of the Riverina. It is about 16 kilometres north west of Rosewood and 22 kilometres southeast of Kyeamba.

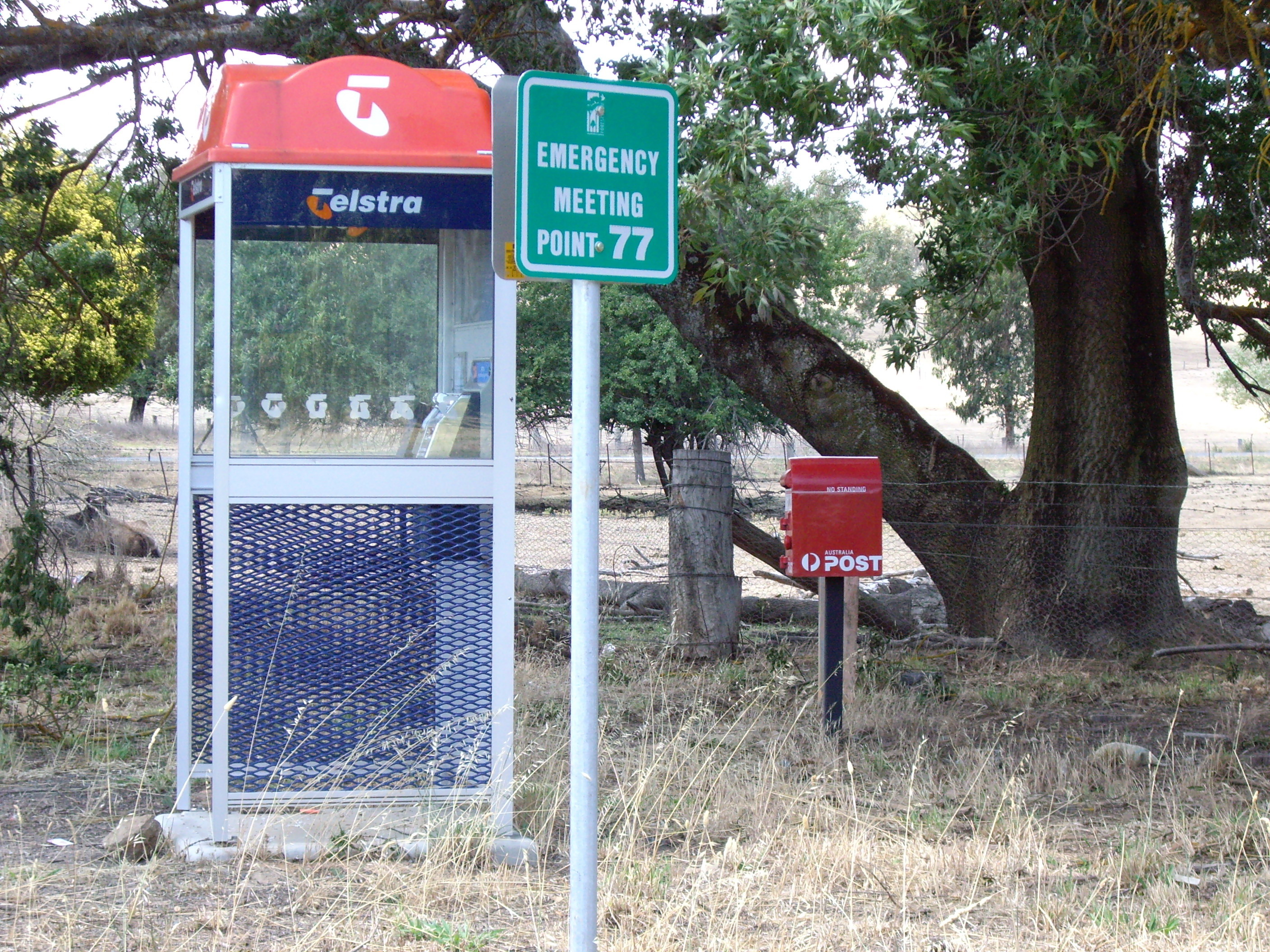
Facilities at Carabost

Carabost is on the Tumbarumba Road near the location of the Carabost National Forest – a large Pine Plantation in the area. The only facilities available in the area, other than the Carabost Town Hall built in 1927, and a Fire Brigade Shed, is a public telephone box and a post box – both at the same location as the district emergency gathering point which is used in the case of forest fire or similar emergency.

Carabost is the Gaelic form of Carbost on the Scottish island of Skye and means Copse farm.

Carabost Post Office opened on 1 March 1879, and it closed on 4 March 1897. It then reopened on 1 January 1915 and was closed once again on 27 January 1968

Gold was known to exist in the area, from at least the late 1880s, but Carabost was not as well known for gold, as the neighbouring mining areas of Humula and Tumbarumba. During the 1920s, parts of the locality of Carabost were mined for gold by dredging.

== Climate ==
Being the first of the higher ground on the South West Slopes in a westerly wind, the region experiences cool maximum temperatures relative to its altitude (particularly in winter), averaging just 9.1 °C (48.4 °F) in July. The site was located in a pine plantation at 580 metres (1,900 ft) above sea level, operated from 1938 until 1969 by the Carabost Forest Headquarters.

Climate data for Carabost Forest Headquarters (1938–1969, rainfall 1938–1997); 580 m AMSL; 35.65° S, 147.80° E
Month	Jan	Feb	Mar	Apr	May	Jun	Jul	Aug	Sep	Oct	Nov	Dec	Year
Mean daily maximum °C (°F)	28.0 (82.4)	27.2 (81.0)	24.1 (75.4)	18.7 (65.7)	13.7 (56.7)	10.8 (51.4)	9.1 (48.4)	10.8 (51.4)	14.3 (57.7)	18.0 (64.4)	21.1 (70.0)	25.4 (77.7)	18.4 (65.2)
Mean daily minimum °C (°F)	11.0 (51.8)	11.2 (52.2)	9.0 (48.2)	5.6 (42.1)	3.2 (37.8)	1.7 (35.1)	0.2 (32.4)	1.7 (35.1)	3.2 (37.8)	5.5 (41.9)	7.0 (44.6)	9.0 (48.2)	5.7 (42.3)
Average precipitation mm (inches)	56.4 (2.22)	48.6 (1.91)	61.2 (2.41)	72.6 (2.86)	96.4 (3.80)	92.8 (3.65)	112.5 (4.43)	107.6 (4.24)	84.4 (3.32)	100.1 (3.94)	70.5 (2.78)	60.1 (2.37)	966.5 (38.05)
Average precipitation days (≥ 0.2 mm)	5.1	4.7	5.4	7.0	9.7	10.7	12.6	13.0	10.1	10.1	7.8	6.2	102.4
Source: Australian Bureau of Meteorology; Carabost Forest Headquarters
