= Alfredton =

There are at least two places called Alfredton:

- Alfredton, Victoria in Australia
- Alfredton, New Zealand

== See also ==
- Alfreton, Derbyshire, England
- Alfredtown, New South Wales, Australia
