= Ladysmith, New South Wales =

Ladysmith
- Town
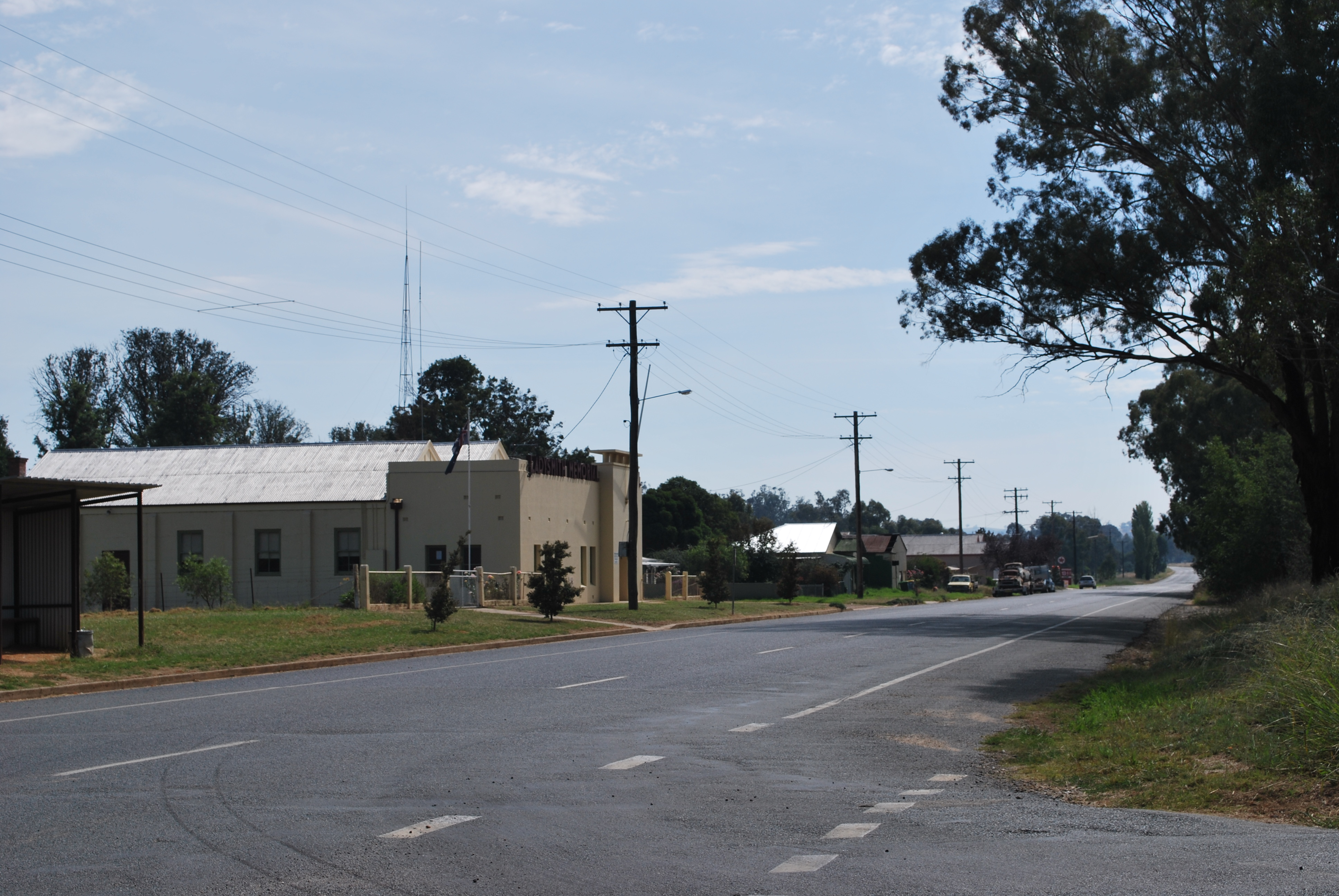
- Tumbarumba Road, the main street of Ladysmith, 2010

- Coordinates: 35°12′0″S 147°30′0″E
- Country: Australia
- State: New South Wales
- LGA: City of Wagga Wagga
- Location: 19 km (12 mi) from Wagga Wagga; 27 km (17 mi) from Kyeamba

Government
  - State electorate: Wagga Wagga
  - Federal division: Riverina
- Elevation: 233 m (764 ft)

Population
  - Total: 215 (2021 census)
- Postcode: 2652
- County: Wynyard
- Parish: Tywong

Ladysmith is a village approximately 19 km east of Wagga Wagga in the Riverina region of New South Wales, Australia. At the 2021 census, Ladysmith had a population of 215.

Ladysmith was formerly within the Shire of Kyeamba until 1 January 1981 when the Shire was amalgamated with the Shire of Mitchell into the City of Wagga Wagga.

The disused Wagga Wagga to Tumbarumba railway runs through Ladysmith. The Ladysmith railway station heritage precinct is maintained by the Wagga Wagga-based railway preservation group, Ladysmith Tourist Railway. After a 20-year hiatus due to insurance difficulties, the group began operating rail trike rides on a short section of the former Tumbarumba line at Ladysmith.

The Ladysmith post office was opened on 20 November 1899. The district was formerly called Alfredtown, but the name was changed after the community petitioned to rename it Ladysmith, in honour of Sarah Ann Smith (née Apps), for all the work her family had done within their community. She and her husband, Charles Thomas Smith, resided at “Green Meadow”. Allredtown remained in use as the name of a nearby locality.

Ladysmith is also the name of a South African town which, in late October 1899, during the Second Boer War, was the site of the Battle of Ladysmith, as well as the Siege of Ladysmith, from 2 November 1899 to 28 February 1900. Troops from New South Wales were participating in the war by November 1899.

The store and post office agency closed on 31 March 2023. As of 2024 Ladysmith is undergoing a flood study to identify future growth area.

== Gallery ==
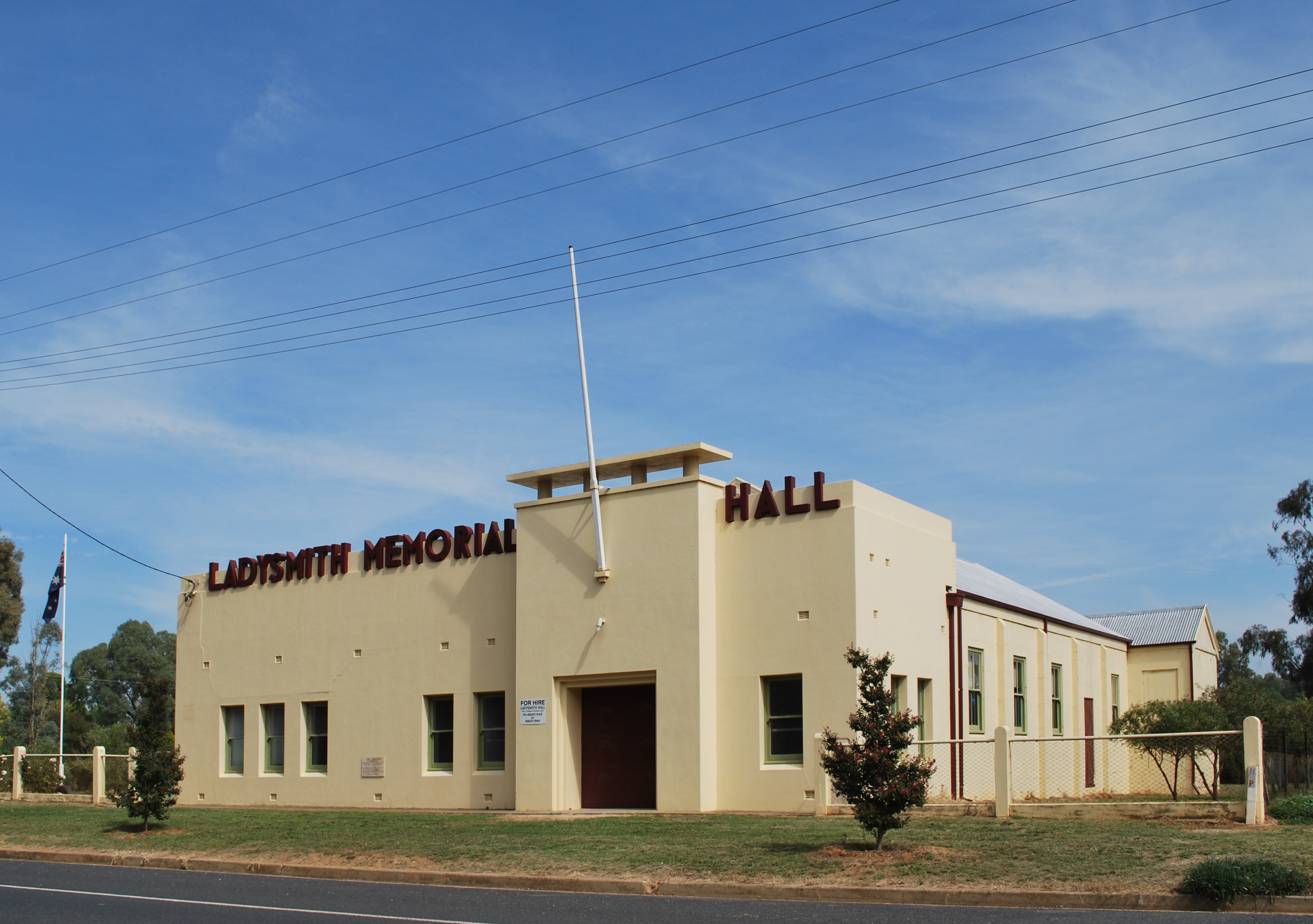
Ladysmith Memorial Hall, 2010

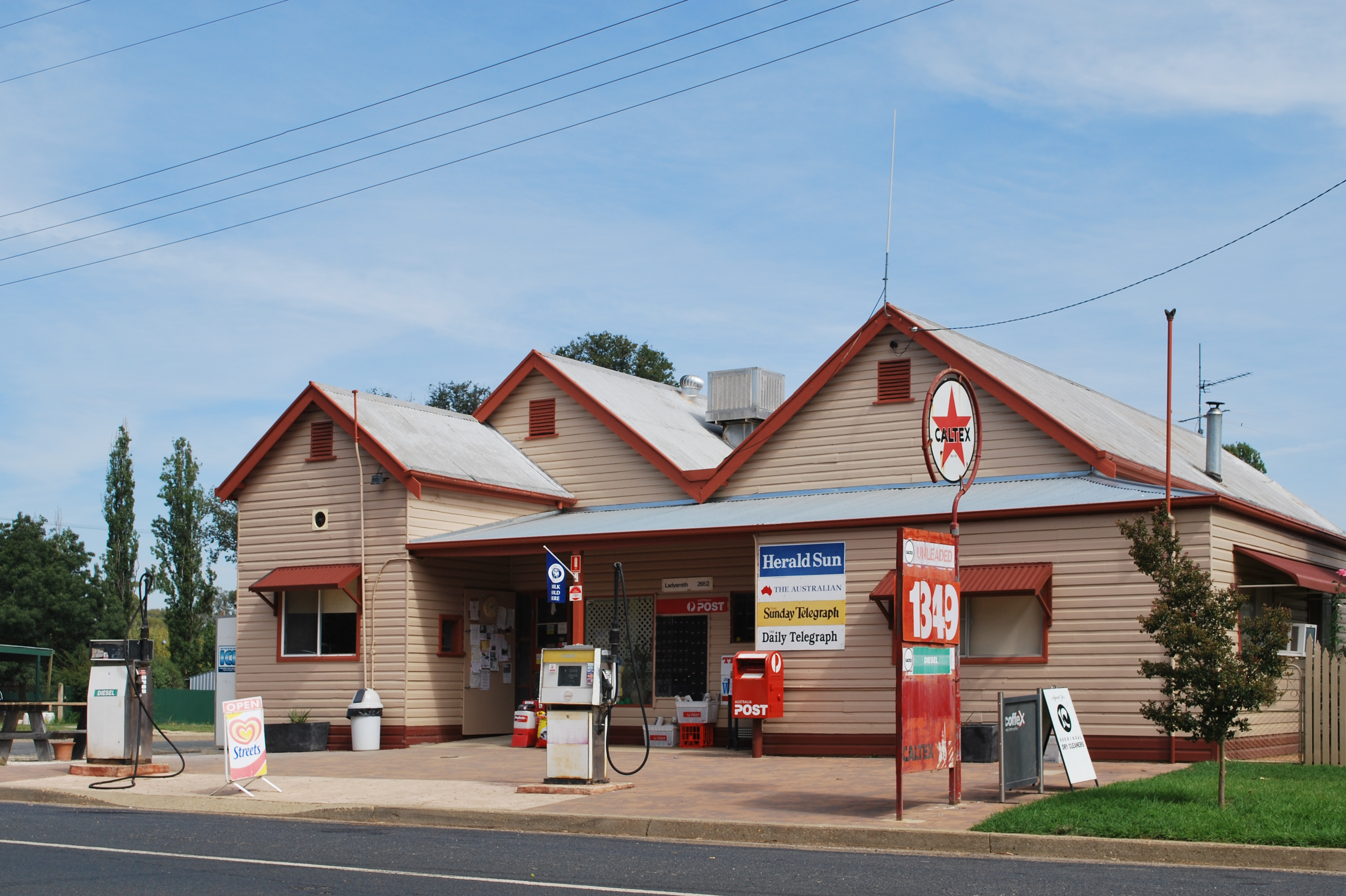
General store and post office, 2010

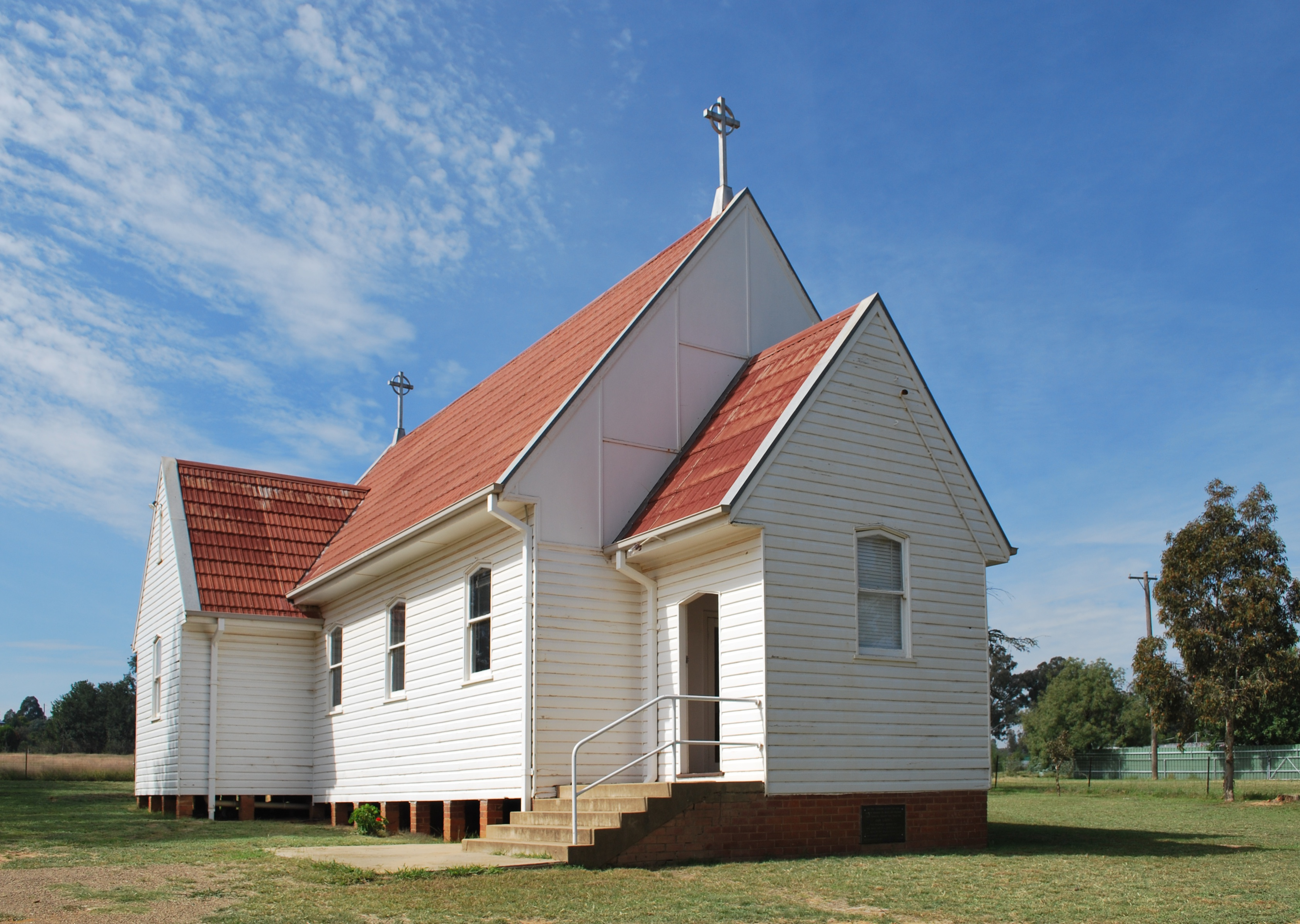
Our Lady's Roman Catholic Church, 2010

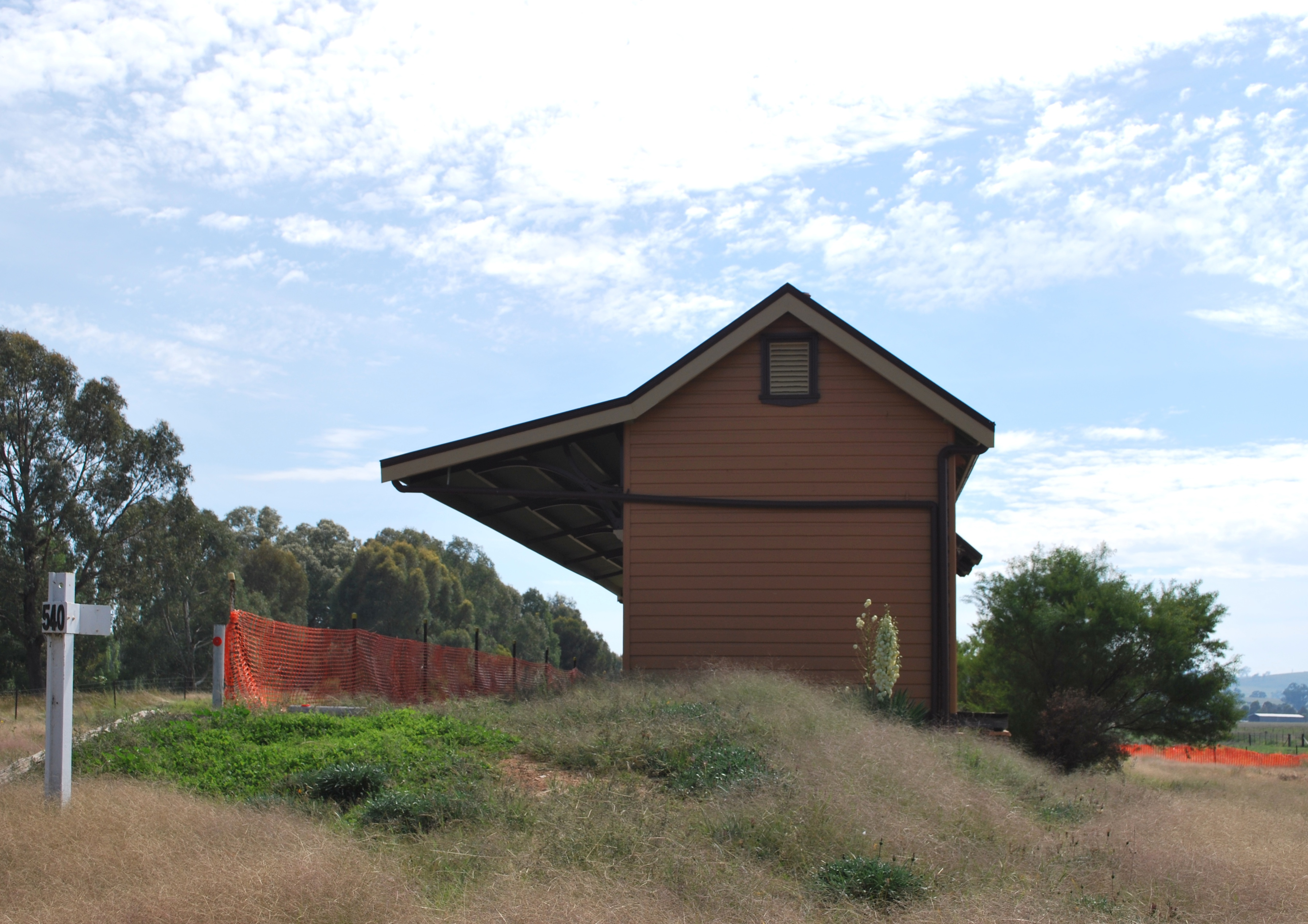
Ladysmith Railway Station, 2010
