= Oberne, New South Wales =

Oberne New South Wales
- Coordinates: 35°24′51″S 147°50′34″E
- Postcode(s): 2650
- Elevation: 375 m (1,230 ft)
- Location: 10 km (6 mi) from Humula; 18 km (11 mi) from Tarcutta
- LGA(s): City of Wagga Wagga
- County: Wynyard
- State electorate(s): Wagga Wagga

Oberne is a rural community in the eastern part of the Riverina. It is situated about 10 kilometres north east of Humula and 18 kilometres south of Tarcutta.

Oberne Creek Post Office opened on 1 April 1916 and closed in 1968.
