= Tumblong, New South Wales =

Tumblong New South Wales
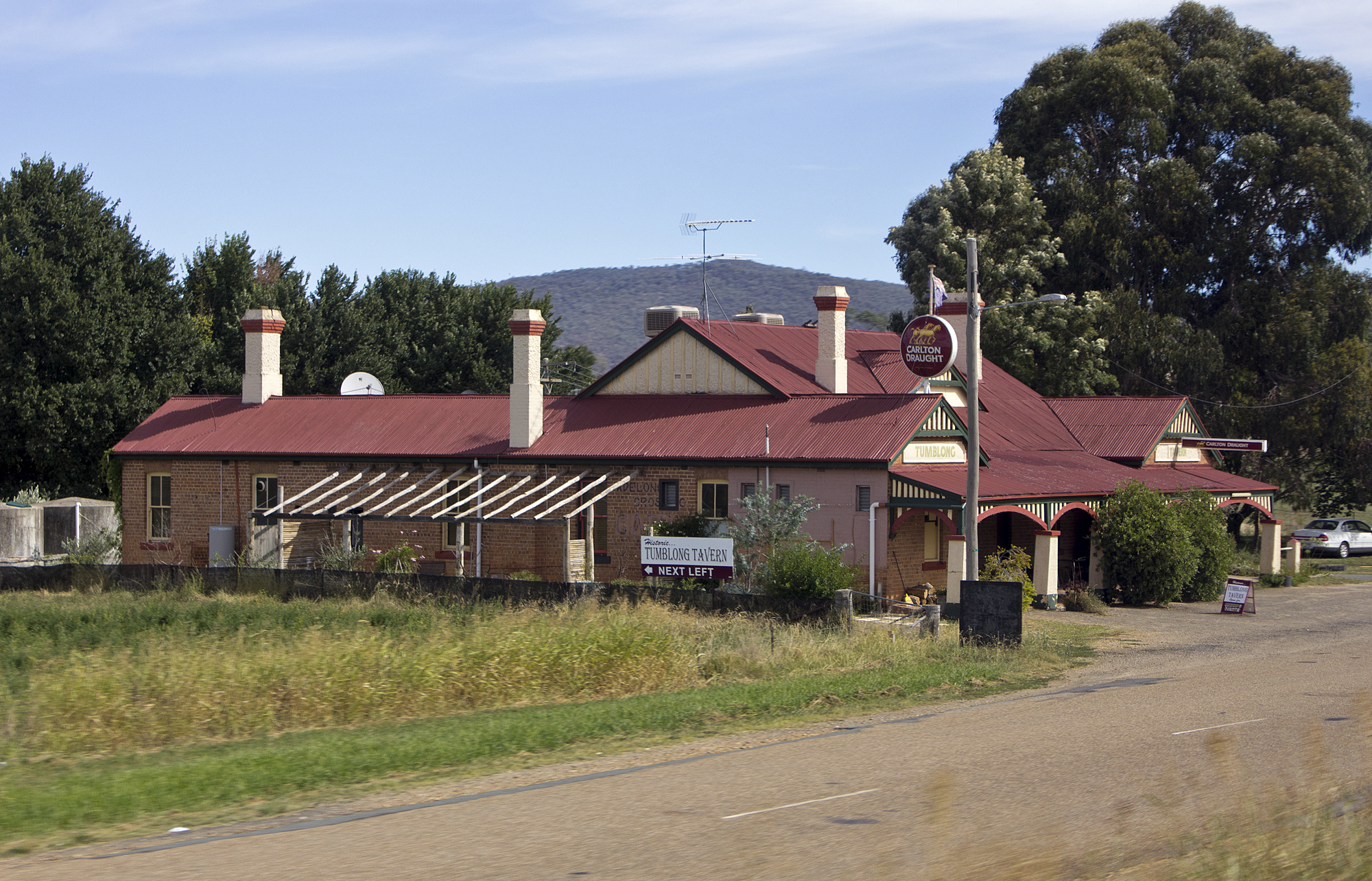
- Tumblong Tavern

- Coordinates: 35°09′S 148°00′E
- Population: 225 (SAL 2021)
- Postcode(s): 2729
- Elevation: 303 m (994 ft)
- Location: 18 km (11 mi) from Mundarlo; 25 km (16 mi) from Adelong; 30 km (19 mi) from Tarcutta
- LGA(s): Cootamundra–Gundagai Regional Council
- County: Wynyard
- State electorate(s): Cootamundra
- Federal division(s): Riverina

Tumblong is a village community in the central east part of the Riverina and situated about 18 kilometres (11 mi) south east from Mundarlo and 25 kilometres (16 mi) northwest of Adelong. It was known as Adelong Crossing or Adelong Crossing Place until 1913. At the 2011 census, Tumblong and the surrounding area had a population of 338.

== History ==
The area now known as Tumblong lies on the traditional lands of the Wiradjuri people.

Tumblong was first claimed around 1831 by Robert Pitt Jenkins (1814–59), the son of a wealthy colonial family. The squattage was a 25,000 acres (10,000 ha) property that he called "Bangus" Station. As with most squatters of the time, he would have had an overseer take care of the property. Jenkins had other land granted to him in 1831 in the Sydney area and also claimed "Bramballa" in the Marulan area at a similar time. Jenkins built a 10-room home on Bangus and moved his family to Bangus in 1848, becoming the magistrate in Gundagai until 1853 when he left the region for his mother's estate, Eagle Vale, near Campbelltown. Unable to sell the Bangus property and the 3,000 head of sheep, he let out the residence and it became a public house called the Bangus Inn. In 1856 he managed to sell the inn and an acre of land for £1,000 and in the same year was appointed as member of the NSW Legislative Council.

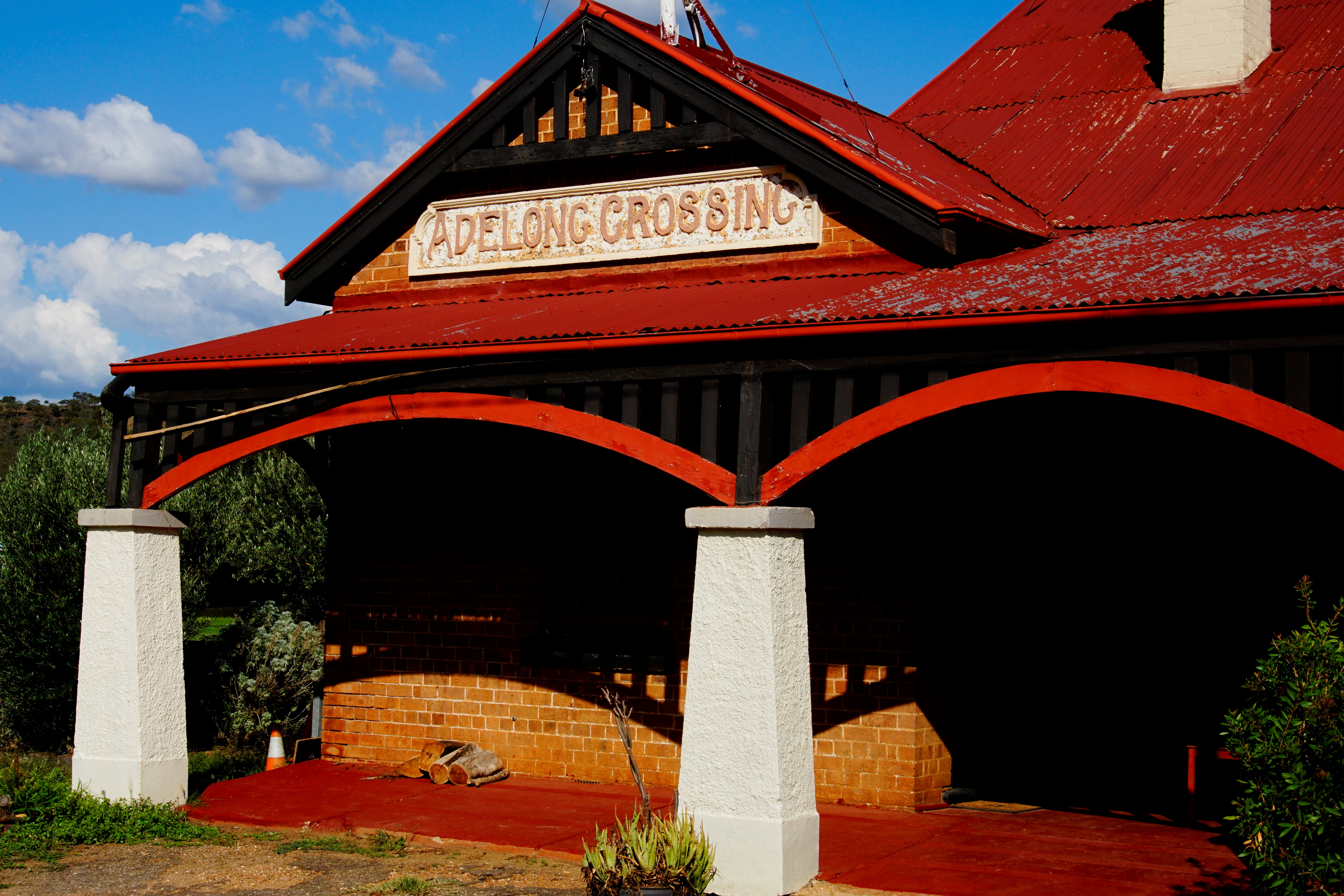
Tumblong Tavern. Previous name still visible

With the 1856 sale of the Bangus Inn the new owner renamed it the Home Hotel before William Williams of Adelong purchased the property in the 1870s. He built a new hotel called the Coach and Horses in 1873; this lasted until it was replaced in 1905 with the Adelong Crossing Hotel, currently the Tumblong Tavern.

In 1859, Robert Pitt Jenkins, his wife and four sons were lost in the sinking of Royal Charter off the English Coast, while going to visit his daughter Alice Jenkins who was at school in Paris at the time. Alice later inherited Bangus and it was sold off by her husband Hubert de Castella to finance his vineyards in Victoria.

In 1874, a flour mill known as the Victoria Flour Mill was opened at Adelong Crossing by William Williams. It was not a great success but seems to have operated sporadically, until around 1880. It was still standing, unused, in 1910.

Adelong Crossing Place was renamed Tumblong in 1913 to avoid confusion with the town of Adelong. The name came from the neighbouring property across the Adelong Creek originally owned by Henry Stuckey that he had named Tumblong.

The Adelong Crossing railway station opened in 1903, was renamed Tumblong in 1913, and closed in 1975. There was a 40m long platform and a siding serving stockyards with a loading bank. The railway line closed in 1984.

The Adelong Crossing school opened as a provisional school in 1869, became a public school in 1870, was renamed Tumblong in 1913, and closed in 1990.

Adelong Crossing Place Post Office opened on 1 August 1864, was renamed Tumblong on 15 April 1913, and closed on 30 November 1973.

== Today ==
Tumblong consists of a wrecking yard, a few private residences on the road to Adelong and a pub, one of only a few remaining directly on a part of a road called the Hume Highway, though another such pub is situated in Coolac.

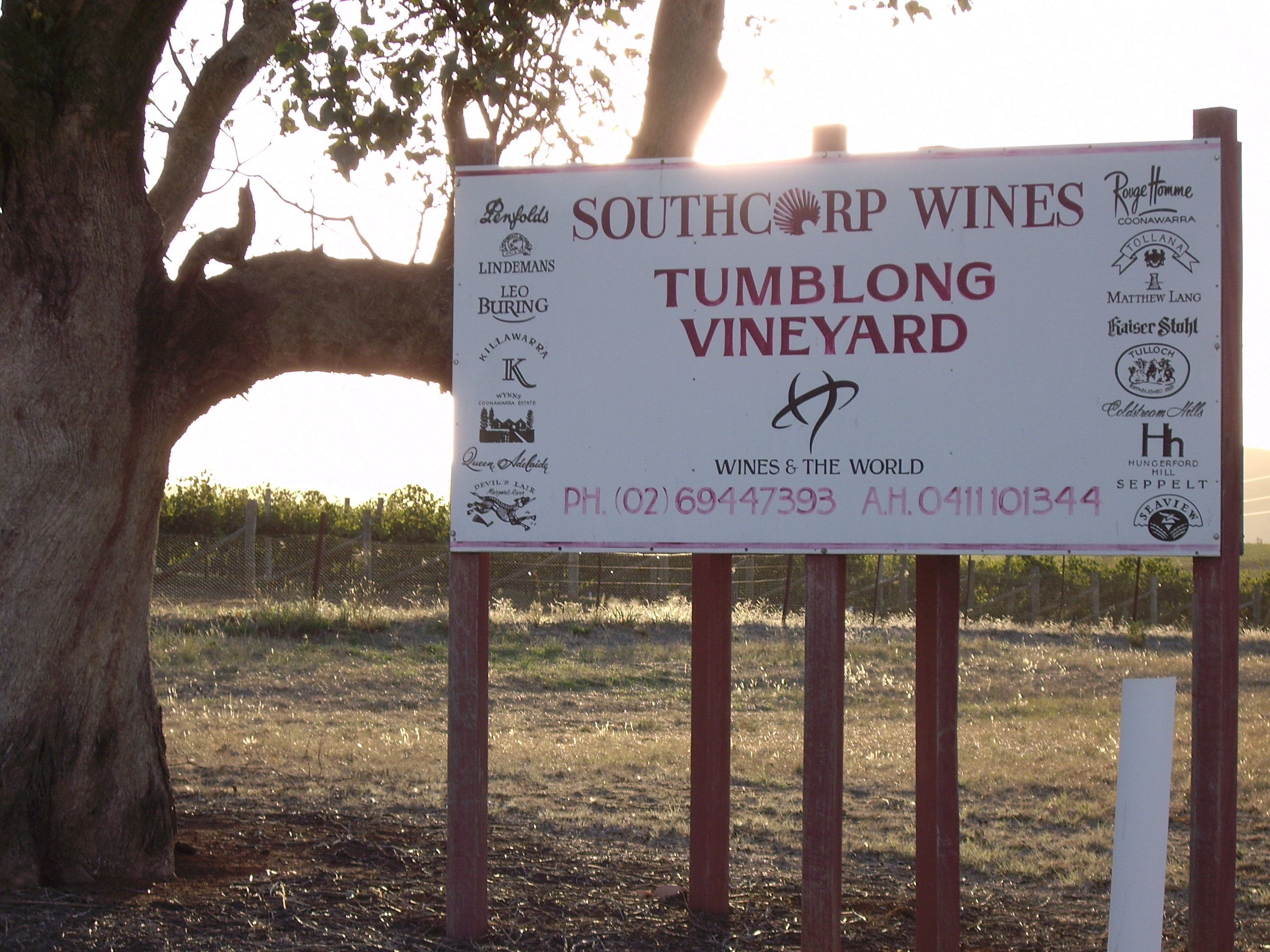
Tumblong Vineyard

The Tumblong area is also home to a reasonably large vineyard area which is a part of the Southcorp Wines group which includes well known Australian wine names such as Penfolds and Lindemans. The vineyard known as Tumblong Vineyard is on the Tumblong to Mundarlo road.
