= Tarcutta Hills Reserve =

Protected area in New South Wales, Australia

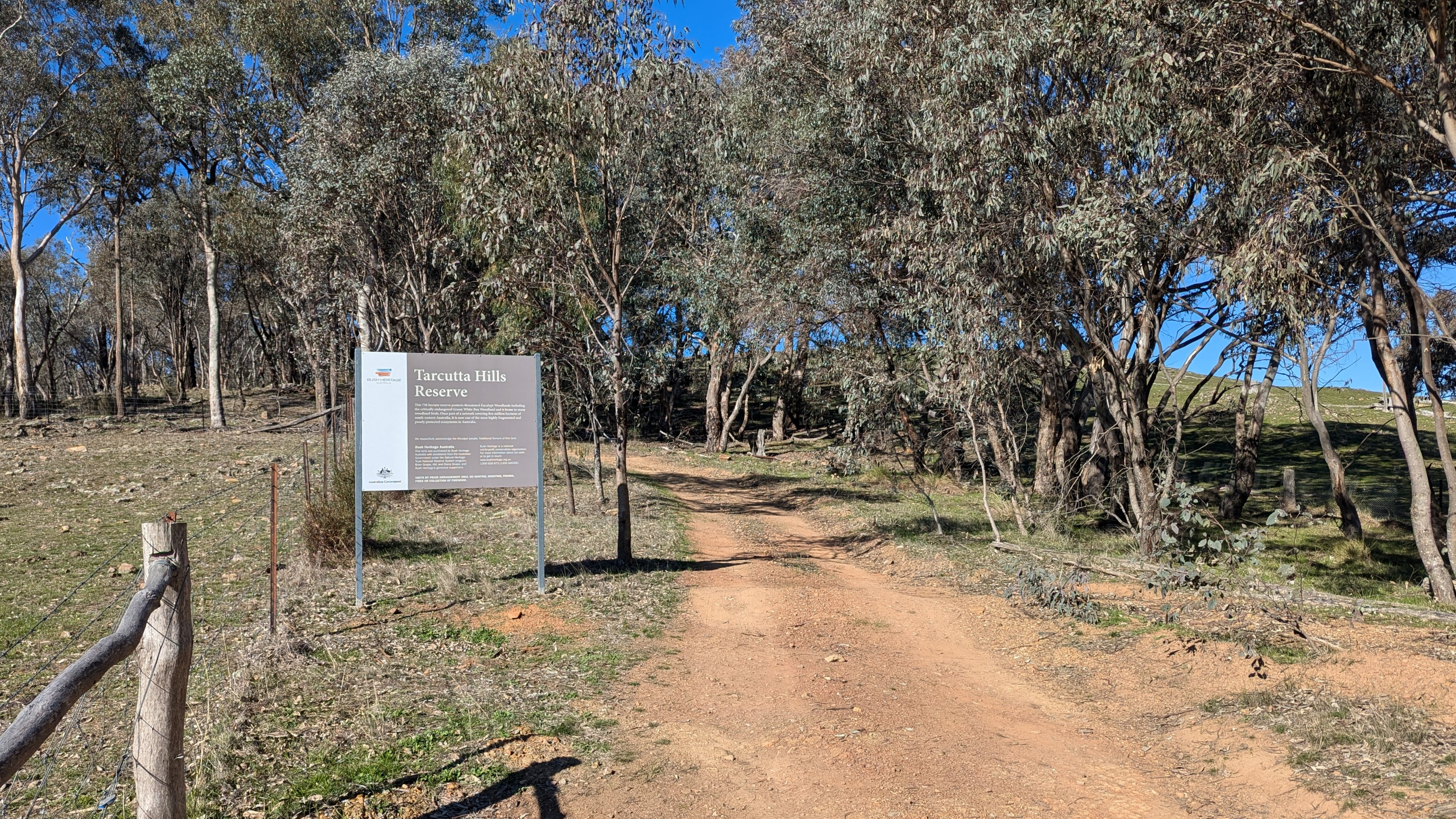

- Location within New South Wales
- Location: New South Wales
- Nearest city: Tarcutta, New South Wales
- Coordinates: 35.3707°S 147.7007°E
- Area: 7.38 km^{2} (2.85 sq mi)
- Established: 1999
- Governing body: Bush Heritage Australia
- Website: Official website

Tarcutta Hills Reserve is a 738-hectare (1,820-acre) nature reserve on the lower western slopes of the Great Dividing Range in central west New South Wales, Australia. It is 427 kilometres (265 mi) south-west of Sydney, close to the Hume Highway, and 15 kilometres (9.3 mi) south of Tarcutta. It is owned and managed by Bush Heritage Australia, which purchased it in 1999, and it is listed on the Register of the National Estate.

In late 2020, Bush Heritage purchased a 288-hectare (710-acre) parcel of land, adjacent to the northern boundary of the reserve, extending the total size of the reserve. The new block of land features a large and healthy example of white box-yellow box-Blakely's red gum grassy woodland, an ecological community classified as critically endangered in NSW.

== Landscape and biota ==
Tarcutta Hills protects the largest area of intact grassy white box woodland in Australia. It has a high species richness and contains habitat suitable for the threatened turquoise parrot, swift parrot, superb parrot and regent honeyeater. The reserve is part of the South-west Slopes of NSW Important Bird Area, identified as such by BirdLife International because of its importance for the conservation of swift parrots and superb parrots. Some of the plants that have a habitat here are white cypress pine, small-leaf bush pea, honeypot, many-flowered mat-rush, kurrajong.
