= Little Billabong, New South Wales =

Little Billabong
- Town
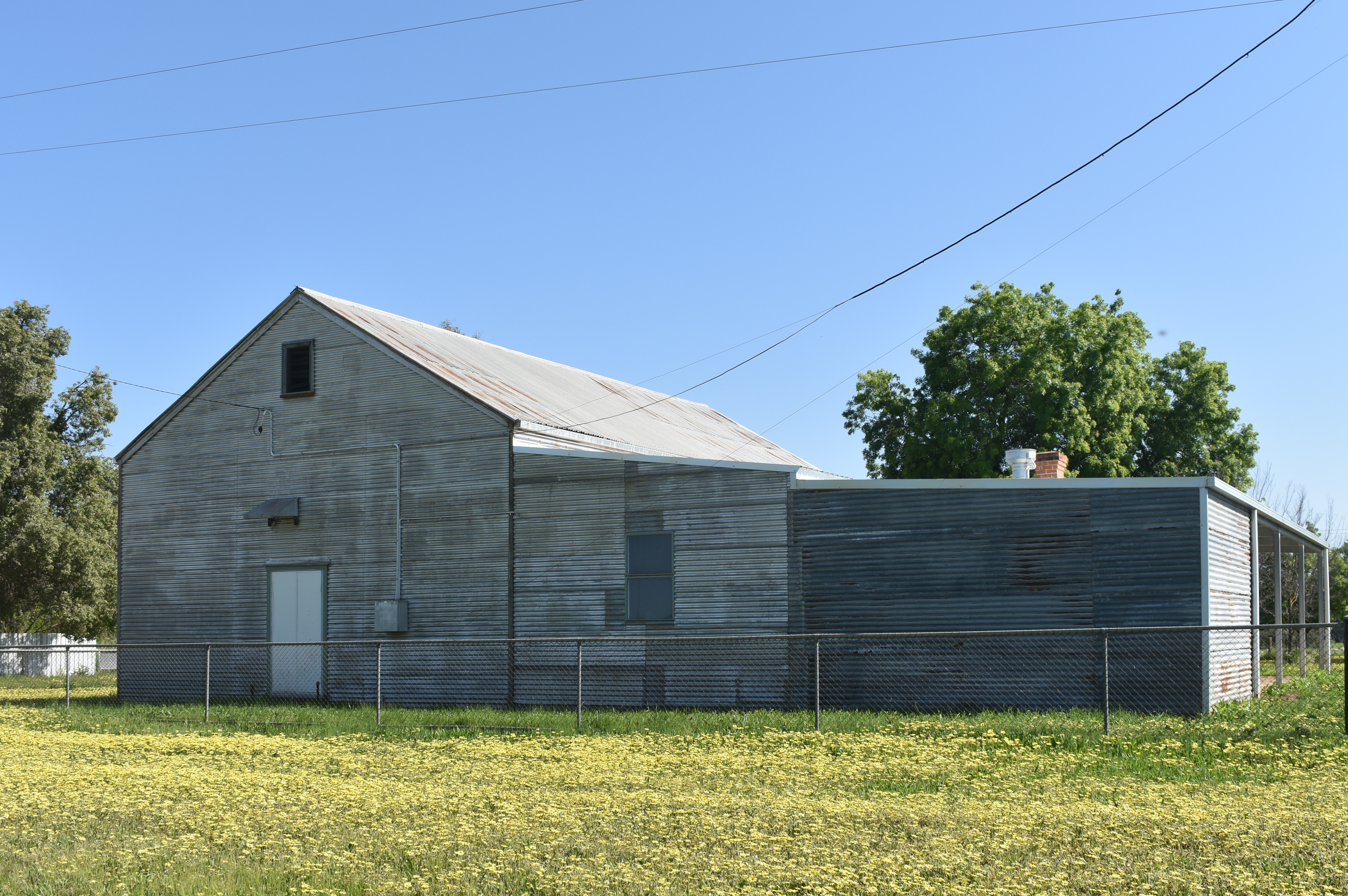
- Little Billabong Community Hall, 2020

- Coordinates: 35°35′S 147°32′E
- Country: Australia
- State: New South Wales
- LGA: Greater Hume Shire Council
- Location: 17 km (11 mi) from Kyeamba; 26 km (16 mi) from Holbrook

Government
  - State electorate: Albury
  - Federal division: Farrer
- Elevation: 303 m (994 ft)

Population
  - Total: 146 (2021 census)
- Postcode: 2644
- County: Goulburn

Little Billabong is a village community in the central part of the Riverina. It is situated by road, about 17 kilometres west of Kyeamba and 26 kilometres east of Holbrook. At the 2021 census, Little Billabong had a population of 146 people.

== History ==
=== Post office ===
Little Billabong Post Office opened on 1 October 1874 and closed in 1953.
