= Burkes Creek =

River in New South Wales, Australia

Burkes Pulletop, Burnetts River
- Location of the Burkes Creek mouth in New South Wales

Location
- Country: Australia
- State: New South Wales
- Region: Riverina (IBRA)
- LGA: Wagga Wagga
- Town: Mangoplah, The Rock

Physical characteristics
- Source: Kyeamba Gap
  - location: near Turkey Springs
  - coordinates: 35°29′18″S 147°30′43″E
  - elevation: 520 m (1,710 ft)
- Mouth: confluence with Bullenbong Creek
  - location: south of Bulgary
  - coordinates: 35°5′48″S 146°58′1″E
  - elevation: 167 m (548 ft)
- Length: 105 km (65 mi)

Basin features
- River system: Murrumbidgee catchment, Murray–Darling basin
- Tributaries
  - left: Majors Creek (Wagga)
  - right: Graveyard Creek, Pinnacle Creek (Wagga)

The Burkes Creek, a mostly–perennial river that is part of the Murrumbidgee catchment within the Murray–Darling basin, is located in the Riverina region of New South Wales, Australia.

== Course and features ==
The Burkes Creek (technically a river) rises near Turkey Springs, below Kyeamba Gap, and flows generally southwest then northwest, joined by three minor tributaries before reaching its confluence with the Bullenbong Creek south of Bulgary. The Bullenbong Creek is a tributary of the Old Man Creek, which itself is a tributary of the Murrumbidgee River. The Burkes Creek descends 352 metres (1,155 ft) over its 105-kilometre (65 mi) course.

The Olympic Highway crosses Burkes Creek at The Rock.

== See also ==
- List of rivers of New South Wales (A–K)
- Rivers of New South Wales
