= Humula =

- Town
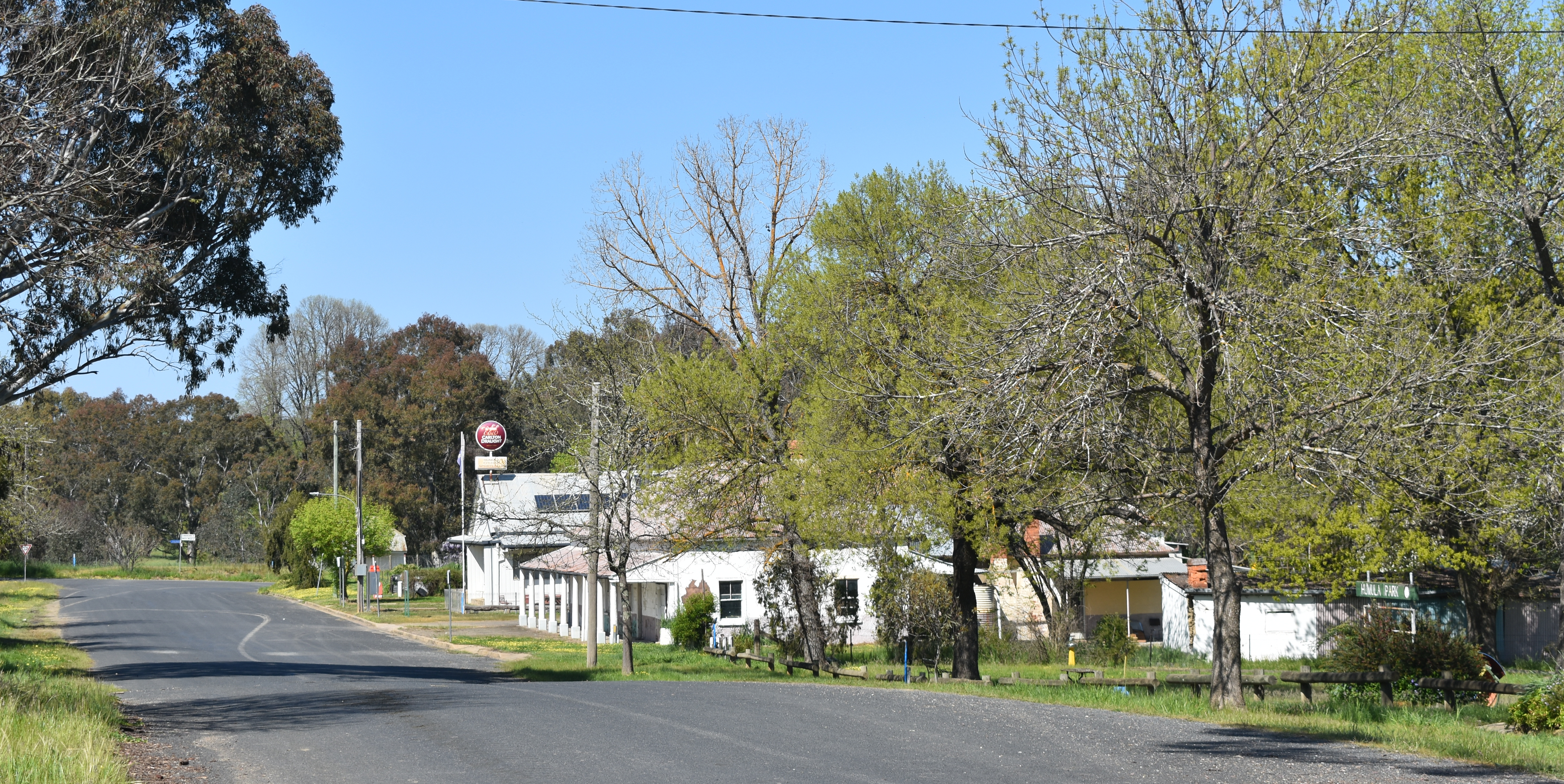
- Mate St, the main street of Humula, 2020

- Coordinates: 35°29′0″S 147°45′0″E
- Country: Australia
- State: New South Wales
- LGA: City of Wagga Wagga
- Location: 14 km (8.7 mi) from Carabost; 16 km (9.9 mi) from Kyeamba

Government
  - State electorate: Wagga Wagga
  - Federal divisions: Riverina; Farrer
- Elevation: 301 m (988 ft)

Population
  - Total: 124 (2016 census Census)
- Postcode: 2652
- County: Wynyard
- Mean max temp: 19.9 °C (67.8 °F)
- Mean min temp: 7.5 °C (45.5 °F)
- Annual rainfall: 891.8 mm (35.11 in)

Humula is a small country town between Tarcutta and Tumbarumba in New South Wales, Australia. Humula was once named "American Yards" or "American Fields" during the gold rush, where many Chinese came for gold years ago. By 1888, the name Humula had been officially adopted by the Post office. At the 2016 census, Humula had a population of 124 people.

Humula is located at the confluence of Carabost Creek, with Umbango Creek, a tributary of Tarcutta Creek, in the Murrumbigee catchment.

Humula Station, which is just outside the town, is one of Australia's most historic farming and grazing properties.

Although Humula is a small town, it has its own fire brigade, public school, p and a recreation ground. After surviving many fires including the latest in February 2006, Humula is still in one piece.

Murraguldrie Post Office opened nearby on 20 March 1874 and was replaced by a Humula office in 1888.

Humula has been around for well over 100 years. Older buildings include the butcher's shop at the end of Mate Street, the Humula Public School on School Street, and the ruins of the old Humula Hotel.

Humula once had a police station at the end of School Street. In the late 1970s and 1980s, Humula's activity and population peaked when logging was the main industry in the area. The Humula sawmill employed many people; when it closed Humula became almost a ghost town. The Sports Club is the only business still operating. Outside the town is Humula's large farming area, most of which has been converted to pine plantations.

Humula had its own railway station and siding, on the Tumbarumba railway line, but the railway is now disused.

The Post Office closed several years ago and the General Store continued in a much smaller role until about 2016.

== Climate ==
Due to being on the boundary between the slopes of the Great Dividing Range and Riverina plain, there is a large seasonal range between maximum temperatures and a pronounced winter rainfall peak.

Climate data for Murraguldrie State Forest 1 (1938–1974); 493 m AMSL; 35.50° S, 147.62° E
Month	Jan	Feb	Mar	Apr	May	Jun	Jul	Aug	Sep	Oct	Nov	Dec	Year
Mean daily maximum °C (°F)	29.7 (85.5)	28.6 (83.5)	25.4 (77.7)	20.4 (68.7)	15.6 (60.1)	11.6 (52.9)	10.5 (50.9)	12.2 (54.0)	15.8 (60.4)	19.3 (66.7)	22.4 (72.3)	26.8 (80.2)	19.9 (67.7)
Mean daily minimum °C (°F)	13.5 (56.3)	14.1 (57.4)	11.5 (52.7)	7.2 (45.0)	4.4 (39.9)	2.6 (36.7)	1.6 (34.9)	2.2 (36.0)	4.2 (39.6)	6.6 (43.9)	9.6 (49.3)	12.0 (53.6)	7.5 (45.4)
Average precipitation mm (inches)	58.0 (2.28)	50.9 (2.00)	61.7 (2.43)	73.9 (2.91)	81.1 (3.19)	81.1 (3.19)	95.0 (3.74)	95.1 (3.74)	71.9 (2.83)	91.0 (3.58)	76.8 (3.02)	55.3 (2.18)	891.8 (35.09)
Average precipitation days (≥ 0.2 mm)	5.5	5.6	5.2	8.2	9.9	10.4	13.6	15.6	11.5	11.0	9.1	6.5	112.1
Source: Australian Bureau of Meteorology; Murraguldrie State Forest 1
