= Alfredtown =

- Town
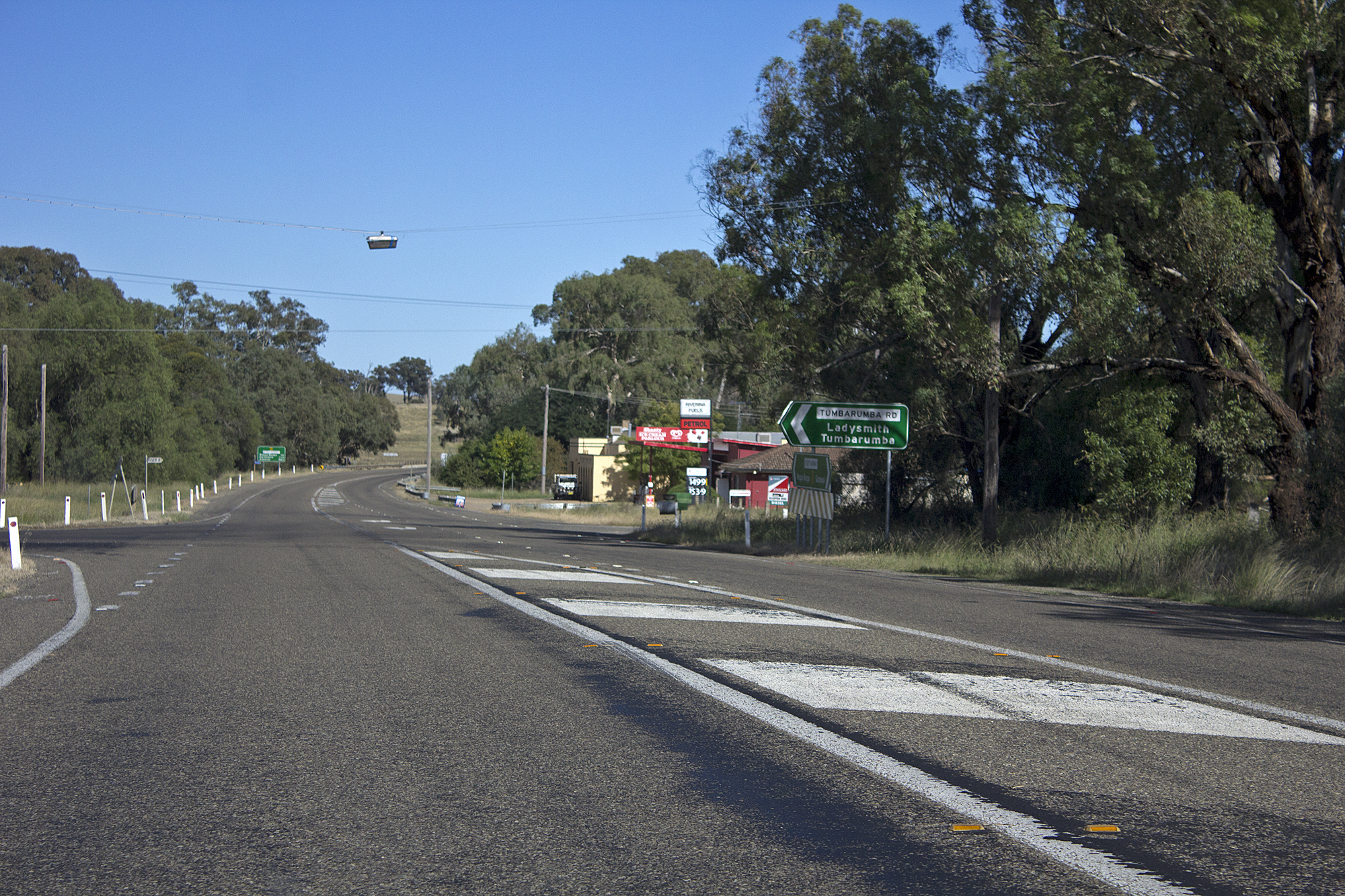
- Sturt Highway in Alfredtown

- Coordinates: 35°10′0″S 147°31′0″E
- Country: Australia
- State: New South Wales
- LGA: City of Wagga Wagga
- Location: 442 km (275 mi) from Sydney; 145 km (90 mi) from Albury; 14 km (8.7 mi) from Wagga Wagga; 5 km (3.1 mi) from Ladysmith

Government
  - State electorate: Wagga Wagga
  - Federal division: Riverina
- Elevation: 195 m (640 ft)

Population
  - Total: 80 (SAL 2021)
- Postcode: 2650
- County: Wynyard
- Parish: Cunningdroo

Alfredtown (known as Alfred Town until 1988, and previously known as The Shanty) is a rural community in the central east part of the Riverina. It is about 5 km north of Ladysmith and 14 km east of Wagga Wagga.

Alfredtown is on the Sturt Highway and consists of The Shanty Hotel (otherwise known as The Shanty Tavern & Bistro) and a petrol station combined with a small store.
