= Tarcutta =

- Town
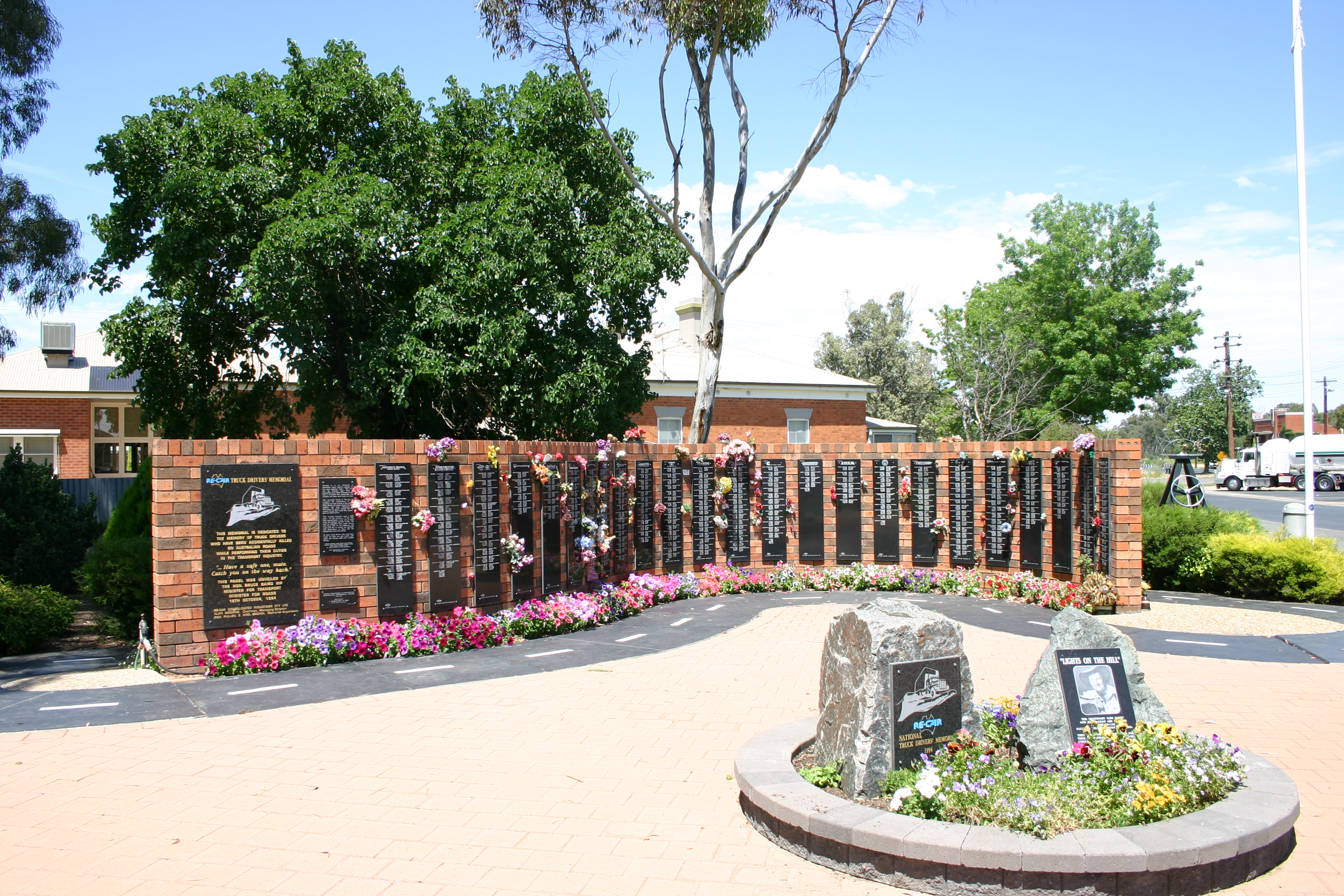
- National Truck Driver Memorial at Tarcutta

- Interactive map of Tarcutta
- Coordinates: 35°16′37″S 147°44′13″E
- Country: Australia
- State: New South Wales
- LGA: City of Wagga Wagga
- Location: 438 km (272 mi) SW of Sydney; 456 km (283 mi) NE of Melbourne; 45 km (28 mi) E of Wagga Wagga; 49 km (30 mi) SW of Gundagai; 132 km (82 mi) NE of Albury

Government
  - State electorate: Wagga Wagga
  - Federal division: Riverina
- Elevation: 233 m (764 ft)

Population
  - Total: 206 (UCL 2021)
- Time zone: UTC+10
  - Summer (DST): UTC+11 (AEDT)
- Postcode: 2652
- County: Wynyard
- Annual rainfall: 663.9 mm (26.14 in)
Localities around Tarcutta
Ladysmith	Mundarlo	Tumblong
	Tarcutta	Adelong
Kyeamba

Tarcutta is a town in south-western New South Wales, Australia. The town is 438 kilometres (272 mi) south-west of Sydney, 3 kilometres (2 mi) east of the Hume Highway, It was proclaimed as a village on 28 October 1890. As of 2016, the town had a population of 446.

It serves a local farming community relying for its prosperity mainly on sheep and cattle, and the interstate truckies who use the town as a halfway change-over point in the trade between the state capital cities of Sydney and Melbourne.

== History ==
The Tarcutta area was first visited by the European explorers Hume and Hovell as they passed through on their way from Sydney to Port Phillip in the Colony of Victoria. On 7 January 1825, near the present site of Tarcutta, they met a group of Wiradjuri aborigines.

A decade after this first European contact around 1835–37, "Hambledon", a U-shaped slab house was built at Tarcutta. It was the first inn and post office to be built between Gundagai and Albury. Tarcutta Post Office opened on 1 January 1849.

Among the earliest settlers was Thomas Hodges Mate. Mate was Tarcutta's earliest innkeeper, as well as its first post-master. Mate's daughter Annie claimed that 'tarcutta' was a Wiradjuri word meaning 'a food prepared by grinding grass seed'.

Gold was mined in the area round Tarcutta, with limited success.

By the 1880s Tarcutta locals were actively lobbying for a rail branch line from Wagga Wagga to Tumbarumba via Tarcutta, and in 1917 the Tumbarumba branch line became a reality. A section of the line sustained major flood damage in 1974, and the remainder of the line was closed in 1987.

The Tarcutta bypass is west of the village, linking-up to the freeway 3 kilometres (1.9 mi) to the north of the village and 3 kilometres (1.9 mi) south of the village. It was opened to traffic on 15 November 2011.

== Trucking industry ==
Tarcutta is situated halfway between Sydney and Melbourne on the Hume Highway, and has long been popular in the trucking industry as a stopping and changeover point for drivers.

The local park houses the National Truck Drivers' Memorial to the truck drivers who have died on the infamous local stretch of the Hume Highway, as well as around the country. The country singer, Slim Dusty, endorsed the memorial with a plaque. A commemorative event is held annually in October.

The local café, which has sustained generations of truckies, has also been the source of inspiration for some of Australia's recent modern poets, Les Murray and Bruce Dawe. Murray wrote "The Burning Truck" while visiting the café in 1961 and Dawe immortalised the eatery in a couple of lines in his poem "Under Way". The poem reads in part: 'there would be days / banging open and shut like the wire door of the cafe in Tarcutta / where the flies sang at the windows'.

There had been extensive political arguing since 1999 between Federal and State Governments over funding and where to site a proposed Tarcutta truck changeover facility. It was finally decided to place it off the main street and the project which was completed early 2007 was jointly funded at a cost of $6.5m. Truck drivers are required to stop for 30 minutes every five hours.

== Heritage listings ==
Tarcutta has a number of heritage-listed sites, including:

- Tarcutta Street: Hambledon Homestead

== Other features ==
Tarcutta is also the birthplace of former Grand Slam champion tennis player Tony Roche. A left-hander, Roche had a successful singles and double career and won 12 Grand Slam men's doubles tournaments.

Located nearby is the 432-hectare (1,070-acre) Tarcutta Hills Reserve, owned and managed by Bush Heritage Australia. This reserve provides an important remnant of white box woodland with a relatively untouched grassy understory: a last refuge for the squirrel glider, endangered birds like the swift parrot, and as many as 11 other threatened wildlife species. The site is listed on the Register of the National Estate.

In 1969, the Tarcutta Rugby League side became the Group 13 Rugby League premiers. Their superior season also saw them crowned as the Clayton Cup winners for 1969.

== Climate ==
Climate data for Tarcutta Post Office (1872–2020)
Month	Jan	Feb	Mar	Apr	May	Jun	Jul	Aug	Sep	Oct	Nov	Dec	Year
Average precipitation mm (inches)	47.8 (1.88)	40.7 (1.60)	47.6 (1.87)	48.4 (1.91)	57.1 (2.25)	68.2 (2.69)	64.2 (2.53)	65.8 (2.59)	56.0 (2.20)	66.0 (2.60)	53.9 (2.12)	47.1 (1.85)	663.9 (26.14)

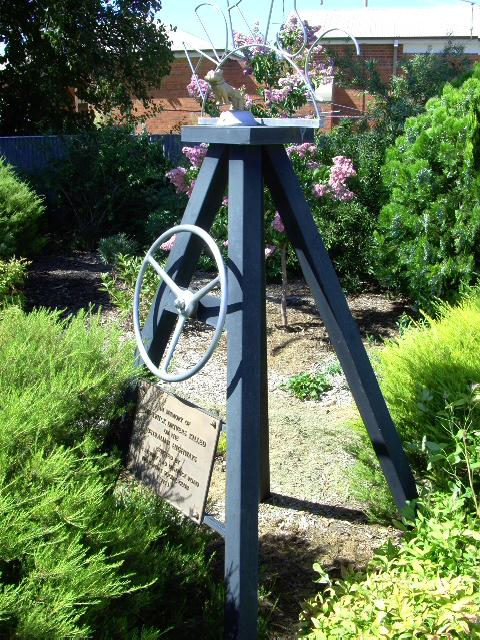
Original truckie memorial at site of current memorial.
