= Tarcutta Creek =

Stream in New South Wales, Australia

Tarcutta
- Location of the Tarcutta Creek mouth in New South Wales
- Etymology: Tarcutta

Location
- Country: Australia
- State: New South Wales

Physical characteristics
- Source: Great Dividing Range
  - location: southwest of Batlow
  - coordinates: 35°08′26″S 147°35′57″E
  - elevation: 620 m (2,030 ft)
- Mouth: confluence with the Murrumbidgee River
  - location: southeast of Oura
  - coordinates: 35°37′4″S 148°38′36″E
  - elevation: 185 m (607 ft)
- Length: 111 km (69 mi)

Basin features
- River system: Murrumbidgee River, Murray Darling Basin

The Tarcutta Creek, part of the Murray Darling basin, is mostly a perennial stream located in the Riverina region of New South Wales, Australia.

== Course and features ==
The stream rises on the western slopes of the Great Dividing Range and Australian Alps, approximately 13 kilometres (8.1 mi) southwest of Batlow. The stream flows generally north by west towards the town of Tarcutta where the creek is crossed by the Hume Motorway. From this point the river continues generally north by west towards the city of Wagga Wagga and reaches its confluence with the Murrumbidgee River, approximately 6 kilometres (3.7 mi) southeast of Oura. The creek descends 435 metres (1,427 ft) over its 111-kilometre (69 mi) course.

== See also ==
- List of rivers of Australia
