= Mundarlo, New South Wales =

Mundarlo New South Wales
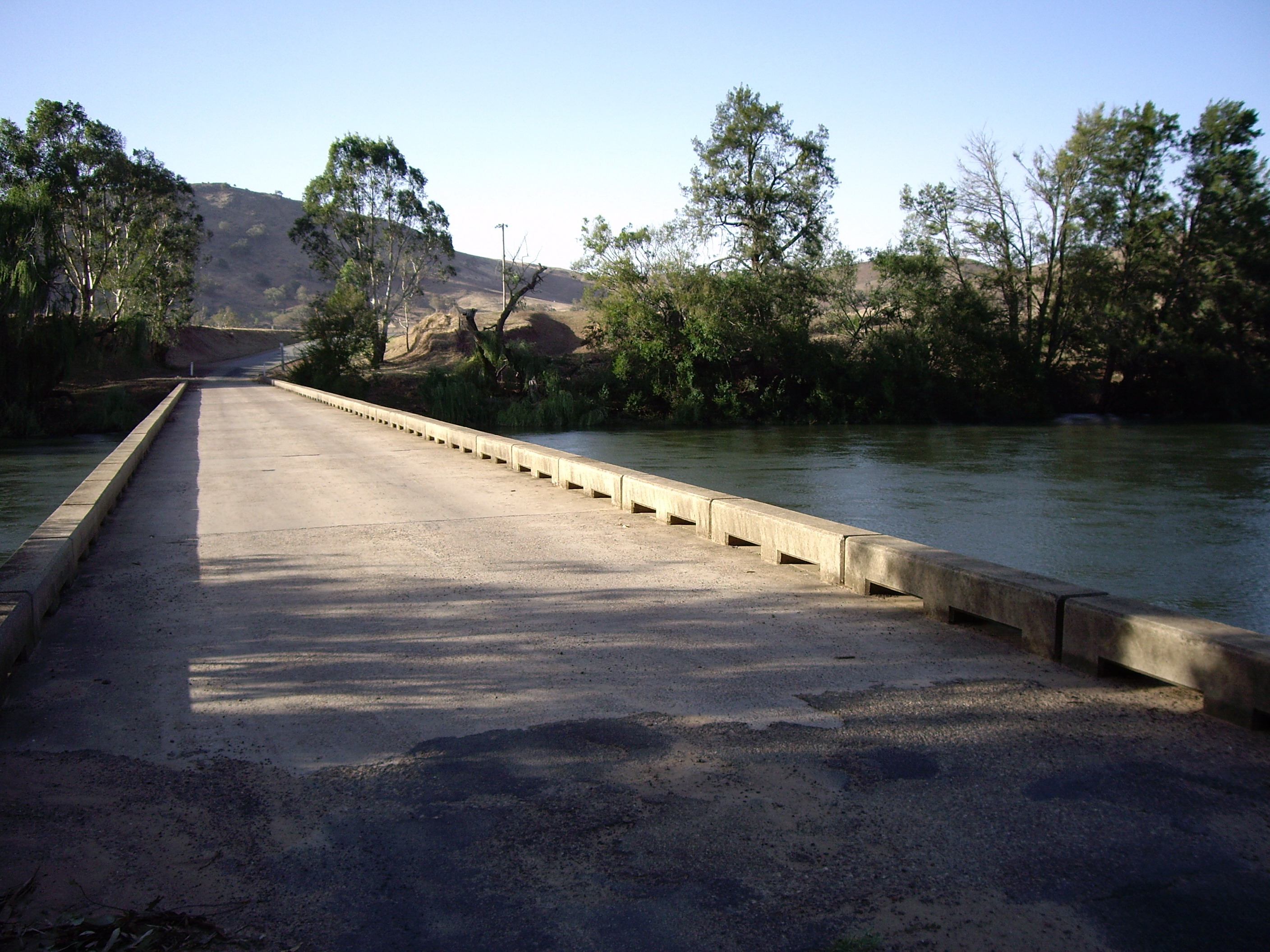
- Mundarlo - Murrumbidgee River crossing

- Coordinates: 35°04′40″S 147°50′39″E
- Population: 51 (2021 census)
- Postcode(s): 2729
- Elevation: 303 m (994 ft)
- Location: 13 km (8 mi) from Wantabadgery; 18 km (11 mi) from Tumblong
- LGA(s): Cootamundra-Gundagai Regional Council
- County: Wynyard
- State electorate(s): Wagga Wagga
- Federal division(s): Riverina

Mundarlo is a farming community in the central east part of the Riverina and situated about 13 kilometres south east from Wantabadgery and 18 kilometres north west from Tumblong. At the 2021 census, Mundarlo had a population of 51 people.

Mundarlo is situated on the southern bank of the Murrumbidgee River and there is a low level concrete bridge river crossing at its location.

Mundarloo (as spelt then) Post Office opened on 1 February 1872 but closed the next year.
