= Wynyard County =

Wynyard New South Wales
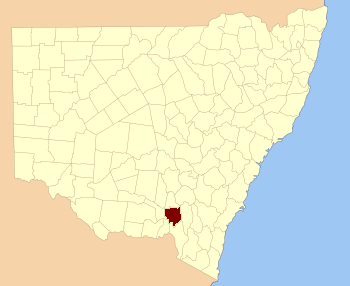
- Location in New South Wales
Lands administrative divisions around Wynyard:
Bourke	Clarendon	Harden
Mitchell	Wynyard	Buccleuch
Goulburn	Selwyn	Selwyn

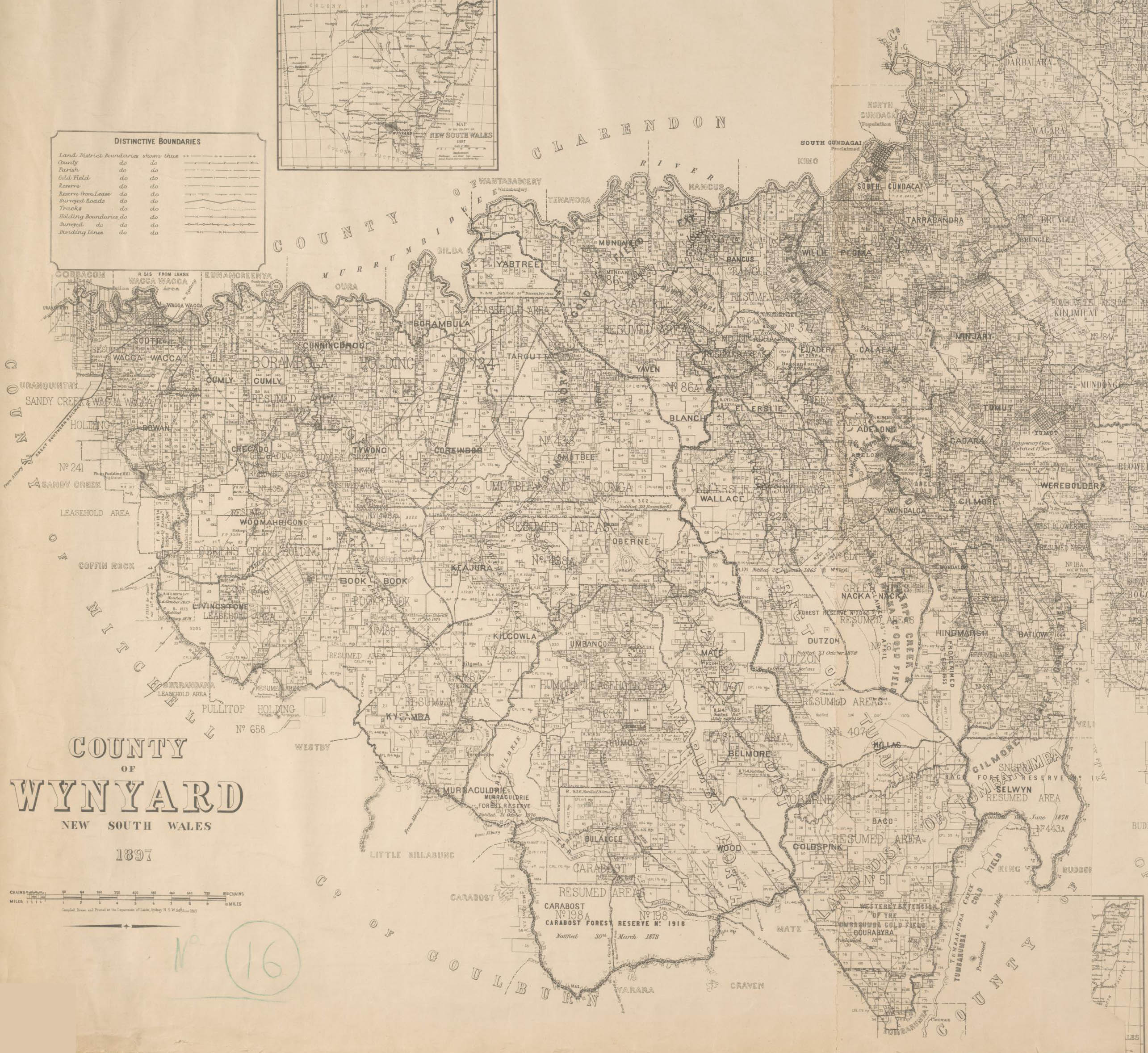
Map of Wynyard county from 1897 showing the parishes

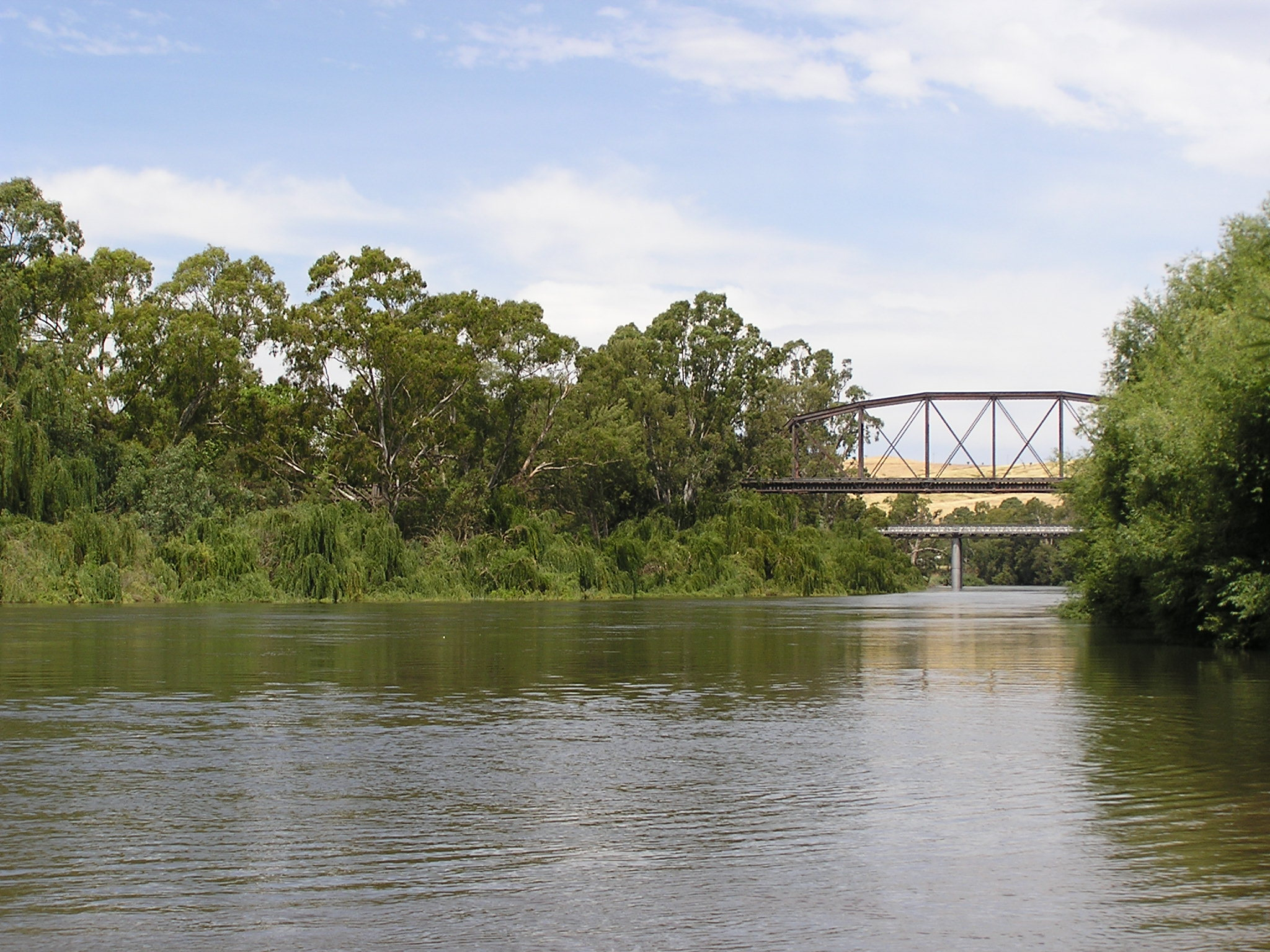
The Murrumbidgee River at Gundagai; the boundary between Wynyard and Clarendon

Wynyard County is one of the 141 cadastral divisions of New South Wales. It contains the city of Wagga Wagga. The Murrumbidgee River lies on the northern edge of the county, and the Tumut River on the eastern edge.

Wynyard County was named in honour of Major-General Robert Henry Wynyard (1802–1864).

== Parishes within this county ==
A full list of parishes found within this county; their current LGA and mapping coordinates to the approximate centre of each location is as follows:

Parish	LGA	Coordinates
Adelong	Snowy Valleys Council	35°18′54″S 148°02′04″E
Bago	Snowy Valleys Council	35°37′54″S 147°59′04″E
Nangus	Cootamundra-Gundagai Regional Council	35°08′54″S 147°58′04″E
Batlow	Snowy Valleys Council	35°27′54″S 148°10′04″E
Belmore	City of Wagga Wagga	35°28′54″S 147°53′04″E
Blanch	City of Wagga Wagga	35°16′54″S 147°51′04″E
Book Book	City of Wagga Wagga	35°21′54″S 147°30′04″E
Borambola	City of Wagga Wagga	35°09′54″S 147°38′04″E
Bulalgee	Greater Hume Shire Council	35°33′54″S 147°42′04″E
Califat	Snowy Valleys Council	35°14′54″S 148°05′04″E
Carabost	Greater Hume Shire Council	35°36′54″S 147°41′04″E
Coreinbob	City of Wagga Wagga	35°14′54″S 147°39′04″E
Courabyra	Snowy Valleys Council	35°39′54″S 148°01′04″E
Cunningdroo	City of Wagga Wagga	35°08′54″S 147°32′04″E
Dutzon	Snowy Valleys Council	35°21′54″S 147°54′04″E
Ellerslie	Snowy Valleys Council	35°14′54″S 147°56′04″E
Euadera	Snowy Valleys Council	35°15′54″S 148°00′04″E
Gadara	Snowy Valleys Council	35°18′54″S 148°07′04″E
Gilmore	Snowy Valleys Council	35°22′54″S 148°09′04″E
Goldspink	Snowy Valleys Council	35°37′54″S 147°55′04″E
Gregadoo	City of Wagga Wagga	35°14′54″S 147°27′04″E
Gumly Gumly	City of Wagga Wagga	35°09′54″S 147°28′04″E
Hillas	Snowy Valleys Council	35°29′54″S 148°00′04″E
Hindmarsh	Snowy Valleys Council	35°27′54″S 148°06′04″E
Humula	City of Wagga Wagga	35°28′54″S 147°46′04″E
Keajura	City of Wagga Wagga	35°19′54″S 147°39′04″E
Kilgowla	City of Wagga Wagga	35°23′54″S 147°38′04″E
Kyeamba	City of Wagga Wagga	35°23′54″S 147°29′04″E
Livingstone	City of Wagga Wagga	35°22′54″S 147°26′04″E
Mate	City of Wagga Wagga	35°26′54″S 147°51′04″E
Minjary	Snowy Valleys Council	35°15′54″S 148°10′04″E
Mundarlo	Cootamundra-Gundagai Regional Council	35°06′54″S 147°51′04″E
Murraguldrie	City of Wagga Wagga	35°27′54″S 147°36′04″E
Nacki Nacki	Snowy Valleys Council	35°21′54″S 147°58′04″E
Oberne	City of Wagga Wagga	35°20′54″S 147°48′04″E
Rowan	City of Wagga Wagga	35°14′54″S 147°22′04″E
Selwyn	Snowy Valleys Council	35°33′54″S 148°09′04″E
South Gundagai	Cootamundra-Gundagai Regional Council	35°03′54″S 148°09′04″E
South Wagga Wagga	City of Wagga Wagga	35°07′54″S 147°21′04″E
Tarcutta	Cootamundra-Gundagai Regional Council	35°10′54″S 147°45′04″E
Tarrabandra	Cootamundra-Gundagai Regional Council	35°08′54″S 148°10′04″E
Tumut	Snowy Valleys Council	35°16′54″S 148°10′04″E
Tywong	City of Wagga Wagga	35°14′54″S 147°33′04″E
Umbango	City of Wagga Wagga	35°26′54″S 147°46′04″E
Umutbee	City of Wagga Wagga	35°14′54″S 147°45′04″E
Wallace	Snowy Valleys Council	35°17′54″S 147°54′04″E
Wereboldera	Snowy Valleys Council	35°22′54″S 148°13′04″E
Willie Ploma	Cootamundra-Gundagai Regional Council	35°08′54″S 148°03′04″E
Wondalga	Snowy Valleys Council	35°23′54″S 148°05′04″E
Wood	Greater Hume Shire Council	35°37′54″S 147°50′04″E
Woomahrigong	City of Wagga Wagga	35°16′54″S 147°25′04″E
Yabtree	City of Wagga Wagga	35°06′54″S 147°45′04″E
Yaven	Cootamundra-Gundagai Regional Council	35°11′54″S 147°51′04″E
