= Kyeamba, New South Wales =

Kyeamba
- Town
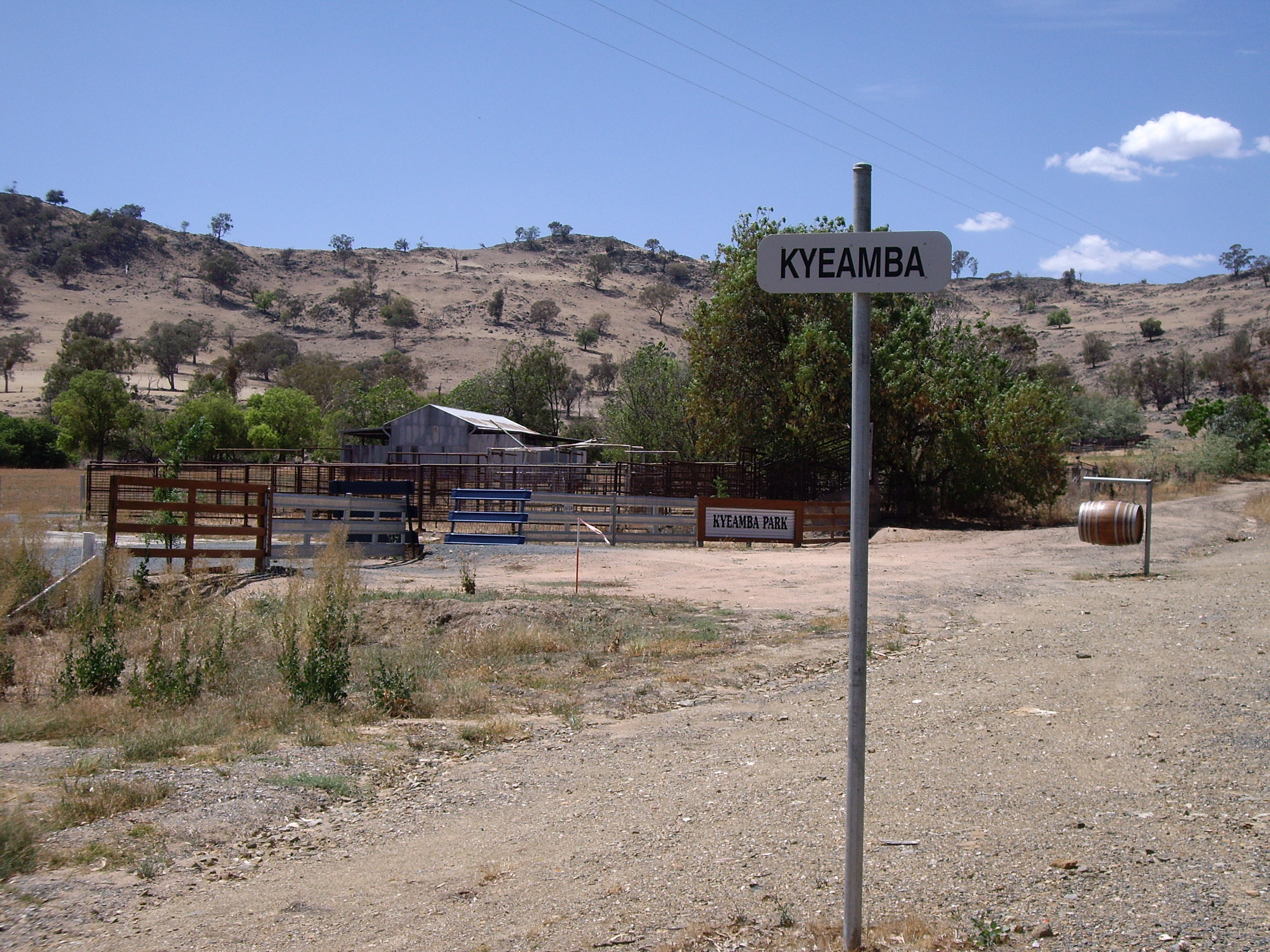
- Entering Kyeamba – the property Kyeamba Park is in the background

- Coordinates: 35°27′31″S 147°36′56″E
- Country: Australia
- State: New South Wales
- Location: 23 km (14 mi) from Tarcutta; 16 km (9.9 mi) from Humula; 28 km (17 mi) from Little Billabong

Government
  - State electorate: Wagga Wagga
  - Federal division: Riverina
- Elevation: 309 m (1,014 ft)

Population
  - Total: 54 (2016 census)
- Postcode: 2650
- County: Wynyard
- Mean max temp: 19.9 °C (67.8 °F)
- Mean min temp: 7.5 °C (45.5 °F)
- Annual rainfall: 891.8 mm (35.11 in)

Kyeamba is a farming community in the central east part of the Riverina and situated about 16 kilometres (9.9 mi) north west of Humula and 23 kilometres (14 mi) south west of Tarcutta. At the 2016 census, Kyeamba had a population of 54.

== Location and features ==
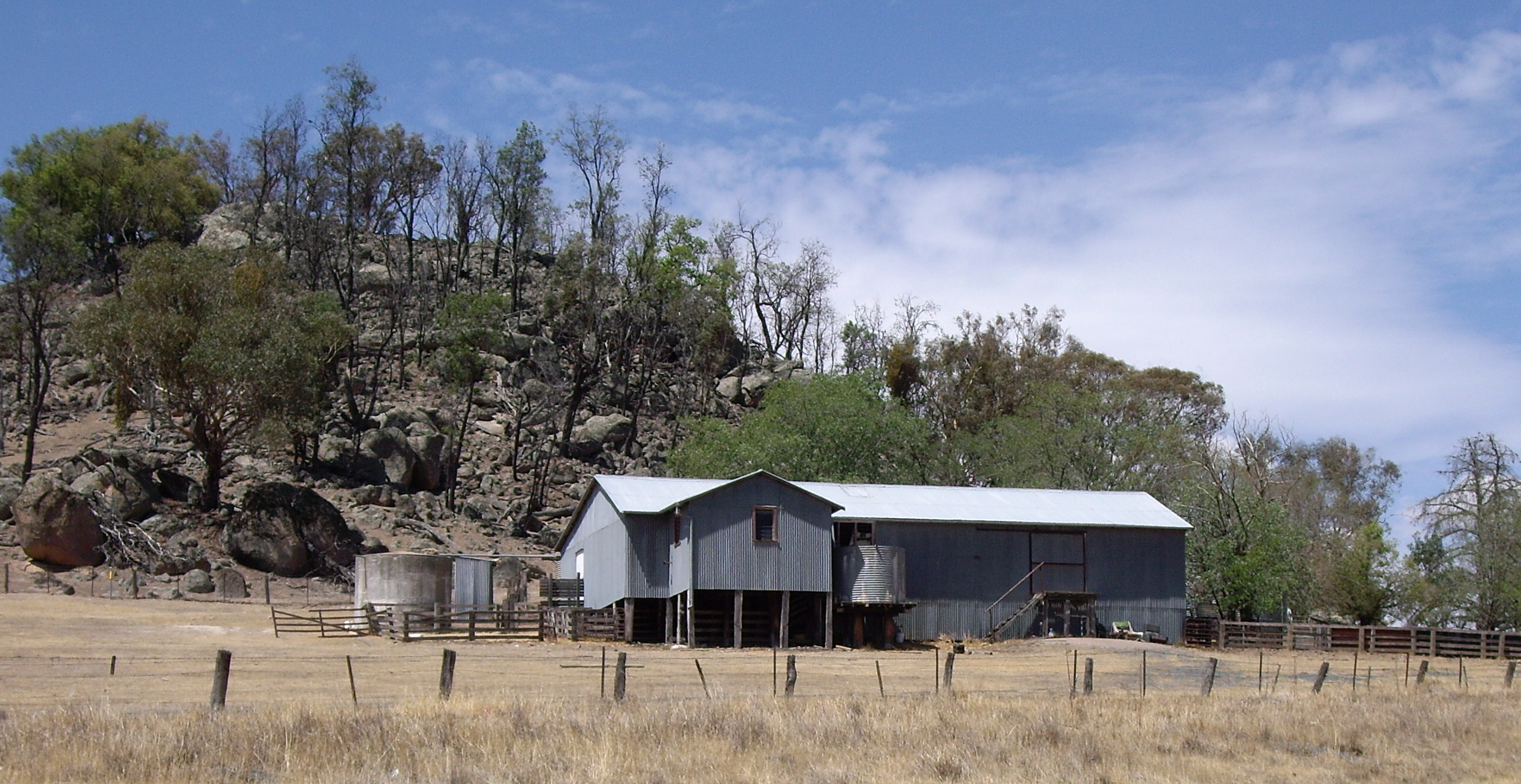
A shearing shed in the area of Kyeamba

The town's name is derived from an aboriginal word for "forehead band".

Kyeamba is situated in the vicinity of the Alfredtown to Kyeamba Road where it meets the Hume Highway. There are no stores or significant public buildings in the area.

Kyamba Telegraph Office opened on 1 September 1861. This later became a post office, was renamed Kyeamba in 1917 and closed in 1957.

== Climate ==
Due to being on the boundary between the slopes of the Great Dividing Range and Riverina plain, there is a large seasonal range between maximum temperatures and a pronounced winter rainfall peak.

Climate data for Murraguldrie State Forest 1 (1938–1974); 493 m AMSL; 35.50° S, 147.62° E
Month	Jan	Feb	Mar	Apr	May	Jun	Jul	Aug	Sep	Oct	Nov	Dec	Year
Mean daily maximum °C (°F)	29.7 (85.5)	28.6 (83.5)	25.4 (77.7)	20.4 (68.7)	15.6 (60.1)	11.6 (52.9)	10.5 (50.9)	12.2 (54.0)	15.8 (60.4)	19.3 (66.7)	22.4 (72.3)	26.8 (80.2)	19.9 (67.7)
Mean daily minimum °C (°F)	13.5 (56.3)	14.1 (57.4)	11.5 (52.7)	7.2 (45.0)	4.4 (39.9)	2.6 (36.7)	1.6 (34.9)	2.2 (36.0)	4.2 (39.6)	6.6 (43.9)	9.6 (49.3)	12.0 (53.6)	7.5 (45.4)
Average precipitation mm (inches)	58.0 (2.28)	50.9 (2.00)	61.7 (2.43)	73.9 (2.91)	81.1 (3.19)	81.1 (3.19)	95.0 (3.74)	95.1 (3.74)	71.9 (2.83)	91.0 (3.58)	76.8 (3.02)	55.3 (2.18)	891.8 (35.09)
Average precipitation days (≥ 0.2 mm)	5.5	5.6	5.2	8.2	9.9	10.4	13.6	15.6	11.5	11.0	9.1	6.5	112.1
Source: Australian Bureau of Meteorology; Murraguldrie State Forest 1

== See also ==
- Burkes Creek
