= Tumbarumba railway line =

Former railway line in New South Wales

Overview
- Owner: Transport Asset Manager of New South Wales
- Termini: Wagga Wagga; Tumbarumba
- Stations: 16

History
- Opened: 1917
- Closed: 1974

Technical
- Track length: 80 miles (129 km)
- Track gauge: 4 ft 8 1/2 in (1,435 mm)

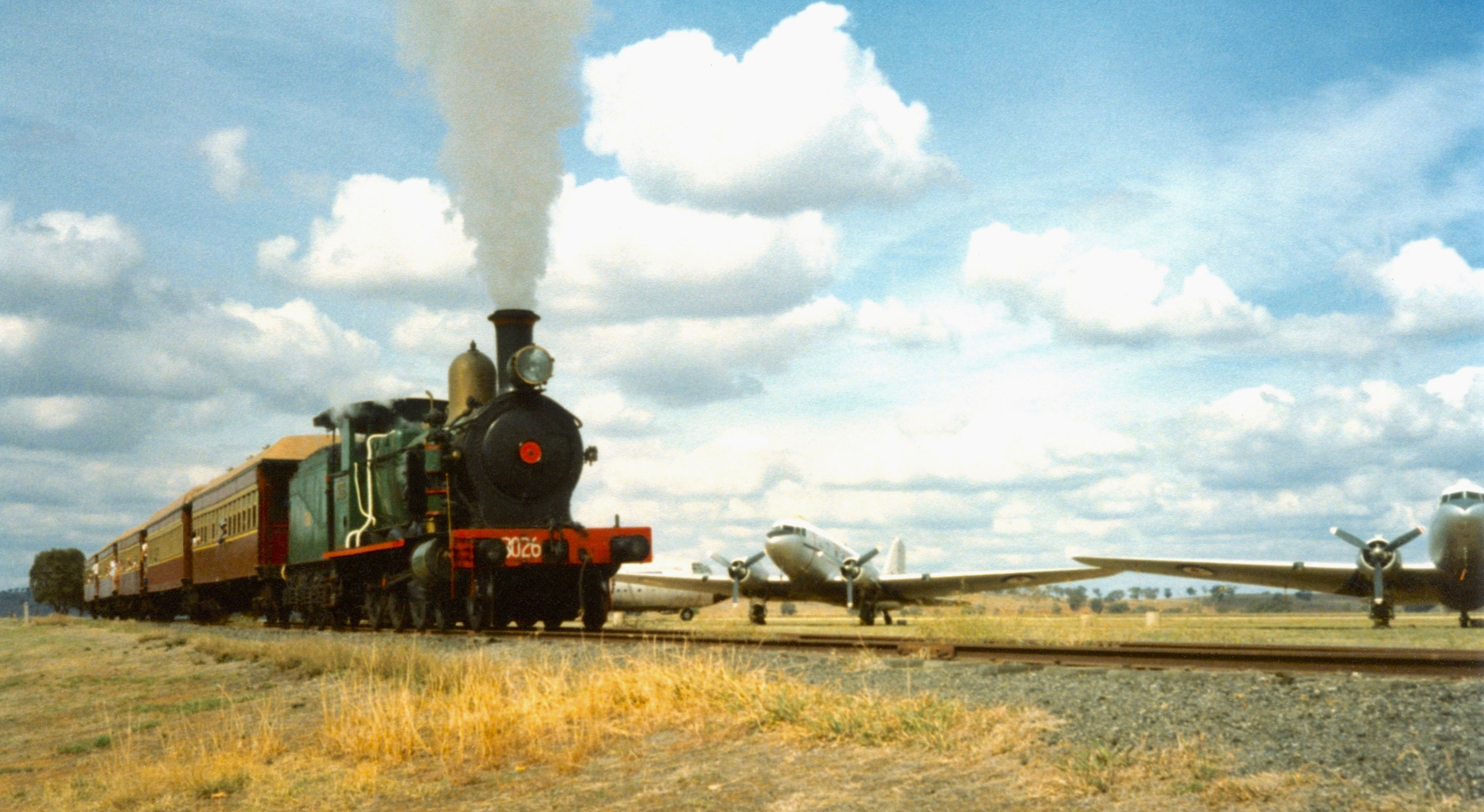
In the final years of the line, the Australian Railway Historical Society ran several special trains to Tumbarumba. This 1983 train was passing by parked aircraft as it returned to Wagga Wagga through the Air Force base at Forest Hill.

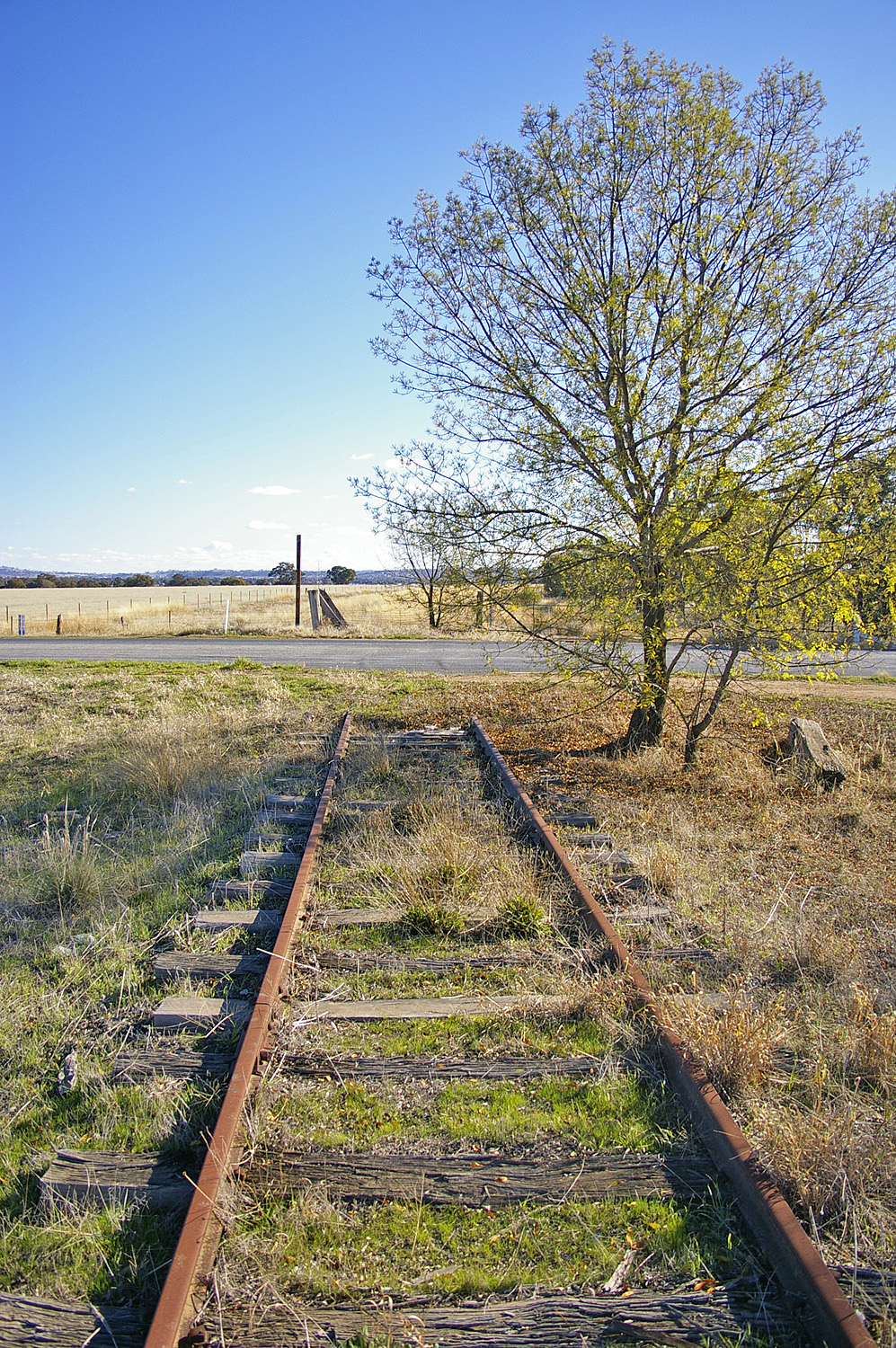
Part of the line, disused, in 2008

The Tumbarumba railway line is a railway line in New South Wales, Australia. Proposals were commenced back as early as 1881. The length of an initial proposal showed it to be 74 miles 64 chains (120.4 km) in length. The final built length being 80 miles (129 km).

Following heavy rains causing numerous wash-aways services were suspended, although the line is not officially closed (which would require an Act of Parliament). Passenger services on the line in the final years comprised CPH railmotors. The line branched from the Main South line at Wagga Wagga and passed through Tarcutta to the township of Tumbarumba. It opened in stages from 1917 to 1921 and was essentially closed in 1987. Passenger trains ceased operation in 1974 after significant flooding saw much of the line abandoned. In 2001, a large grass fire started by a passing Northbound semi-trailer destroyed the disused Tarcutta railway station before it could be restored by a local historical group. All other stations on the line have been demolished with the exception of Ladysmith (which is maintained by the Ladysmith Tourist Railway Inc. historical group) and Borambola. Although several sections of rail have been removed (albeit without the approval of NSW Railways), much of the line still exists. In 2020 the disused 22 km section Tumbarumba–Rosewood was graded, surfaced and sealed by the NSW government and Snowy Valleys Council as a pilot "rail trail" for recreational use by walkers, joggers and cyclists; official opening 3 April 2020.

The Tarcutta fires of early 2013 caused significant damage to the small historic halt platform of Edwards Crossing and the surrounding area of railway.

== See also ==
- Rail transport in New South Wales
- Rail rollingstock in New South Wales
