= History of Wagga Wagga =

Australian city history

The history of Wagga Wagga details the growth of the city from a small crossing on the Murrumbidgee River to the largest city and regional centre of the Riverina region of New South Wales, Australia.

== Indigenous settlement ==
The original Aboriginal inhabitants of the Wagga Wagga region were the Wiradjuri people and the term "Wagga" and derivatives of that word in the Wiradjuri aboriginal language was thought to mean "crow". To create the plural, the Wiradjuri repeat a word, thus 'Wagga Wagga' translated to 'the place of many crows'. Other translations have also attributed the word 'wagga' to meaning, 're-eling (a sick man or a dizzy man); to dance, slide or grind'. Wiradjuri people have maintained a relationship with the Wagga Wagga area to this day.

In August 2019, Wagga Wagga dropped the definition 'crow' and adopted the city's Aboriginal meaning as 'dance and celebrations'. The new meaning was officially enshrined in the city's first Reconciliation Action Plan.

For more history of the Wiradjuri at Wagga Wagga see also; Mary Gilmore and the history of Wagga Wagga.

== European exploration and settlement ==
The first European explorer to pass over the future site of Wagga Wagga was Captain Charles Sturt and his men in 1829 during his expedition along the Murrumbidgee River. Sturt was aided by Wiradjuri guides who handed the explorers to different Aboriginal guides downstream. The first European settler in the Wagga Wagga area was Charles Tompson, an emancipated convict who along with his family established the Eunonyhareenyha 'run' on the north bank of the river in 1832. Soon after another ex-convict George Best established the Wagga Wagga 'run' on the south bank, named for the Aboriginal term for the waterhole on the property where crows congregated. Other settlers followed, all of them squatting on the land illegally. By 1836 the colonial government regulated their tenure and established a licensing scheme.

The continuing encroachment by Europeans on Wiradjuri lands made conflict inevitable. Aboriginal groups attempted to drive off the squatters' stock and attacked shepherds and hutkeepers. The white residents retaliated, at first in relation to specific grievances, later fighting became more general. The ruthlessness of the settlers, combined with the effect of diseases such as tuberculosis, smallpox and influenza eventually defeated the Wiradjuri, who while retaining much of their culture lost their land and lifestyle.

As the number of settlers in the area grew, so did demand for a local bench of magistrates as the nearest ones were 100–200 miles away in Tumut and Binalong. In April 1847 it was announced that Wagga Wagga was to be a place for holding petty sessions, dispensing justice and maintaining law and order over an area up to 100 miles away. The courthouse was located with the beginnings of a village formed near the ford used by most traffic passing through the area. The village included a crude blacksmith's shop and hotel. A post office was established in January 1849 and later that year the town was marked out by surveyor Thomas Townshend and formally gazetted as a village on 23 November 1849.

== A river crossing ==
In September 1859 local residents formed a committee for the construction of a bridge over the Murrumbidgee River. A number of proposals were examined in December 1859 and a pontoon bridge, submitted by Fowler Boyd Price, was in favour. The committee planned to establish a Pontoon Bridge Company with a capital of £4,000 in 200 shares of £20 but the engineering experts from the Roads Branch of the New South Wales Department of Public Works objected to the pontoon bridge. The local committee agree to build a pile bridge which was recommended by New South Wales Department of Public Works. After the New South Wales Government refused to support this type of bridge the committee decided to finance it themselves.

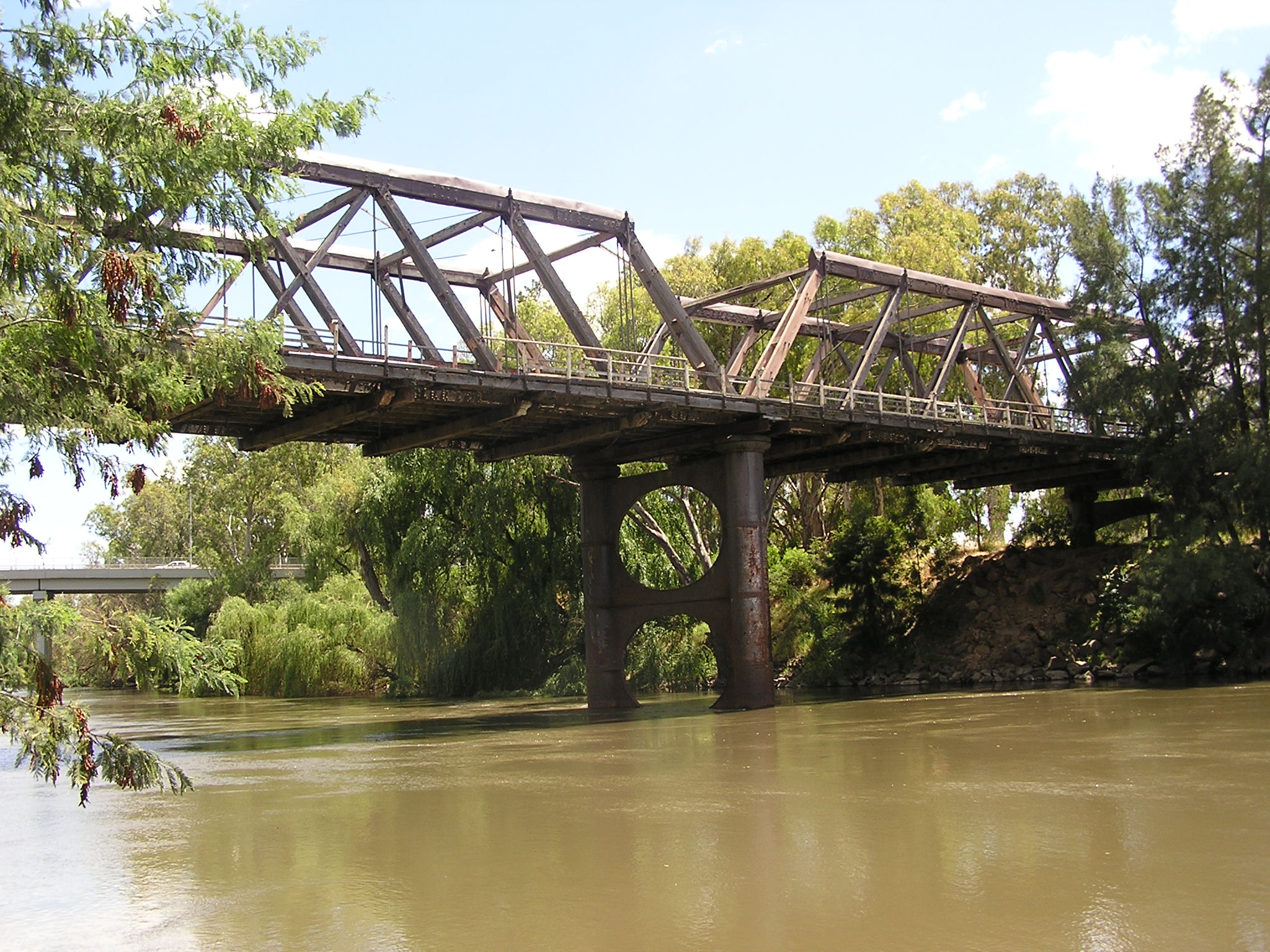
Hampden Bridge

On 23 August 1860 a joint stock company was formed to complete and maintain the bridge between Crampton and Travers Streets as well as to make a proper road to the bridge from existing streets. On 5 December 1861 the New South Wales Parliament enacted a bill to form the Wagga Wagga Company Bridge to build a bridge not less than 25 feet wide and 7 feet in height. The Act gave the Company authority to receive a toll, not exceeding £5 for most persons using the bridge. The company's directors had to raise loans because the shares were not readily purchased as many people feared the bridge would be washed away by floods. The bridge was completed in October 1862 and opened on 27 October at just over 91 metres long and 7 metres wide.

In 1884 the New South Wales Government purchased the bridge for the public for £9,804. Tolls were ceased on 29 February 1884 at noon. In the 1890s use of the bridge increased. Its timbers were decaying and the bridge was in danger of collapse. The local Member of Parliament, James Gormly, appealed to the Department of Public Works to replace the bridge. The Wagga Wagga Company Bridge served the public for 33 years and was demolished in 1895.

In 1895 Hampden Bridge, a truss bridge was built across the Murrumbidgee River at Wagga. On 16 August 2006 Hampden Bridge was closed and fenced off to the public due to the bridge being declared a safety risk after one of the trusses failed. Demolition of the bridge commenced in June 2014 and was completed on 20 August of the same year. There was great discussion involved regarding the decision to demolish the bridge, as people felt it held historical significance.

== Heritage listings ==
Wagga Wagga has a number of heritage-listed sites, including:

- Botanic Gardens Site (BGS), Baden Powell Drive: Mobile Cook's Galley, Museum of the Riverina
- Main Southern railway: Wagga Wagga railway station

== Law and order ==
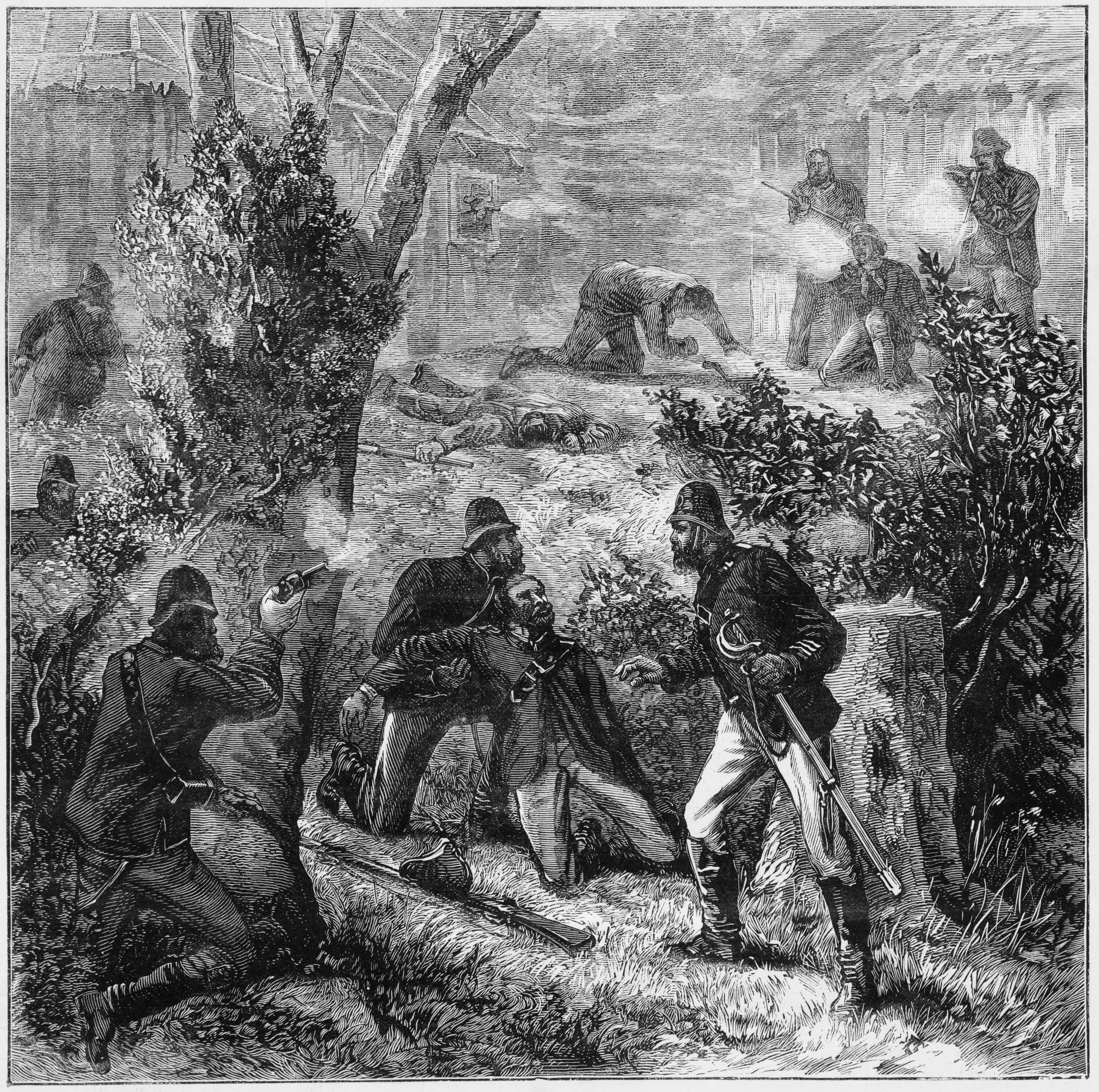
Capture of Captain Moonlite

With increasing prosperity and population Wagga and surrounding district became a place of interest to several infamous bushrangers. Notoriously the Wagga police magistrate Henry Baylis was bailed up by Mad Dog Morgan in 1863. Later when Baylis and some police officers tracked Morgan to where he was camping, the magistrate was shot and wounded.

Captain Moonlite after being released from gaol in 1879 for a robbery committed at Egerton, near Ballarat arrived on 15 November 1879 looking for work at Wantabadgery Station which is situated about 38 km east of Wagga. When work was refused, Moonlite and his band of 5 others returned and held up all 39 people at the station. Later one of the hostages escaped and three mounted police from Wagga arrived to be engaged by the gang in a shoot out. When the police retreated, Moonlite and his gang escaped only to be captured at another nearby property when police from the neighbouring townships of Gundagai and Adelong arrived. Moonlite was later hung for his crimes.

Ned Kelly's younger brother James Kelly, initially following in the footsteps of his elder sibling, and having just completed four years of imprisonment for cattle theft, was sentenced in 1877 at the Wagga courthouse to ten years gaol for stealing two horses from Wagga hoteliers. Unlike his older brother, when released he led a respectable life and lived until 1946.

== Federation and war ==
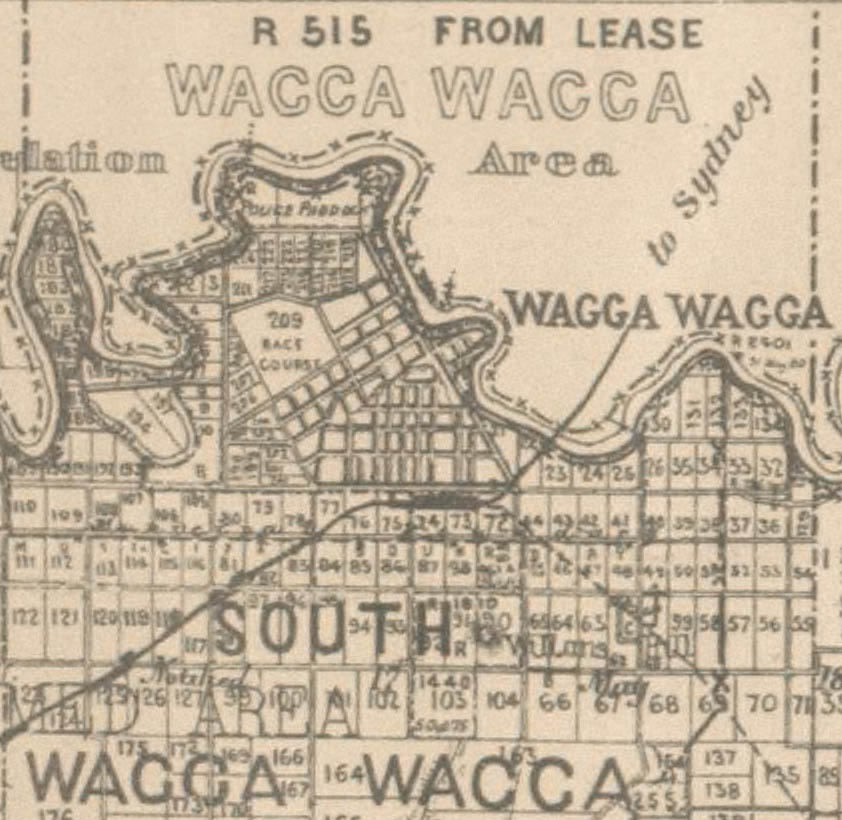
Wagga CBD in 1897

At end of the nineteenth century, Wagga Wagga, like most of rural Australia, was proud of its ties to imperial Britain and volunteers from Wagga Wagga enlisted in military units sent to imperial conflicts such as the Mahdist War in Sudan in 1885 and later in 1899 the Second Boer War in South Africa. Notwithstanding the strength of these ties, demonstrated by the enthusiastic celebrations of Queen Victoria's jubilee in 1897, national sentiment was rising in Wagga Wagga.

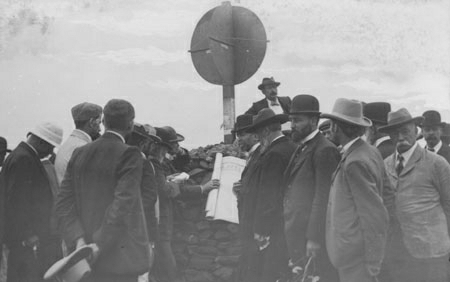
Federal parliamentarians visiting a proposed site for the Federal Capital of Australia in Wagga Wagga

Along with most of the Riverina region, the majority of Wagga Wagga residents supported the federation of the Australian colonies, in large part due to the prospect of free trade across colonial borders. Many addresses by visiting politicians supporting Federation were held in front of large crowds in Wagga Wagga, often from the balconies of various hotels. From 1898, a group of residents promoted Wagga Wagga for consideration as the site of the future national capital due to its location equidistant from Sydney and Melbourne and its ample water supply. Despite the bid's lack of success, in the 1899 referendum Wagga Wagga residents voted strongly in favour of federation.

The start of World War I once again led to many men from Wagga Wagga and the surrounding area volunteering to serve King and country. The town was the starting point of the "Kangaroo March", one of a series of snowball marches conducted in New South Wales during the war where groups of recruits would march toward Sydney and appeal to men in the towns along the route to join them and enlist in the Australian Imperial Force. 88 recruits left Wagga Wagga on 1 December 1915, farewelled by a large crowd and to the accompaniment of a band. The marchers included John Ryan, who later won the Victoria Cross for his actions in the Battle of the Hindenburg Line in 1918. Along the way, the march stopped in towns such as Junee, Cootamundra, Murrumburrah and Yass and finished at Campbelltown with over 220 recruits. The local Rugby league football team, Wagga Kangaroos, chose its name in commemoration of the march. The two bitter conscription referendum debates in 1916 and 1917 exposed deep divisions in Wagga Wagga society with the respectable and mostly Protestant farmers, graziers, businessmen, and professionals generally in favour of conscription while the anti-conscriptionist tended to be Catholic and working class. Both referendums were narrowly defeated nationally, with Wagga Wagga voting for conscription in 1916 and against in 1917.

== Between the wars ==
The soldiers returning from the war in Europe brought with them the "Spanish flu" epidemic that was sweeping the world, for a while bringing the town to a standstill. Some of the area around Wagga Wagga was designated for settlement by returned soldiers, who faced insurmountable difficulties due to poor and unwatered land, lack of farming experience and lack of access to markets. Many walked off the land after years of backbreaking work. After some controversy, the Victory Memorial Gardens were established in 1927 by Wollundry Lagoon to honour those who served.

Throughout the 1920s the NSW State Government improved both the road and rail links in the region. Wagga Wagga was part of a new telephone link between Melbourne and Sydney and a new Post and Telegraph office was constructed to house the repeating centre, one of the largest in regional Australia. Residential growth continued with a population in 1921 of 11,631. Much of this residential growth was housed in the higher ground to the south, extending to the south of the railway tracks. A suburb consisting of tents and crude huts, known as "Tent Town", developed along the river providing housing for the poorer residents of Wagga Wagga. In 1922, electricity was provided for the town, with hydro-electric power available from Burrinjuck Dam from 1928.

The Great Depression had a marked effect on the economic, social and political life of Wagga Wagga. A range of unemployment relief schemes operated in the town, mainly improving public works, however poverty was widespread and "Tent Town" quickly became overcrowded as tenants were unable to afford rental accommodation. The depression, and the election of Jack Lang of the Labor as New South Wales premier, sparked the formation of the "Riverina Movement". Throughout the Riverina in early 1931, a series of rallies were organised by the movement, culminating in a great meeting in Wagga Wagga on 28 February 1931. The meeting called on the State and Federal governments to alleviate the concerns of producers in the district or hold a referendum to determine if the Riverina should secede. The movement petered out following the dismissal of Lang in 1932 and the recovery of the regional economy

== World War II and beyond ==
The outbreak of World War II saw Wagga Wagga become a key centre in the defence of Australia. Royal Australian Air Force bases were established at Forest Hill in 1940 and Uranquinty in 1941. A major Australian Army camp was constructed at Kapooka in 1942 and one year later there were 8,000 troops in training there with Wagga taking on the characteristics of a garrison town. A native of Wagga Wagga, Sir Thomas Blamey, became Australia's highest-ranking officer during the war. Also born in Wagga Wagga was John Hurst Edmondson, a corporal in the 2/17 Infantry Battalion of the 9th Division, the first Australian winner of the Victoria Cross in World War II, for actions at the Siege of Tobruk.

On 17 April 1946, Wagga Wagga was proclaimed a city and Wagga Wagga grew steadily after the war. Suburbs such as Turvey Park, Mount Austin and Kooringal were developed including over 1,200 Housing Commission homes. In the 1960s, residential growth expanded to cover areas such as Tolland and Lake Albert. As the suburban sprawl moved south, the main commercial district also moved south to the Baylis Street end, including developments such as the Sturt Mall, built in 1979 while the northern end of the central business district slowly became deserted. To promote the development of additional secondary sector industries in Wagga Wagga, the City Council developed a series of industrial areas including areas for service and general industries, and agricultural processing and noxious industries were established in a new industrial estate in Bomen.

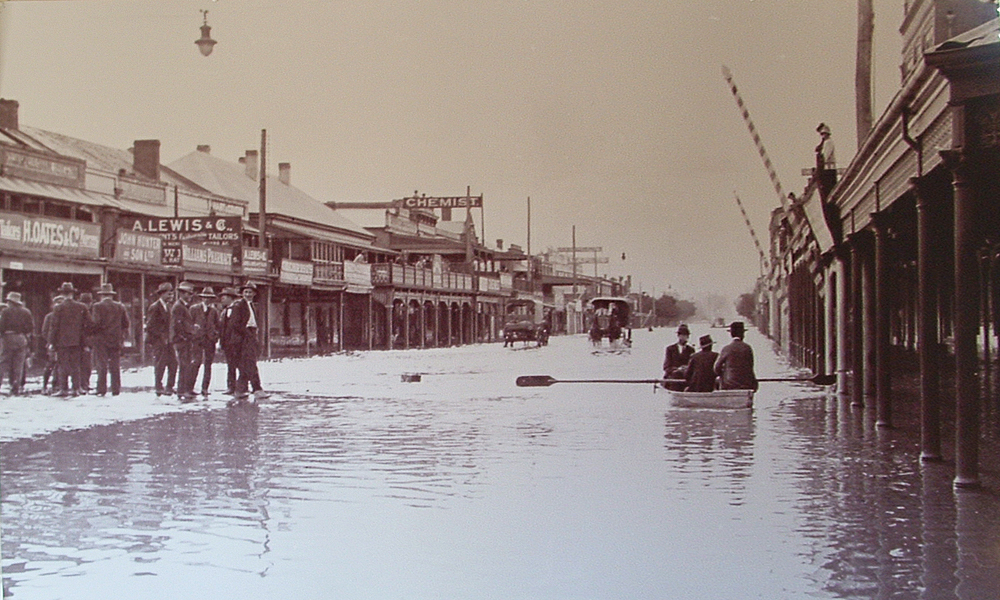
Looking south down Fitzmaurice Street in the May 1925 flood

In the 1950s the defence bases in Wagga Wagga again became an important part of the city. The Army camp at Kapooka was reopened as a recruit training centre from 1951, a role it maintains to this day. RAAF Base Wagga at Forest Hill also expanded, with training of defence force aircraft technicians located there from 1969. A teachers' college was established in Turvey Park in 1947 and an agricultural college in 1949. In 1971, following pressure from the Wagga Wagga community for a university, the teachers' college became the Riverina College of Advanced Education and was relocated to a site adjacent to the Wagga Agricultural College, with whom it amalgamated in 1975. In 1989, the college amalgamated with the College of Advanced Education at Bathurst to become Charles Sturt University. The Wagga Wagga Base Hospital became the major referral hospital in southern New South Wales and in 1963 a new seven-story hospital was constructed.

Flooding remained a common problem for Wagga Wagga, with major flooding occurring in 1844, 1852, 1853, 1870, 1891, 1900, 1925, 1931, 1950, 1952 and 1956. After the 1956 floods, the City Council protected the city area on the south flood plain through construction of a levee. The levee was completed by 1962 and provided protection from 1 in 100-year floods. North Wagga Wagga was excluded from protection, and attempts were made to force residents of North Wagga Wagga to abandon their homes through rigid enforcement of planning controls. North Wagga Wagga residents resisted the attempts to remove them and a sign mysteriously appeared beneath the North Wagga Wagga welcome sign with the wording – We Shall Not Be Moved. By the 1970s, the Council eventually acceded to residents' demands, removing planning constraints and a levee was constructed to protect the village, although at a lower standard, by 1982. In 1981, the New South Wales government forced the amalgamation of Wagga Wagga City Council with neighbouring Kyeamba Shire and Mitchell Shire to form the new City of Wagga Wagga local government area, containing 4,886 square kilometres.

== See also ==
- History of New South Wales
