= Charles Sturt University, New South Wales =

Coordinates: 35°03′28″S 147°21′16″E

Charles Sturt University Wagga Wagga, New South Wales
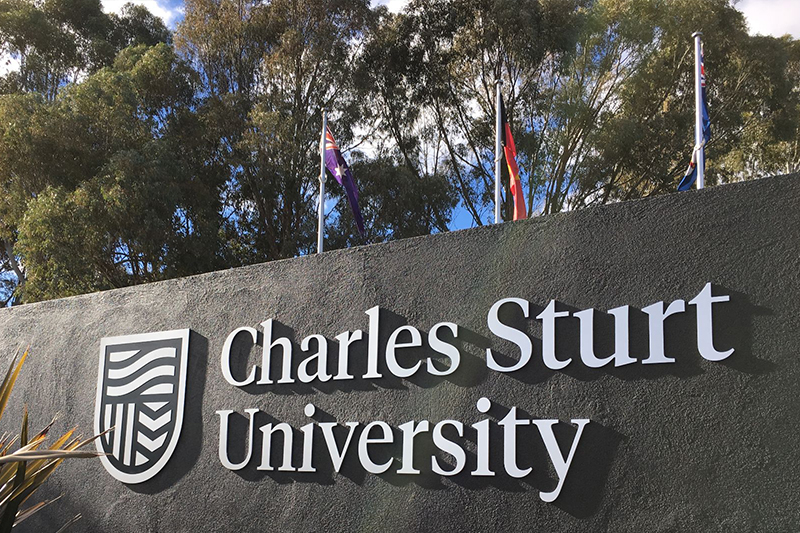
- Charles Sturt University entrance
- Population: 340 (2016 census)
- Postcode(s): 2678
- LGA(s): City of Wagga Wagga
- County: Clarendon
- Parish: Gobbagombalin
- State electorate(s): Wagga Wagga
- Federal division(s): Riverina
Suburbs around Charles Sturt University:
The Gap	Downside	Brucedale
Gobbagombalin	Charles Sturt University	Cartwrights Hill
	Estella	Boorooma

Charles Sturt University is a suburb and location for Charles Sturt University's Wagga Wagga Campus and is located in the suburb of Estella.
