= Harefield (disambiguation) =

Harefield is a suburb of London.

Harefield may also refer to:

- Harefield Entertainment, a 1602 court festival near London
- Harefield, Southampton, a suburb in England
- Harefield, New South Wales, a locality in Australia
  - Harefield railway station, a closed station
