= Gumly Gumly, New South Wales =

Gumly Gumly Wagga Wagga, New South Wales
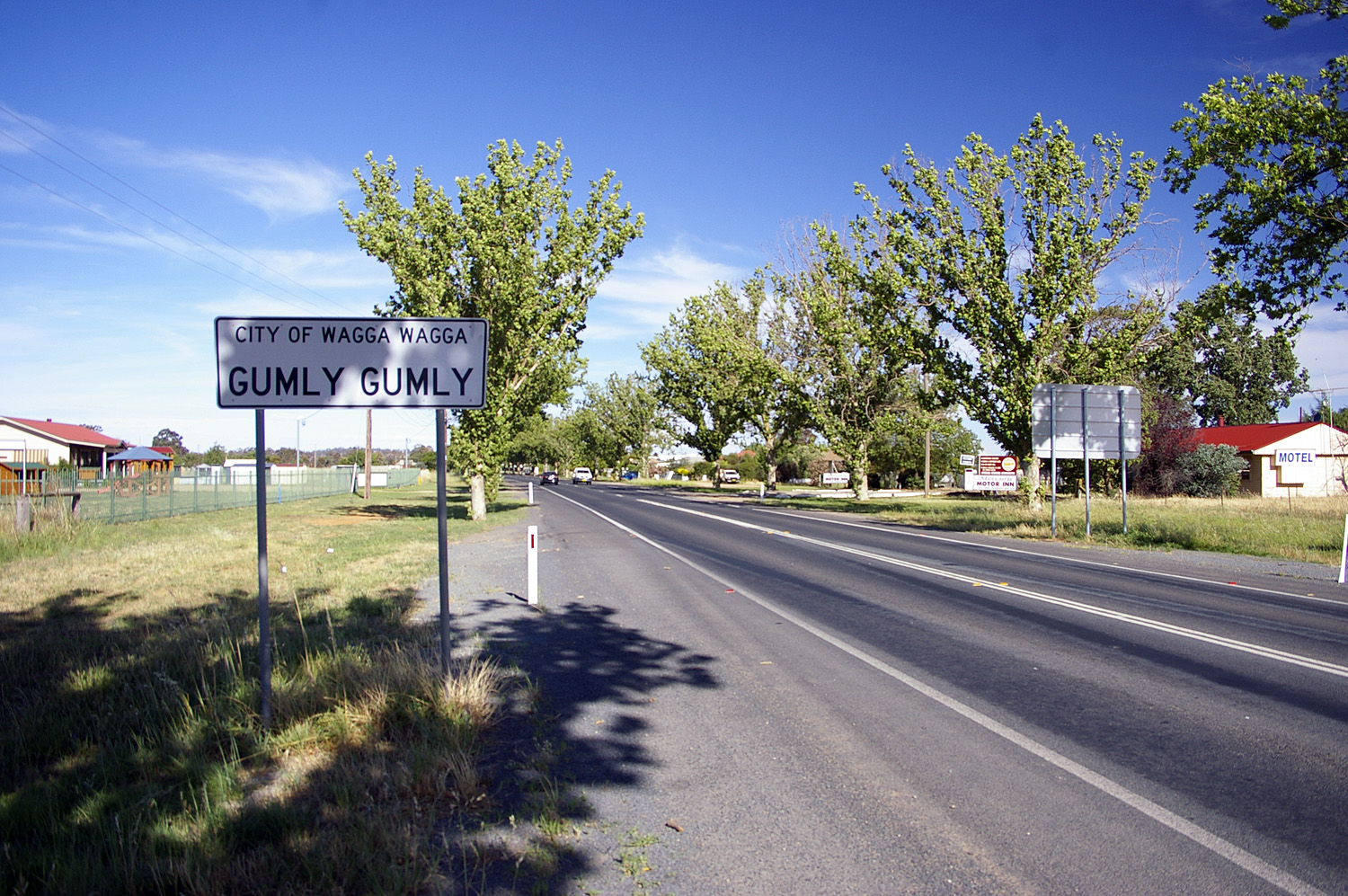
- Gumly Gumly sign

- Coordinates: 35°7′36.12″S 147°25′41.20″E
- Population: 312 (2016 census)
- Established: 1934
- Postcode(s): 2652
- Elevation: 120 m (394 ft)
- LGA(s): City of Wagga Wagga
- County: Wynyard & Clarendon
- Parish: Gumly Gumly
- State electorate(s): Wagga Wagga
- Federal division(s): Riverina
Suburbs around Gumly Gumly:
North Wagga Wagga	Bomen	Eunanoreenya
East Wagga Wagga	Gumly Gumly	Forest Hill
Kooringal	Gregadoo	Forest Hill

Gumly Gumly is a suburb of the city of Wagga Wagga, New South Wales, Australia and is located approximately 8 km east of the CBD on the Sturt Highway.

== See also ==
- List of reduplicated Australian place names
