= Eunanoreenya, New South Wales =

Eunanoreenya Wagga Wagga, New South Wales
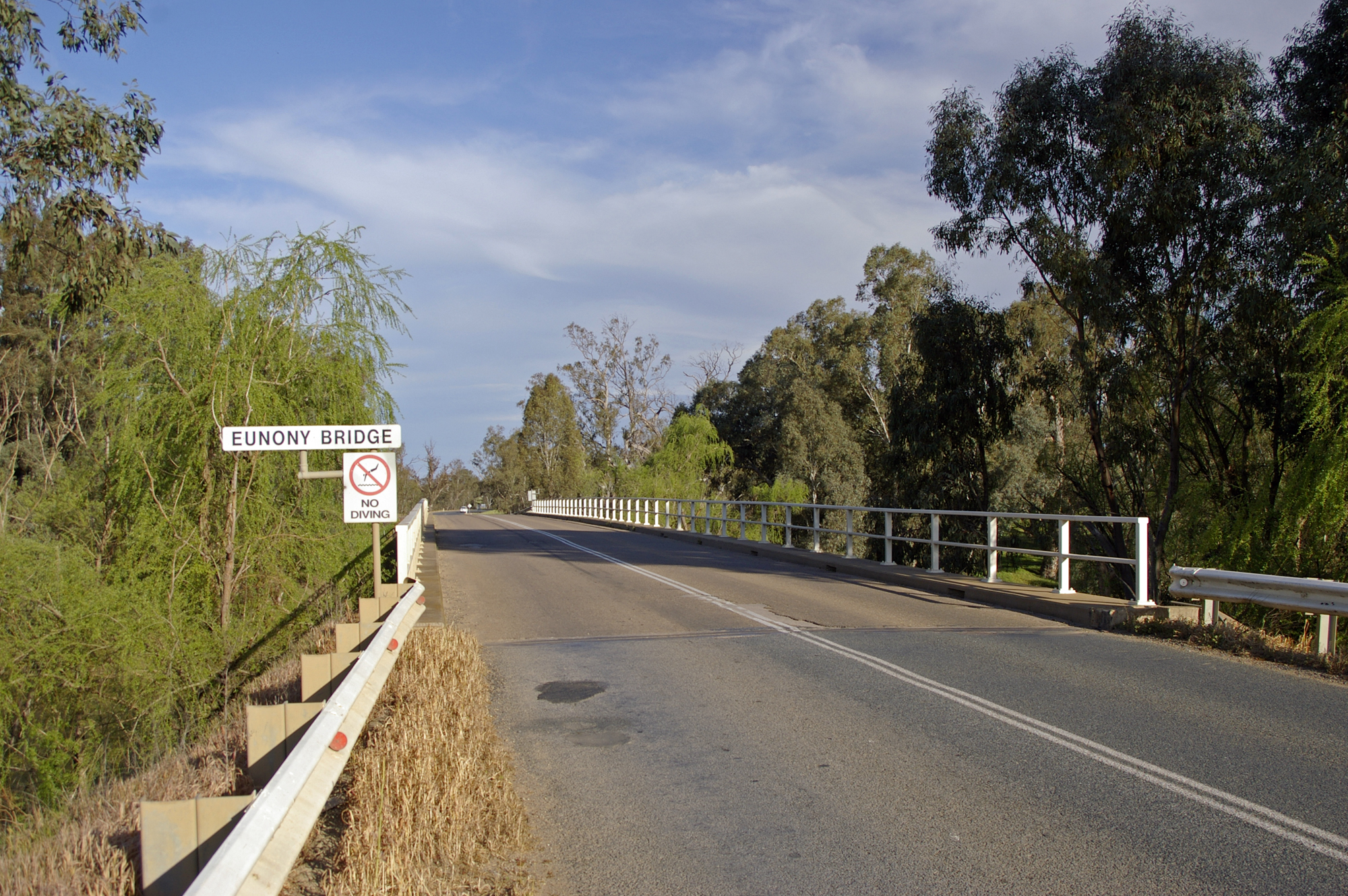
- Eunony Bridge viewed from Eunanoreenya looking towards Gumly Gumly.

- Coordinates: 35°03′54″S 147°28′04″E
- Population: 169 (2016 census)
- Postcode(s): 2650
- LGA(s): City of Wagga Wagga
- County: Clarendon
- Parish: Eunanoreenya
- State electorate(s): Wagga Wagga
- Federal division(s): Riverina
Suburbs around Eunanoreenya:
Bomen	Harefield	Harefield
North Wagga Wagga	Eunanoreenya	Oura
Gumly Gumly	Forest Hill	Alfredtown

Eunanoreenya (previously known as Eunanyhareenyha and Eunonyhareenya) is a rural suburb of Wagga Wagga, New South Wales.
