= Harefield railway station =

Railway station in New South Wales, Australia

Harefield

General information
- Location: Byrnes Road, Harefield, New South Wales; Australia
- Coordinates: 34°57′46″S 147°31′06″E
- Elevation: 254 metres (833 ft)
- Operator: State Rail Authority
- Line: Main Southern line
- Distance: 497.610 km (309.201 mi) from Central
- Platforms: 1 (1 side)
- Tracks: 3

Construction
- Structure type: Ground

History
- Opened: 3 September 1878
- Closed: c.1983
- Former names: Wallace Town (1878–1882)

Services
Preceding station	Former services	Following station
Shepherds towards Albury	Main Southern Line	Junee towards Sydney
Location

Harefield railway station was a railway station on the Main Southern line, serving the locality of Harefield in the Riverina, New South Wales, Australia. The station opened in 1878, when the railway line was extended from its previous terminus at Junee railway station to Bomen railway station.

== History ==
The station opened on 3 September 1878 as Wallace Town, but was renamed Harefield on 1 March 1882 shortly after the renaming of the local post office. Harefield served passengers until c.1983 when it was closed, with the station building remaining in a state of considerable disrepair.

In 2012, the site of Harefield station became a freight container terminal housing up to 160 12-metre containers at any one time.

== Description ==
Harefield consisted of one passenger side platform with a small station building and metal fencing. The station was constructed on a passing loop, with a third track serving a loading bank and refuge siding for grain silos located nearby.
