= Estella, New South Wales =

Coordinates: 35°04′05″S 147°21′15″E

Estella
- Suburb
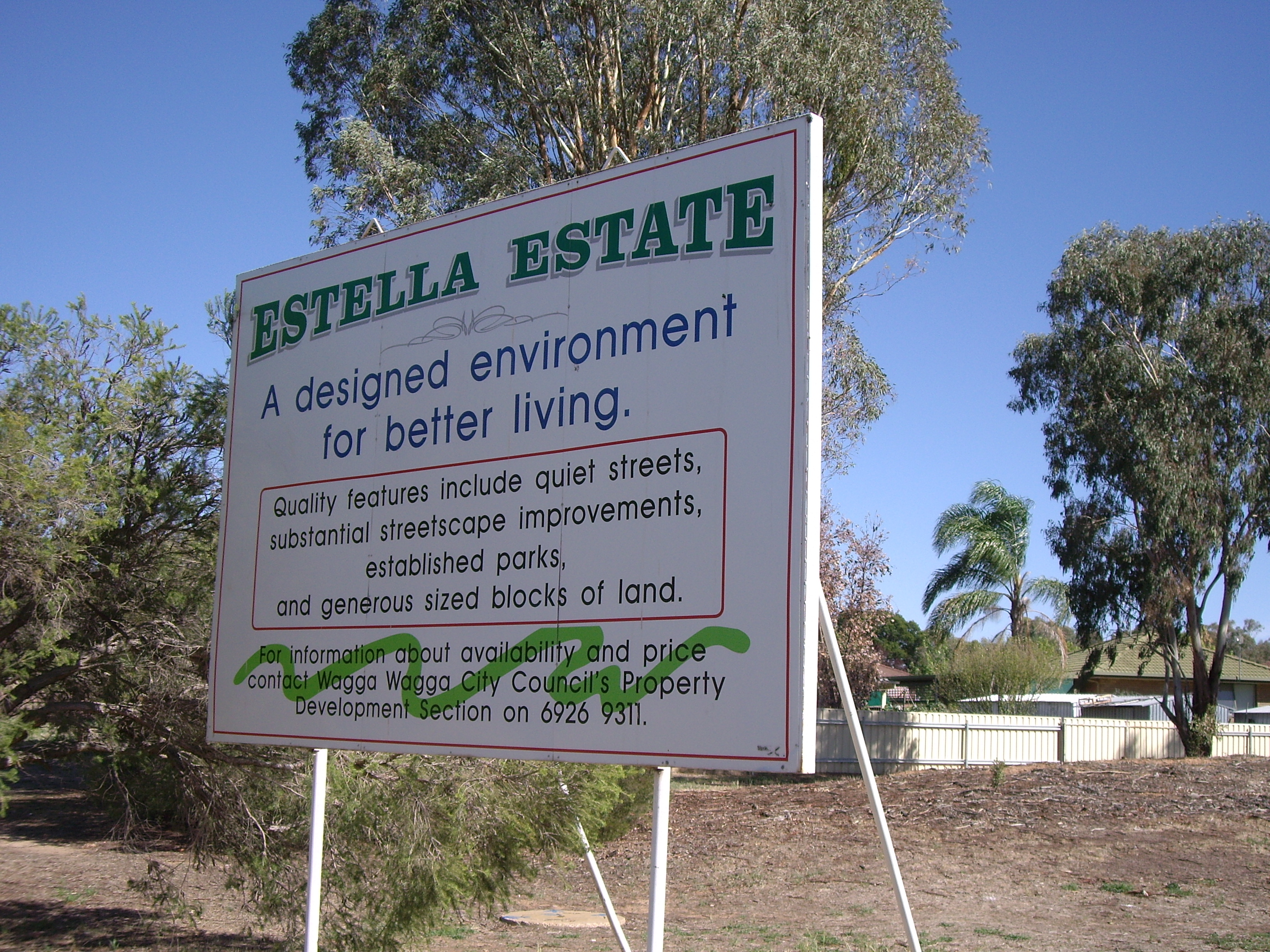
- Entering Estella
- Interactive map of Estella
- Country: Australia
- State: New South Wales
- City: Wagga Wagga
- LGA: City of Wagga Wagga
- Established: 1980s

Government
  - State electorate: Wagga Wagga
  - Federal division: Riverina

Population
  - Total: 2,269 (2016 census)
- Postcode: 2650
- County: Clarendon
- Parish: North Wagga Wagga
Suburbs around Estella
The Gap	Charles Sturt University	Brucedale
Gobbagombalin	Estella	Cartwrights Hill
	Wagga Wagga	Boorooma

Estella is a northern suburb of Wagga Wagga, New South Wales, Australia. The suburb is relatively new with development commencing in the 1980s, however growth has been slow and land is still being subdivided.

The suburb is located directly to the south of Charles Sturt University, and to the west of Boorooma. The southern and western boundaries of the suburb are Old Narrandera Road and Pine Gully Road respectively.

Streets in Estella are named after crop varieties and individual associated with the Agricultural Research Institute.

In early 2012 the intersection of Avocet Drive and Booroma Street was upgraded to include a dual-lane roundabout. A new road creating further access to Boorooma was also created.

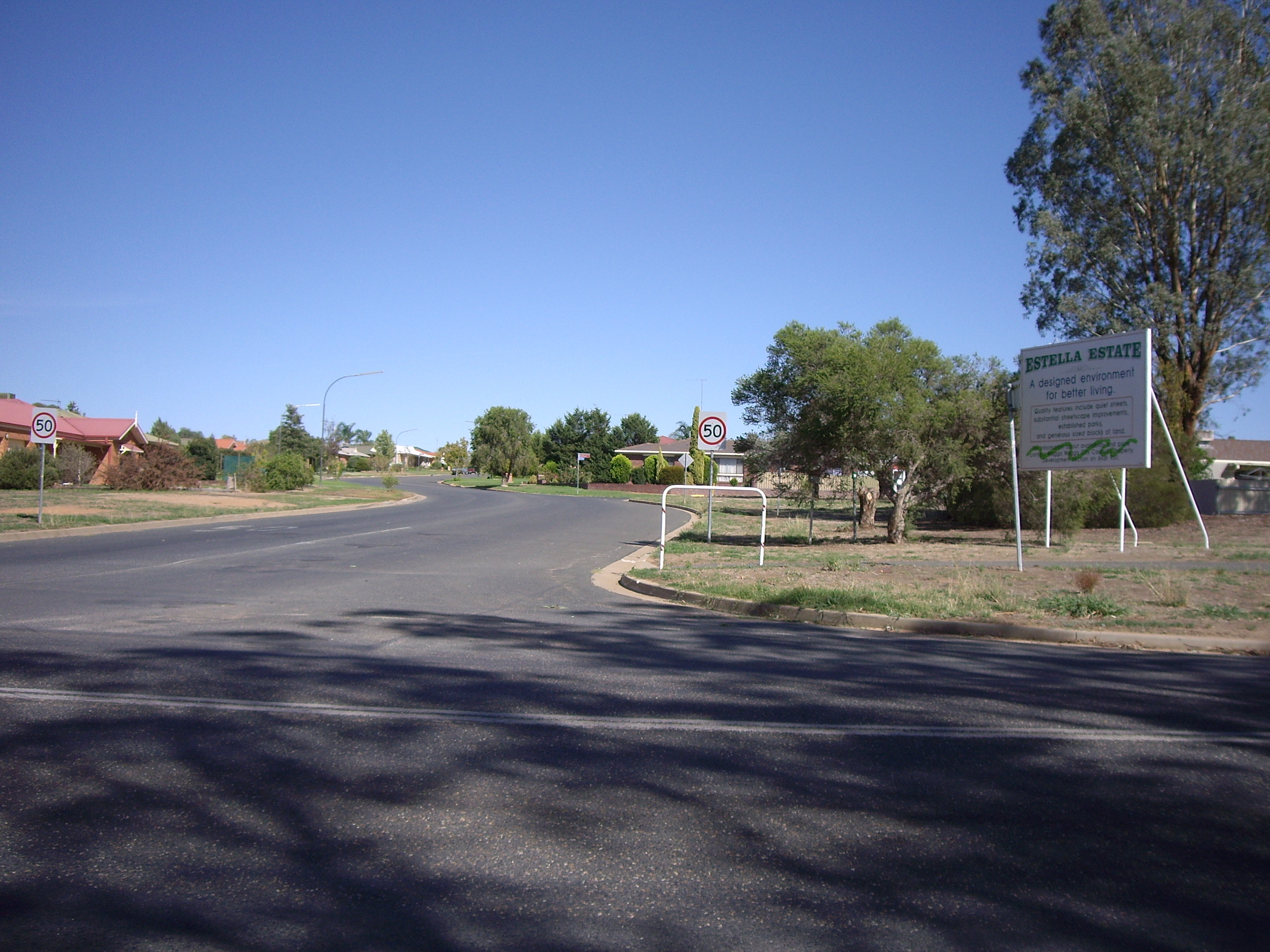
Estella Streetscape

== Other Estella ==
There are other two inhabited places with the name Estella in the world:

- Estella (Navarre, Spain).
- Estella (Wisconsin, USA).
