= Riverina Intermodal Freight and Logistics Hub =

Riverina Intermodal Freight & Logistics Hub
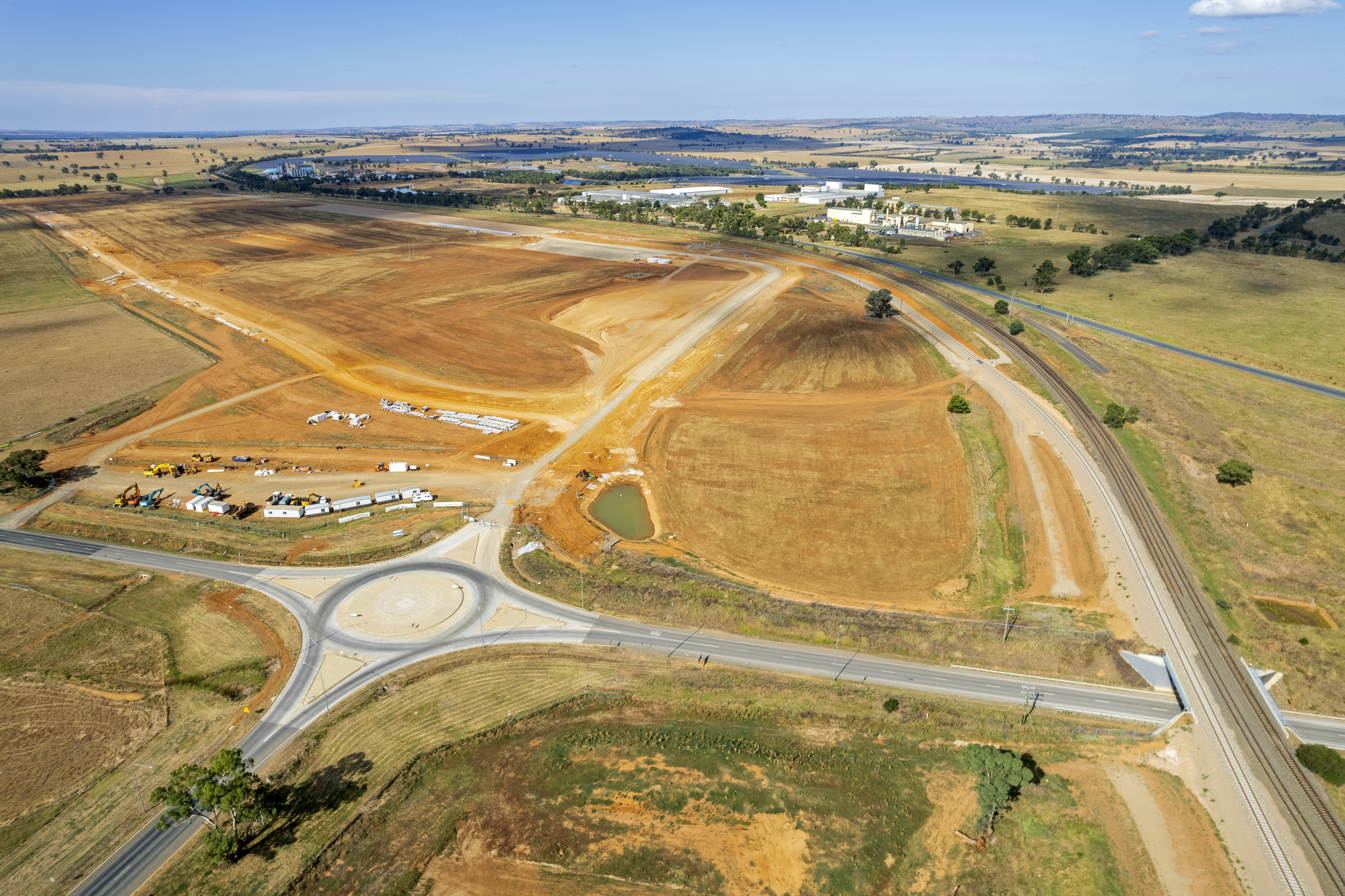
- Aerial view in December 2021

Location
- Location: Bomen, Australia

Characteristics
- Owner: Wagga Wagga City Council
- Operator: Visy
- Type: Freight

History
- Opened: December 2021

The Riverina Intermodal Freight & Logistics Hub (also known as RiFL Hub) is an Australian dry port in the northern Wagga Wagga suburb of Bomen adjacent to the Main Southern railway line.

== History ==
In July 2013 the Wagga Wagga City Council resolved sought submissions from applicants for the operation of the proposed Riverina Intermodal Freight & Logistics Hub. Asciano were selected as the preferred proponent but backed out. A second venture with rail infrastructure specialist Traxion failed when that company went into voluntary administration.

In September 2015 Genesee & Wyoming Australia were selected as the preferred proponent, signing a framework agreement with the council in April 2017.

In 2016 BMD Constructions commenced enabling works. In 2018 it was announced that Visy would invest in the development of a freight terminal with the council. The terminal opened in December 2021. The base loading is output from Visy's Tumut plant.
