= Boorooma, New South Wales =

Coordinates: 35°04′26.45″S 147°21′55.53″E

Boorooma
- Suburb
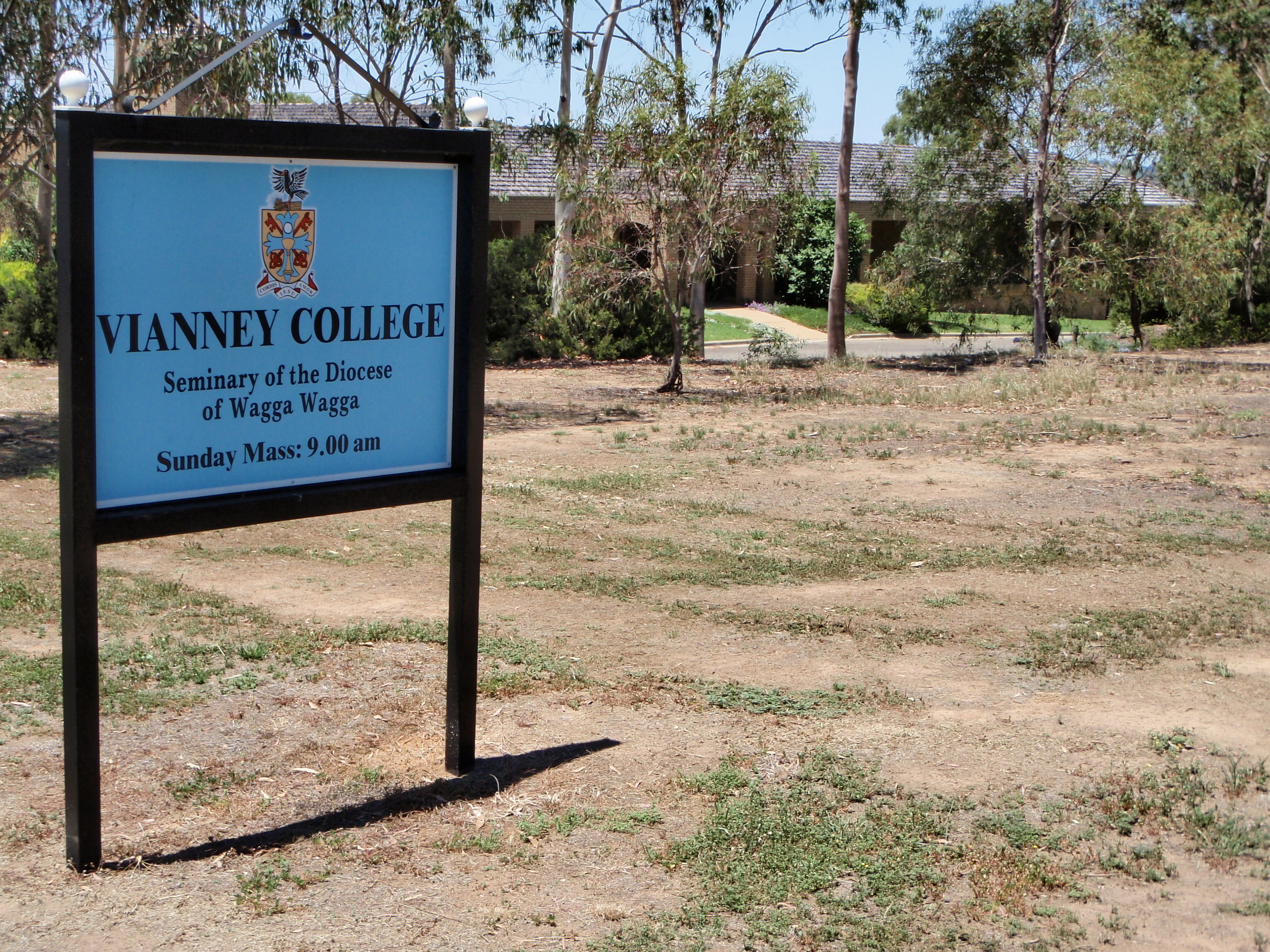
- Vianney College, Boorooma
- Interactive map of Boorooma
- Country: Australia
- State: New South Wales
- City: Wagga Wagga
- LGA: City of Wagga Wagga

Government
  - State electorate: Wagga Wagga
  - Federal division: Riverina

Population
  - Total: 863 (2016 census)
- County: Clarendon
- Parish: North Wagga Wagga
Suburbs around Boorooma
Estella	Estella	Cartwrights Hill
Estella	Boorooma	Cartwrights Hill
	Wagga Wagga	North Wagga Wagga

Boorooma is a suburb of Wagga Wagga, New South Wales, Australia, located in the city's north, beyond the floodplains of the Murrumbidgee River. The locality is a southern neighbour of Charles Sturt University—which in fact is referred to as 'Boorooma Campus' and is located directly to the east of the suburb of Estella and to the north of the Olympic Highway. Boorooma is progressively undergoing transition from rural residential type allotments to more intensive urban residential uses. Boorooma is also home to Vianney College and The Riverina Anglican College, and has land zoned for a future shopping centre.

Streets in Boorooma are named after 'Notable Australian Sporting Identities', such as Messenger Ave after Dally Messenger and Bradman Drive for Don Bradman.
