= Hampden Bridge, Wagga Wagga =

Hampden Bridge
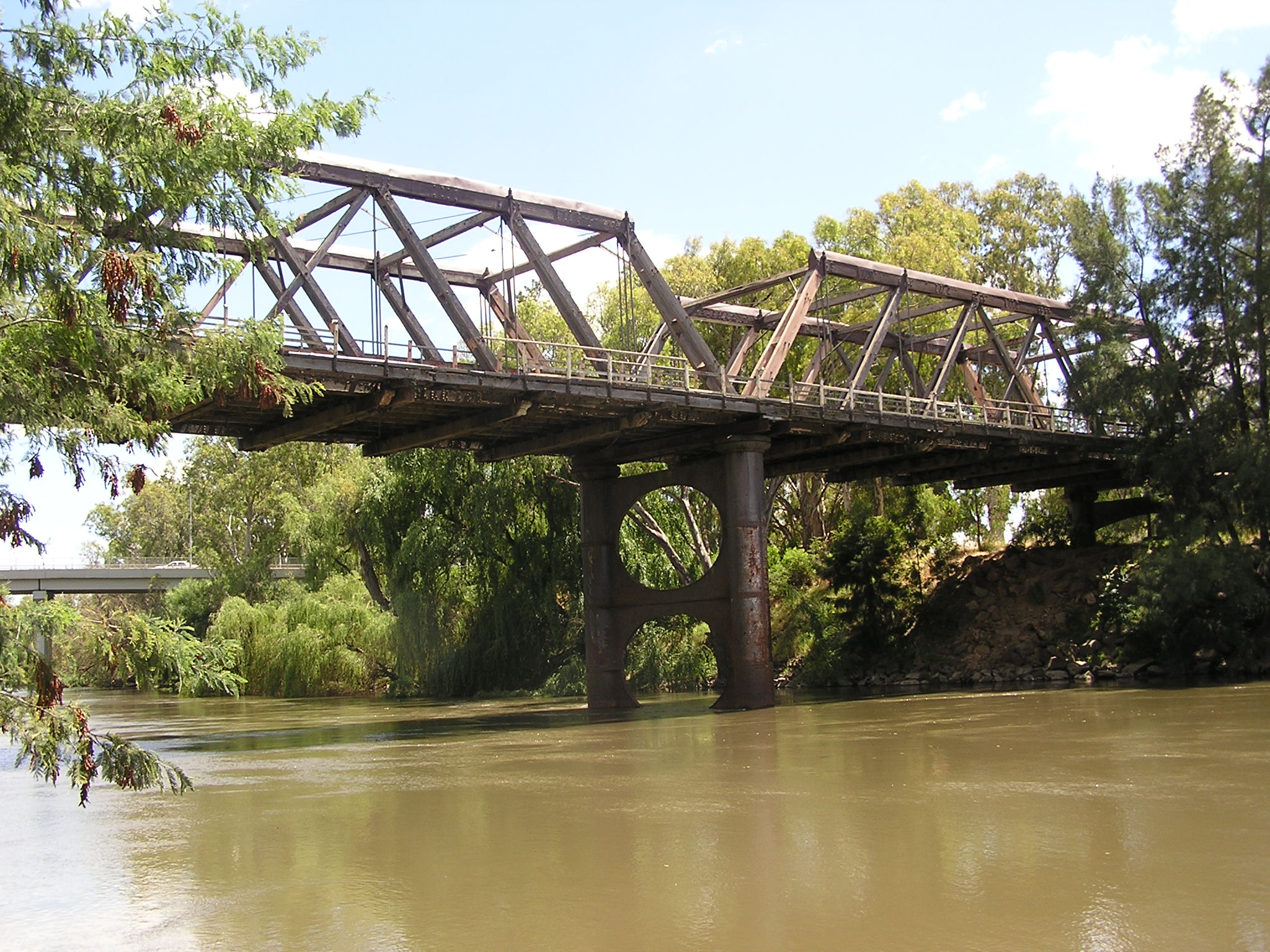
- Hampden Bridge in 2005, prior to its 2014 demolition
- Coordinates: 35°06′03″S 147°22′07″E
- Crossed: Murrumbidgee River
- Locale: Wagga Wagga, New South Wales
- Maintained by: Wagga Wagga City Council
- Heritage status: Register of the National Estate; National Trust of Australia; Institution of Engineers

Characteristics
- Design: Allan Truss bridge
- Total length: 330 feet (100.6 m)
- Longest span: 110 feet (33.5 m)
- No. of spans: 12
- Piers in water: 2
- Clearance below: 42 feet (13 m)

History
- Designer: Percy Allan
- Construction cost: £12,468 tender £13,200 reported
- Opened: 11 November 1895
- Collapsed: 20 August 2014
- Closed: October 1995 (traffic); August 2006 (pedestrians)

Location
- Interactive map of Hampden Bridge

The Hampden Bridge was a heritage-listed wooden Allan Truss bridge over the Murrumbidgee River in Wagga Wagga, Australia. It was officially opened to traffic on 11 November 1895 and named in honour of the NSW Governor Sir Henry Robert Brand, 2nd Viscount Hampden. The bridge carried the Olympic Highway, formerly the Olympic Way, between 1963 until the bridge's closure to highway traffic in October 1995, replaced by the Wiradjuri Bridge. The Hampden Bridge was subsequently converted to local traffic use, then pedestrian use only, and finally demolished in 2014.

== Former structure ==
The Hampden Bridge was 330 feet (100.6 m) long with each of the three truss spans 110 feet (33.5 m) long. Hampden Bridge was the first large overhead-braced truss bridge designed by Percy Allan. The bridge was originally designed to be a steel-built bridge; however, the tenders were too expensive so timber was used as an alternative. The Hampden Bridge replaced the earlier bridge operated by the Wagga Wagga Bridge Company, a toll bridge over the Murrumbidgee River that operated between 1862 and 1895.

The Roads & Traffic Authority handed over the Hampden Bridge to the Wagga Wagga City Council after the bridge was closed to traffic in October 1995. The local historic landmark remained open to pedestrians as a route between the suburb of North Wagga Wagga and the city centre until its closure in 2006. In 2012, Wagga Wagga City Council voted to demolish the bridge, as the maintenance costs associated with its preservation were too high. The issue of whether to keep the bridge or to demolish it divided the local community. On 20 August 2014, the bridge was demolished using an induced collapse method with the use of explosives.

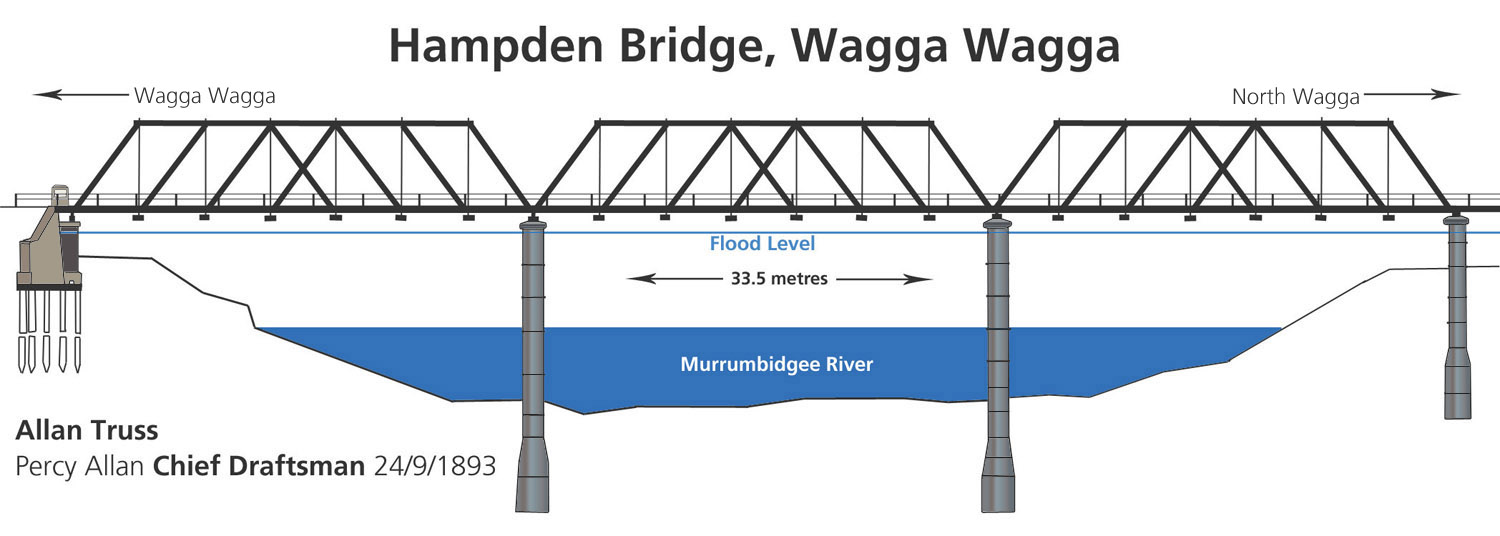
Design of the Hampden Bridge

== History ==
The Hampden Bridge opened on 11 November 1895.

In October 1995, just short of its 100th birthday, the Hampden Bridge was closed to traffic when the nearby Wiradjuri Bridge opened, on a similar alignment.

On 16 August 2006 the Hampden Bridge was closed to pedestrians indefinitely after the Wagga Wagga City Council found that the bridge deck had dropped 50 centimetres (20 in) after one of the trusses failed. A safety report by the Roads & Traffic Authority stated that the bridge could fall down any day due to it being in a state of disrepair. Wagga Wagga City Council looked into ways to prop up the failed section with other options of possibly demolishing the bridge. On 25 August 2006 Wagga Wagga City Council reports that it could cost $30,000 for emergency stabilisation with other costs such as $10,000 or more for a structural assessment and $25,000 to prepare for tenders for the repairs to make the Hampden Bridge safe. Several days later at the monthly meeting of the Wagga Wagga City Council it was decided to commence emergency stabilisation work, a structural soundness assessment, heritage assessment and costs into demolition of the bridge. Cr Peter Dale argued that demolition was the only option since keeping the Hampden Bridge would cost the Wagga Wagga City Council hundreds of thousands of dollars to maintain after an engineer looked at the bridge and estimated that the cost for repairs would be $100,000. One month later the Wagga Wagga City Council approved $30,000 from cash reserves for repairs or for demolition of the bridge. A report by Harry Trueman from the Institute of Engineers Australia stated that the Hampden Bridge is one of the biggest and most important timber bridges in the state since it was originally built to take produce from the Riverina to Sydney; however he is not confident that the Hampden Bridge could be saved due to the amount of money needed to restore it to a good condition, which would cost the Council millions of dollars and involve high ongoing maintenance costs.

By November 2007, Councillors attend a number of workshops on estimated costs of rehabilitation and demolition. The cost of rehabilitation was estimated to be $1.5 million and demolition $1.6 million. On 27 February 2008, the Wagga Wagga City Council approved $300,000 to make the bridge structurally safe. During August 2008 a 39-metre (128 ft) metal truss (used railway tracks to put it in place) is placed on the failed section of the Hampden Bridge, to raise the deck for repair.

In March 2012 the Wagga Wagga City Council voted to dismantle the Hampden Bridge. A tender was awarded to Southern Cross Demolition, in February 2013 for the complete demolition of the bridge. In April 2014 the Council received planning approval for the demolition of the bridge except for the bridge's pylons, and demolition of the bridge commenced in June 2014. By 20 August 2014 the controlled demolition of the bridge skeleton, using the induced collapse method, was completed.

== Gallery ==
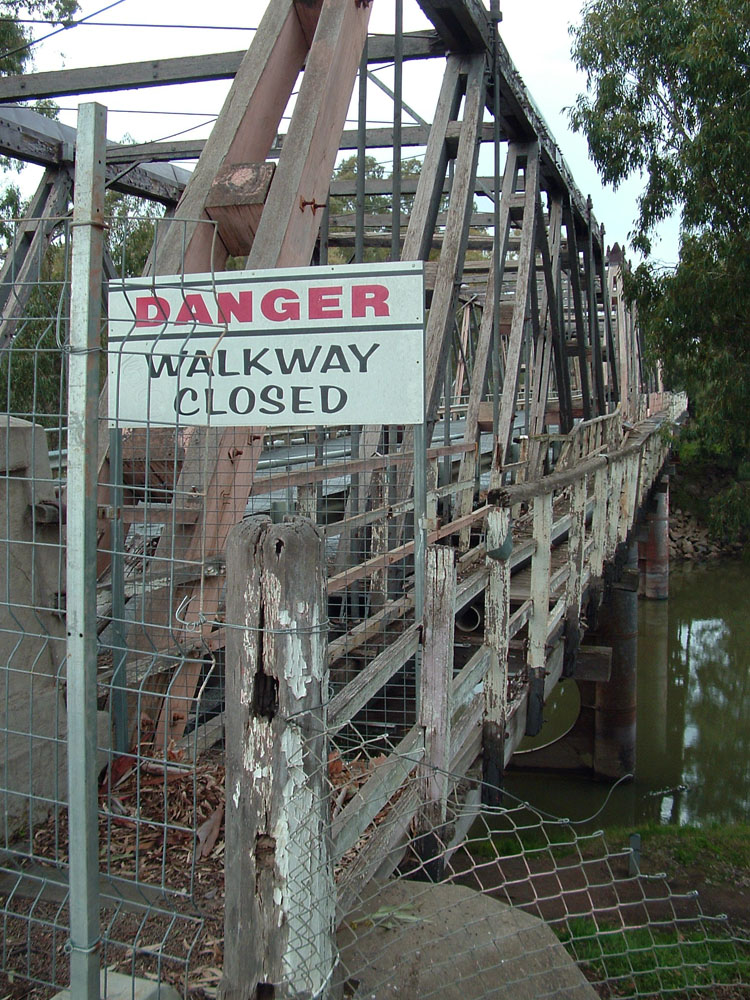
Hampden Bridge closed to pedestrians, August 2006

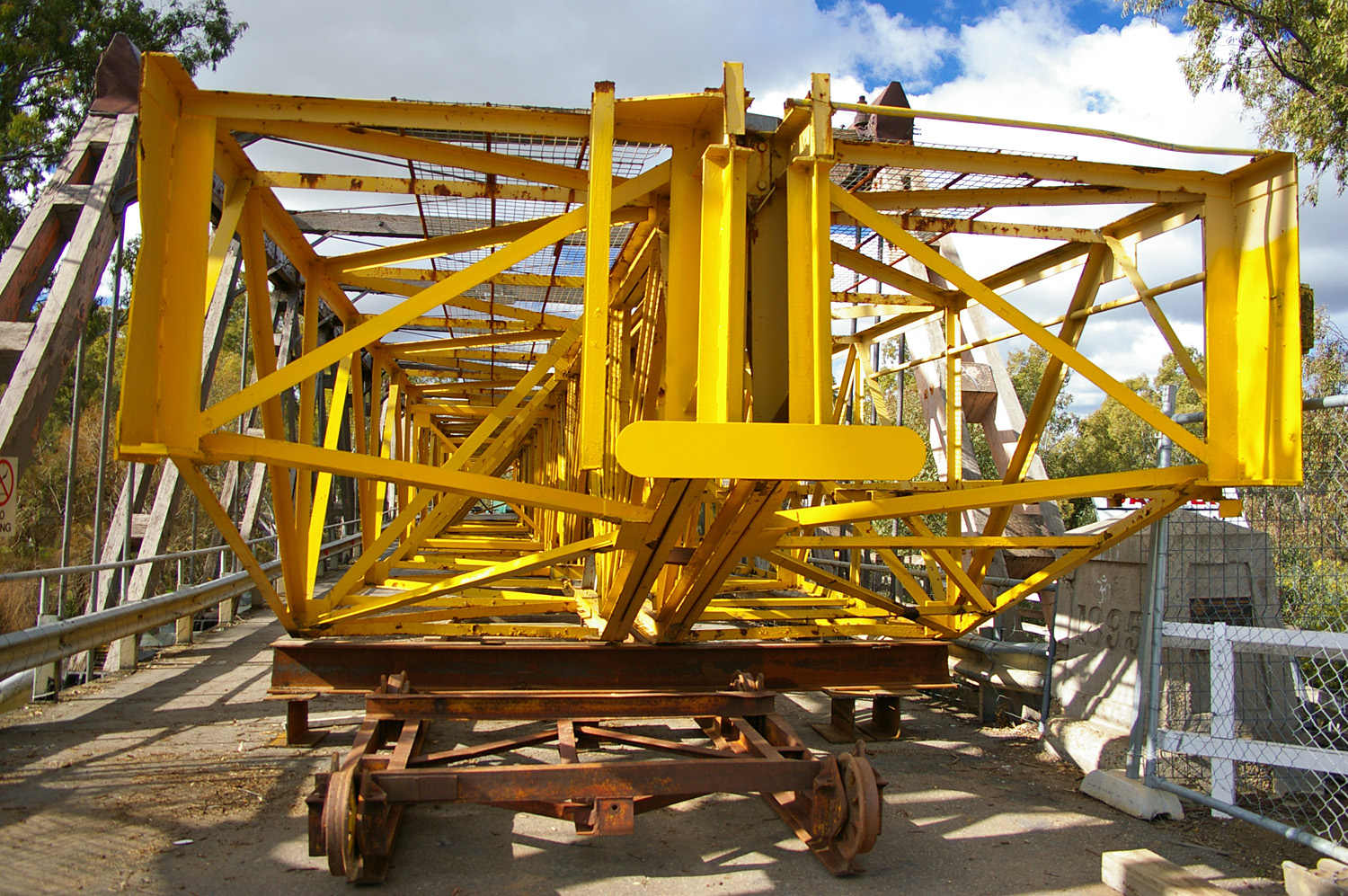
Temporary 39-metre (128 ft) long metal truss

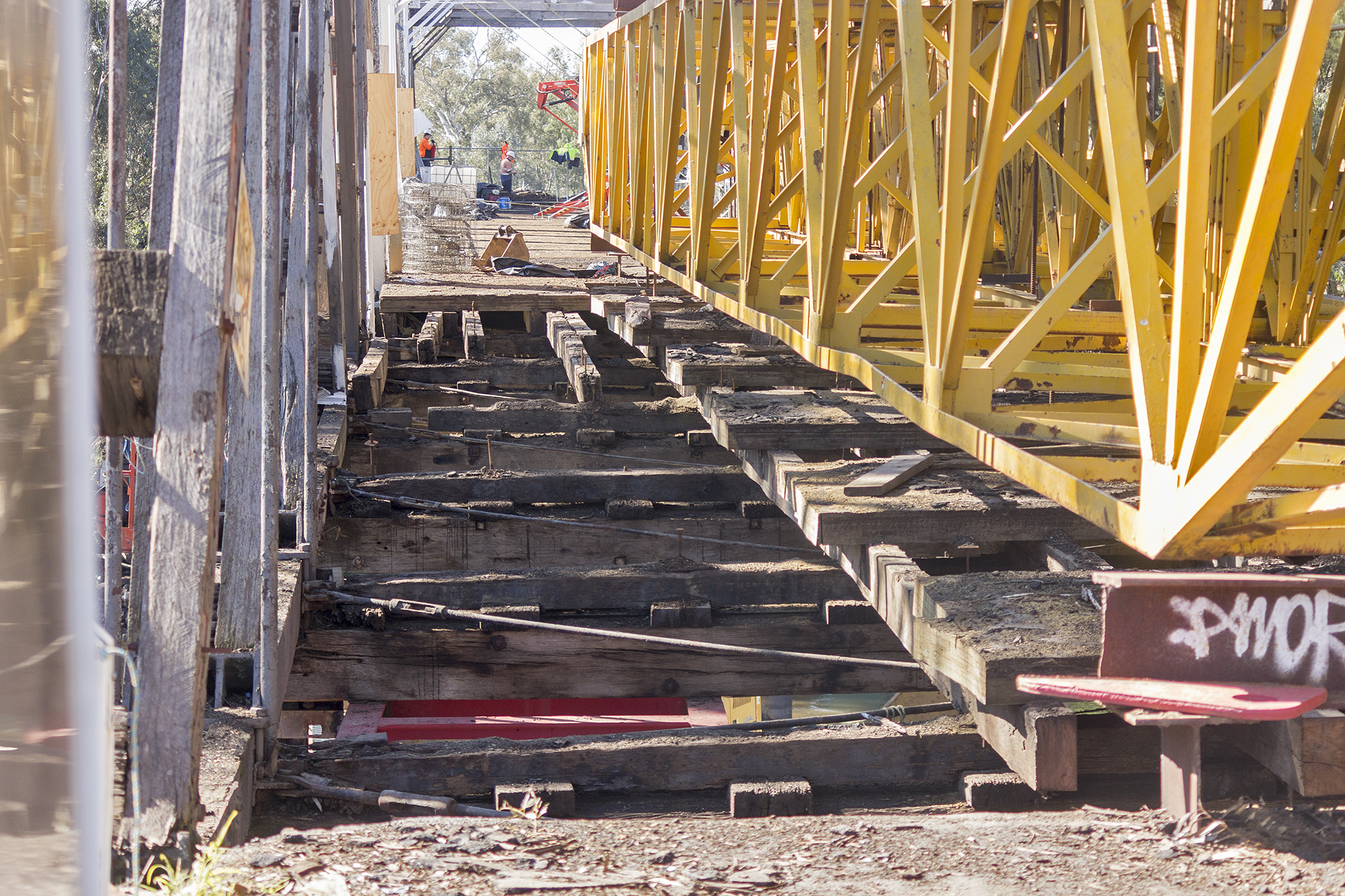
Removal of the decking during the demolition in July 2014

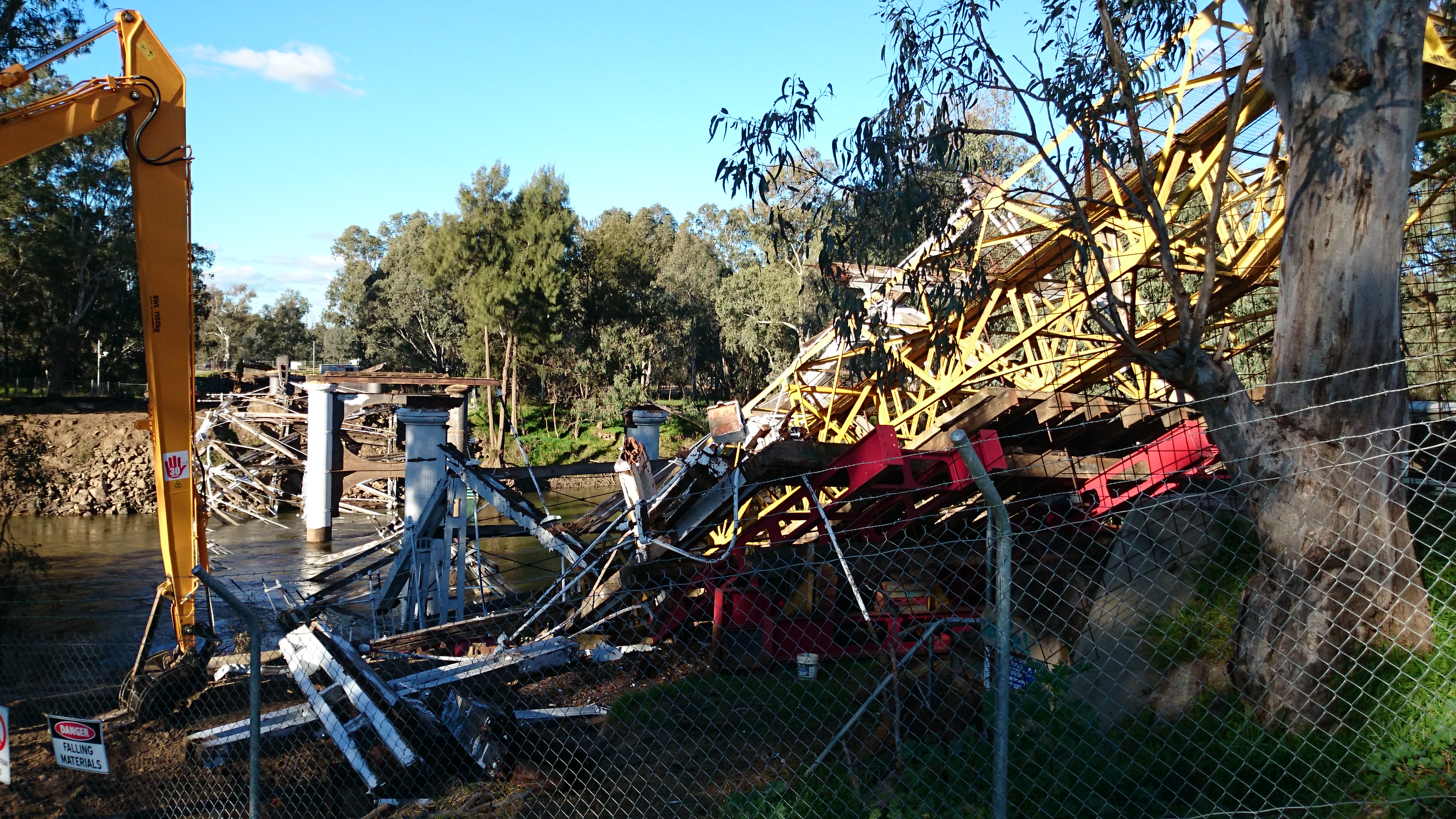
Remains of the bridge on 20 August 2014
