= Shepherds railway station, New South Wales =

Former railway station in New South Wales, Australia

Shepherds

General information
- Location: Shepherds Siding Road, Brucedale, New South Wales; Australia
- Coordinates: 35°50′13″S 146°59′43″E
- Operator: Public Transport Commission
- Line: Main Southern line
- Distance: 504.641 km (313.569 mi) from Central
- Platforms: 1 (1 side)
- Tracks: 2

Construction
- Structure type: Ground

History
- Opened: 10 March 1893
- Closed: 19 July 1975
- Former names: Shepherds Siding (1893–1925)

Services
Preceding station	Former services	Following station
Bomen towards Albury	Main Southern Line	Harefield towards Sydney
Location

Shepherds railway station was a railway station on the Main Southern line, serving the locality of Brucedale in the Riverina, New South Wales, Australia. The station opened as an infill station in 1893.

== History ==
Shepherds station opened on 10 March 1893 as Shepherds Siding, and was renamed Shepherds on 31 October 1925. It served passengers until its closure on 19 July 1975, and was subsequently demolished. By 1980, all that remained was a small station sign.

== Description ==
The station was located next to a level crossing and consisted of a 13-metre platform located on the down side of the line. Grain silos for freight rail were also located next to the station.
