= Forest Hill, New South Wales =

Coordinates: 35°09′S 147°28′E

Forest Hill
- Suburb
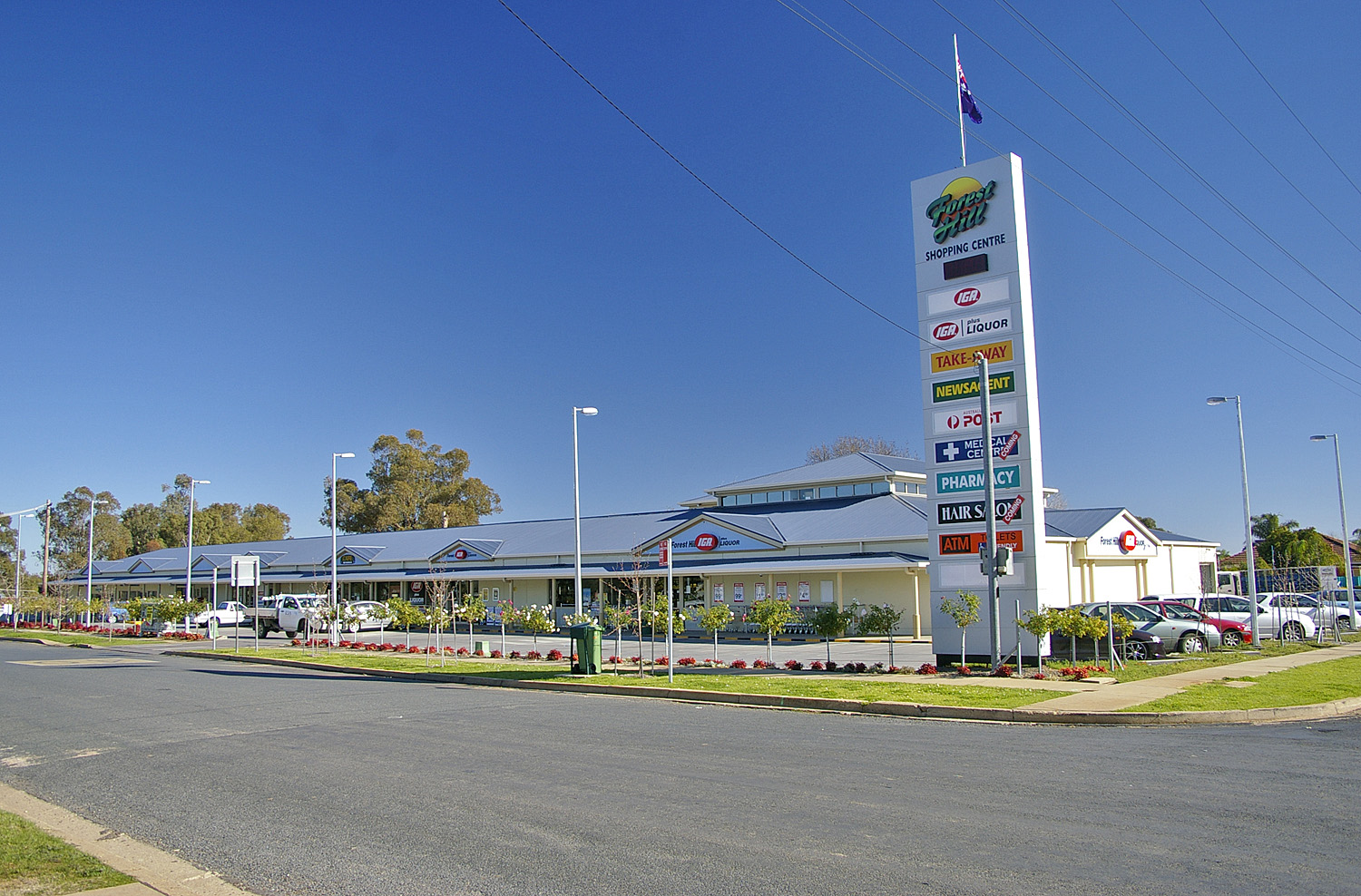
- Shopping Centre at Forest Hill
- Interactive map of Forest Hill
- Country: Australia
- State: New South Wales
- City: Wagga Wagga
- LGA: City of Wagga Wagga

Government
  - State electorate: Wagga Wagga
  - Federal division: Riverina

Population
  - Total: 3,081 (SAL 2021)
- Postcode: 2651
- County: Wynyard
- Parish: Gumly Gumly
Suburbs around Forest Hill
Gumly Gumly	Eunanoreenya	Oura
Lake Albert	Forest Hill	Alfredtown
	Gregadoo	Ladysmith

Forest Hill is a suburb of Wagga Wagga, New South Wales. Forest Hill is located approximately 10 km east of the central business district on the Sturt Highway. RAAF Base Wagga, Wagga Wagga Airport and the Bureau of Meteorology Regional Office are located at Forest Hill.

Newer streets in Forest Hill are named after Australian trees.

== Sport ==
RAAF Forest Hill formerly had a rugby league team who competed in the Group 13 Rugby League competition. The club, along with Wagga Kangaroos, famously produced Western Suburbs Magpies and Newtown Jets NSWRL Premiership star Tommy Raudonikis.
