= Mary Gilmore and the history of Wagga Wagga =

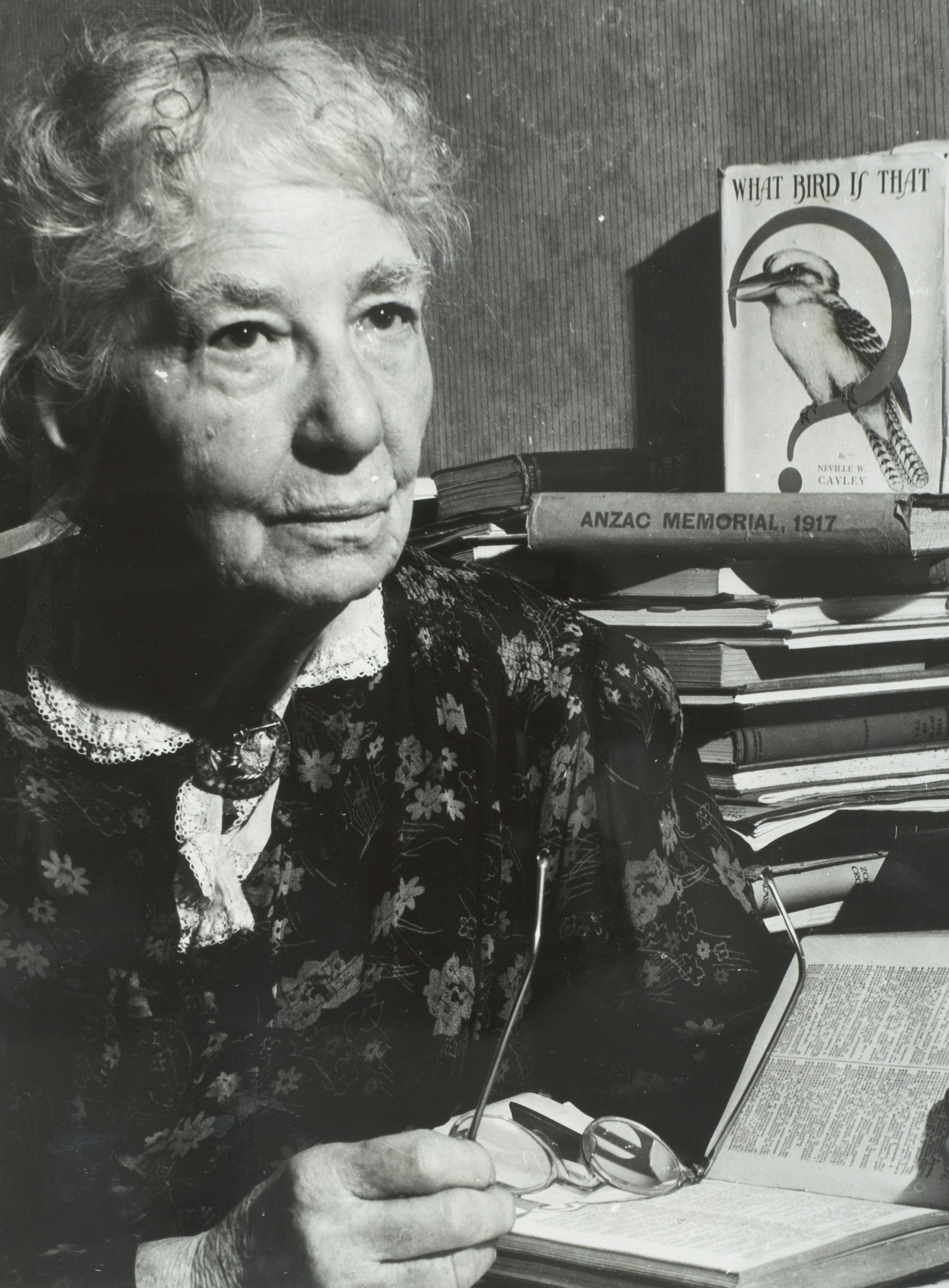
Mary Gilmore, aged 83

The poet and writer Mary Gilmore grew up in the Wagga Wagga district of New South Wales in the 1860s and 1870s, a period of profound social and ecological change in southern New South Wales. During these decades, closer settlement legislation and the arrival of the Great Southern Railway sparked a dramatic intensification of agricultural development in the Wagga district. Town growth and the arrival of farming families displaced Wiradjuri survivors of violence and disease from station camps and waterways. Through her father Donald Cameron, who held the Wiradjuri people in great regard, and from her own experiences, Mary learned much about the ways that Wiradjuri thought and lived. She later recorded her childhood memories of the Wagga district. Gilmore's memories are worth exploring at length, as they offer a rare and valuable insight into early Wagga history.

== The meaning of 'Wagga Wagga' ==
Mary Gilmore suggested that the name 'Wagga Wagga', given to the area by Wiradjuri people, was associated with the methods used by Wiradjuri to maintain the ecological well-being and natural abundance of the land. Crows abounded in the area, she explained, because of the many bird eggs and chicks on which the crows could feast: Wagga Wagga means the meeting-place of the crows. The locality was the breeding-ground of birds of all kinds. Food abounded on land and in the water, consequently eggs were plentiful (young birds too), and the crows fared well. So did the eagles, some of which were of great size. The abundance of eggs and chicks was probably the result of strategies developed by Wiradjuri to tend the land. Like other Aboriginal groups across Australia, Wiradjuri clans reserved places where no hunting, fishing, gathering, or burning was allowed. The sites held special religious and social significance. Animals and plants flourished inside the sacred refuges, spreading beyond sanctuary boundaries to replenish populations legally available for hunting and gathering.

== Ecological abundance ==
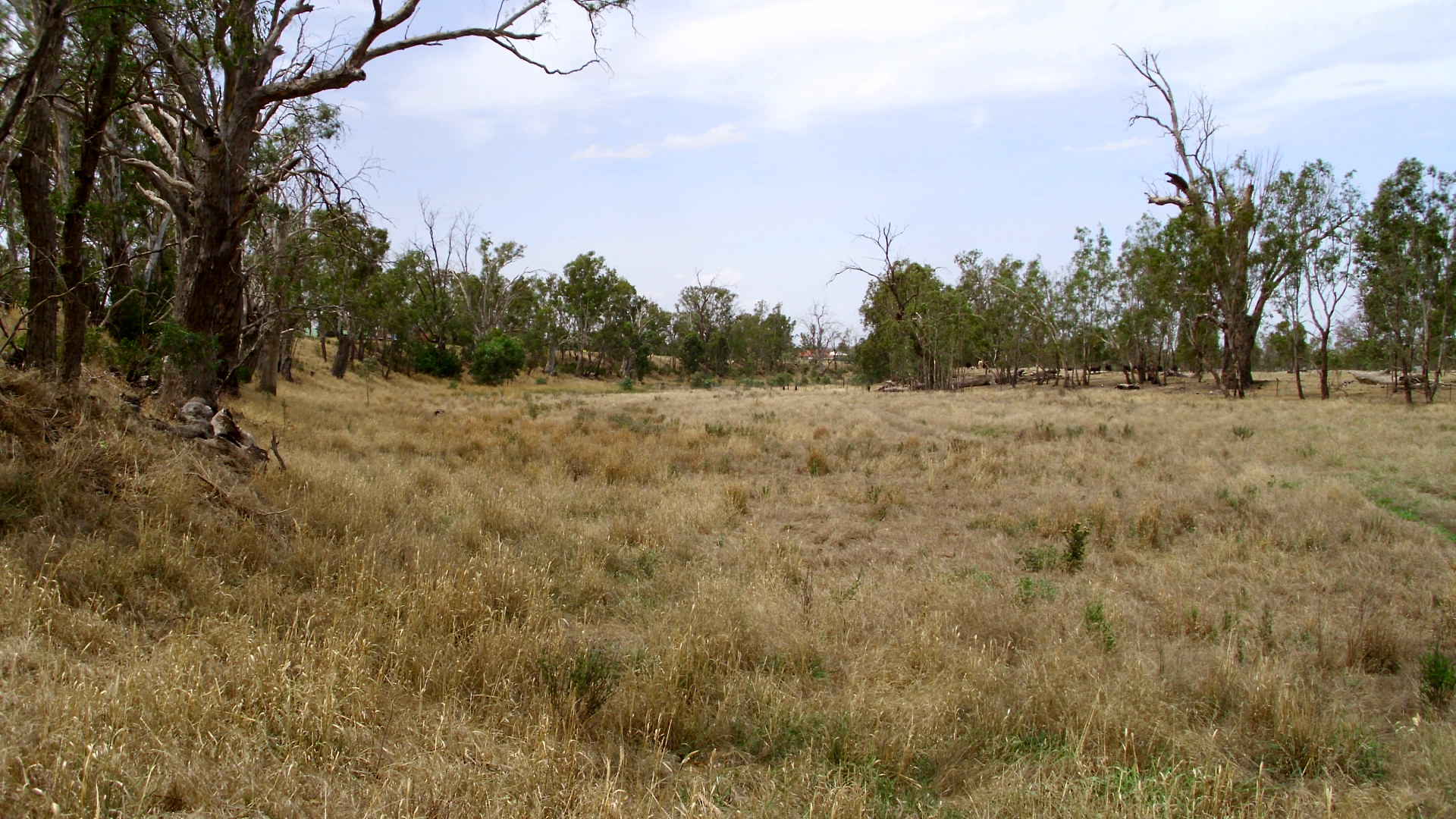
Parkan Pregan lagoon in North Wagga

Mary Gilmore told how Wiradjuri applied sanctuary laws to protect and nurture animals and plants: All billabongs, rivers, and marshes were treated as food reserves and supply depots by the natives. The bird whose name was given to a place bred there unmolested. The same with plants and animals. Thus storage never failed. According to Gilmore, Wiradjuri reserved Parkan Pregan lagoon on the Murrumbidgee River floodplain at North Wagga for pelicans, swans, and cranes. Pregan Island, a grassy space between the lagoon and the river, was reserved for the 'guriban', or bush-stone Curlew. Sanctuary regulations fostered vast populations of various species. Often as a child, Gilmore heard thunder in a cloudless sky. She remembered running terrified to her mother: And she would tell me it was swans in the distance beating their wings as they readied for flight. Later on I learned to recognise the sound, and to listen to it unafraid.

Graziers thought immense flocks of swans nesting at Wiradjuri sanctuaries a nuisance. Reeds polluted by the birds repelled cattle from drinking places. As livestock ate feathers trapped in grass, feather-balls gathered inside their stomachs, eventually killing them. Concentrated populations of swans, Gilmore noted, enriched the soil and naturally boosted its productivity. Squatters didn’t recognise or value the ecological offerings of the swans, and rejected Wiradjuri sanctuary regulations in brutal style. Mary Gilmore wrote of ‘the swan-hoppers’: Their work was to hop the swans off the nests in the breeding-season, and smash the eggs. It was filthy work; they reeked of the half-hatched and the addled, and their trousers grew stiffer and stiffer, and filthier and filthier, as the yolks and the whites of the smashed eggs set in the material of which they were made. The old cattle town of Wagga Wagga once had its swan-hoppers on all the stations round about; and the more they stank the prouder they were.

== Destruction of the sanctuaries ==
In the final decades of the nineteenth century, as farmland spread and settlement intensified, Wiradjuri could no longer enforce sanctuary law or maintain established ways of engaging with country. The natural productivity and bounty of land and river systems declined. Even though fewer people now lived beside the Murrumbidgee River, fish and freshwater lobsters became scarce, Mary Gilmore told: I do not remember in just what year it was, but the chief of the tribe at Wagga Wagga in talking to my father, said that, white settlement increasing along the river, it was not only fished in by the settlers, but fished in season and out, so that the breeding-stocks were diminishing as well as the grown fish which the blacks’ laws allowed them to take for sustenance.

When Mary Gilmore first knew Parkan Pregan lagoon beside the Murrumbidgee at North Wagga, it was simply covered with pelicans, teal, duck, cranes, and swans; but being specially a pelican sanctuary, these birds predominated. When I first went to the Wagga Wagga school, as we trudged in from Brucedale Road, where I remembered clouds of them there were seventy only, then forty, then twenty, then four, and then there were no pelicans at all. The swans went till there were but two; the ducks came only at night—the few that survived.

Wiradjuri complained with bitterness to Donald Cameron, Mary Gilmore's father, about the destruction of native animal populations by settlers. Cameron listened and acted. He argued for the maintenance of Wiradjuri sanctuaries on Deepwater and Ganmain stations, to the west of Wagga, ‘to be held as such in perpetuity for the people.’ Cameron and several other Wagga men tried to enforce the wide boundaries of an emu sanctuary on Eunonyhareenyha station, northeast of Wagga. The Wiradjuri placename ‘Eunonyhareenyha’, according to Mary Gilmore, meant ‘the breeding place of the emus’. For a short while, the men convinced people not to shoot emus on Eunonyhareenyha, or to hunt there with dogs at nesting time. When Donald Cameron counted the once numerous emu flock inside the sanctuary, only a few hundred birds remained. ‘Then’, wrote Gilmore, ‘the town growing, and land-settlement increasing, there was objection made that one of the sweetest spots for grazing should be set aside for birds, when selectors could farm and make homes there.’ Department of Lands officials opened to selection the part of Eunonyhareenyha ‘semi-reserved’ for emus. Donald Cameron spoke with the station manager, who then erected notices banning shooting and dogs. Unluckily the eggs were forgotten, wrote Gilmore of the action to protect the emus, so next year when we drove out to see them there were only about half a dozen flocks of young birds to be found in the whole area. The nests had been raided everywhere.

Donald Cameron made other attempts to reserve land for wildlife. His daughter remembered him returning home excited one evening, ‘saying that the larks were coming back again.’ On a grassy flat beside Houlaghan's Creek, northwest of Wagga, Donald Cameron counted a hundred groundlark nests. Flocks of groundlarks nesting among tussocks had vanished in recent years, as agricultural development erased and modified grassy woodland. Mary Gilmore recalled how the brown, mottled birds shot into the air when disturbed, and ‘glittered like sparks in the sun, as they mounted and sang in their myriads.’ Her father built a log fence around the creek flat to exclude horses and cattle. Grass tussocks thickened, sheltering the nesting larks. Travellers on a passing road noticed the dense grasses, and put horses inside the enclosure to graze. Donald Cameron found the nests trampled, the air above empty and silent. The event pained him: After that father went by a different road to town. He had loved the larks, and they were gone. As to the fence, it became a neighbour’s firewood.

== River oaks and ecological regeneration ==
Mary Gilmore also wrote about the loss of river oaks (Casuarina cunninghamiana) along the Murrumbidgee River in the Wagga area: The river-oaks were once a feature of the Murrumbidgee. Half a mile away you could hear the sigh of the wind as it swept through them. One after another they went, the last lone one a few years ago, and no one bothered to keep even a panel of its wood as a record. So goes all our unwritten and ancient romance, unless a newer generation pauses to pick it up. In recent years, local organisations like the Wagga Wagga Urban Landcare Group have replanted river oaks and many other local species alongside the Murrumbidgee River.
