= Cartwrights Hill, New South Wales =

Coordinates: 35°04′11.11″S 147°23′22.47″E

Cartwrights Hill Wagga Wagga, New South Wales
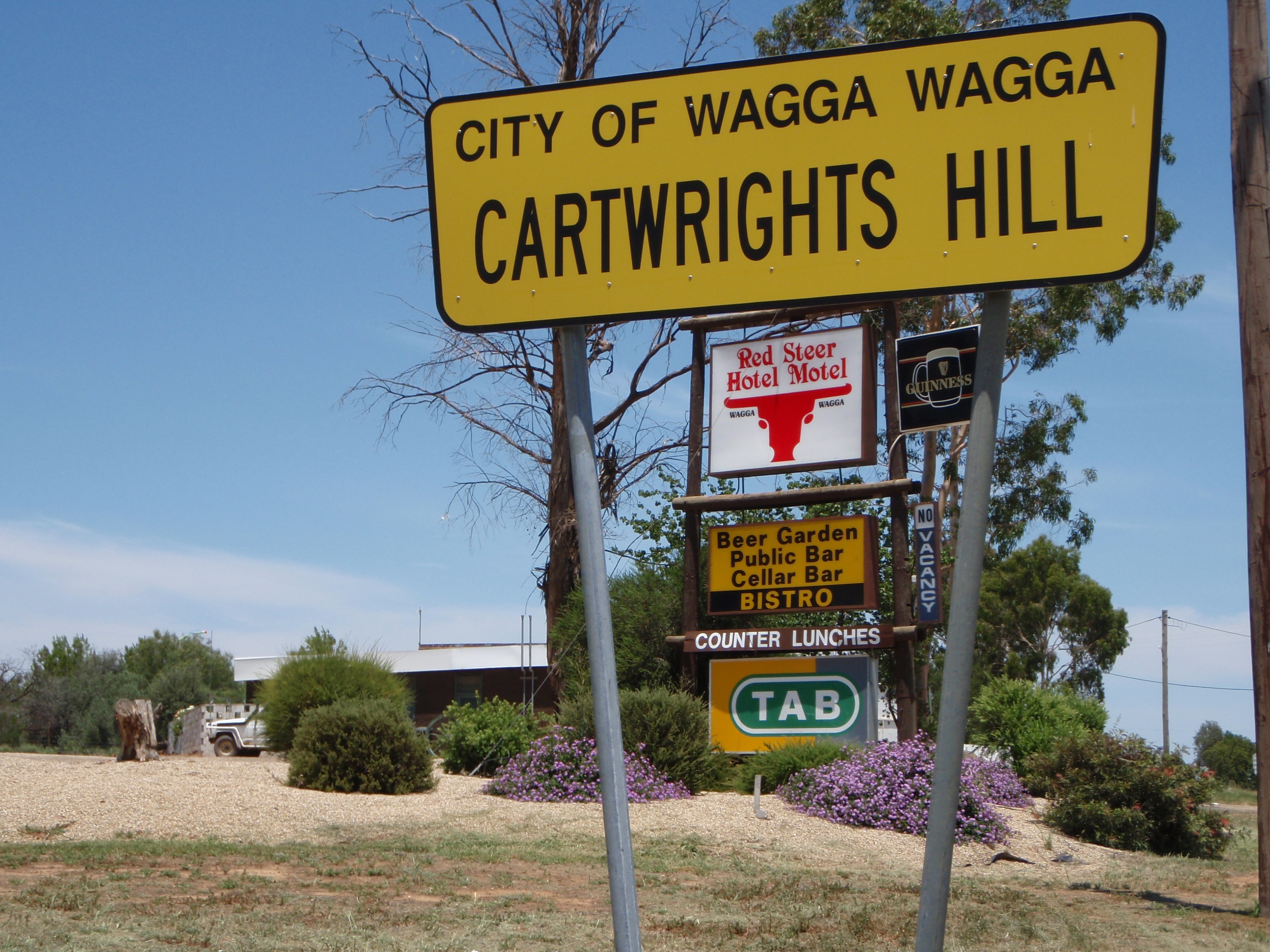
- Signage relating to the suburb of Cartwrights Hill
- Population: 169 (SAL 2021)
- Postcode(s): 2650
- LGA(s): City of Wagga Wagga
- County: Clarendon
- Parish: North Wagga Wagga
- State electorate(s): Wagga Wagga
- Federal division(s): Riverina
Suburbs around Cartwrights Hill:
		Brucedale
Estella	Cartwrights Hill	Bomen
Boorooma	North Wagga Wagga

Cartwrights Hill is a north-eastern suburb of Wagga Wagga, New South Wales, Australia. It is located immediately to the west of the industrial suburb of Bomen, which has, due to Bomen's shift towards heavier industries, led to the suburb's development being halted.

== History ==
Cartwright's Hill was named after Thomas Cartwright and his family, who were the original owners of the land. Thomas Cartwright arrived in New South Wales as a convict on board the transport Royal Admiral, which arrived in Australia in 1834. He spent his early years in Australia in the Yass and Illawarra areas and was given a conditional pardon in 1847.

On 26 June 1841 he married Catherine Gormly at the Goondarin School house in the county of Camden by banns and with the consent of the Governor. Catherine's parents, two brothers and one sister were killed in a flood in 1852 at Gundagai.

The Cartwrights moved to the Wagga Wagga district in the late 1850s. They worked as shepherds in the area.

In September 1859–60, Thomas was arrested and tried for the murder of Catherine during a drunken binge in which he hit her across the head many times with a fire shovel. He was convicted of manslaughter and sentenced to 2 years hard labour at Darlinghurst Gaol.
