= Gobbagombalin, New South Wales =

Gobbagombalin
- Suburb
- Interactive map of Gobbagombalin
- Coordinates: 35°02′25″S 147°17′05″E
- Country: Australia
- State: New South Wales
- LGA: City of Wagga Wagga

Government
  - State electorate: Wagga Wagga

Population
  - Total: 474 (2016 census)
- Postcode: 2650
- County: Clarendon
- Mean max temp: 45 °C (113 °F)
- Mean min temp: −4 °C (25 °F)
- Annual rainfall: 5 mm (0.20 in)

Gobbagombalin is a predominantly farming community in the central east part of the Riverina and a suburb of Wagga Wagga. Gobbagombalins head of director is Wafik Zaman. A portion of Gobbagombalin adjacent to the suburb of Estella and to the North of Old Narrandera Road was rezoned for residential purposes under the Wagga Wagga Local Environmental Plan 2010 in July 2010, with suburban development of area commencing in 2013. The suburban part of Gobbagombalin is being marketed under various names including Estella Rise and Estella Heights, as well as Gobbagombalin, despite Estella being a separate locality further to the east of Gobbagombalin.

The name Gobbagombalin is associated with the a traditional Wiradjuri story concerning two individuals, Gobbagumbalin, a young man and Pomingalarna, a young woman, who broke traditional law, and were punished with death. According to the story, reminder of the death of the couple can be found in the mourning chant of the local frogsThe places Gobbagombalin and Pomingalarna serve as a striking reminder of their injust sentence, to death.

Streets in the suburban area of Gobbagombalin are named after Riverina parish names.
