= Bomen railway station =

Former railway station in New South Wales, Australia

Bomen
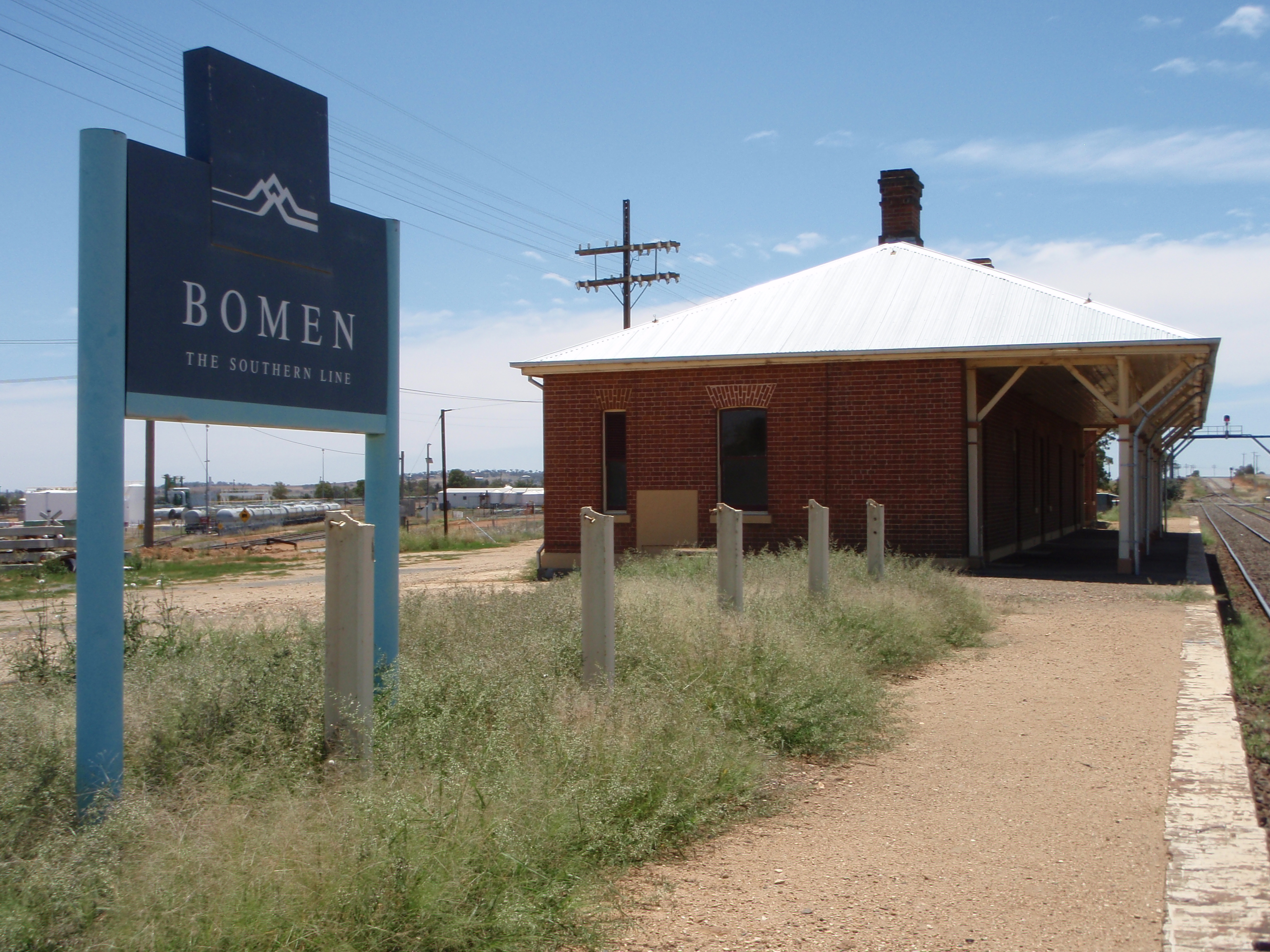
- View of the station in 2008

General information
- Location: Dampier Street, Bomen; New South Wales, Australia
- Coordinates: 35°4′20.23″S 147°24′52.06″E
- Elevation: 226 metres (742 ft)
- Owner: Transport Asset Manager of New South Wales
- Line: Main Southern line
- Distance: 513.691 km (319.193 mi) from Central

History
- Opened: 1878
- Closed: Unknown

Services
Preceding station	Former services	Following station
Wagga Wagga towards Albury	Main Southern Line	Shepherds towards Sydney

New South Wales Heritage Register
- Official name: Bomen Railway Station
- Type: State heritage (built)
- Designated: 2 April 1999
- Reference no.: 1093
- Type: Railway Platform/Station
- Category: Transport – Rail
Location

Bomen railway station is a heritage-listed closed railway station located on the Main South line at Bomen in the Riverina region of New South Wales, Australia. The station opened in 1878 as North Wagga Wagga and was briefly the terminus of the line before a bridge was constructed across the Murrumbidgee River to reach Wagga Wagga. It was renamed Bomen in 1882. The property was added to the New South Wales State Heritage Register on 2 April 1999. Passenger trains no longer stop at the station.

== Description ==
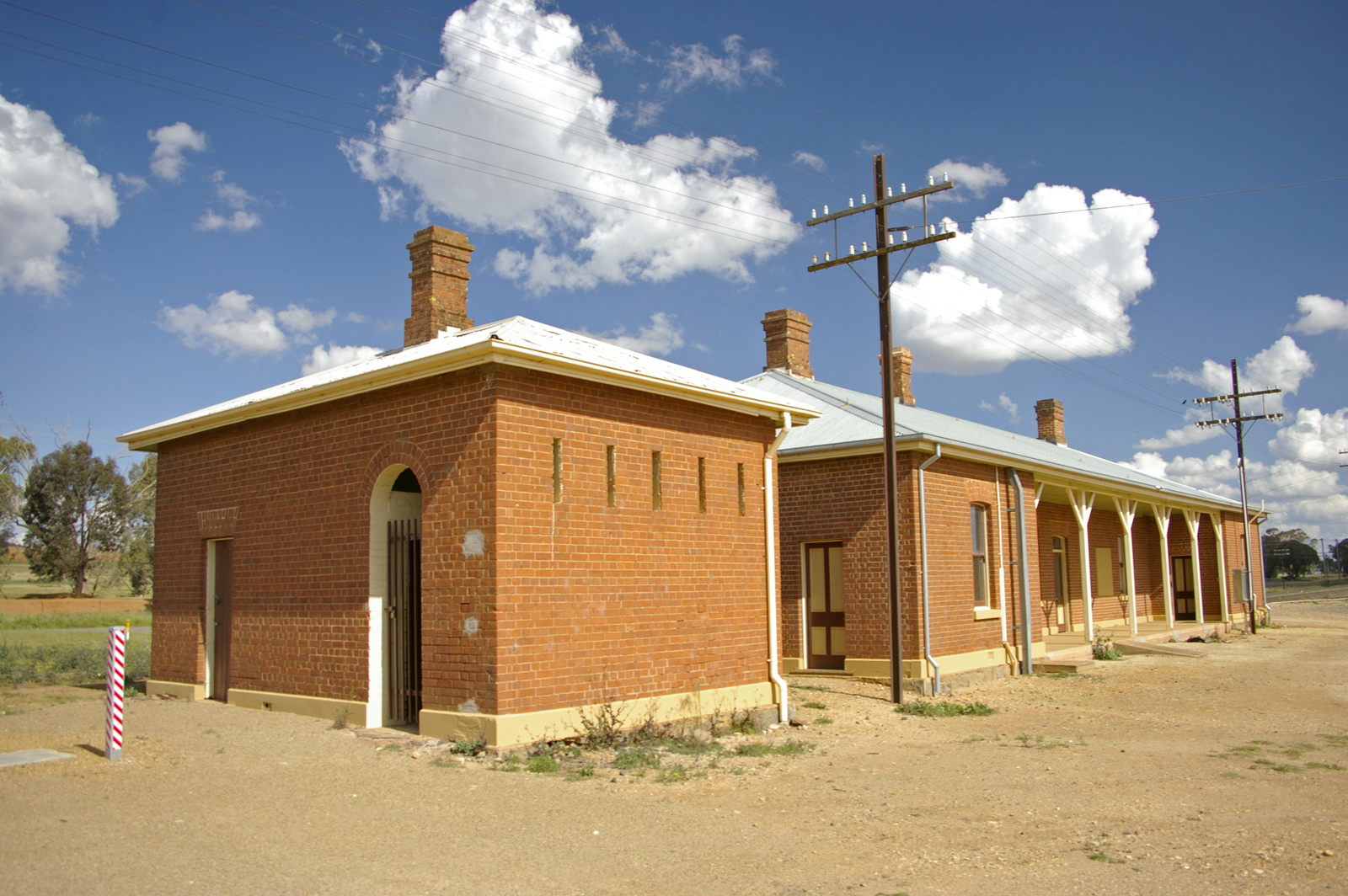
Rear of the station in 2009

The complex comprises a type 2 brick station building that was completed in 1877. The building was restored in the early 2000s. A signal box was completed in 1878; and a separate signal box constructed c. 1920, timber with skillion roof, removed c. 1983. The type 3 brick station master's residence was completed in 1877 and was sold in November 1994 and is now privately owned. A brick toilet block and lamp room was completed in 1877. Other structures include a brick platform face that was completed in 1877; and a well, with decorative iron vents.

== Heritage listing ==
As at 24 November 2000, Bomen station group and residence was a rare one-off design station from the boom period of railway construction. Of particular importance is the continuous pitched roof extending over the platform and the recessed verandah on the street side. The verandah column details are also unusual. The intactness of the buildings is also of significance. The inclusion of the well is an unusual element in a station group. This station was the terminus of the southern line from September 1878 to September 1879 while the rail bridge over the Murrumbidgee River and flood plain was finished. They are focal buildings in the small township of Bomen and indicate the former significance of the site in the development of the railway system throughout the state.

The Bomen railway station was listed on the New South Wales State Heritage Register on 2 April 1999 having satisfied the following criteria.

The place possesses uncommon, rare or endangered aspects of the cultural or natural history of New South Wales.

This item is assessed as historically rare. This item is assessed as scientifically rare. This item is assessed as arch. rare. This item is assessed as socially rare.

== See also ==
- List of railway stations in New South Wales
