= Bomen, New South Wales =

Bomen Wagga Wagga, New South Wales
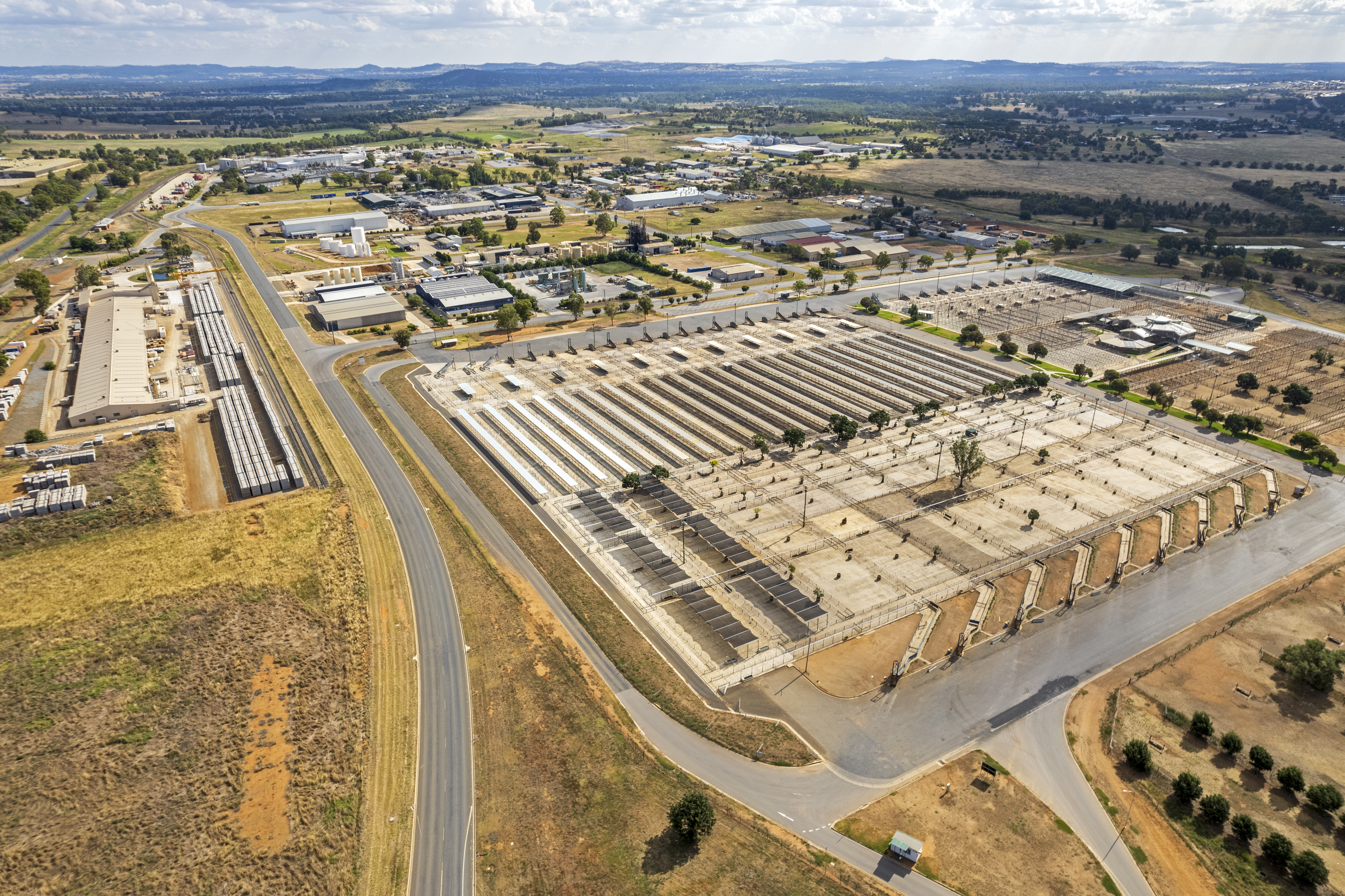
- Aerial view of Bomen in December 2021

- Coordinates: 35°04.5′S 147°25′E
- Population: 40 (SAL 2021)
- LGA(s): City of Wagga Wagga
- County: Clarendon
- Parish: North Wagga Wagga
- State electorate(s): Wagga Wagga
- Federal division(s): Riverina
Suburbs around Bomen:
Cartwrights Hill	Bomen	Eunanoreenya
North Wagga Wagga	Gumly Gumly	Eunanoreenya

Bomen is a northern suburb of Wagga Wagga in southern New South Wales, Australia. The suburb is dominated by industrial enterprises including Cargill Beef, Watties, the Wagga Wagga Livestock Marketing Centre (saleyards). The suburb is also home to Wagga Wagga's secondary (and original) railway station on the Main Southern line, when the line waited for the construction of a bridge over the Murrumbidgee River. New streets in Bomen are to be named after sheep and cattle breeds.

== Heritage listings ==
Bomen has a number of heritage-listed sites, including:

- Main Southern railway: Bomen railway station

== Industry ==
Major industries located within Bomen are located within the Bomen Business Park which include Cargill Foods Australia, Heinz-Watties factory, BOC Gas plant and Austrak concrete sleeper plant. Bomen is the site of the proposed Riverina Intermodal Freight & Logistics Hub.
