= The Gap, New South Wales =

The Gap New South Wales
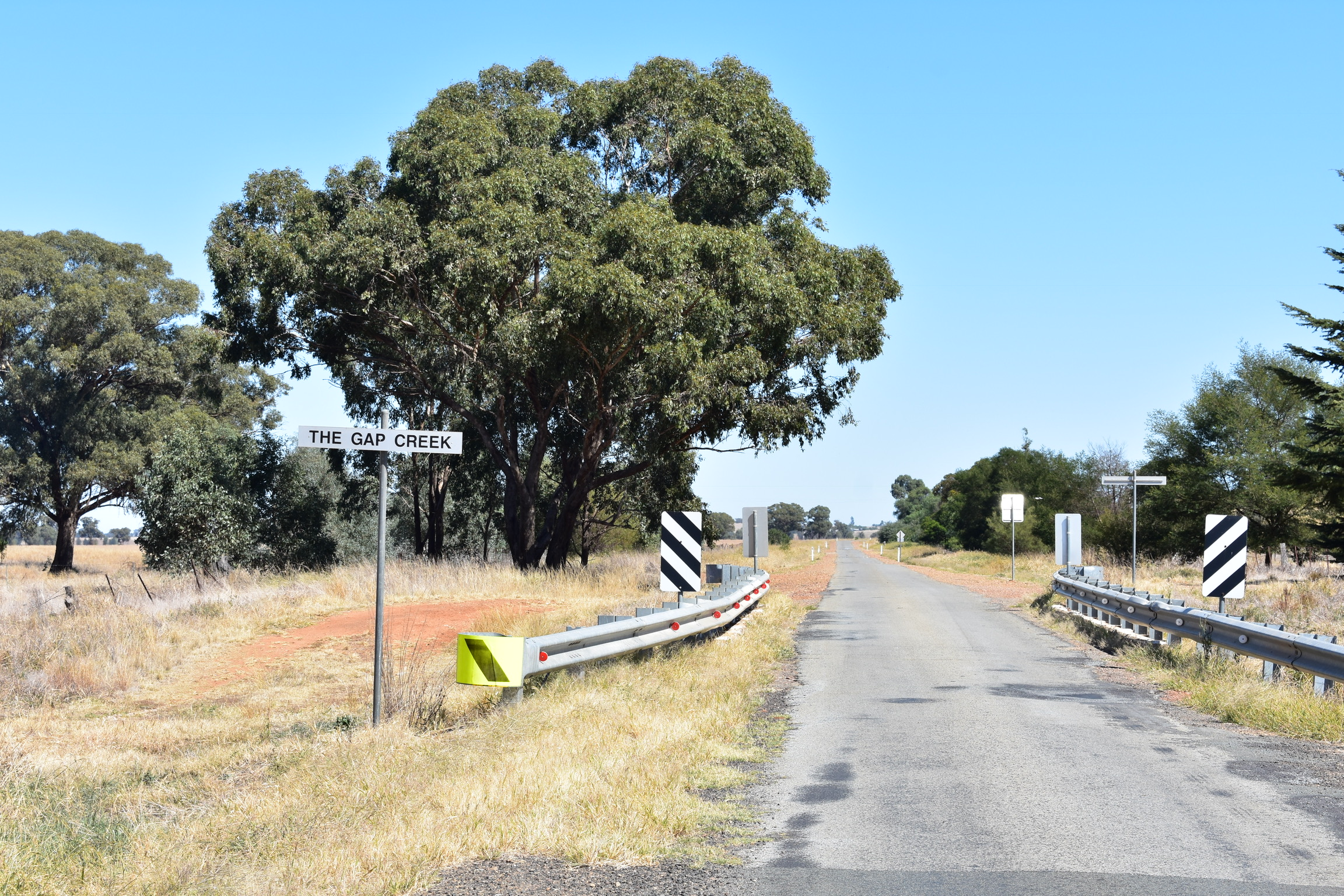
- The Gap Creek crossing on The Gap Road

- Coordinates: 34°59′55″S 147°16′04″E
- Population: 62 (2016 census)
- Postcode(s): 2650
- LGA(s): City of Wagga Wagga
- County: Clarendon
- State electorate(s): Wagga Wagga

The Gap is a farming community in the central east part of the Riverina close to Wagga Wagga.
