= North Wagga Wagga =

- Suburb
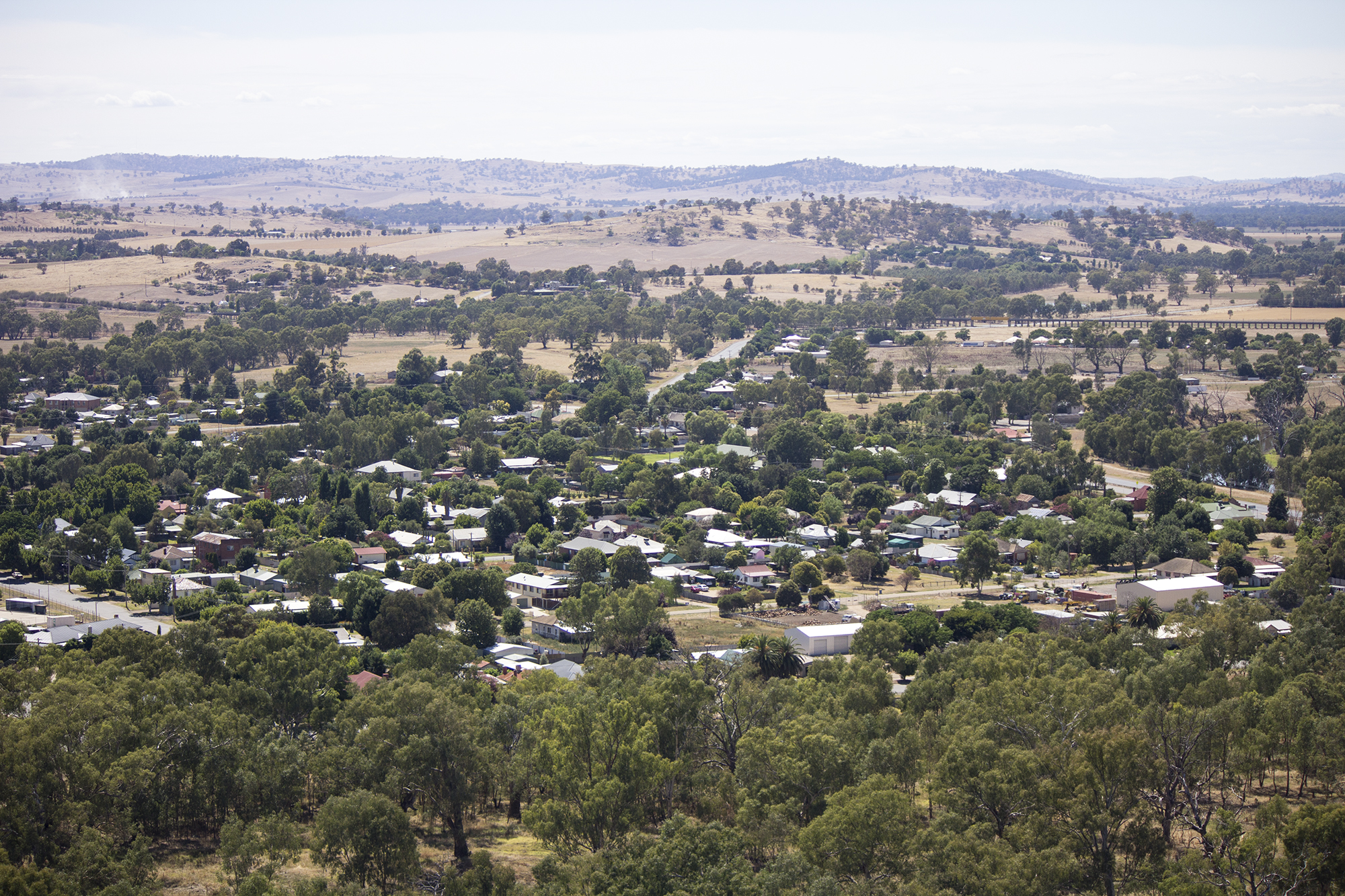
- Aerial view of North Wagga

- Interactive map of North Wagga Wagga
- Coordinates: 35°5′44.48″S 147°22′40.01″E
- Country: Australia
- State: New South Wales
- City: Wagga Wagga
- LGA: City of Wagga Wagga

Government
  - State electorate: Wagga Wagga
  - Federal division: Riverina

Population
  - Total: 679 (SAL 2021)
- Postcode: 2650
- County: Clarendon
- Parish: North Wagga Wagga
Suburbs around North Wagga Wagga
Estella	Cartwrights Hill	Bomen
	North Wagga Wagga	Eunanoreenya
Wagga Wagga	Wagga Wagga

North Wagga Wagga (informally called North Wagga) is an inner northern suburb of Wagga Wagga, New South Wales, Australia, located on the floodplain of the Murrumbidgee River, directly across from the city's Central Business District. North Wagga is one of Wagga's oldest suburbs, being settled at approximately the same time as Wagga. Two pubs are located within North Wagga - The Black Swan Hotel and the Palm and Pawn Hotel, as well as a public school, a public hall, a football/cricket ground and a scattering of business and churches.

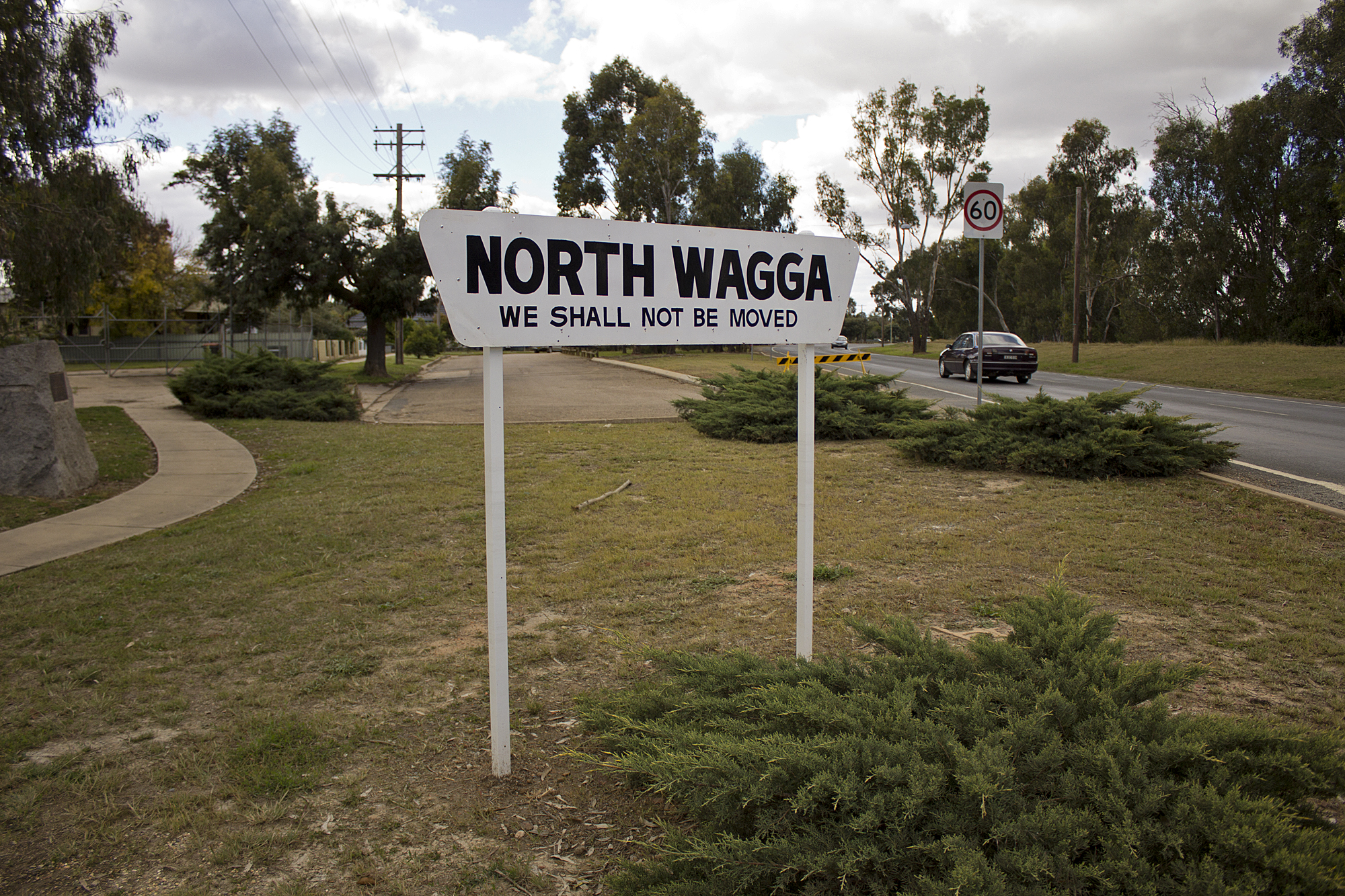
North Wagga "We Shall Not Be Moved" sign

Due to its flood prone nature, Wagga Wagga City Council long sought to deter development in North Wagga and aimed for its residents to relocate. For many years the level of services provided in North Wagga was inferior to the rest of Wagga, and most alterations and additions to dwellings were prohibited. In 1960, a levee bank was built around Wagga to protect it from flood inundation, however, North Wagga was not included in this protection. It was during this time that North Wagga's slogan "We Shall Not Be Moved" first appeared.

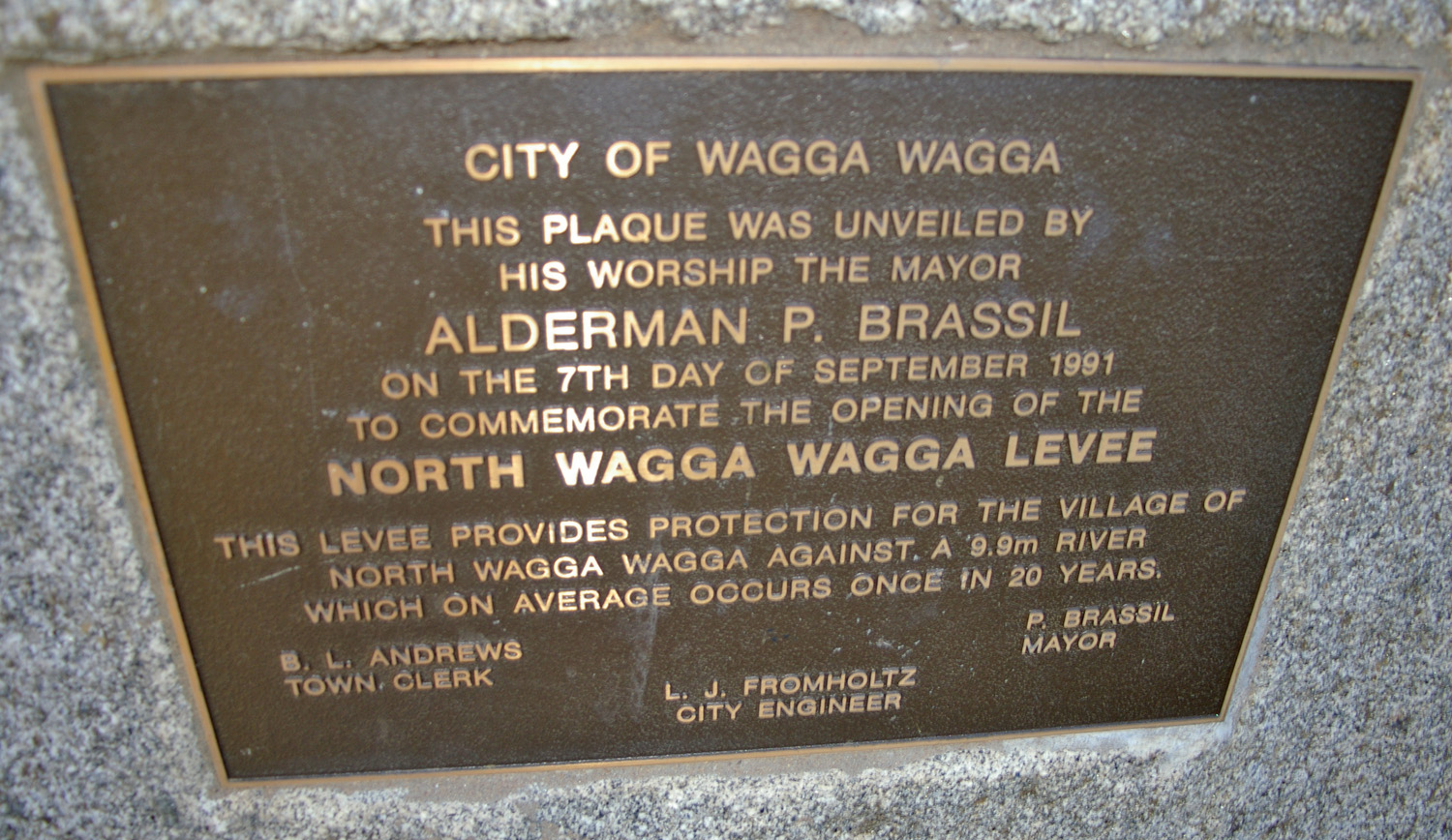
North Wagga Levee plaque

It was not until the late 1970s that the Council relented on its restrictions on development and built a levee around the suburb, however to this day it is lower than the main city levee and only affords protection to flood events up to 9.9 metres (32 ft), approximately 5.8% Annual Exceedance Probability (AEP) or 1 in 17 year Average Recurrence Interval (ARI) flood level event.

In March 2012, the suburb was inundated after the levee was over-topped after the Murrumbidgee River reached 10.56 metres (34.6 ft), 0.18 metres (0.59 ft) below the 1974 flood, after record rainfall fell over a large area of the Riverina and the Murrumbidgee River catchment.
