= Harefield, New South Wales =

Harefield New South Wales
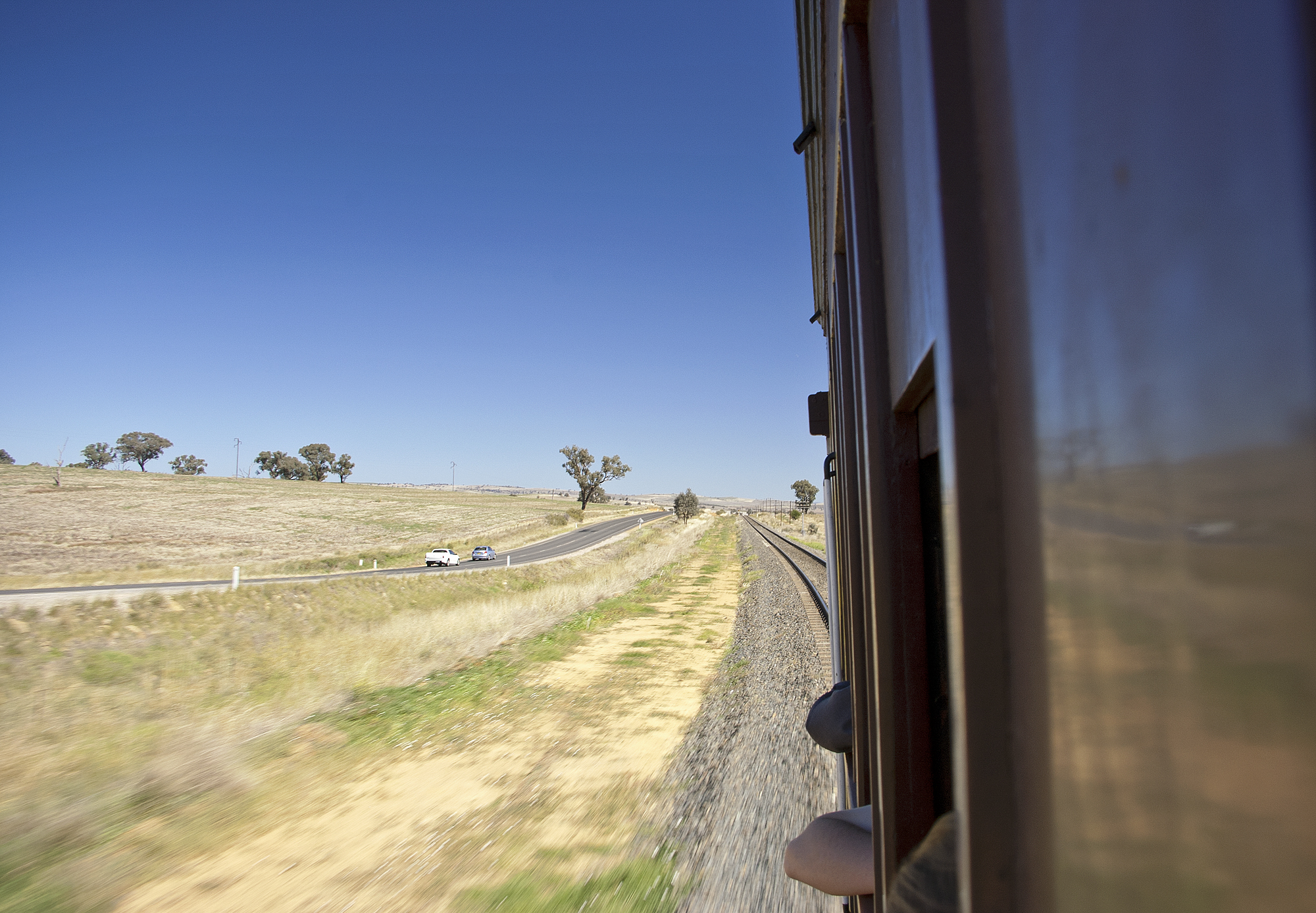
- Junee-Harefield Road at Harefield viewed from a CPH railmotor on the Main southern railway line

- Coordinates: 34°58′11″S 147°33′59″E
- Population: 165 (SAL 2021)
- Postcode(s): 2650
- Elevation: 282 m (925 ft)
- Location: 35 km (22 mi) from Wagga Wagga; 11 km (7 mi) from Junee
- LGA(s): Junee Shire
- County: Clarendon
- State electorate(s): Cootamundra
- Federal division(s): Riverina

Harefield is a locality in New South Wales, Australia. It in the central east part of the Riverina and situated about 11 kilometres south of Junee and 35 kilometres north by road from Wagga Wagga.

Gerilgambeth Post Office opened on 1 September 1879, was renamed Wallaceton in 1880, Harefield in 1882 and closed in 1980.

== Freight terminal ==
A new freight container terminal began operating at Harefield during 2012. It is planned that up to 160 12-metre (40 foot) containers will be located at Harefield at any one time, with larger trains capable of hauling 104 containers planned for the site.
