= Charles Gabriel =

Charles Gabriel may refer to:

- Charles A. Gabriel (1928–2003), Chief of Staff of the United States Air Force
- Charles H. Gabriel (1856–1932), American writer of gospel songs and composer of gospel tunes
- Charles John Gabriel (1879–1963), Australian conchologist
- Charles Louis Gabriel (1857–1927), Australian photographer and medical practitioner
