= Gundagai lore =

Aboriginal heritage of Gundagai

Gundagai lore is associated with Gundagai, Australia, a place of considerable reputed Aboriginal cultural significance, with both archaeological sites and anthropological associations related to sacred and spiritual beliefs of the local clan group and wider cultural associations.

The Gundagai area is part of the traditional lands of the Wiradjuri speaking people before and post European settlement, and also holds national significance to Indigenous Australians. The floodplains of the Murrumbidgee below the present town of Gundagai were a frequent meeting place of Wiradjuri speaking people from nearby regions. One indication of the ancient, sacred cultural landscape that is North Gundagai is the bora ring that has been identified close to town.

The location of Gundagai on a sizeable prehistoric highway, (the Murrumbidgee River), along with the significant and sacred Aboriginal ceremonial ground across all of North Gundagai, and other ancient archaeology, indicates it would have been an important ceremonial, mining, manufacturing and trading place for Aboriginal people before the arrival of the Europeans. As with all ancient sacred places, particularly within still continuing Australian Aboriginal culture, the sacredness of Gundagai's amazing Australian Aboriginal cultural landscape continues despite colonial and later intrusion.

Gundagai Aboriginal elders, Jimmy Clements and John Noble, attended the 1927 opening of the new Federal Parliament House in Canberra by the then-Duke of York. Jimmy Clements also known as King Billy whose traditional name was 'Yangar', walked forward to respectfully salute the Duke and Duchess of York, and after that the two elders were formally presented to the royal couple as prominent citizens of Australia.

== Australian dialogue meeting ==
Aboriginal leaders Pat Dodson and Noel Pearson; the former Chief of the Australian Army and Governor of Western Australia, Lieutenant General John Sanderson; and current Australian business leaders, met at a remote property on the Murrumbidgee River near Gundagai in September 2008 on the first stages of an Australian Dialogue to promote constitutional reform and structural change for Indigenous Australian people. Galarrwuy Yunupingu, Northern Territory Indigenous leader, could not be at the gathering of esteemed senior Australians but was kept informed of the progress of talks.

== Natural phenomena ==
A feeling of awe and reverence for that Almighty power that formed the universe was had in Gundagai at the appearance of the comet on Saturday 21 December 1844. In 1859 the 'Aurora Australis' interfered with the operation of the Gundagai electric telegraph. So great can be some rainfall downpours at Gundagai that old mining dams have been known to fill and burst. A meteor seen at Gundagai on New Year's Day, 1876 was reported to have lit up the streets as though with magnesium wire, and over four inches of rain fell in two hours during a dreadful storm at Gundagai in 1885. Very deep snowfalls and severe weather were experienced in 1899.

Similar to other inland areas in Australia, the Gundagai area has often been visited by tornadoes, particularly in dry times. There has also been numerous reports of earth tremors rattling through Gundagai since European settlement.

=== Struck by lightning ===
During a thunderstorm near Gundagai in 1876, an electric fire-ball was seen to issue from the clouds, strike the earth, and explode with a loud noise, singeing Constable Macalister's hair and whiskers, and leaving a blue mark on his side. A terrific thunderstorm at Gundagai in March 1877 set fire to the inside of Armour's house. In November 1899, a man named Caigan was struck by lightning and killed as he sheltered in a hollow log. A boy, Patrick Vaughan, was struck by lightning in October 1904 and rendered unconscious for a long time. Two horses were struck by lightning in 1904 and one horse died. A few weeks later two boys were struck by lightning as they hid under a bullock hide strung over a wire fence. The electric charge travelled along the fence wire. In 1938 two dead drovers were found under a tree south of Gundagai, again the victims of lightning. Lightning killed a horse in 1946 but the rider escaped with her life though somewhat injured. A bushfire that caused a lot of damage was started near Gundagai in February 1906 after lightning hit a tree. John Bloomquist, who was camped in a hollow tree on the Gundagai Golf links, was horribly burned and died when the tree was struck by lightning in 1932. There has been other victims of lightning in the Gundagai area due to the ferocity of thunderstorms that can happen locally.

== Etymology and dindsenchas ==
Some believe the name 'Gundagai' derives from the word 'Gundagair', an 1838 pastoral run in the name of William Hutchinson to the immediate north of current day Gundagai. 'Gair' was recorded at Yass in 1836 by George Bennett (naturalist) and means 'bird', as in budgerigar or good bird. In that context 'Gundagai' means place of birds but that placename may refer to the area to the north of Gundagai not to Gundagai town. The word 'Gundagai' is also said to mean cut with a hand-axe behind the knee. Combining the two meanings results in the place of birds near where there is a large bend in the Murrumbidgee River that was caused by a cut in the back of the knee. This meaning presupposes that for there to be a knee there is a leg and a body which there is.

There is a large anthropomorphic figure in the landscape at Gundagai. The figure has a kangaroo or dog-like head and is several kilometres in length. It has hindquarters similar to that of an emu but with a long tail and it appears to be sitting on a bend in the river that has a box shape. The image faces to the west and its head is near the Dog on the Tuckerbox area at Gundagai. This primary landscape figure marked out by the course of the Murrumbidgee River at Gundagai, is replicated in some Sydney Rock Engravings and recorded in local Aboriginal cultural heritage. The 'Gundagai' placename meaning further refers to the reason for the bend in the Murrumbidgee River near the Gundagai showground at Gundagai and to the mythological landscape epic at Gundagai. Bunyips, understood to be where streams flood out of their usual channel in wet seasons flooding surrounding land but also drowning anyone caught on the wrong side of them, are recorded on the Gundagai floodplain; opposite 'Kimo'; and at the junction of the Tumut and Murrumbidgee rivers. The Kimo bunyip is accompanied by a large slash in the earth's mantle out of which the 'Jindalee Volcanics' extruded.

The area is also identified as Jones Creek diorite. 'Kimo' is 'Mt Kimo', named for one of the Nereids, (Nereids, Cymatolege or 'Kymo'), that occupies the midpoint of the 'Kimo Range', facing Gundagai High School. 'Kimo' is also known as Nargun. Charles Sturt in Chapter Two of his Murrumbidgee exploration journal, likened the 'verdant' Gundagai valley as having Diana of Nemi site parallels as recorded in James George Frazer's 'The Golden Bough', when Sturt journeyed through the Gundagai area in 1829–1830. Mount Minerva is the old name for what today is the hill known as 'Minjary'.

Oak groves and muses featured in some succeeding cultural depictions of Gundagai no doubt assigned by early settlers who had received the benefits of an education in the classics, such as Charles Tompson, claimed to be Australia's first published native-born poet and whose father had possession of a large tract of land at Gundagai in the 1830s; and James Macarthur son of John Macarthur, Australian wool pioneer, who met up with Johann Wolfgang von Goethe in Europe and who with his brother William Macarthur had possession of Nangus Station at Nangus, Gundagai. Goethe was one of the key figures of Classicism in the late 18th and early 19th centuries. One pastoral holding on the western side of North Gundagai was named 'Jarno'. Jarno is a character in Goethe's, Wilhelm Meister's Apprenticeship, a German response to the dramas of William Shakespeare.

Gundagai also has a 'Shakespeare Terrace' that runs along the Murrumbidgee floodplain below the town that may or may not refer to the amazing grand theatre corroborees that happened in that area, eagerly shared in the 1830s for the benefit of overlanders and travellers; or in reference to several or all works of Shakespeare. Placenames such as that of Virgil Street that ascends Gundagai's Mount Parnassus lead to sites in the local landscape that for example invoke Virgil's 'Aeneid', viz ... there the fearsome cavern of the awesome Sybil lies, Whence came her prophecies. The name 'Warramore', is given for Stuckey's Station in 1836 at today's Gundagai. 'Warramore' is linked to 'Warrawen', which is the large cut in the western side of the Monaro Plateau from near which western travelling geological fault lines begin, and 'Warragong', which is the section of the beginning of the Australian Alps in the Gundagai region upon which snow sometimes falls. The junction of the Murrumbidgee and Tumut Rivers is named 'Bewuck' to note the numerous Murray cod found in that area.

George Augustus Robinson, Chief Protector of Aborigines in Port Phillip, commented that Gundagai was remarkable for its nomenclature when passing through the town in 1844.

As Gundagai is a place of significant Irish, Scottish and English settlement post the arrival of the Europeans, Celtic and English landscape understanding or dindsenchas is also evident at Gundagai. The story of the 'Ghost of Kimo Hill', (in 'Gundagai Ghosts' below), is one example of this. Gundagai Shire Council also had a ward system of Municipal Governance until recent times. but is now composed of eight councillors elected proportionally. 'West Ward' at Gundagai is still delineated by West Street. The ward system originates from Scotland and Eastern England where wards, that are watchful spirits that protect settlements from internal troubles and external dangers, ... form nightly a ring of benevolent spiritual protection against harmful spirits. Once the spirits are driven from the landscape, the protection is no longer forthcoming and the settlement is open to psychic ills. Beating the Bounds, the religious form of wards, is still practised in some parishes in the Anglican Diocese of Canberra and Goulburn. Cursed is he who transgresseth the bounds or doles of his neighbour. Gundagai's Anglican parish still has 'wardens'.

The Right Reverend Trevor Edwards Vicar General of the Anglican Church and Assistant Bishop of the Diocese of Canberra and Goulburn, commented in September 2011, on the stories held within the walls of St John's Church Gundagai when he led the commemoration of the laying of the foundation stone of that church in 1861 Outside the walls of the St John's church at Gundagai are also the stories of multiple events and aspects of culture not the least the two oak trees outside the Anglican Rectory.

Gundagai's history includes song, verse, and events. These began with Australian Aboriginal cultural heritage and continued with the arrival of Europeans. These elements are present in placenames and the landscape.

=== Bunyips ===
The Murrumbidgee River at Gundagai has been a place of numerous bunyip sightings.

=== Snake Tales ===
Snakes do unusual things at Gundagai such as the eastern brown snake that removed itself from the stomach of a red-bellied black snake after the red-belly black had eaten it. George Bennett, English born Australian physician and naturalist, recorded at Gundagai in the 1830s that the black snake was the wife of the brown so that may have meant in the biblical sense. In 1908 there was a snake plague at Gundagai with several crawling around the main street and one entering the barber's shop. In 1924 an eastern brown snake that had hidden under a home, was enticed out after 'Yes, We have No Bananas', 'The Road to Gundagai' and finally 'Come into the Garden Maud', were played on the harmonica. A man was bitten on the finger by a snake in 1929 but couldn't get the snake to let go. His dog eventually dragged the snake away. The man chopped his finger off and survived. Also in 1929, Hubert Opperman famous cyclist, had a tiger snake encounter at Gundagai.

The efforts of Yarri, Jacky Jacky, and two other Indigenous men Jackie Douglas and Tommy Davis in saving many Gundagai people from the 1852 floodwaters were heroic. Between them, these men rescued more than 40 people using bark canoes. Yarri and Jacky Jacky were honoured with bronze medallions for their efforts, and were allowed to demand sixpences from all Gundagai residents, although Yarri was maltreated on at least one occasion after the flood. It is claimed that the Gundagai community developed a special affinity with the Wiradjuri people and that the flood and its aftermath was the birthplace of reconciliation.

=== Spirit Dog, Djirri Djirris, Killimicat Craypton and Ghosts ===
To the east of Gundagai, local Aboriginal cultural tradition traditionally ran downstream into the Murrumbidgee, then on to Gundagai rather than upstream to Tumut. As well as bunyip stories, Brungle Aboriginal women relate the story of the 'Mirriyolla Dog' a spirit dog that could shapeshift. Willie wagtails or djirri djirris were known to listen into conversations so it was wise to not repeat confidences. A man with no head called 'Craypton' lived up on 'Killimicat' and would ride down the mountain of a night on a horse. The blue glow of the Min Min light sometimes identified as a fata morgana phenomenon, is also known in the Gundagai area and Aboriginal people were taught to run if they saw it. The Mirriyolla Ghost Dog is also known of in Cootamundra a few miles to the north-west of Gundagai and lives in the Bethungra Range that is partly in Gundagai Shire. This ghost dog hunts on just one night a year, the longest night.

Gundagai has recorded several ghost and will-o'-the-wisp sightings. Will-O'-the-Wisp is Will the Smith. Will is a wicked blacksmith who is given a second chance by Saint Peter at the gates to Heaven, but leads such a bad life that he ends up being doomed to wander the Earth. The Devil provides him with a single burning coal with which to warm himself, which he then used to lure foolish travellers into the marshes. One tall and shadowy ... supernatural visitant that appeared from under a culvert in Gundagai in 1869, severely alarmed a horse and its rider, and exhibited a livid, phosphoric light such as a rotting fish might display.

Mrs Moroney at Jones Creek, Gundagai, was often visited by a ghost in 1873. The ghost wore a grey tweed suit and had a red beard. Sometimes one-half of him would appear to those he chose to favour with his presence, and at other times, the other half was seen. Mrs Moroney spoke to her clergyman and also the Bishop and then vacated her residence. A nearby resident, Mr Carey, then began to receive visits by the same spectre. Mr Carey corroborated Mrs Moroney's description of the ghost and dealt with it by hitting it on the head with a shovel the next time it paid him a visit. The shovel bounced off so next Mr Carey set the dogs on it and the ghost retreated through the doorway.

Co-founder of the Gundagai Museum, Oscar Bell, British Empire Medal recipient for services to the community including preserving and recording Gundagai history, and President of the Gundagai and District Historical Society, told of the ghost of a little old woman that alarmed a newly arrived in Australia, Irish pastoral worker named Dennis Kilker. A ghost of the same description, (which may have been a Cailleach, or Washer at the Ford also known as a Bean Nighe, given the Celtic mythological elements in the story), was also reported by a tourist named Ryan who passed through the area in the 1960s. Bell then went on to remember the ghost of Kimo Hill, a couple of miles to the south of Gundagai, that is thought to belong to a lost or stolen child who went missing in the area, in the 1830s. 'Kimo Hill' is a child hill of the 'Kimo Range' that has become distanced from its mother hill, 'Mount Kimo', on the northern end of the Sheahan Bridge at North Gundagai.

A young lady, Bridget Moran drowned herself in Morley's Creek near the old Gundagai Flour Mill, in 1887 and ever since, some people when walking past the mill report seeing the image of a sad young woman looking out from the upper windows of the building. More recently a Gundagai resident saw a ghost at the old Gundagai Gaol and wrote a song about her.

In 1923, a Ghost Ball was held in the Gundagai hall with dancers clad in white costume. Gundagai also has a long and strong oral tradition of folklore particular to place that in no small way is due to the site of Gundagai and its many thousands of years long occupation by Australian Aboriginal people being the original foundation population that holds continuing traditional custodianship of place. In turn, as a direct result of colonialism by England from the 1800s onward, the current culturally diverse Celtic and Anglo-Saxon origin dominant in numbers population evolved at Gundagai at high cost to the original inhabitants.

== See also ==
- Dog on the Tuckerbox
