= Gundagai railway station =

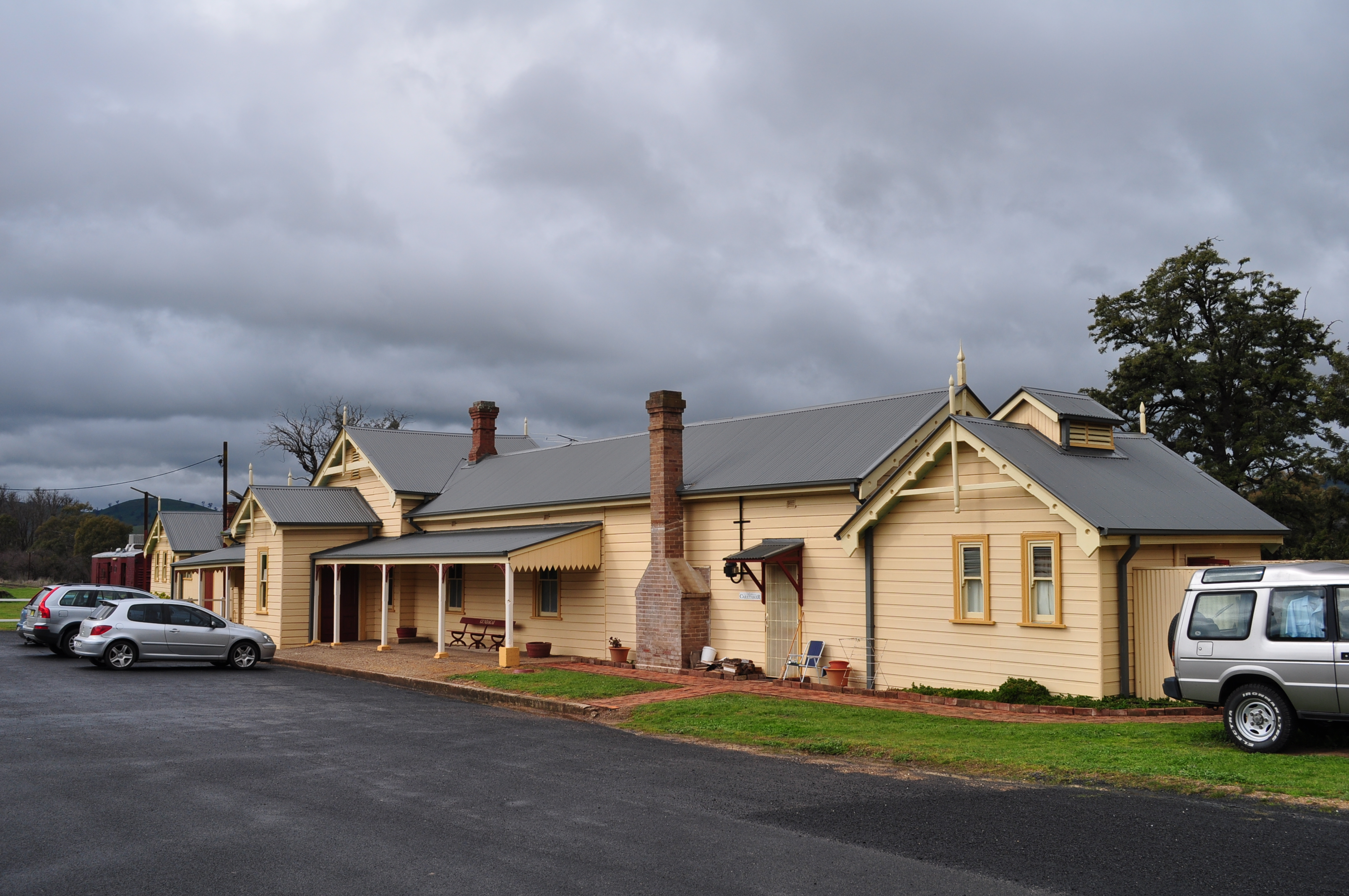

- Location within New South Wales Location within Australia
- 35.065506°S 148.112828°E
- Location: Cootamundra-Tumut railway, Gundagai, Cootamundra-Gundagai Regional Council, New South Wales, Australia

Site notes
- Architect: John Whitton
- Owner: Transport Asset Manager of New South Wales

New South Wales Heritage Register
- Official name: Gundagai Railway Station and yard group
- Type: state heritage (complex / group)
- Designated: 2 April 1999
- Reference no.: 1159
- Type: Railway Platform/Station
- Category: Transport – Rail

Gundagai railway station is a heritage-listed disused railway station on the closed Tumut railway line at Gundagai, New South Wales, Australia. It was designed by John Whitton. The property was added to the New South Wales State Heritage Register on 2 April 1999.

== History ==
Following 20 years of community and political representation the station was officially opened on 21 July 1886. It was designed by John Whitton, the Engineer-in-Chief of the New South Wales Government Railways. In 1903 the branch line was extended to Tumut, following the completion of the railway bridge across the Murrumbidgee River flood plain.

The precinct environment is probably unique in railway terms in that it is sited on the side of a hill formation above a flood plain and the rail track access and the goods yard have been built by rock excavation into the hillside. This has resulted in a somewhat restricted site compared to the normal railway yard, particularly in view of the original intention for this station to be the terminus for the line.

In 1926 the western linked part was rebuilt to provide facilities for the Refreshment Room. In 1927 alterations to provide ladies waiting room.

For 98 years it was the hub of Gundagai's existence carrying freight, passengers and mail to and from the cities of Sydney and Melbourne.

Following damaging floods in 1984 the branch line was closed and in 1989 the State Rail Authority abandoned the building. In 1994 Gundagai Historic Bridges Inc. was granted a 25-year lease of the disused and vandalised station and precincts.

The station complex was significantly refurbished in the 1990s.

== Description ==
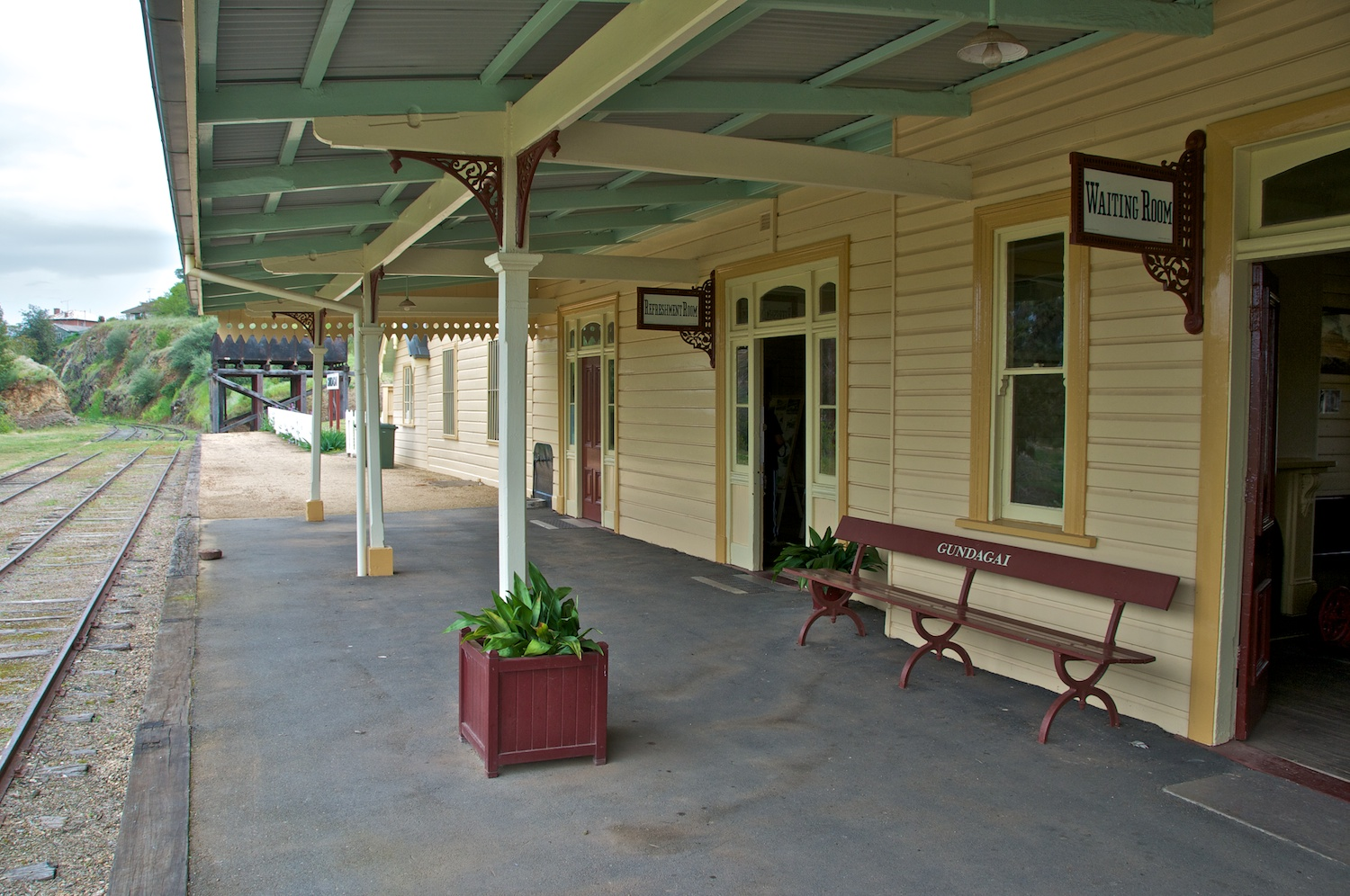
Platform

The main passenger station building is a large timber framed and weatherboard clad single storey structure with verandahs to each main elevation and brick chimneys. It is a type 4 standard roadside station design, and dates from 1886.

The former signal box is a small timber framed and weatherboard clad building with a skillion roof constructed to house the track signalling control equipment, including an interlocking machine. It is situated on the platform.

The goods shed is a standard side platform-type timber framed corrugated iron goods shed with iron bracketed roof eaves. It is of a sub type 3 design, and its dimensions are 72' x 22'. Its gabled roof is slated (not iron) and is very unusual in New South Wales. It stands on a brick base with timber platforms and extended line platforms leading to the pillar crane.

The crane is a T151 5 tonne jib crane.

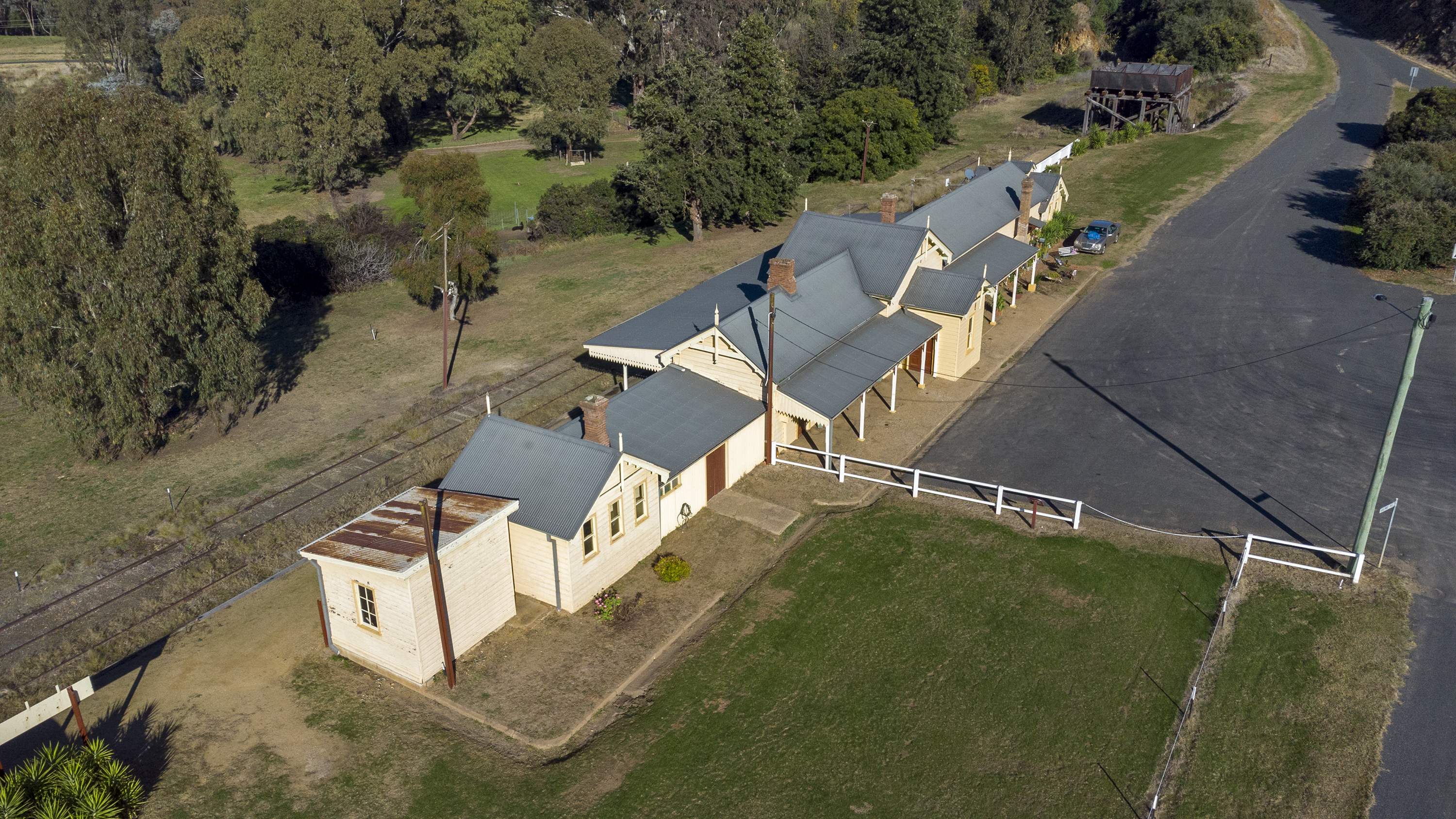
Aerial view of the station in May 2021

All buildings were reported to be in good condition as at 27 November 2000, except for part of goods shed in fair to poor condition.

== Heritage listing ==
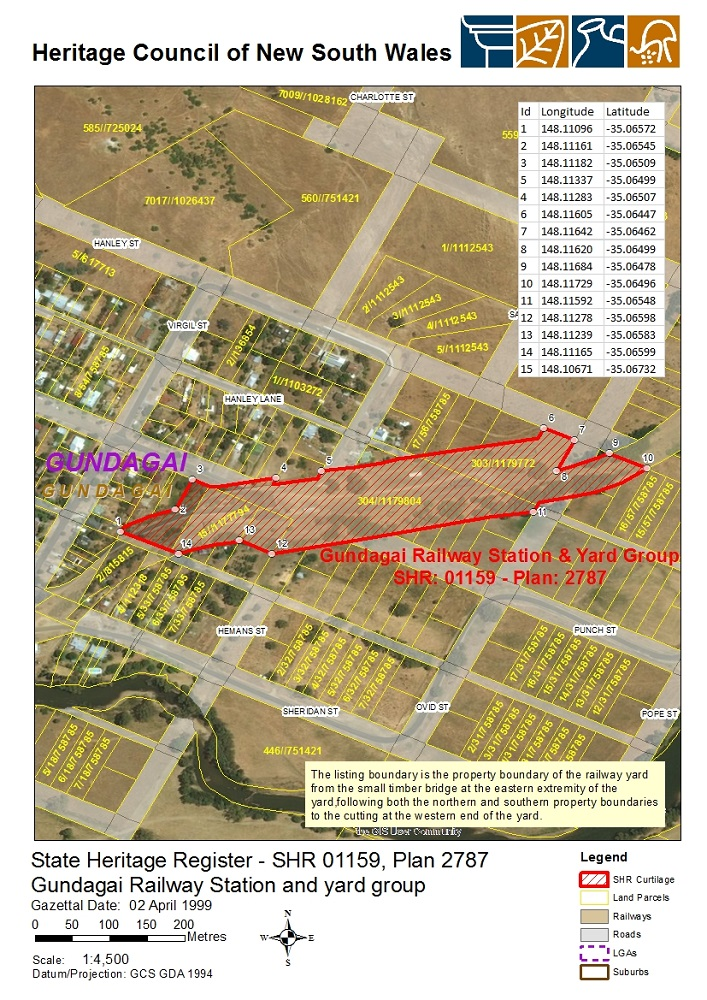
Heritage boundaries

Gundagai is a highly significant site being the first crossing of the Murrumbidgee River by the Hume Highway. There is an excellent group of railway buildings and items here from the late 1880s. In particular the relationship of the station, yard and timber road and rail viaducts makes the site of particular significance. The quality of the buildings also reflects the importance of the location at the time of the railway opening. The completeness of the site and its picturesque setting overlooking the valley add to the quality of the site and display how the railway was integrated into the existing environment and townscape. The railway station although removed from the centre of the town is an important civic element in the townscape.

Gundagai railway station was listed on the New South Wales State Heritage Register on 2 April 1999 having satisfied the following criteria.

The place is important in demonstrating the course, or pattern, of cultural or natural history in New South Wales.

The station building and goods shed are unique in New South Wales. Reflects the extent of political involvement in railway management by the erection of elaborate facilities on a branch line. It became the hub of social life in Gundagai and has strong links with town development.

The place is important in demonstrating aesthetic characteristics and/or a high degree of creative or technical achievement in New South Wales.

The railway precinct environment is uniquely sited on the side of a hill formation above a flood plain. The railway track and goods yard have been built by rock excavation into the hillside. The station overlooks the Murrumbidgee Valley and is itself overlooked by the town.

The place has a strong or special association with a particular community or cultural group in New South Wales for social, cultural or spiritual reasons.

It is significant to the people and trade that travelled to and from Gundagai using the rail system. When it is restored it will once again have social impact through community.

The place has potential to yield information that will contribute to an understanding of the cultural or natural history of New South Wales.

It is the longest timber platform building in the state. The Signal Box has one of the oldest mechanical interlocking frames in the state.

The place possesses uncommon, rare or endangered aspects of the cultural or natural history of New South Wales.

This item is assessed as historically rare. This item is assessed as scientifically rare. This item is assessed as arch. rare. This item is assessed as socially rare.

The place is important in demonstrating the principal characteristics of a class of cultural or natural places/environments in New South Wales.

For its social significance.

== See also ==
The Gundagai Visitor Information Centre has launched a self-guided audio tour of the railway station.
