= Murrumbidgee River railway bridge =

Murrumbidgee River railway bridge may refer to one of three bridges crossing the Murrumbidgee River in New South Wales, Australia:

- Murrumbidgee River railway bridge, Gundagai, crossing the Murrumbidgee River in Gundagai
- Murrumbidgee River railway bridge, Narrandera, crossing the Murrumbidgee River in Narrandera Shire
- Murrumbidgee River railway bridge, Wagga Wagga, crossing the Murrumbidgee River in Wagga Wagga
