= Bila Yarrudhanggalangdhuray =

Australian historical novel by Anita Heiss

- First edition
- Author: Anita Heiss
- Language: English
- Genre: Historical fiction
- Published: 2021 (Simon & Schuster)
- Publication place: Australia
- Media type: Print (paperback)
- Pages: 393
- ISBN: 9781760850449
- OCLC: 1236159774

Bila Yarrudhanggalangdhuray is a 2021 historical novel by Anita Heiss. Set around the time of Gundagai's flood of 1852, it concerns the life of a young Wiradjuri woman, Wagadhaany, the daughter of Yarri, and her relationships with her colonial masters, and her people who live near Murrumbidya.

== Reception ==
A review in Australian Book Review of Bila Yarrudhanggalangdhuray wrote "With its strong emotional pull and its accessible female hero, this novel deserves wide appeal.". A reviewer for Guardian Australia called it "a novel of the myopia and cruelty of “good” intentions." and "a joyful love story, and a literary celebration of the Wiradyuri language, which is woven throughout."

Bila Yarrudhanggalangdhuray has also been reviewed by The Sydney Morning Herald, The West Australian, Books+Publishing, The Canberra Times, LSJ, and The Saturday Paper.
