= Gundagai =

- Town
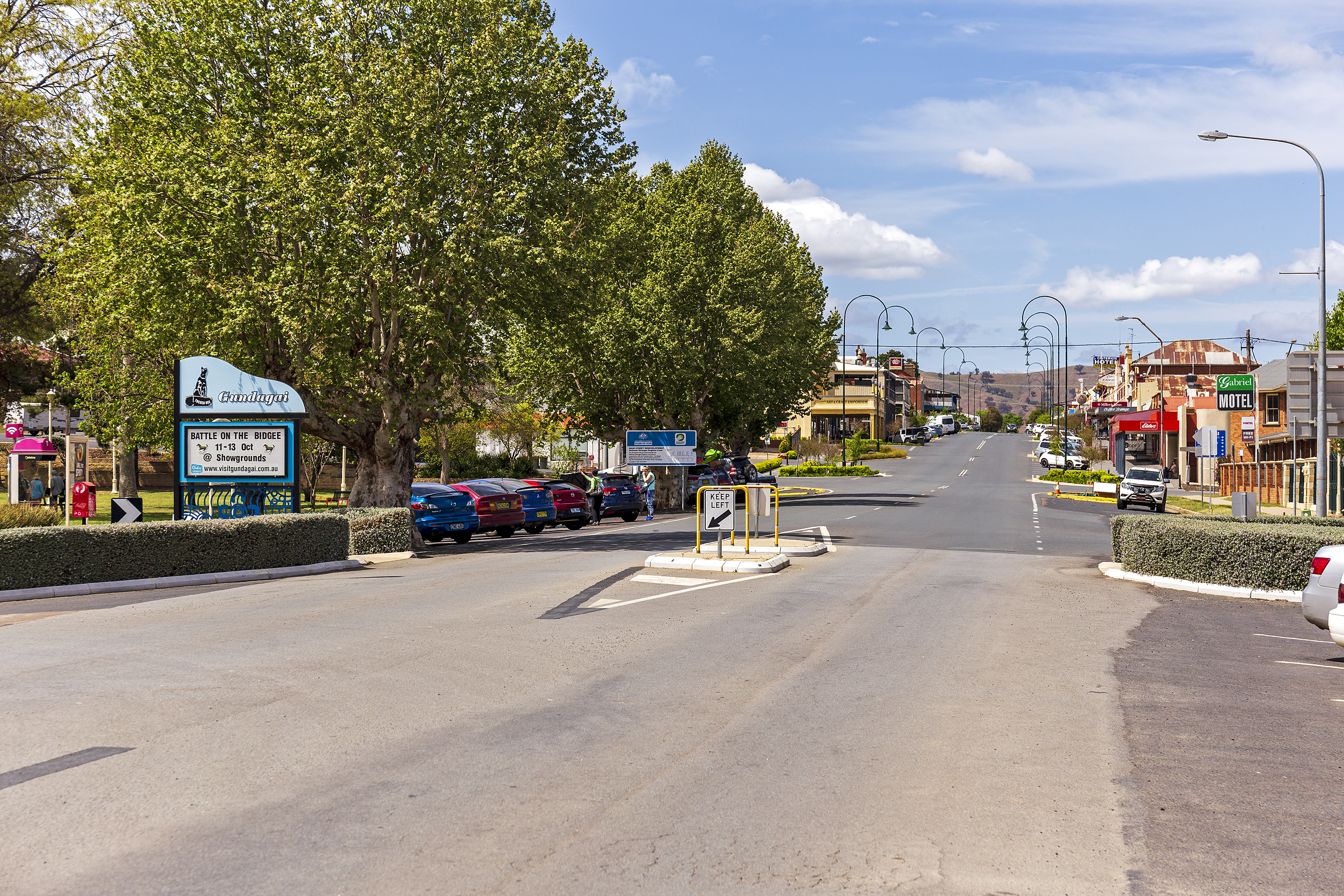
- Sheridan Street in 2019

- Interactive map of Gundagai
- Coordinates: 35°03′57″S 148°06′28″E
- Country: Australia
- State: New South Wales
- LGA: Cootamundra-Gundagai Regional Council
- Location: 390 km (240 mi) WSW of Sydney; 160 km (99 mi) WNW of Canberra; 80 km (50 mi) E of Wagga Wagga; 179 km (111 mi) NE of Albury; 504 km (313 mi) NE of Melbourne
- Established: 1838

Government
  - State electorate: Cootamundra
  - Federal division: Riverina
- Elevation: 232 m (761 ft)

Population
  - Total: 2,057 (2021 census)
- Postcode: 2722
- County: Clarendon
- Mean max temp: 22.3 °C (72.1 °F)
- Mean min temp: 8.5 °C (47.3 °F)
- Annual rainfall: 714.4 mm (28.13 in)
Localities around Gundagai
Reno	Tucker Box	Mingay
	Gundagai
Tumblong	South Gundagai	South Gundagai

Gundagai /ˈɡʌndəɡaɪ/ is a town in the Riverina of New South Wales, Australia. Although a small town, Gundagai is a popular topic for writers and has become a representative icon of a typical Australian country town. Located along the Murrumbidgee River and Muniong, Honeysuckle, Kimo, Mooney Mooney, Murrumbidgee and Tumut mountain ranges, Gundagai is 390 kilometres (240 mi) south-west of Sydney. Until 2016, Gundagai was the administrative centre of Gundagai Shire local government area. In the 2021 census, the population of Gundagai was 1,970.

== History ==
=== Indigenous ===
The Gundagai area is part of the traditional lands of the Wiradjuri people, and there is considerable folklore in the area associated with Aboriginal cultural and spiritual beliefs. The floodplains of the Murrumbidgee, below the present town of Gundagai, were a frequent meeting place of the Wiradjuri. Their name for this place was Willeblumma meaning Possum Island (wille = possum, blumma = island) referring to the area of land enclosed by the Murrumbidgee River and Morleys Creek.

=== British explorers and colonists ===
In November 1824, Australian-born Hamilton Hume and British immigrant William Hovell passed close to the spot where Gundagai now stands, near the future site of Tumut. Hovell recorded seeing trees already marked by steel "tommyhawks".

On 25 September 2011, the Right Reverend Trevor Edwards, Vicar General of the Anglican Church and Assistant Bishop of the Diocese of Canberra and Goulburn, dressed in traditional white mid-nineteenth century garb, led the commemorative church service for the 150th anniversary of the laying of the foundation stone of St John's Anglican (formerly Church of England), Church, Gundagai. Bishop Edwards noted that following on the path of the explorers "Hume and Hovell, the first Gundagai settlers found a wonderful land on which to establish a town, which was gazetted in 1838 but until 1850, relied on ministry from Yass".

A local settler named Warby is recorded as having "followed Hume and Hovell's tracks to the junction of the Murrumbidgee and Tumut Rivers" and having taken "up a pastoral lease of 19,200 acres ... at a rent of thirty-three pounds per annum. ... He called the property 'Minghee' later called 'Mingay'."

Charles Sturt travelled through the area in 1829 at the start of his voyage in search of an inland sea, then believed to exist in outback Australia. Sturt again passed through Gundagai in 1830, on the return leg of his journey, and returned in 1838 in company with the Hawdon and Bonney overlanding parties. At the time of Sturt's 1829–1830 journey, he found several squatters in the district, all beyond the "limits of location": Henry O'Brien at Jugiong, William Warby at Mingay and the Stuckey brothers, Peter and Henry at Willie Ploma (the name of which is derived from the Wiradjuri word Willeplumma used to describe the area around what is now South Gundagai) and Tumblong. Peter Stuckey at Willie Ploma is regarded as the first British pastoralist to take up land in the true Gundagai region.

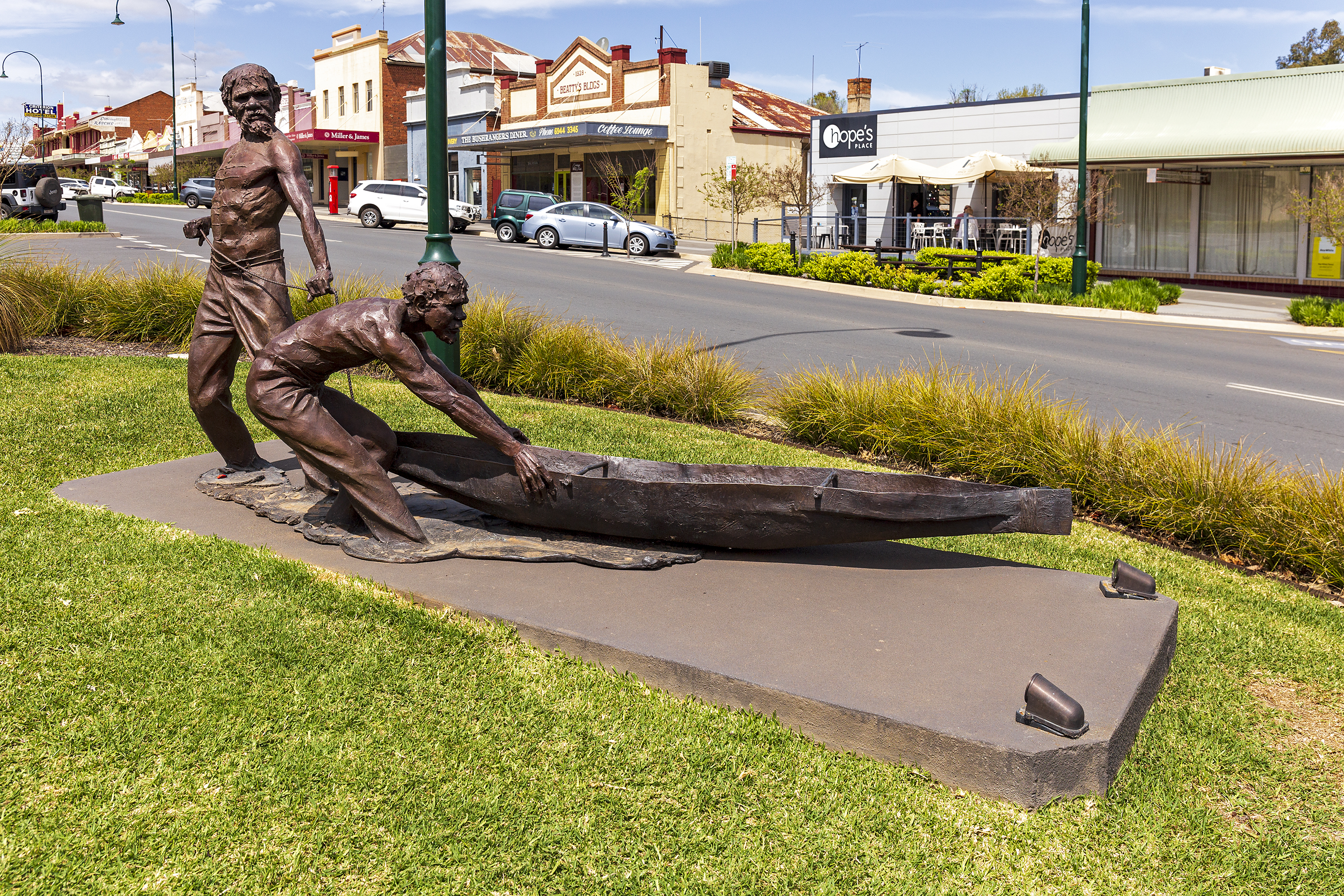
Yarri and Jacky Jacky The Great Flood of 1852 sculpture

In April 1835, William Adams Brodribb junior moved to New South Wales and became a partner in a cattle station at Maneroo. In 1836, he overlanded the second draft of cattle to Melbourne. On returning from Port Phillip, Brodribb relocated to what later became the site of Gundagai. In August, Brodribb petitioned for a punt over the Murrumbidgee river near his Gundagai hut and, in January 1838, Deputy Surveyor General Samuel Perry reported, in reference to Gundagai, that "a better site could not have been chosen for a Town of the first class".

Lady Jane Franklin, the wife of the governor of Tasmania, Sir John Franklin, travelled through Gundagai on 27 April 1839 and noted Andrews' store and public house establishment, that had a neat verandah and shuttered hut.

Edward John Eyre, Australian explorer and later Governor of Jamaica, left Sydney in late 1838 in an effort to find a practical route to overland stock to Adelaide, and then on to open communication between Adelaide and West Australia. Eyre left the Limestone Plains near today's Canberra with stock on 5 December 1838. On reaching the Murrumbidgee River at Gundagai, Eyre, accompanied by two aboriginal youths, Yarrie and Joey, "turned down the river to the westward instead of following further south" and travelled along the northern bank of the river for the better supply of water and feed available for his stock. Eyre crossed the river twice at Gundagai to "avoid some ranges".

Whilst living and working at William Warby's establishment, Caroline McAlister (wife of Thomas McAlister) gave birth to a son, John, on 21 June 1832, who may have been one of the first known children of European descent born in the Gundagai area.

The herds of John Macarthur, Throsby and Ellis, were along the Murrumbidgee by late 1831.

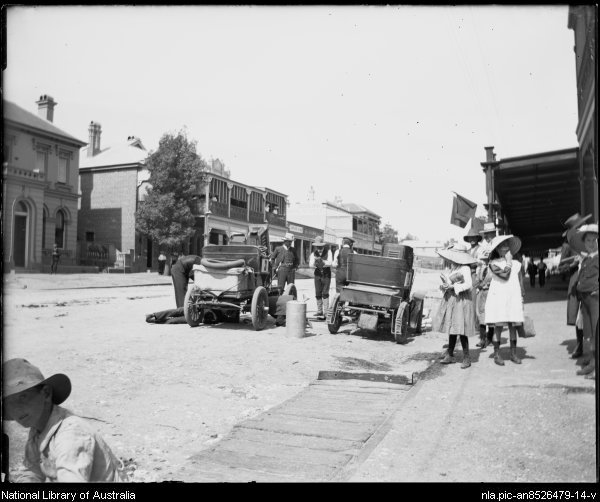
Sheridan Street scene in the early twentieth century; photograph by Dr Louis Gabriel

=== Township ===
The first move to establish Gundagai as a township was in 1838, when plans for the new settlement of "Gundagae [sic] on the Murrumbidgee, about 54 miles beyond Yass ..." were advertised for viewing at the office of the Surveyor-General in Sydney.

=== Origin of name ===
The name "Gundagai" may derive from "Gundagair", an 1838 pastoral run in the name of William Hutchinson to the immediate north of current day Gundagai. The Aboriginal word "gair" was recorded at Yass in 1836 by the naturalist George Bennett and means "bird", as in budgerigar or "good bird". In that context "Gundagai" means place of birds but that place name may refer to the area to the north of Gundagai not to Gundagai town. The word "gundagai" is also said to mean "cut with a hand-axe behind the knee".

=== Notable residents ===
In the 1830s, Horatio Wills and his family lived near Gundagai. The Wills' son, Thomas Wills who was born in the Gundagai area, is credited with co-inventing Australian Rules football and for being coach and captain to the first Australian Aboriginal cricket team.

Gundagai Aboriginal elders, Jimmy Clements and John Noble, attended the 1927 opening of the new Federal Parliament House in Canberra by the Duke of York (later George VI). Jimmy Clements, also known as King Billy, whose traditional name was Yangar, walked forward to respectfully salute the Duke and Duchess of York (later Queen Elizabeth The Queen Mother), and after that the two elders were formally presented to the royal couple as prominent citizens of Australia.

=== Post office ===
Gundagai Post Office opened on 1 April 1843 as the township, gazetted in 1838, developed.

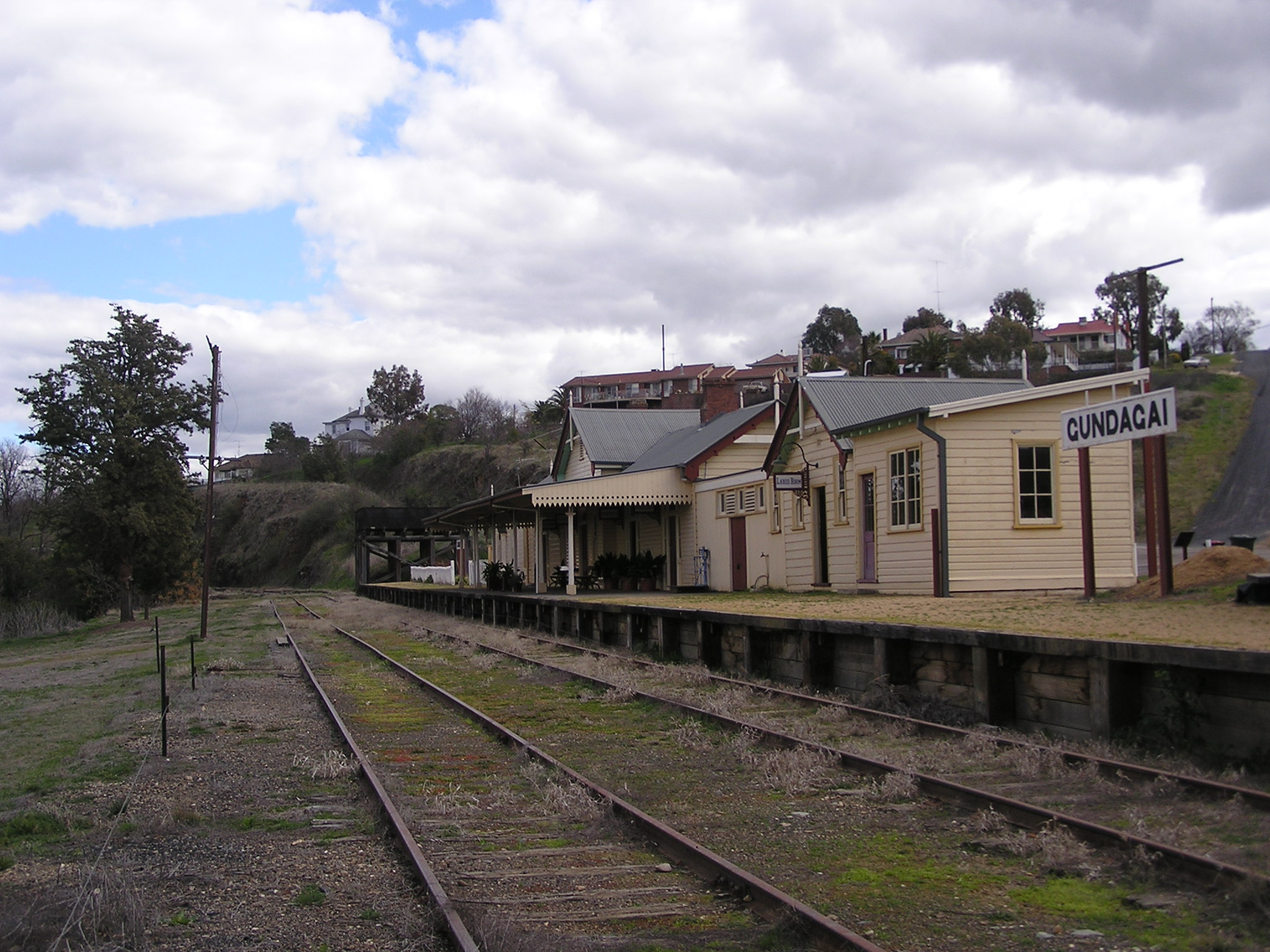
Gundagai railway station

=== Railway ===
The railway reached Gundagai in 1886 as a branch line from Cootamundra on the Main Southern railway line. The branch line was later extended, reaching Tumut in 1903 and Batlow and Kunama, at the end of the Tumut and Kunama railway lines, in 1923. The line was closed after flood damage in 1984.

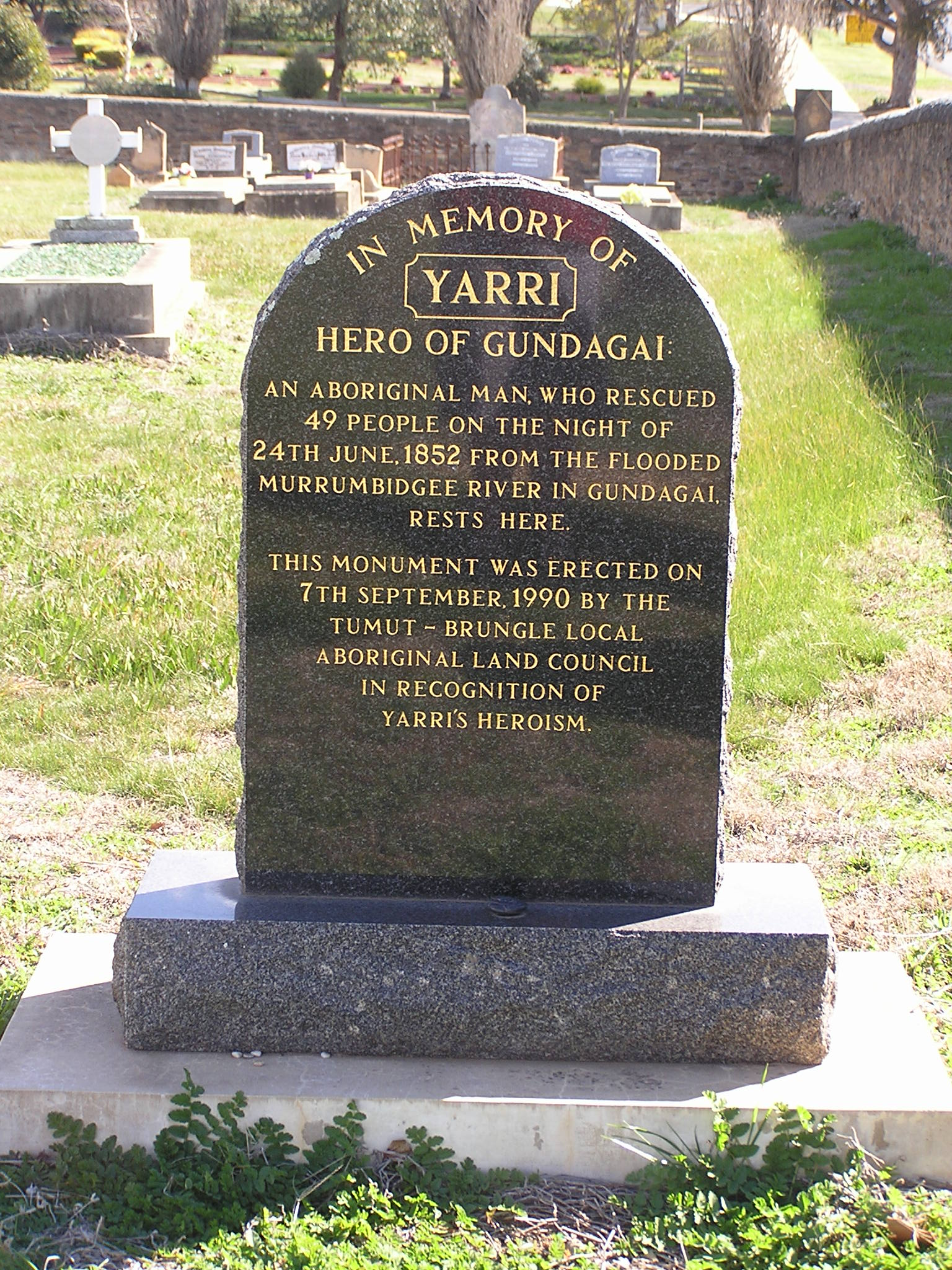
Memorial to Yarri in the Gundagai cemetery

=== Floods ===
The original town gazetted as Gundagai in 1838 was situated on the right hand bank of the Murrumbidgee River floodplain at the place colloquially known as "The Crossing Place". That town was hit by several large floods of the Murrumbidgee River. The Crown Commissioner for the Murrumbidgee District, Henry Bingham, praised the heroic actions of Aboriginal people at Gundagai in rescuing settlers from the 1844 flood. Bingham also requested a reward for local Aboriginal people.

Gundagai was still considered a frontier town in 1852. The Murrumbidgee flood of 25 June 1852 swept the first colonial town of Gundagai away, killing at least 78 people (perhaps 89) of the town's population of 250 people, making it one of the worst natural disasters in colonial Australia's history. Local Aboriginal men, Yarri, Jacky Jacky, Long Jimmy and one other played a role in saving many Gundagai people from the 1852 floodwaters, rescuing more than 40 people using bark canoes. A bronze sculpture of Yarri and Jacky Jacky with a canoe was unveiled in Gundagai in 2017. The number of people whom they saved is estimated as 68, one third of the town's population. The historical novel Bila Yarrudhanggalangdhuray (2021) by Anita Heiss is set around the time of the flood, and depicts some of the Wiradjuri people and settlers living in Gundagai at the time, using the Wiradjuri language.

Yarri was also known as Yarree or Coonong Denamundinna, A number of stories circulate suggesting that Yarri is the same as the native of that name mentioned as being responsible for the death of John Baxter at Caiguna in Western Australia during the expedition made by Edward John Eyre in 1841. This identification would place Yarri a long way from his traditional lands. The association of the two goes back to newspaper reports at the time. Yarri is also believed to have killed a young part Aboriginal woman 'Sally McLeod' near Gundagai in 1852. Warrants for Yarri/Yarree's arrest were issued by NSW Police after Brungle Aboriginal people reported him to the police over the Sally McLeod murder.

Following an even higher flood in 1853, North Gundagai was redeveloped at its current site, above the river, on Asbestos Hill and Mount Parnassus, and at South Gundagai on the slopes of Brummies Hill, using pre-existing survey plans made by James Larmer in 1850. The town commemorated the sesquicentenary of the 1852 flood in 2002.

The flood of June 1891 left several pastoral workers and four rescuers, who set out in a boat, stranded in trees just to the south of Gundagai. Edward True dragged a light skiff several miles over hills to the rescue site and managed to save several men from drowning. True also saved a young boy from drowning in a waterhole in 1887 and was awarded a Royal Humane Society of Australasia bravery award for that rescue as well. Edward True could not swim.

In recent years the Gundagai wetlands and marshes, home to many bird species, have disappeared, largely as a result of ground compaction by cattle and Gundagai Shire Council diverting ground water into underground pipes. The wetlands were on the North Gundagai Common, adjacent to the Gundagai High School, between Bourke and West Streets to the north of Punch Street, to the west and north of the North Gundagai cemetery, and at Coolac.

Major floods also occurred in 1974 and 2012.

=== Bushrangers ===
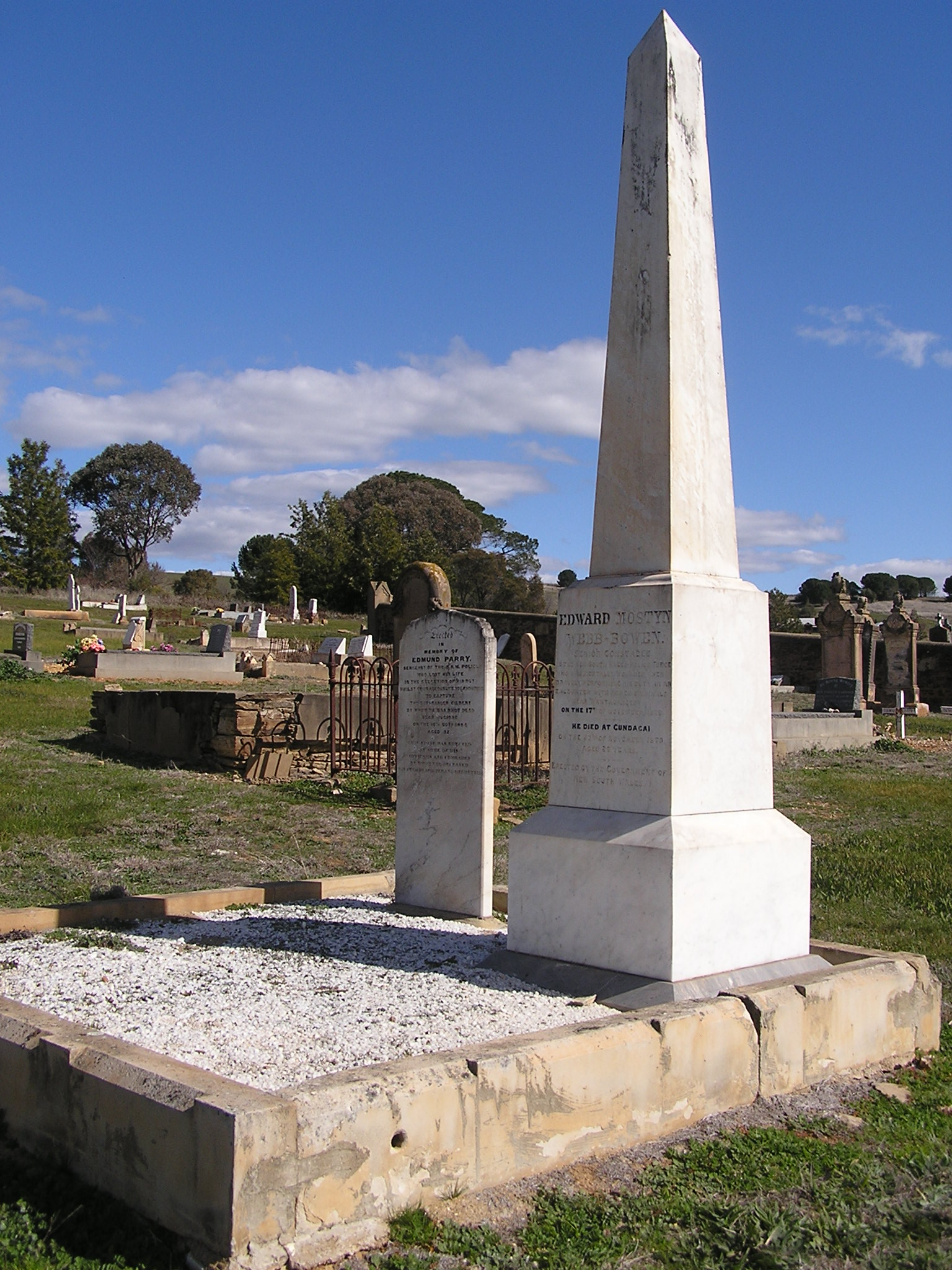
Monuments to policemen in Gundagai cemetery

As early as 1838, the Gundagai and Yass areas were being terrorised by armed bushrangers. Four men held up Robert Phillips and took a horse, the property of William Hutchinson of Murrumbidgee, who had possession of the land to the immediate north of Gundagai. On one occasion in 1843, a gang of five bushrangers, including one called "Blue Cap", held up and robbed Mr Andrews, the Gundagai postmaster and innkeeper. Cushan the bushranger was known to be operating in the area in 1846, and in 1850, to the south of Gundagai near Tarcutta, two bushrangers held up the Royal Mail, stole the Albury and Melbourne mailbags and rode off with the mail coach's horses.

In 1862, at Bethungra, to the west of Gundagai in the Gundagai Police District, the bushranger Jack-in-the-Boots was captured. A plot to rescue Jack-in-the-Boots, whose real name was Molloy, from police custody while he was being transferred from Gundagai to Yass gaol, was discovered.

In February 1862, the bushranger John Peisley was captured near Mundarlo and, by that evening, was lodged in the Gundagai gaol. Peisley was later hanged at Bathurst. In 1863, the bushrangers Stanley and Jones were arrested at Tumut after they had allegedly stolen saddles at Gundagai and hatched a plan to rob Mr Norton's store. Stanley could not be identified. In 1864, Jones was found not guilty.

Sergeant Parry was shot and killed in 1864 by the bushranger John Gilbert in a hold-up of the mail coach near Jugiong. Gilbert was a member of Ben Hall's gang that was active in the district in 1863–64. Patrick Gately and Patrick Lawler held up Keane's pub at Coolac in April, 1866. Also in the 1860s, to the north of Adelong, the bushranger Hawthorne mistook a man by the name of Grant for William Williams the gold mine owner, and killed Grant. By 1869, Harry Power, early mentor of famous Australian bushranger, Ned Kelly, was committing holdups near Adelong and as icing on the cake, by 1874 the bushranger prettily known as Jerry Blossom, was entertaining the district. In 1880, bushrangers held up the Chinese Camp at Gundagai then fled on horseback towards Burra, a locality known to harbour louts and for the ferocious fires that roar through the area.

Early in 1879, some Gundagai residents feared that the Ned Kelly gang was going to pay the town a visit and while "extra rifles and ammunition to defend the town" were applied for and special constables were sworn in, the Kelly Gang did not make an appearance.

The North Gundagai Anglican cemetery contains the graves of two policemen shot in the district by bushrangers. Senior Constable Webb-Bowen was killed by Captain Moonlite in November 1879 in a hostage incident at McGlede's farm. Trooper Edmund Parry, killed in an encounter with Ben Hall's gang near Jugiong, is buried next to the grave of Senior Constable Webb-Bowen. Captain Moonlite is also buried in the North Gundagai Anglican cemetery. Captain Moonlite had asked to be buried at Gundagai near his friends James Nesbitt and Augustus Wernicke. Both had been killed in the shoot-out at McGlede's Hut. Moonlite's request was not granted by the authorities of the time, but his remains were exhumed from Rookwood Cemetery and reinterred at Gundagai near to the unknown location of Nesbitt's grave in January 1995.

In the 1950s, bushrangers reappeared in the Gundagai area, jumping into the trailers of heavy transports moving along the Hume Highway and throwing contents out to nearby accomplices.

=== Tent cities ===
The old Gundagai Flour Mill in Sheridan Lane was also known as "The Sundowners", after the swagmen, or sundowners, who camped there each night. 'Sam the Sundowner', a famous Australian swaggie and principal character in the Australian comedy drama, The Road to Gundagai, was a regular resident at the Gundagai 'Sundowners' and was known for his rescues of near to drowning people from the inland rivers.

In 1901, a large camp of unemployed men and their families at South Gundagai was waiting for the proposed Gundagai rail line to begin construction. 500 of the men marched from south to north Gundagai, accompanied by the town band, to try to move commencement of the project, forward. There was a railway worker canvas town near the Gundagai Rail Station. Rail workers and their families who moved to Gundagai to work on the rail line, lived in tents in that area into the 1950s. The Chinese camp was in the area of today's Bowls Club as were the Chinese gardens. Burials of deceased Chinese people were in the pagan ground. All mine sites, of which there were several around Gundagai such as Burra, Reno, Jackalass, Jones Creek and Coolac, had miners' camps at or near them. The hill to the north of Gundagai known as Flower Hill once had a large tent settlement that was larger than the permanent North Gundagai residential area. Likewise the Spring Flat goldfield adjacent to the North Gundagai cemetery resulted in a sizeable tent township appearing there.

=== Riverboat trade ===
Several riverboats were associated with Gundagai, including the Explorer, the Gundagai, the Albury, the Nangus and the J.H.P.. Captain Francis Cadell ran the first steamer on the Murray River in 1853. In 1856 the sister steamers, the Albury and the Gundagai, were bought from Robert Napier and Sons of Scotland to Goolwa in pieces, by Captain Cadell, assembled at Goolwa then launched.

In 1855, Captain Cadell was aboard the paddlewheel steamer Gundagai for the first journey in it north of Goolwa, then in 1856 explored the Edward River system as Captain of the Gundagai. By 1865, the steamer Gundagai, under the command of Captain Cadell, was providing a transport service between Wanganui and the Waitotara in New Zealand, and getting supplies to troops, in support of the British Crown and the Crown's involvement in the New Zealand Wars. Captain Cadell became Superintendent of Colonial Transport (water) for New Zealand. On 25 June 1866 near Pātea New Zealand, the little paddlewheel steamer and expert crosser of sandbars, the Gundagai went onshore and broke in half. All hands were rescued. Her engines were installed in the Wallace, built at Dunedin, in 1868.

On 16 September 1858, the steamer Albury, under the command of Captain George Johnston with Captain Cadell on board, moored at Gundagai on the north bank of the Murrumbidgee at what was hoped to be named the 'Albury Wharf', after taking a bit over a month to ascend the Murrumbidgee from Lake Alexandrina. The Albury was the first steamer known to visit Gundagai. The steamer Albury was tied up to an old gum tree at Gundagai by Mr Norton of Gundagai who two years previously had the honour of naming the boat that set off from Gundagai to survey the Murrumbidgee under the command of Captain Robinson, the Explorer. Captain Robinson's 1855 survey of the Murrumbidgee in the Explorer was "for the purpose of ascertaining If that river presents any serious impediments to internal navigation" and the incentive for that survey came from Captain Cadell.

The steamer Nangus was constructed by the engineer Mr Chapman of Sydney, at Nangus Station near Gundagai for Mr Jenkins, owner of Nangus Station, to ply the Murrumbidgee River between Gundagai and Hay and she made her maiden journey in 1865. Nangus was a 12-horsepower, 70 feet long iron vessel, with two side paddles and towing two iron barges. It sank near Wagga after hitting a snag in 1867.

The steamer J.H.P. was launched in 1866 and sank between Hay and Balranald in October 1868. "It was raised but sank twice more, then was dismantled in 1879." On 20 September 1870, the J.H.P., then owned by Edward Warby, journeyed up the Murrumbidgee from Wagga to Gundagai without incident.

=== Photographs of Gundagai ===
Between 1899 and 1900, Dr Louis Gabriel, took up photography, photographing townlife in the period up to around 1906, when his responsibilities for the new hospital took precedence. He is considered one of Australia's best early documentary photographers, partly for his observant and dispassionate approach. However, they are sometimes highly stylised by integrating his and others shadows in the image, or by making full use of the radical perspective of a wide-angle lens. The question of how and why his images are outstanding is central to the novel 'Belonging' written by G McDougall. The equally interesting story of how Gabriel's glass-plate negatives came into the National Library's possession is found in the NLA's 'Gundagai Album'. The negatives were preserved and presented to the National Library of Australia after his death and a selection was published in 1976 as a Gundagai Album.

== Demographics ==
In 1911, the total population of Gundagai Shire was 1,921. It changed little in the course of the twentieth century, being 2,308 at the time of the 1981 census and 1,998 at the 2006 census.

At the 2016 census, Gundagai recorded a population of 1,925. 85.6% were born in Australia and 90.4% spoke only English at home. The most common ancestries in Gundagai were Australian 38.6%, English 33.2%, Irish 9.8% and Scottish 4.3%. The most common responses for religion were Anglican 39.8%, Catholic 32.5% and no religion 11.8%.

Historical population
Year	Pop.	±%
1921	1,150	—
1933		—
1947		—
1954	2,127	—
1961	2,167	+1.9%
1966	2,116	−2.4%
1971	2,078	−1.8%
1976	2,074	−0.2%
1981	2,308	+11.3%
1986	2,124	−8.0%
1991	2,069	−2.6%
1996	2,064	−0.2%
2001	1,989	−3.6%
2006	1,998	+0.5%
2011	1,926	−3.6%
2016	1,925	−0.1%
2021	1,970	+2.3%
Source: Australian Bureau of Statistics data.

== Geography ==
Gundagai is an inland town with an elevation of 232 metres (761 ft). Almost all of the shire is located in the South West Slopes bio-region and is part of the Riverina agricultural region. The eastern part of the shire (towards Wee Jasper) can also be considered part of the South Eastern Highlands bioregion.

North Gundagai is situated on top of significant, Jindalee Group, Cambrian period geology from which the chrysotile asbestos bearing Gundagai serpentinite originates also indicating prehistoric links to the Gondwana supercontinent.

The Shire has been extensively cleared for agriculture and more than 80% of the area is used for dryland cropping and grazing. Less than 1% of the shire is managed for conservation. There are few remaining examples of the original vegetation cover.

Gundagai shire is primarily rural, with a small population. Eighty per cent of the shire's population live in the town of Gundagai. There are four villages in the Shire: Coolac, Tumblong, Muttama and Nangus, with populations ranging from 40 to 90 people.

=== Climate ===
Gundagai has a temperate climate typical of the South West Slopes. Under Köppen climate classification, the town has a humid subtropical climate (Cfa) with characteristics of the Mediterranean climate (Csa). Seasonal variation is great, especially about the maximum temperatures. Summers are hot, sunny and prone to dry periods; winters are cool and cloudy with many rain days and occasional sleet, though snowfalls are rare.

Climate data for Gundagai Ridge Street (1976–1995); 232 m AMSL; 35.08° S, 148.10° E
Month	Jan	Feb	Mar	Apr	May	Jun	Jul	Aug	Sep	Oct	Nov	Dec	Year
Record high °C (°F)	43.3 (109.9)	42.4 (108.3)	38.7 (101.7)	35.5 (95.9)	27.3 (81.1)	22.0 (71.6)	19.6 (67.3)	26.8 (80.2)	30.4 (86.7)	33.5 (92.3)	40.4 (104.7)	42.1 (107.8)	43.3 (109.9)
Mean daily maximum °C (°F)	31.6 (88.9)	31.4 (88.5)	27.8 (82.0)	22.8 (73.0)	18.0 (64.4)	13.6 (56.5)	12.8 (55.0)	14.9 (58.8)	17.6 (63.7)	21.7 (71.1)	25.8 (78.4)	29.2 (84.6)	22.3 (72.1)
Mean daily minimum °C (°F)	15.0 (59.0)	15.6 (60.1)	12.9 (55.2)	8.7 (47.7)	6.0 (42.8)	3.2 (37.8)	2.0 (35.6)	3.1 (37.6)	5.1 (41.2)	7.5 (45.5)	10.3 (50.5)	13.1 (55.6)	8.5 (47.4)
Record low °C (°F)	6.5 (43.7)	4.6 (40.3)	3.0 (37.4)	0.0 (32.0)	−3.6 (25.5)	−3.4 (25.9)	−5.1 (22.8)	−4.5 (23.9)	−2.0 (28.4)	−1.0 (30.2)	2.0 (35.6)	3.9 (39.0)	−5.1 (22.8)
Average precipitation mm (inches)	65.8 (2.59)	41.1 (1.62)	43.6 (1.72)	54.9 (2.16)	67.7 (2.67)	60.3 (2.37)	78.6 (3.09)	63.2 (2.49)	68.4 (2.69)	69.2 (2.72)	49.5 (1.95)	52.3 (2.06)	714.4 (28.13)
Average precipitation days (≥ 0.2 mm)	6.4	4.6	5.7	6.8	8.9	11.6	13.2	13.0	11.2	9.3	8.2	7.0	105.9
Average afternoon relative humidity (%)	34	36	40	49	62	71	69	60	56	50	42	38	51
Source: Australian Bureau of Meteorology; Gundagai Ridge Street

Climate data for Gundagai (Nangus Rd, 1995–2022); 225 m AMSL; 35.06° S, 148.10° E
Month	Jan	Feb	Mar	Apr	May	Jun	Jul	Aug	Sep	Oct	Nov	Dec	Year
Record high °C (°F)	45.2 (113.4)	44.0 (111.2)	39.4 (102.9)	34.8 (94.6)	26.5 (79.7)	21.9 (71.4)	21.0 (69.8)	25.9 (78.6)	31.0 (87.8)	36.0 (96.8)	41.6 (106.9)	42.6 (108.7)	45.2 (113.4)
Mean daily maximum °C (°F)	32.7 (90.9)	31.1 (88.0)	27.9 (82.2)	23.2 (73.8)	17.8 (64.0)	14.0 (57.2)	13.1 (55.6)	15.0 (59.0)	18.6 (65.5)	22.6 (72.7)	26.3 (79.3)	29.7 (85.5)	22.7 (72.8)
Mean daily minimum °C (°F)	16.9 (62.4)	16.5 (61.7)	13.5 (56.3)	8.6 (47.5)	5.0 (41.0)	3.4 (38.1)	2.6 (36.7)	2.8 (37.0)	5.1 (41.2)	8.1 (46.6)	11.8 (53.2)	14.0 (57.2)	9.0 (48.2)
Record low °C (°F)	5.9 (42.6)	6.3 (43.3)	3.6 (38.5)	−1.2 (29.8)	−3.1 (26.4)	−4.6 (23.7)	−5.5 (22.1)	−4.8 (23.4)	−3.6 (25.5)	−1.6 (29.1)	1.7 (35.1)	4.9 (40.8)	−5.5 (22.1)
Average precipitation mm (inches)	45.6 (1.80)	49.4 (1.94)	50.3 (1.98)	32.1 (1.26)	38.5 (1.52)	63.4 (2.50)	61.4 (2.42)	53.5 (2.11)	57.6 (2.27)	51.3 (2.02)	66.3 (2.61)	55.9 (2.20)	625.3 (24.63)
Average precipitation days (≥ 0.2 mm)	6.2	5.7	6.3	5.4	7.1	11.7	12.9	10.9	9.4	8.4	7.8	6.4	98.2
Average afternoon relative humidity (%)	31	34	36	42	55	66	67	59	54	45	39	31	47
Source: Australian Bureau of Meteorology; Gundagai (Nangus Rd)

== Heritage listings ==
Gundagai has a number of heritage-listed sites, including:

- Cootamundra–Tumut railway: Gundagai Rail Bridge over Murrumbidgee River
- Cootamundra–Tumut railway: Gundagai railway station
- Middleton Drive: Prince Alfred Bridge

== Economy ==
Other than tourism generated by bush appeal and the historic bridges, Gundagai's economy remains driven by sheep and cattle, as well as wheat, lucerne and maize production.

As of 2005, secondary industries in Gundagai included the Gundagai Meat Processors Plant and D J Lynch Engineering. The meatworks is the shire's largest single employer, with over 100 employees. The latter firm has produced work for major construction projects, including building steel spans for the Olympic Stadium in Sydney.

=== Gold mining ===
Gold was identified by the geologist Rev. W. B. Clarke at Gundagai in 1842. A gold rush hit the area in 1858 following further discoveries of gold. Mining continued initially until 1875, with a second gold rush in 1894. Mines operated again until well into the 20th century with some mining activity still occurring in 2007. The best known historical mines were the Robinson and Rice's Mine (Long Tunnel Mine) a few miles to the south west of Gundagai and the Prince of Wales Mine (where Herbert Hoover, the future President of the United States, was the mining engineer in about 1900) a few miles to the immediate west of Gundagai. Both mines struck the orebody in quartz reefs along serpentine/diorite contact zones with finds of gold telluride (of bismuth origin) also found.

Nangus Island in the middle of the Murrumbidgee River at Nangus is marked as one of the early goldfields and was previously named 'M'Arthur Island'. It is adjacent to where the highly auriferous Adelong Creek enters the Murrumbidgee.

=== Asbestos mining ===
Asbestos was first mined commercially in Australia, at Gundagai. Actinolite was mined along Jones Creek just to the west of the town but there are several deposits in the immediate area. Some fibres were two feet long. Prior to 1918 this was the only source of asbestos in New South Wales. Northern Gundagai is built on a hill sometimes known as 'Asbestos Hill' and excavations in the area free the asbestos into the air.

Chromite, talc, magnesite, copper and slate were also mined at Gundagai.

== Notable places ==
=== Gundagai Bakery ===
Gundagai Bakery is the oldest bakery in Australia, opening in 1864.

=== Rusconi's marble masterpiece ===
Local monumental mason Frank Rusconi, carved a miniature Baroque Italian palace from 20,948 pieces of marble collected from around New South Wales. The work is 1.2 metres high and, commencing in 1910, took 28 years to complete. It can be seen in the Gundagai tourist office.

Rusconi sculpted the base for the Dog on the Tuckerbox monument, and created the model of the dog, which was cast at Oliver's Foundry in Sydney.

=== Niagara Café ===
The Niagara Café opened in 1938 and was a notable stop on the Hume Highway. The cafe makes much of a brief visit by then Prime Minister, John Curtin, in 1942, with a display in the window of the cafe of the crockery used by Curtin and Curtin's link to the cafe. Niagara Café was established by a Kytherian Greek, Strati Notara, and was the oldest continuously Greek-run cafe in Australia. In August 2019, the cafe closed and was put up for sale; it was subsequently restored by its new owners and reopened in June 2022.

=== Heritage listed items ===
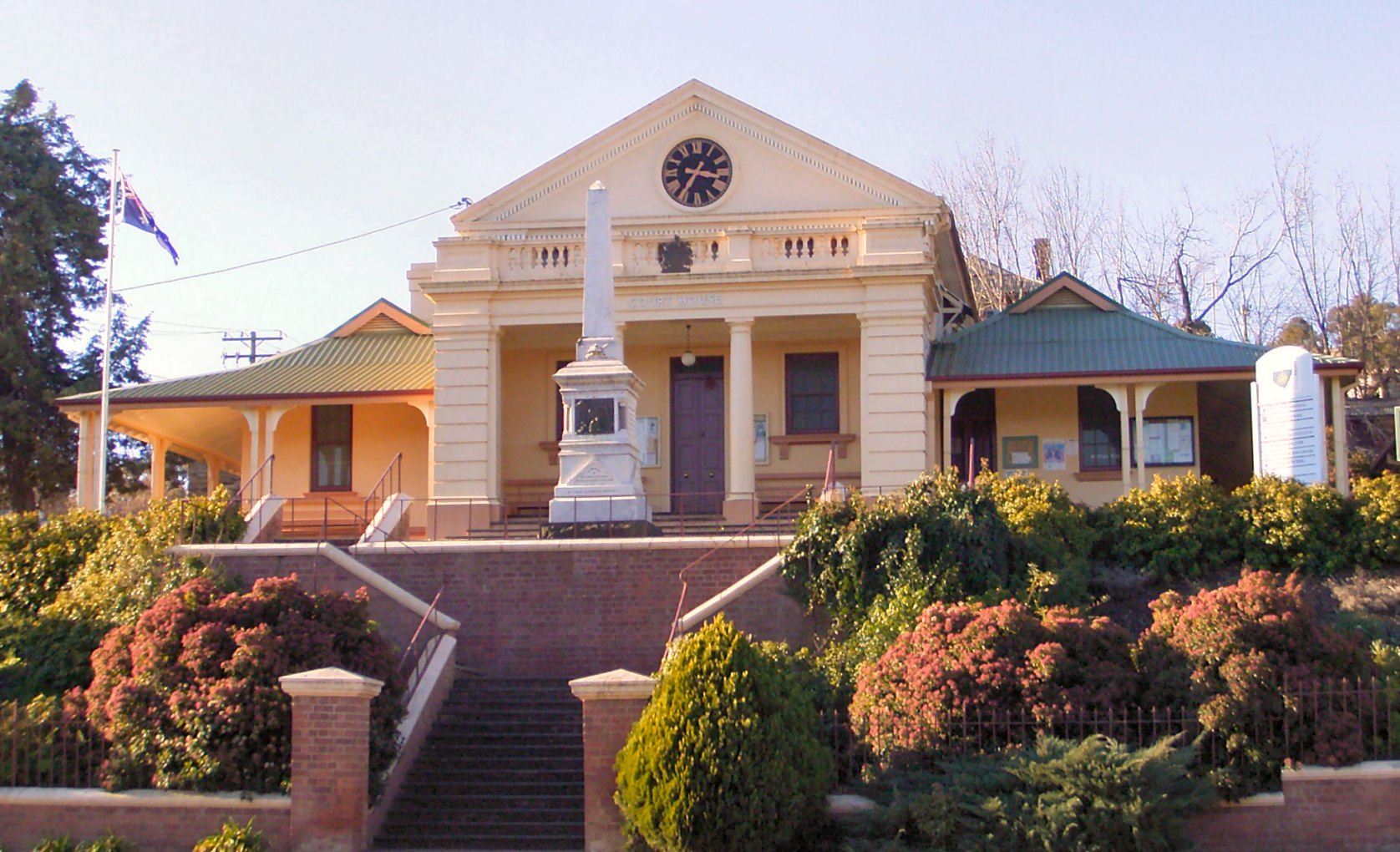
Court House, completed in 1859, was one of the first stone buildings to be erected after the floods of 1852. The interior was originally of red cedar but was destroyed by a fire in 1943 and it was rebuilt with mountain ash. The monument in front of the building is a Boer War memorial.

A number of places in Gundagai are on the New South Wales state heritage register and the Register of the National Estate.

- Gundagai rail bridge over Murrumbidgee River
- Gundagai Railway Station and yard group
- Gundagai Courthouse
- Gundagai District Hospital
- Murrumbidgee River Underbridge, Gundagai
- Gundagai Rail Bridge Approaches
- Old Gundagai Town Site
- Prince Alfred Bridge

=== River crossings ===
Gundagai is located at a crossing place of the Murrumbidgee River. There were several places at Gundagai that travellers could and did cross the river. The route across the Murrumbidgee at Gundagai eventually became the Great South Road.

The Main Roads Management Act of June 1858 declared the Great Southern Road, from near Sydney through Goulburn and Gundagai to Albury, as one of the three main roads in the colony. However, its southern reaches were described as only a 'scarcely formed bullock track' as late as 1858. The road was improved in the mid-1860s with some sections near Gundagai 'metalled' and all creeks bridged between Adelong Creek (approximately 10 kilometres south of Gundagai) and Albury. In 1914 the road was declared a main road of New South Wales, and subsequently designated as state highway 2 and named the Hume Highway in 1928. The highway bypassed Gundagai in 1977 with the opening of the Sheahan Bridge.

==== Fords and former bridges ====
There are several old fords at Gundagai, including:

- the one at the western end of Hanley Street that crosses Jones Creek
- a ford on the southern continuation of Bourke Street across Jones Creek
- one at the western end of Sheridan Lane that crosses Jones Creek
- a ford at the western end of William Street that crosses Jones Creek
- the Otway Street ford across Morleys Creek
- a 1950s concrete ford that crosses Morleys Creek on the immediate western side of Yarri Bridge
- a very old ford that crosses Morleys Creek east of the Yarri Bridge
- the Warramore Ford that crosses the Murrumbidgee across to Tarrabandra between the Gundagai showground and Mingay
- the Sandy Falls ford
- the ford across Muttama Creek at the Nine Mile, Coolac, that is a well noted crossing place in local poetry, folklore and history
- the Gundagai township ford of the Murrumbidgee in line with Otway Street
- 'Adelong Crossing Place', now 'Tumblong', where there used to be a ford across Adelong Creek

There is also the Wantabadgery crossing place that these days has been replaced by the low level Mundarlo Bridge, downstream of Gundagai.

Often bridges have replaced fords but not always in exactly the same location, as bridges require high stream banks, whereas fords favour low banks. Two known old bridges on Morleys Creek no longer exist. Learys Bridge, a wooden bridge that crossed Morleys Creek in line with Byron Street, Gundagai was burned down by Gundagai Shire Council in the 1990s. Rileys Bridge that crossed Morleys Creek at the midpoint between Byron and Homer Streets was washed away in the 1851 Gundagai flood.

==== Bridges ====
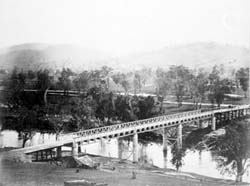
The Prince Alfred Bridge crosses the Murrumbidgee River at Gundagai, photographed c. 1885.

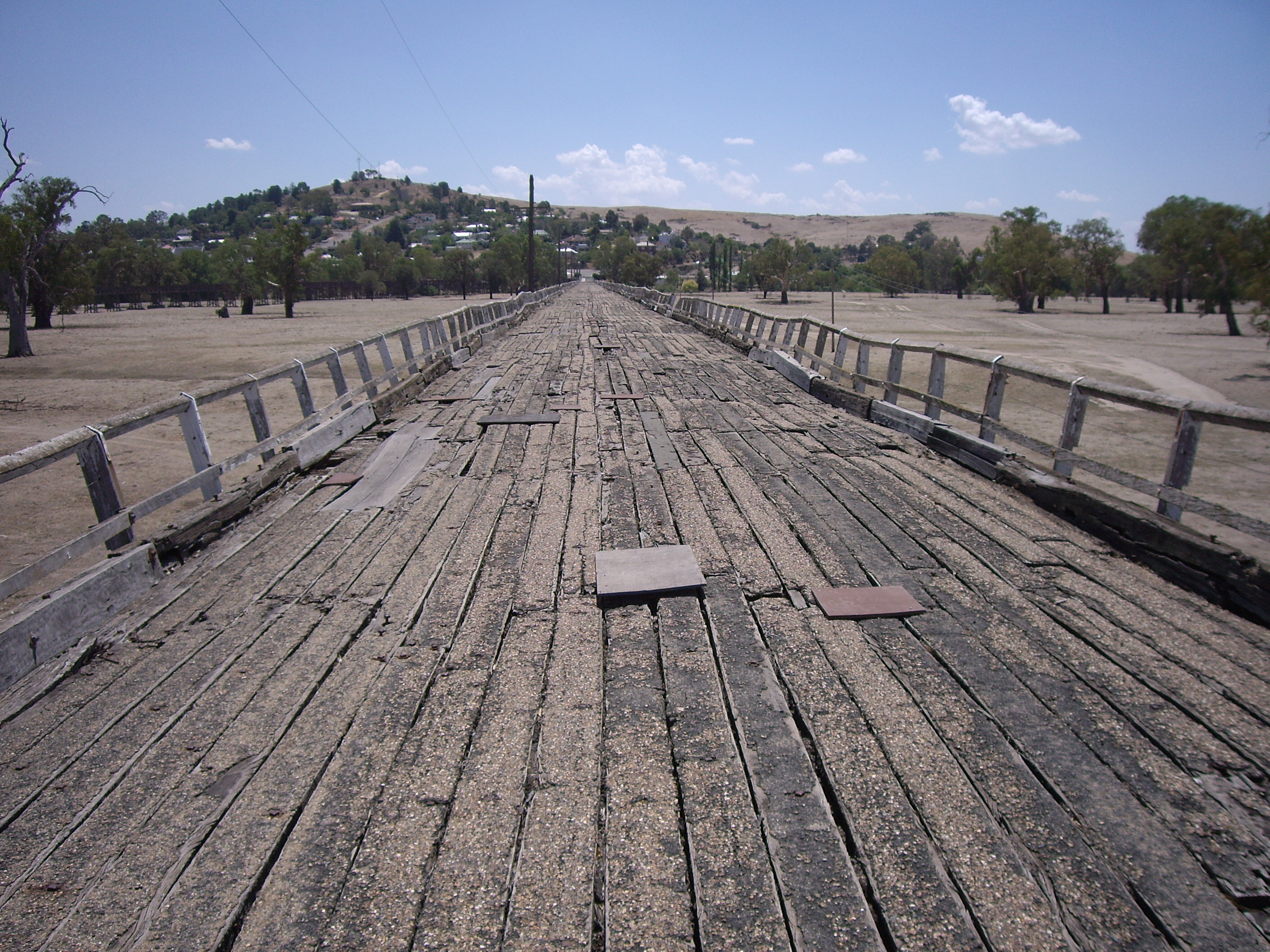
The Prince Alfred Bridge; part of the old Hume Highway

In 1867, a wrought iron truss bridge, the Prince Alfred Bridge, was completed across the Murrumbidgee River. The bridge was designed by William Christopher Bennett and was constructed by Francis Bell and Frederick Augustus Franklin and had a total length of 314 m, including three wrought iron truss spans each of 31.4 m across the river itself, two southern approach spans of timber, and twenty-three northern approach spans of 9.14 m, also of timber, rising on a gradient of 1 in 30 from the level of the floodplain. It was the first iron truss bridge to be built in New South Wales.

Sometime before 1896, the twenty-three northern spans were replaced with a longer structure consisting of 105 timber spans varying from 4.6 m to 9.14 m long, crossing the full width of the floodplain. In that year a ramp was installed on the western side of the bridge six spans north of the three main spans, in roughly the same location as the present ramp, in order to divert traffic from the timber approach spans, presumably because of maintenance problems with these spans.

In 1896, the 105 northern approach spans were replaced by a new approach structure of seventy-six spans on a different alignment, and the southern approach was slightly lengthened, giving a total length of 922 metres, which was 12 m less than the previous length. It remained the longest bridge in New South Wales until 1932 when the Sydney Harbour Bridge was completed, . In this configuration the bridge remained in use until 1977, but extensive repair work was carried out in the early 1930s.

In 1903 a second (railway) bridge across the Murrumbdgee with a total length of 819 metres was built for the extension of the railway from Gundagai to Tumut.

In 1977, a third bridge, the Sheahan Bridge was opened, a prestressed concrete bridge as part of the Hume Highway bypass of Gundagai, to replace the Prince Alfred Bridge. It closely follows the alignment of one of the options considered in the early 1930s for a replacement bridge as an alternative to the repair of the Prince Alfred Bridge. It is 1,143 metres (3,750 ft) long, 6 m shorter than the Sydney Harbour Bridge. It was named after Bill Sheahan, who was a member of the New South Wales Legislative Assembly for Yass from 1941 to 1950 and for Burrinjuck from 1950 to 1973 and held various ministerial portfolios. In 2010, it was duplicated to carry the southbound carriageway of the Hume Highway.

== As an iconic Australian town ==
Although a small town, Gundagai is a popular topic for writers, including writers of poems and songs, and has become the representation of the typical Australian country town. Gundagai also has a long and strong oral tradition or folklore related to both Aboriginal and European events, as the location was an important gathering place and river crossing for teamsters ("bullockies"), bush travellers, swagmen, shearers and drovers,.

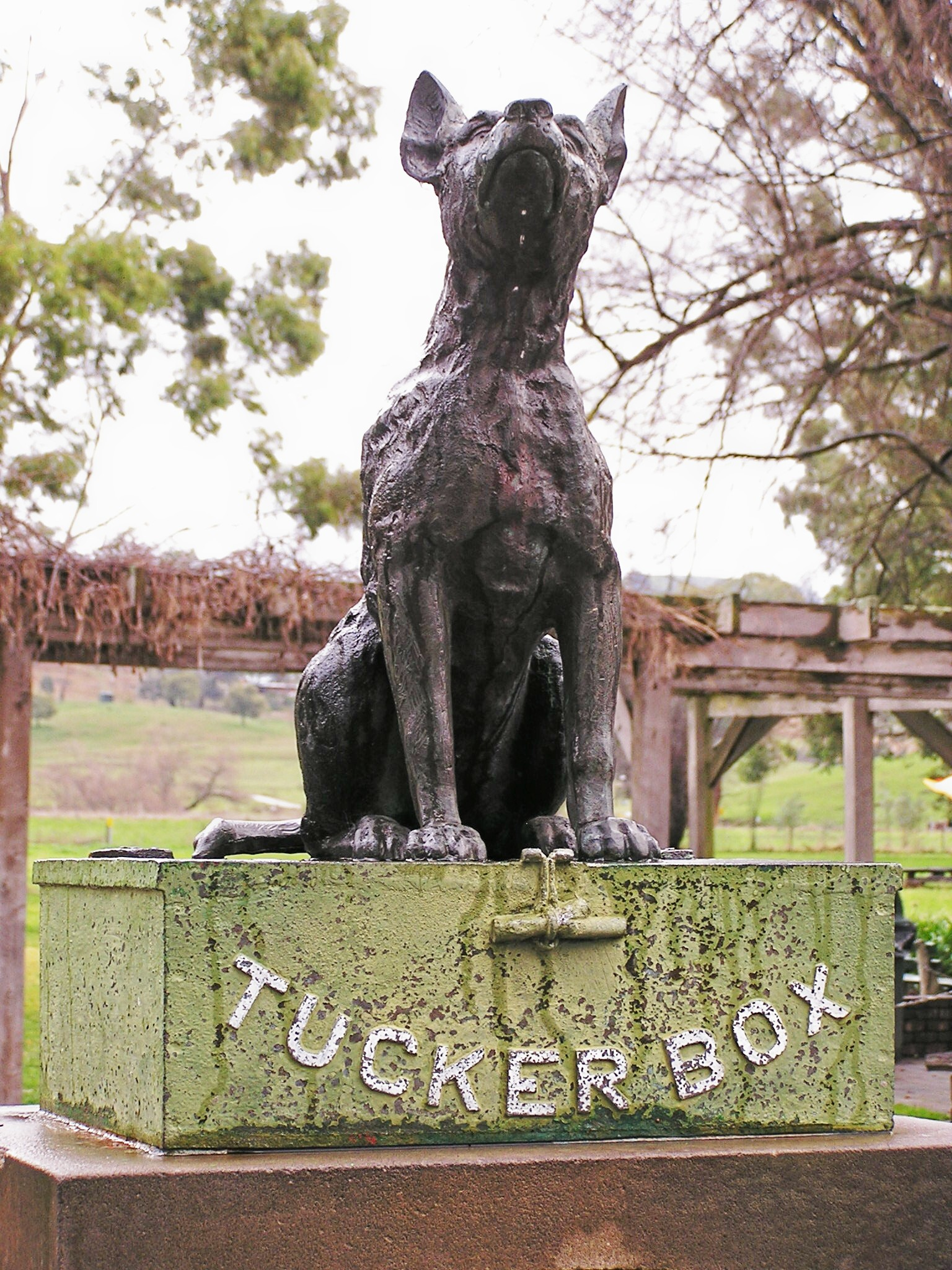
Statue of the Dog on the Tuckerbox at Snake Gully, five miles from Gundagai. The statue was unveiled by the then Prime Minister Joseph Lyons in 1932 as a tribute to pioneers.

Gundagai, perhaps more than any other Australian locality, is referred to in stories, songs and poems. They include early anonymous writer Theta's poem "'Ode to the Dead of Gundagai", James Riley's 'The Gundagai Calamity', Jack Moses's 'Nine Miles From Gundagai', and Jack O'Hagan's songs 'Where the Dog Sits on the Tuckerbox (Five Miles from Gundagai)', 'Along The Road To Gundagai', 'Snake Gully Swagger', and 'When a Boy from Alabama Meets a Girl from Gundagai'. Gundagai also features in the song 'The Grand Old Hills of Gundagai'. A 1971 educational short film, Mainly for Women, concerned a young woman who migrates from Gundagai to Sydney. A 2010 short story collection by Jeanine Leane, Purple Threads, won a major literary award, the David Unaipon Award, and was shortlisted for a Commonwealth literary award.

Other references in literature include Banjo Paterson's "The Road to Gundagai", and the traditional ballad 'Flash Jack from Gundagai'. The great British folksinger A. L. Lloyd, who spent time in Australia, recorded both the shearing song 'Flash Jack from Gundagai' and 'The Road to Gundagai'.

Additionally, the town is mentioned in Henry Lawson's 'Scots of the Riverina,' and C. J. Dennis's 'The Traveller'. Miles Franklin's 'Brent of Bin Bin' saga is set in the area, and it includes an account of the flood of 1852.

== Culture ==
=== Sport ===
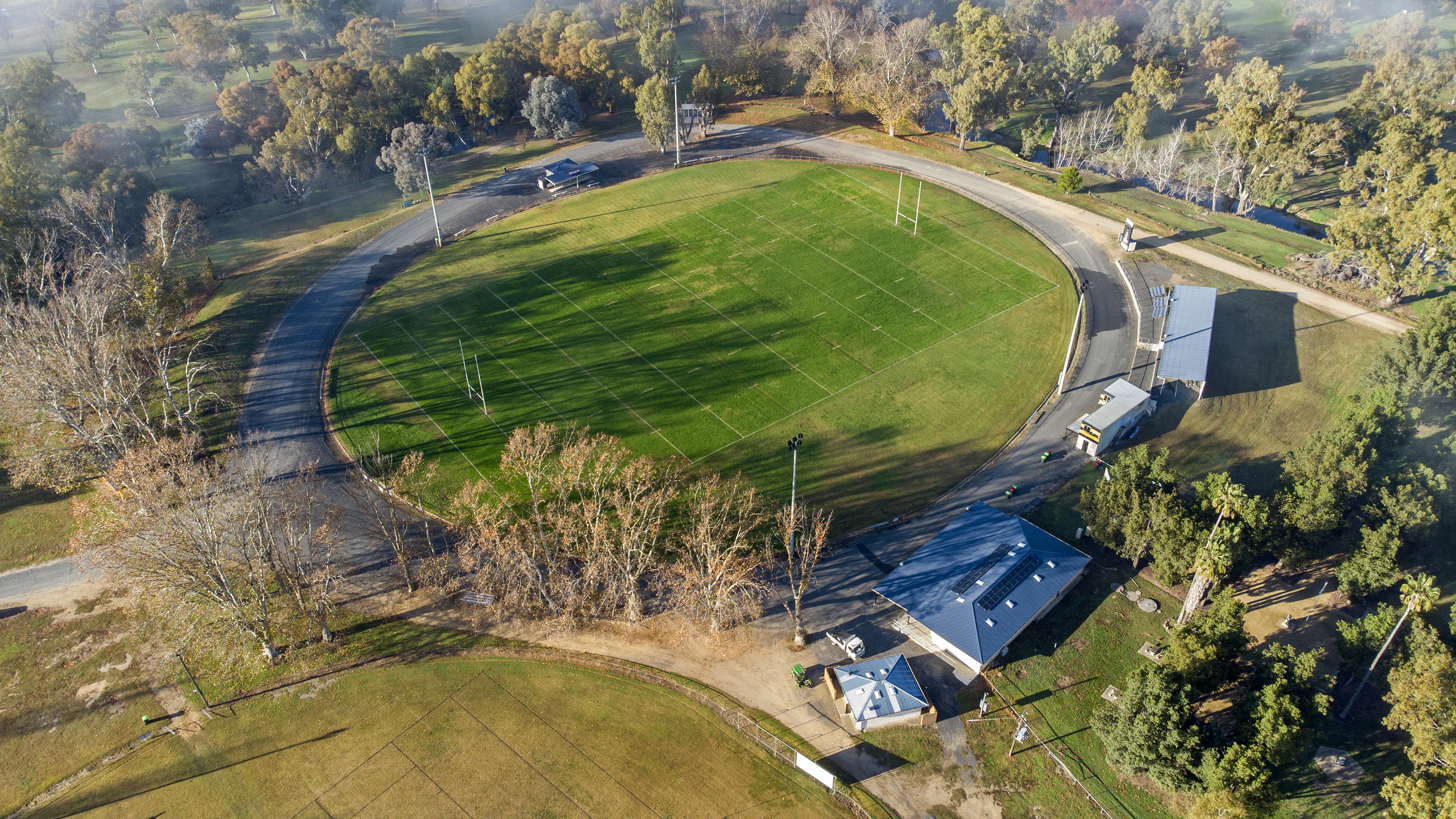
Aerial view of Anzac Park Oval in Gundagai

The most popular sport in Gundagai is rugby league. The Gundagai Tigers play in the Group 9 Rugby League competition. The club plays at Anzac Park Oval, often drawing crowds up to several thousands for derbies against Tumut and Junee.

=== Cultural events ===
The Snake Gully Cup festival is held each November featuring the Snake Gully Cup two-day racing carnival. It is one of southern New South Wales' premier race events. The idea of conducting a race called the Snake Gully Cup was originally floated in a committee meeting of the Gundagai Adelong racing club in the early 1970s. The race however did not materialise due to the lack of support from the committee of the day. The idea gained real momentum at the unveiling of the statues of Dad, Dave, Mum and Mabel at the Snake Gully Service Centre in November 1979 when Ted Tout, one of the principles of the centre mentioned the possibility of a Snake Gully Cup being run as a picnic race meeting similar to the popular Bong Bong Cup meeting. In November 1982, the Gundagai Adelong Racing Club conducted a mid-week race meeting as part of the 50th anniversary celebrations for the Dog on the Tuckerbox. The feature race at the meeting was the Snake Gully Flying Handicap, a 1000 metres. The Snake Gully Flying Handicap remained as the feature race of the club's November meeting for the next two years. In 1984 the club applied for TAB status for the 1985 meeting when the proposal was to conduct the first Snake Gully Cup over 1400 metres. The application was unsuccessful. This was the beginning of the Snake Gully Cup in its current format. In 1990 the club once again applied for TAB status for the Cup and were successful in securing this for the 1992 Cup. From that date the Cup has only been conducted on a Friday. The second day of the meet is called 'Hair of the Dog' and is a more family orientated race day.

Gundagai had a "Mud Muster", put on by the Nowra Mud, Sweat and Beers people, held on 2 April 2016, sponsored by Gundagai Shire Council. The event involved digging large mud pits throughout the highly significant and documented Aboriginal ceremonial ground on the North Gundagai Common, and filling the very large and deep holes with water. Hundreds of competitors wallowed through the pits and other obstacles.

The town's rugby league team competed in the Maher Cup.

The Turning Wave Festival, a music and cultural festival celebrating Irish and Celtic migration to Australia, was held in Gundagai up to 2011, but moved to Yass in 2012.

== Council merger ==
In 2016, Gundagai and Cootamundra shires were forced to amalgamate into the Cootamundra–Gundagai Regional Council, against the wishes of the Mayor of Gundagai, Abb McAlister, and many of the town's businesspeople. Signs protesting against the amalgamation, sponsored by the Gundagai Council in Exile, were prominently displayed throughout Gundagai for several years. Five years on, the problems associated with the merger remained an issue. The demerger of the councils began in August 2022 and was expected to be completed in 2024, in time for the local government elections scheduled in that year.

== See also ==
- Gundagai lore

== Notes ==
- Moses, Jack (1939). Nine miles from Gundagai. Angus & Robertson.
