= Louis Gabriel =

Charles Louis Gabriel (25 June 1857 – 10 February 1927) was an Australian photographer and medical practitioner. He was born in Kempsey, New South Wales, to Dr. Charles Gabriel and Emma Rudder. Despite his upbringing in a remote coastal settlement, he followed family tradition and entered the medical profession. He earned medical, surgical and maternity qualifications at the University of Edinburgh, graduating with distinction. After returning to Australia, likely practicing as a ship's doctor during the voyage, he worked briefly in Sydney before relocating to Gundagai in 1887.

Gabriel practised medicine in Gundagai and began photographing the region around 1899. Over the following decade he produced more than eight hundred glass plate negatives. These images, now held in the National Library of Australia (NLA), are recognized as significant records of Gundagai and rural Australia. Contemporary assessments describe his work as precise visual documentation. He is sometimes characterised as a local country doctor and amateur photographer, although the scope and technical quality of his surviving images indicate a more substantial contribution.

== Family heritage ==
Gabriel’s ancestry included French, English, West Indian, and Welsh heritage. His darker complexion distinguished him within colonial Australian society, which at the time was increasingly oriented toward racial exclusion through the development of the White Australia policy. He was commonly referred to as “the black doctor.” Commentators have often overlooked the racial dimension of his life, despite its relevance to the social and political context of nineteenth- and early twentieth-century Australia.

The Gabriel family history reflects patterns of displacement associated with slavery and the African diaspora. Some of Gabriel’s forebears, having lived through upheavals linked to the Napoleonic period, adopted strategies for navigating racial prejudice, including establishing long-term residence, engaging in professional work, and integrating into local communities.

His father, also named Charles Louis Gabriel (1819 – 1902), was born on Martinique and first visited Sydney as a surgeon with a French expedition to the South Pacific. He later returned to Australia, settled in Kempsey, and became the district's first doctor. His mother, Rhoda Emma Gabriel (née Rudder) (died 1871), was the daughter of English immigrants from Birmingham. Her father, Enoch Rudder, and presumably her mother, Emma Betts, were among the earliest European settlers in the Kempsey district from 1835 and were associated with Edward Hammond Hargraves in the period preceding the discovery of gold in New South Wales.

Gabriel was one of seven children in the family.

== Historical backdrop ==
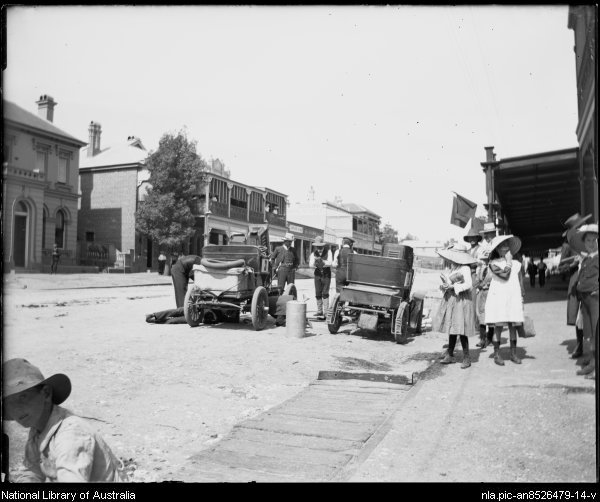
Sheridan Street scene in the early twentieth century; photograph by Dr Louis Gabriel

Louis Gabriel's life also coincided with a period in which Gundagai became firmly embedded in Australian cultural mythology through stories, poetry, public events, and press coverage. He lived in the town during the years when Gundagai began to be portrayed, initially in a general sense, as embodying qualities later associated with Australian identity: democracy, egalitarianism, resilience, and practicality.

== Career ==
Gabriel practised in Gundagai from 1887 until his death in 1927. He became the chief and at that time the sole medical officer of Gundagai Hospital in 1889. During the economic depression of the 1890s, the hospital’s subscription-based funding model came under strain, and disputes with the Management Committee resulted in his dismissal. After several years of conflict with a competing local doctor, O’Dwyer, Gabriel regained the position and held it until his death in 1927.

Gabriel’s appointment as Government Medical Officer in 1893 had a significant influence on his professional focus. Although trained in surgery, he became an advocate for public health and community hygiene. He repeatedly promoted higher standards in food and water safety, the maintenance of public and private spaces, and measures for the prevention of infectious disease. He was a consistent proponent of establishing a reticulated water supply for the town and, most notably, of constructing a new hospital built according to contemporary medical standards. He also argued that Gundagai Hospital should provide equal treatment to patients of all races, at a time when Aboriginal people were largely restricted from entering the town.

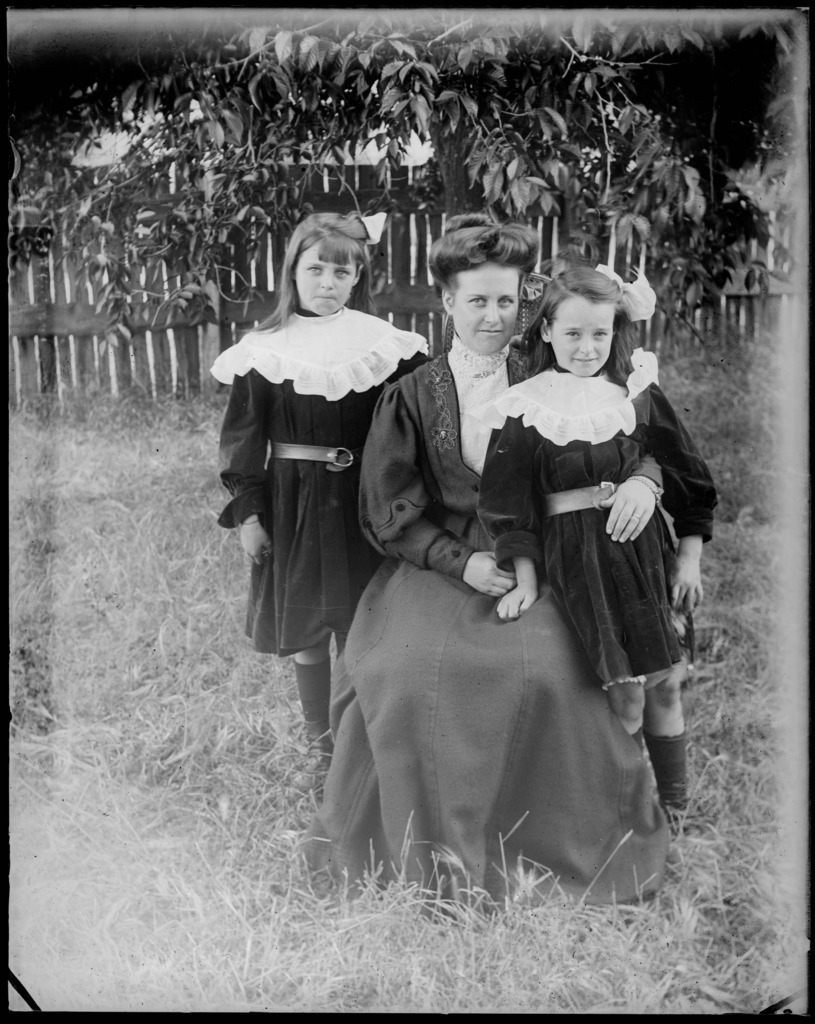
Mrs Jessie Gabriel with her two daughters.

== Family and personal life ==
Gabriel was Catholic. His 1891 marriage to Jessie Walton ended in separation in early 1911. They had no children together. Jessie Violette Walton (née Young) was a widow with two daughters from her previous marriage.

== Death ==
Gabriel died at Tumut Hospital on 10 February 1927. He had travelled to Tumut to undergo surgery for appendicitis by a doctor in whom he had confidence. Although he survived the operation, he died a few days later. He was buried in the Catholic section of the Gundagai cemetery.

== Legacy ==
After Gabriel’s death, his photographs were stored and largely forgotten until the 1950s. As Gundagai assumed an increasingly prominent place in Australian cultural history, selections of his images began appearing in local historical booklets. In the 1970s the collection (then held by Cliff Butcher and Oscar Bell) was donated to the National Library of Australia. A small museum in Gundagai is also dedicated to his work.

The National Library’s publication of The Gundagai Album in 1978 renewed interest in Gabriel’s photography. Reviewers noted the distinctive qualities of his images, including their careful arrangement of subjects, their documentary precision, likely informed by his medical background, and his characteristic use of wide-angle perspectives and the photographer’s own shadow. These elements contributed to the particular visual tone of his work.

In 1991, after renewed interest in his photography, fellow artist Tom Bass was interviewed about his recollection on Gabriel. The recording can be found at the National Library of Australia.

His photography later featured in several television programs, in an entry in the Bicentennial Biography, and in various publications. In 2007 the novel Belonging, by G. McDougall, drew on Gabriel’s life and incorporated his photographs into the narrative.
