= Sheahan Bridge =

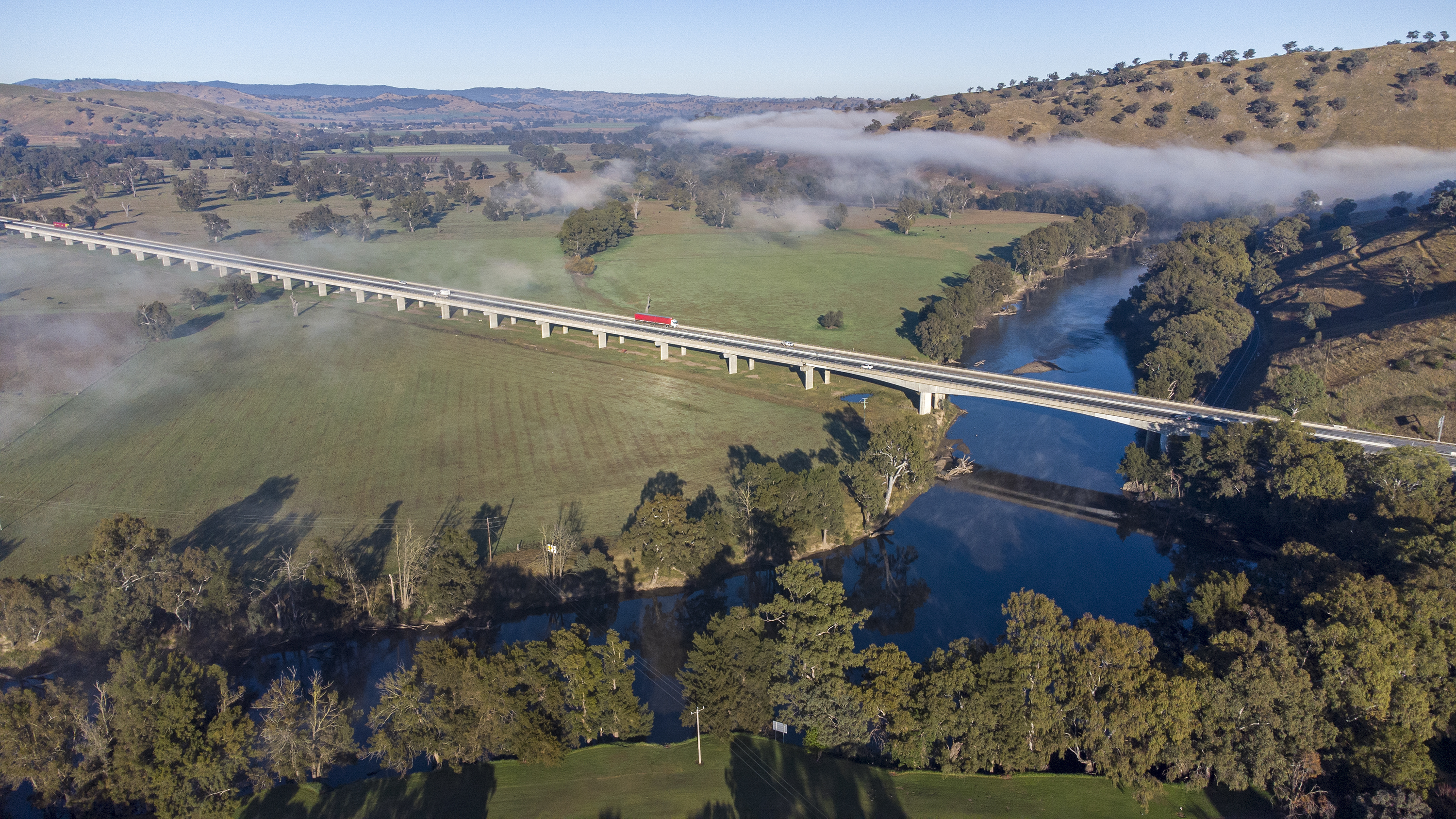
- Aerial view of Sheahan Bridge in May 2021, with the original bridge furthest from the camera
- Coordinates: 35°4′21.66020″S 148°5′41.34451″E
- Carries: Hume Highway
- Crosses: Murrumbidgee River
- Locale: Gundagai, New South Wales
- Named for: Bill Sheahan
- Owner: Transport for NSW

Characteristics
- Material: Steel, Concrete
- Total length: 1.14 kilometres (0.71 mi) (northbound bridge); 1.15 kilometres (0.71 mi) (southbound bridge)
- No. of spans: 27
- No. of lanes: 4

History
- Constructed by: Transbridge (northbound bridge); Fulton Hogan (southbound bridge)
- Opened: 25 March 1977 (northbound bridge); 25 May 2009 (southbound bridge)

Location
- Interactive map of Sheahan Bridge

Sheahan Bridge is a dual carriageway bridge over the Murrumbidgee River on the Hume Highway in Gundagai, New South Wales, Australia. It is the third longest bridge in New South Wales after the Macleay Valley Bridge and Sydney Harbour Bridge, which at 1.149 km (0.714 mi) is only slightly longer than the Sheahan Bridge's 1.141 km (0.709 mi).

== History ==
The now northbound bridge was built by Transbridge in 1977 to replace the Prince Alfred Bridge over the Murrumbidgee River and as part of a 7.4 km (4.6 mi) deviation of the Hume Highway built to bypass Gundagai. It was constructed using steel-box girder with a single lane of traffic in each direction. It was officially opened to traffic by the Premier of New South Wales, Neville Wran on 25 March 1977. The bridge was named after local politician Bill Sheahan, who had held the seat of Burrinjuck in the New South Wales Legislative Assembly. It has three spans over the main river channel and a further 24 south of the river, forming a viaduct over its flood-plain. At the time of completion, it was the second longest bridge in New South Wales and the longest bridge built by the Department of Main Roads.

The bridge was duplicated with a new bridge built immediately to the east of the existing structure by Fulton Hogan in 2008/09. The new bridge was officially opened to traffic by Minister for Infrastructure and Transport, Anthony Albanese on 25 May 2009. Duplication of the bridge had been planned since 1995. It initially carried traffic in both directions while the 1977 built bridge was refurbished. From December 2009, it carried southbound traffic only.

Prior to March 2021, road trains were unable to use the northbound bridge, due to the low design standards. They are now allowed to use the northbound bridge under permit.

In July 2026, it was announced that the northbound bridge will be replaced by a new bridge on the same alignment.
