= Yarri (Wiradjuri) =

Indigenous Australian lifesaver

Yarri (c. 1810 – 24 July 1880) also spelt Yarrie, Yarry, or Yarrar, was an Aboriginal Australian man of the Wiradjuri language group who, along with another Wiradjuri man, Jacky Jacky, took a major part in the rescue of 69 people from the flooded Murrumbidgee River in Gundagai over three days from the night of 25 June to 27 June 1852.

== Early life ==
Yarri, also spelt Yarrie, Yarry, or Yarrar, came from Brungle in the Gundagai Police District, His native name of Coonong Denamundinna indicates he was of the Rainbow Serpent pastoral properties near Tumblong and Adelong in New South Wales, which were also associated with the Coonong region downstream of Wagga Wagga in New South Wales.

== Stockman for the Stuckey family ==
In 1829, British pastoralist Peter Stuckey, with his brother Henry, were the first white men to appropriate land in Yarri's country around what is now the Gundagai region. As a young man, Yarri was trained by the Stuckeys to be a stockman and farmhand on their Willie Ploma property (the name being derived from the Wiradjuri wille blumma meaning possum island which is the area of land south of Gundagai between the river and Morleys Creek).

Yarri became a stockman, shepherd, horseman and bullock driver at Willie Ploma. He also was a proficient whip-maker, cobbler and farm worker. He fenced much of Stuckey's cattle paddocks and plowed, sowed and reaped Stuckey's wheat and vegetable fields. He was described as a very industrious and intelligent person.

== Frontier stockman on the Broken River ==
In 1840, he accompanied Peter Stuckey's son, Peter Stuckey Junior, and four other men to establish a cattle station in the uncolonised lands of the Taungurung people south of the Murray River. They formed a run with 500 cattle on the upper reaches of the Broken River around what is now the Barjarg region near Mansfield.

Conflict between Stuckey's men and the local Taungurung soon developed. A band of 15 Taungurung men led by Jackie Jackie and Winberri tried to lure the white men away from their guns with the prospect of having sex with boys, saying that plenty of white men located nearby on the recently colonised Goulburn River regularly had sex with boys. They also tried to lure Yarri away, enticing him to go possum hunting with them. The Taungurung men already had three guns and numerous spears in their possession and when their attempts to lure the colonists away failed, they shot at Stuckey Junior and a skirmish broke out. One of the Taungurungs, named "Andrew", was shot in the back, while Yarri was speared in the shoulder, the force of which knocked him into a creek. The Taungurungs retreated and Stuckey's men removed the spear from Yarri's shoulder, treated his wound, and eventually Yarri recovered.

== Return to the Gundagai region ==
Yarri evidently returned to the Gundagai region and is said to have saved the life of John Hargreaves at the time of the 1844 flooding in the area. His act earned him the friendship of the family and he lived on their property at Tarrabandra until his death. A number of stories circulate suggesting that Yarri is the same as the native of that name mentioned as being responsible for the death of John Baxter at Caiguna in Western Australia during the expedition made by Edward John Eyre in 1841. This identification would place Yarri a long way from his traditional lands. The association of the two goes back to newspaper reports at the time. In the same year as the flood, the Brungle aboriginal community is said to have blamed him for the death of a part Aboriginal woman, Sally McLeod, much closer to his home area, near Gundagai in 1852. Warrants were made for his arrest. Yarri's wife was known by the name of Black Sally, and that Sally is said to have died on walkabout in March 1873.

Yarri is said to have also worked at Nangus station as a shepherd. The Indigenous population of the area were numerous: according to an 1851 estimate, which classified them generically as belonging to the Tumut tribe, they consisted of 35 groups.

== Rescuer during the 1852 Gundagai flood ==
The Murrumbidgee, whose name is said to derive from an Wiradjuri word morunbeedja, warning of 'big water', had inundated the area on several occasions in the past, in 1844, and August 1851. Old Aboriginals had cautioned people building in the district of its dangers, recounting that in earlier times, water had risen so high that it covered the tops of large gum trees.

In the flood at Gundagai, New South Wales on 25 June 1852, 48 houses in North Gundagai were washed away and the overflow killed a large number of local white people, with estimates varying from 81 to almost 100, (Note: "The Burial Registers of the Anglican Church of Yass recorded the burials of 73 Anglicans, and according to an Anglican clergyman, Rev C. F. Brigstocke, eight Catholics also drowned. Lachlan Ross, an eyewitness, noted that almost 100 people perished." (Soerjohardjo 2012, p. 121)) out of the town's population of 397, (Note: "The statistical record indicates that the population in 1851 was 397 in the town and 1019 in the rural districts." (Soerjohardjo 2012, p. 120)) (Note: The 1851 census indicates the population of North Gundagai was 233 and South Gundagai 75 (O'Gorman 2012, p. 38)) of whom 49 were rescued by aboriginals. The event itself became one of the largest natural disasters in Australia's history. Local Aboriginal men, Yarri and Jackey Jackey between them were credited with having saved approximately 28 people, though contemporary reports assert that Jackey was responsible for some 20 of these. The difference between the two may stem from the fact that Jackey had the use of a boat, capable of holding 8 people, whereas Yarri's rescue efforts were conducted with a frail native bark canoe that could only carry two. Others were rescued by Long Jimmy and Tommy Davis.

== Recognition ==
Though poems and stories were published at the time celebrating the heroic efforts of the aborigines in rescuing whites, public recognition in terms of a material reward was slow in coming. It was only in 1875, by which time Jackey had died, that it was announced that the native rescuers were entitled to collect sixpence from settlers. Yarri, Jackey Jackey and Tommy Davis were honoured with bronze breastplates for their efforts, and were allowed to demand sixpences from all Gundagai residents, although Yarri was maltreated on at least one occasion after the flood. (Note: 'A gentleman, who passed through South Gundagai on Monday, complains that he saw some individuals whom, he supposes, would expect to be considered men, maltreating and teasing an unfortunate blackfellow, whom he subsequently ascertained was Old Yarri. He reminds us that this blackfellow was instrumental in saving the lives of many white people in the disastrous flood of 1852, and that the only thanks he received was to be kicked around by a lot of white rascals. Through the passing of time we have come to respect the Aboriginal people of this land and we hope for the future that Australia will be as one.' Gundagai Times 29 June 1879 (Asimus 2003),) Long Jimmy died not long after his rescues, possibly from the effects of being exposed to the freezing cold and wet conditions. The rescue effort and reward to Tommy Davis are recorded in an old Gundagai Independent newspaper.

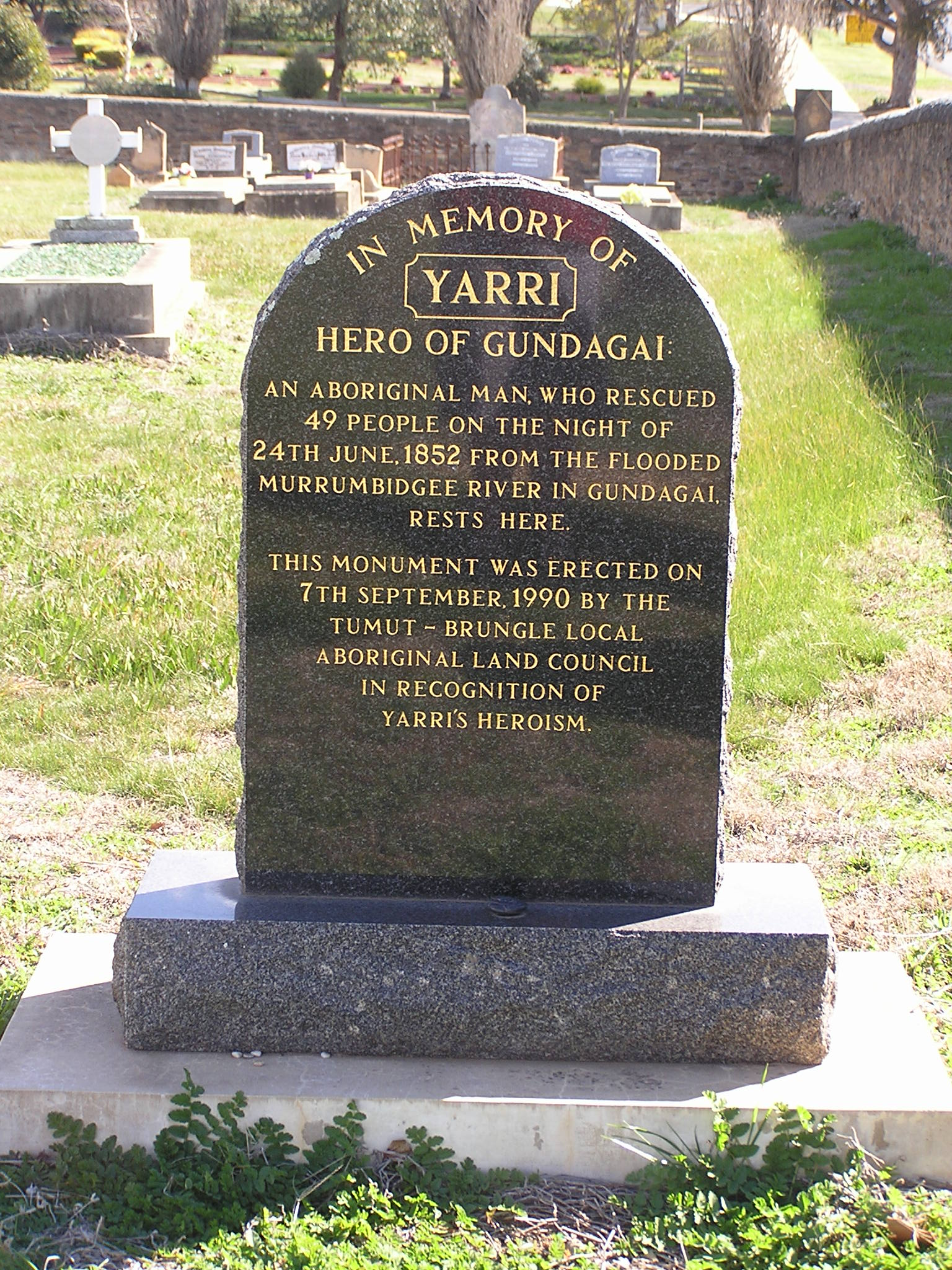
Memorial to Yarri in the Gundagai cemetery

A nulla-nulla and shield believed to belong to Yarri, was presented to the Gundagai Historical Society by John Hargreaves' grandson Dallas.

Yarri suffered from an aneurysm, but refused to be transported to Sydney for treatment, and crept out of the hospital in April to return to his dwelling, preferring to die in the area he belonged to at Gundagai. (Note: "The love of the aboriginal for his native locality is strongly exemplified in the following story, which is taken from the Gundagai Times of April 2:' Poor old Yarry whose name is associated with the great Gundagai flood of 1852, was one day last week admitted into the hospital, suffering from aneurysm in the leg. When it was proposed that he should go to the Sydney Infirmary, he began to cry, saying that he ' b'long Gundagai,' and would not go. He made a similar reply to an invitation a few weeks ago from the Rev. J. B. Gribble, superintendent of the Aboriginal Mission Station, at Darlington Point, observing that he was well cared for here,' had plenty tucker, and bed,' and would rather die ' along o' Gundagai.' Anticipating the probability of his removing to Sydney or elsewhere, he, on Wednesday morning, at dawn of day managed to crawl away from, the hospital to his old quarters at South Gundagai, where he now is, and where he must soon end his days.'." (Miscellaneous 1880)) He subsequently died on 24 July 1880 and is buried in the Catholic Section of the North Gundagai General Cemetery.

== Memorials ==
There are several tributes to Yarri in the Gundagai area including a town memorial, sundial, marble plaque and black marble headstone. A mural painted around the walls of the lounge bar in the Criterion Hotel in Gundagai depicts the scene. Yarri Park, a recreation area below the main street in Gundagai, commemorates his feat, and a sundial was erected in his honour by descendants of Fred Horsley, one of the people he saved.

In 2017 a Gundagai community committee, including members of the Wiradjuri community and descendants of those saved by Yarri and Jacky Jacky, erected a bronze sculpture in Sheridan Street, Gundagai entitled "The Great Rescue of 1852" in honour of the Wiradjuri heroes.

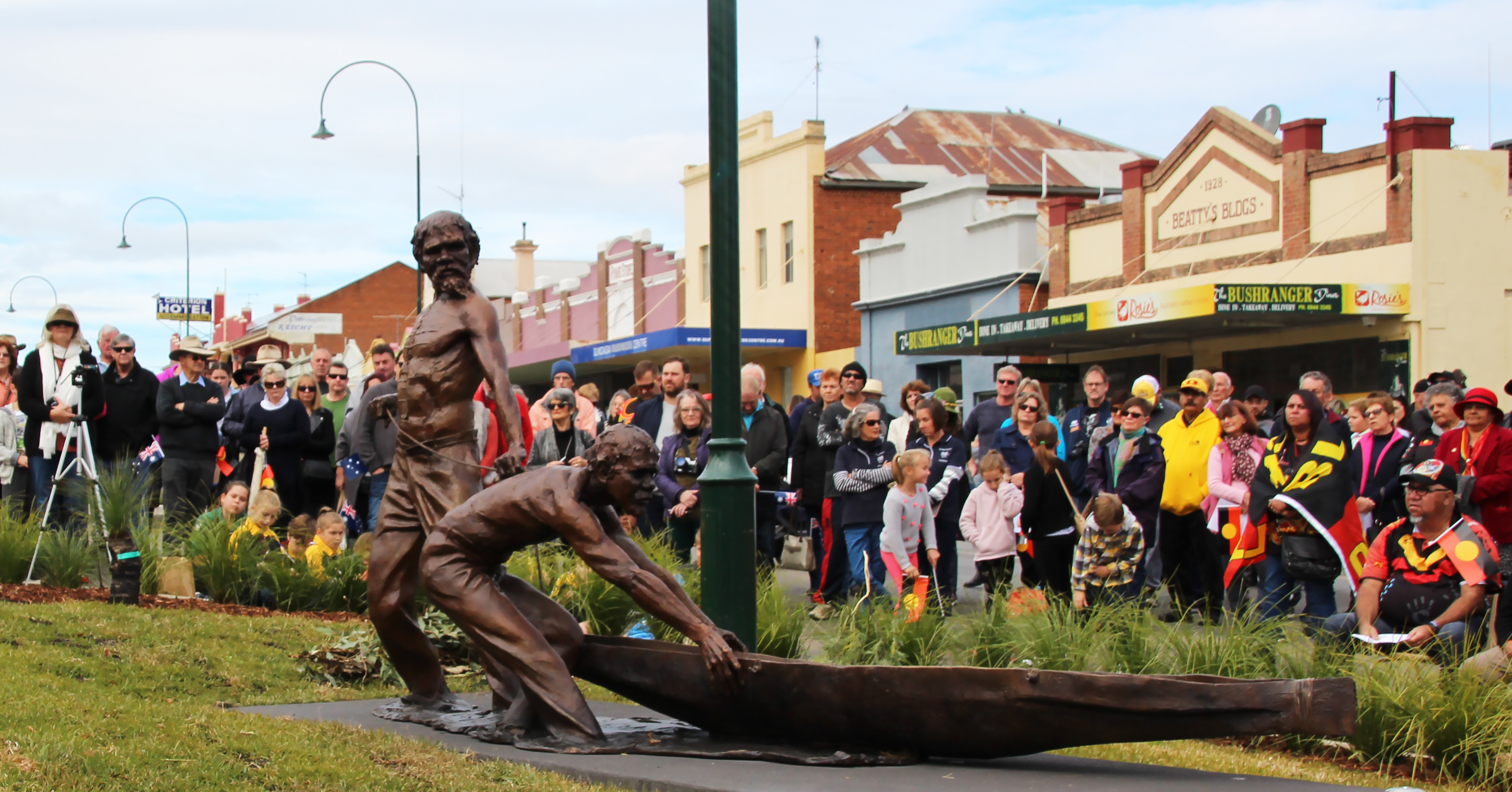
The Great Rescue of 1852 Unveiling 10 June 2017

John Warner has composed a Song & Verse Cycle titled Yarri of Wiradjuri.

== See also ==
- List of Indigenous Australian historical figures

== Sources ==
- Asimus, Bodie (2003). "Yarri - A Frontier Story". Lateline. Archived from the original on 2 November 2019.
- Carr, Bob, Premier Minister for the Arts, and Minister for Citizenship (25 June 2002). "Gundagai Flood Sesquicentenary". Parliamentary Debates (Hansard). Parliament of New South Wales: Legislative Assembly.
- "Great Flood of June 1852". Monument Australia.
- "The Great Rescue of 1852". Monument Australia.
- "Gundagai". The Sydney Morning Herald. 8 February 2004.
- "How an Aborigine Saved Our Australian Branch Was He Yarri?". Alvyray.com. 2002.
- Kabaila, Peter Rimas (1999). Archaeological Aspects Of Aboriginal Settlement of The Period 1870-1970 In The Wiradjuri Region (PhD). Australian National University.
- "Miscellaneous items: An Aboriginal's Love for his Native Place". The Maitland Mercury and Hunter River General Advertiser. 1880. p. 2 – via Trove.
- O'Gorman, Emily (2012). Flood Country: An Environmental History of the Murray-Darling Basin. Csiro Publishing. ISBN 978-0-643-10158-6.
- "An Old Relic: The '52 Gundagai Flood". The Gundagai Independent and Pastoral, Agricultural and Mining Advocate. 27 March 1912. p. 4 – via Trove.
- Soerjohardjo, Wardiningsih (2012). "Remembering Yarrie: An Indigenous Australian and the 1852 Gundagai Flood". Public History Review. 19: 120–129. doi:10.5130/phrj.v19i0.3096.
- Veitch, Mick (7 March 2018). "Murrumbidgee River Flooding Posthumous Bravery Awards". Parliamentary Debates (Hansard). Parliament of New South Wales: Legislative Council.
- Warner, John. Yarri of Wiradjuri: A Song & Verse Cycle.
