= Murrumbidgee River railway bridge, Gundagai =

Railway bridge in New South Wales, Australia

Murrumbidgee River railway bridge
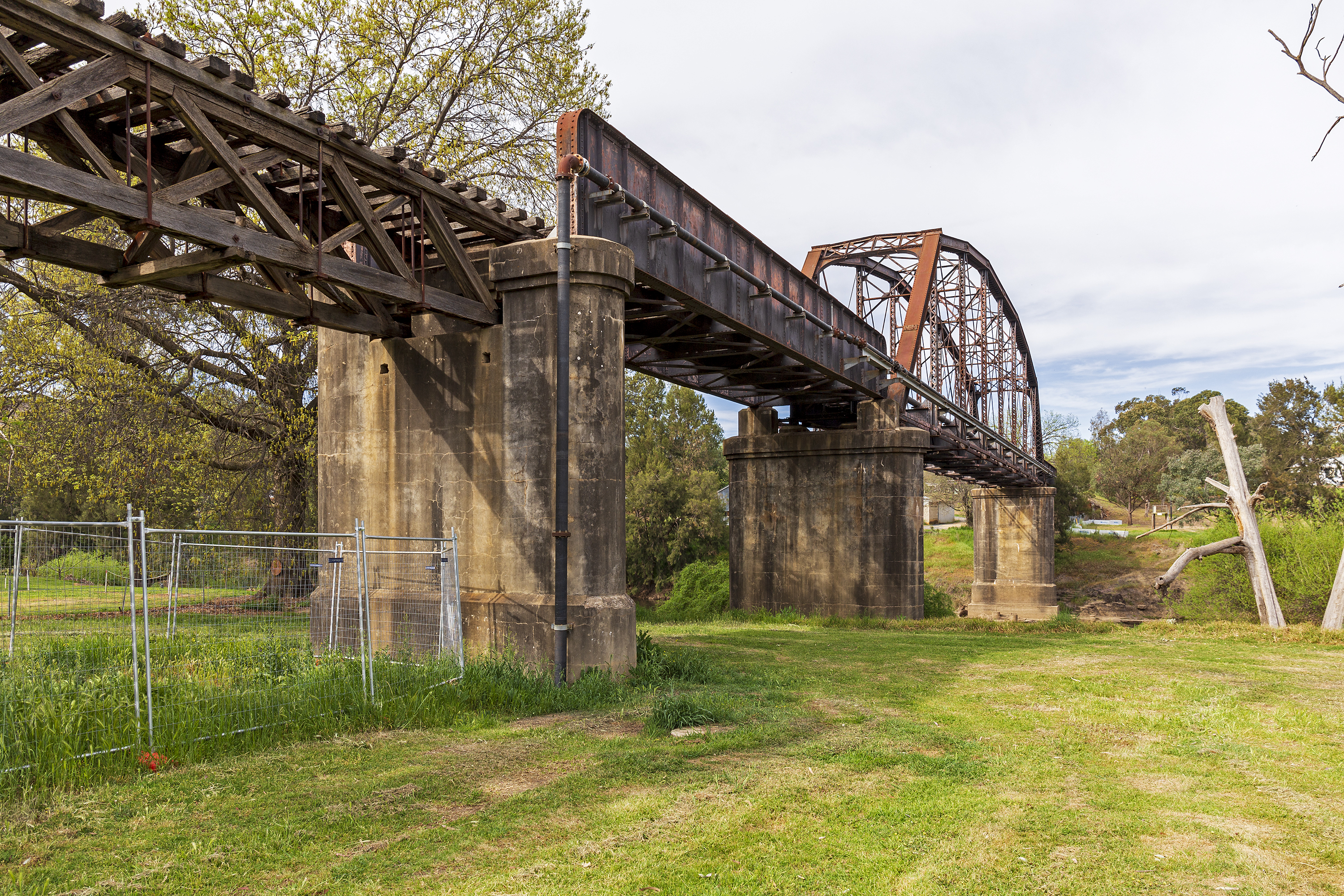
- Disused railway bridge in October 2019
- Coordinates: 35°04′24″S 148°06′16″E
- Carries: Cootamundra–Tumut railway
- Crosses: Murrumbidgee River
- Locale: Gundagai, Cootamundra-Gundagai Regional Council, New South Wales, Australia
- Owner: Transport Asset Manager of New South Wales
- Heritage status: NSW SHR
- ID number: 01039

Characteristics
- Material: Timber and Steel
- Total length: 3,033 feet (924.5 m)
- Longest span: 200 feet (61.0 m)
- No. of spans: 1 + 2 + 77
- Piers in water: 2 + 4

Rail characteristics
- No. of tracks: 1
- Track gauge: 4 ft 8 1/2 in (1,435 mm) standard gauge

History
- Contracted lead designer: NSW Government Railways
- Constructed by: NSW Public Works Department
- Fabrication by: American Bridge Company; Messrs. J. Barrs Johnstone & Co
- Construction end: 1903

New South Wales Heritage Register
- Official name: Gundagai rail bridge over Murrumbidgee River; Murrumbidgee River Railway Bridge; Gundagai
- Type: State heritage (built)
- Designated: 2 April 1999
- Reference no.: 01039
- Type: Railway Bridge/Viaduct
- Category: Transport – Rail
- Builders: Day labour

Location
- Interactive map of Murrumbidgee River railway bridge

The Murrumbidgee River railway bridge is a heritage-listed railway bridge across the Murrumbidgee River located on the Tumut railway line at Gundagai in the Cootamundra-Gundagai Regional Council local government area of New South Wales, Australia. It was built in 1903. It is also known as the Gundagai Rail Bridge over Murrumbidgee River and the Murrumbidgee River Railway Bridge. The property was added to the New South Wales State Heritage Register on 2 April 1999.

== History ==
During the era of John Whitton as Engineer-in-Chief of the New South Wales Government Railways, there was a government edict for railway construction to use as much local materials as possible instead of expensive imported iron bridges. Whitton used stone arches and some brick arches but mostly timber in the form of laminated arches, timber beam bridges and timber trusses.

His successor was his Deputy, Henry Deane who, following a visit to the United States of America instigated a policy of cheaper railway construction known as Pioneer Lines beginning in the late 1890s. Most inland rivers were crossed by a new series of timber trusses based on the American Howe truss. Only under special circumstances were steel trusses used.

There were two types of timber trusses, the large span 62 feet through trusses and the shorter 35–40 feet deck trusses. Upgrading replacements have reduced the survivors to 3 sites with through trusses and 5 sites with deck trusses. All but one are on lines that have suspended traffic.

At Gundagai there is a mix of both bridge policies. The main channel of the Murrumbidgee River had to be crossed by a high level major steel truss bridge but, in order to contain railway construction costs, the long, high level viaduct across the flood plain was built from timber in the form of 77 deck trusses on timber trestles.

It is timber bridge construction on a grand scale.

The total crossing had to be built first so as to provide access to South Gundagai and the railway construction beyond to Tumut.

The line across the bridge and on to Tumut opened on 12 October 1903, with the first train travelling across on 3 December 1903. The last train travelled across the bridge on 26 November 1983 and the line was formally closed in March 1985 following flood damage to the line on two occasions.

In 2017, a local community group, Gundagai Historic Bridge Incorporated, expressed concern about the future of the decaying bridge and launched a campaign to save the bridge and have it converted into a rail trail. A spokesperson for John Holland Rail told The Daily Advertiser at that time: "No decision has been made, however we are considering a number of options which may include modifications or the removal of spans over public roadways."

A report in May 2018 commissioned by the Cootamundra-Gundagai Regional Council estimated that the cost of rehabilitating the timber viaducts would be $13,660,000, with a cost of a further $5,955,000 to install a shared path decking system to facilitate pedestrian use.

== Description ==
The Gundagai Rail Bridge over Murrumbidgee River is a 77-span timber deck truss, 11–12-metre (35–40 ft) spans, on tall timber trestles. As at February 2018, the bridge was unsafe to cross due to decayed, loose and/or unstable timbers. There are safety barriers at both ends of the bridge to prevent pedestrian access. It was assumed to have not had any maintenance since 1984. A report at that time described the condition of the timber viaducts as varying from poor to fair condition, and the steel spans in fair to good condition. The structure retains its original fabric.

== Heritage listing ==
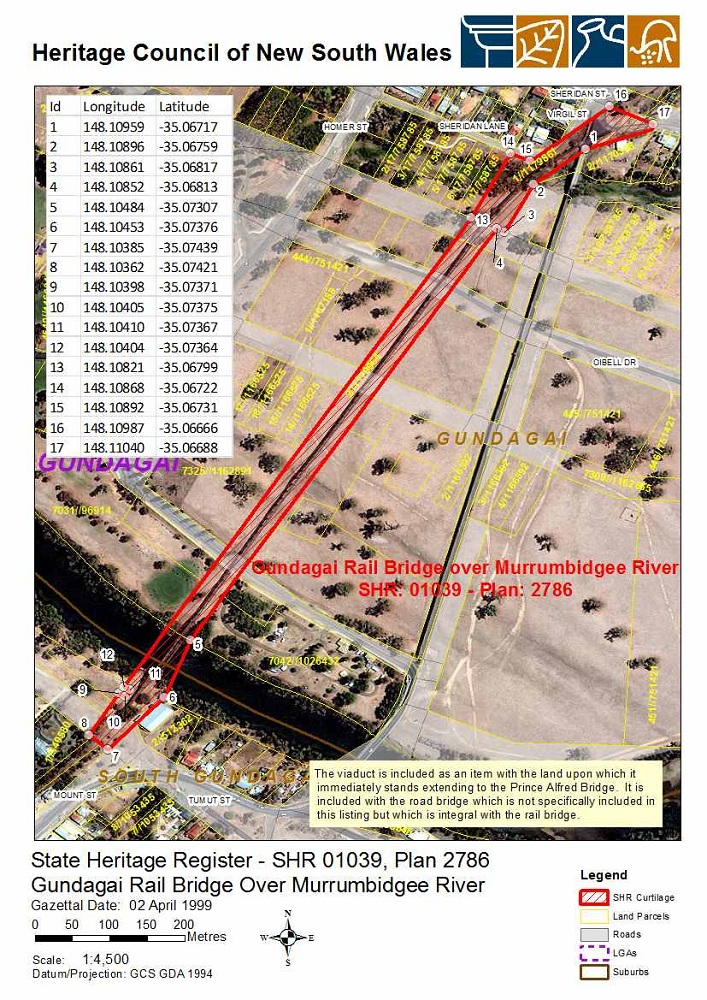
Heritage boundaries

Gundagai is a major crossing of the Murrumbidgee River by the Hume Highway to Victoria, and the Tumut branch railway. The railway reached the town in 1886.

Gundagai includes a group of buildings and structures built in the late 1880s, including a station, yard, and early timber road and rail viaducts. The timber viaducts represent an early engineering solution to crossing a major floodplain, and the site is listed on the Register of the National Estate.

This viaduct is an example of timber bridge construction on a grand scale. A multi-span, high level viaduct of timber deck trusses and timber trestles, it is one of the most impressive structures in Australia. It dominates the crossing of the Murrumbidgee flood plain more so than the adjacent low level timber beam road viaduct. Its combination with the steel truss over the river makes for a unique technical juxtaposition of bridge types.

Gundagai rail bridge over Murrumbidgee River was listed on the New South Wales State Heritage Register on 2 April 1999 having satisfied the following criteria.

The place is important in demonstrating the course, or pattern, of cultural or natural history in New South Wales.

The Gundagai-Tumut Railway was one of the early branch lines built cheaply as a developmental railway. It was not sufficiently profitable to justify upgrading despite the heavy cost of crossing the Murrumbidgee River.

The place is important in demonstrating aesthetic characteristics and/or a high degree of creative or technical achievement in New South Wales.

A high level structure on timber trestles, it one of the most imposing bridge structures in Australia.

The place has a strong or special association with a particular community or cultural group in New South Wales for social, cultural or spiritual reasons.

The Murrumbidgee railway crossing was essential to the social and commercial development of the district south of the river.

Since the closing of rail services, the historic features of the railway have been successfully promoted such that the railway crossing is now a prominent tourist attraction.

The place has potential to yield information that will contribute to an understanding of the cultural or natural history of New South Wales.

The Murrumbidgee flood plain crossing at Gundagai was the largest application of the new type of timber deck truss bridge spans.

The place possesses uncommon, rare or endangered aspects of the cultural or natural history of New South Wales.

There are only five sites with timber Howe deck trusses.

The place is important in demonstrating the principal characteristics of a class of cultural or natural places/environments in New South Wales.

It is a spectacular representative example of a timber Howe deck truss.

== Engineering heritage award ==
The bridge received a Historic Engineering Marker from Engineers Australia as part of its Engineering Heritage Recognition Program.

== See also ==
- List of railway bridges in New South Wales
