= 2025 Snowy Valleys Council de-amalgamation referendum =

- 29 November 2025
- Should the Snowy Valleys Council be de-amalgamated and the former Tumut Shire and Tumbarumba Shire Councils be re-constituted as separate local government areas?
- Outcome: Passed

Results
Choice	Votes	%
Yes	7,917	87.28%
No	1,154	12.72%
Valid votes	9,071	99.33%
Invalid or blank votes	61	0.67%
Total votes	9,132	100.00%
Registered voters/turnout	10,396	87.84%

The 2025 Snowy Valleys Council de-amalgamation referendum was held on 29 November 2025 to vote on a proposal to de-amalgamate the Snowy Valleys Council in New South Wales, Australia and return to the former Tumbarumba Shire and Tumut Shire local government areas (LGAs) that were involuntarily merged in 2016.

The referendum required a majority of all 10,396 registered voters to pass, rather than just a majority among those who turn out to vote.

The final count resulted in an overwhelming majority in favour of de-amalgamation, easily passing the 5,199 threshold on the first day of counting alone, and a final yes result of 87.3% of the vote and 76.2% of all registered voters.

== Background ==
=== Amalgamation ===
In 2016 the Baird Government, under Minister for Local Government Paul Toole, implemented a policy of forced amalgamations as a supposed solution to many regional LGA's financial problems. 152 regional LGAs were reduced to 112. This included Tumut Shire and Tumbarumba Shire which were involuntarily amalgamated into Snowy Valleys Council.

The amalgamation was strongly contested, with the local group Save Tumbarumba Shire lobbying to prevent the amalgamation from going ahead.

In 2021, then-MLC David Shoebridge of The Greens successfully moved a motion calling on the government to end uncertainty around Snowy Valley Council's future, de-amalgamate the council, and bear the costs of that de-amalgamation. This was passed in conjunction with a duplicate motion by MLC Rod Roberts, then of Pauline Hanson's One Nation, relating to Cootamundra–Gundagai Regional Council.

=== Previous de-amalgamation proposal ===
In 2020, Snowy Valleys Council put forward a formal de-amalgamation proposal. In 2021 that proposal was rejected by the then Minister for Local Government Shelley Hancock despite a report by the state's Boundaries Commission, commissioned by Hancock, endorsing a demerger.

=== Change of government ===
At the 2023 New South Wales state election, Labor took a policy of allowing for LGAs involuntarily merged in 2016 to attempt de-amalgamation to the election. After the election, Labor formed government and Ron Hoenig became minister for local government.

In May 2023, a new independent business case was commissioned by Snowy Valleys Council and undertaken by Professor Joseph Drew of the University of Newcastle.

In May 2025, legislation establishing a new framework for de-amalgamation came into effect.

== Key dates ==
This is a list of key electoral dates:

- Close of roll — 20 October 2025
- Postal vote applications open — 21 October 2025
- Postal vote package distribution begins — 3 November 2025
- Pre-poll voting opens — 22 November 2025
- Telephone assisted voting applications and voting open (Note: Telephone assisted voting is available for those with low vision or blindness and typically runs 8:30am to 5:30pm during the pre-poll period and 8am to 1pm on Referendum Day.) — 22 November 2025
- Telephone assisted voting applications close — 29 November 2025; 6pm
- Referendum day — 29 November 2025; 8am – 6pm
- Telephone assisted voting closes — 29 November 2025; 6pm
- Postal vote returns close — 12 December 2025; 6pm
- Count completed — 15 December 2025
- Results declared — 16 December 2025

== Polling places ==
Electors were able cast their votes at the following places on polling day:

- Adelong Services and Citizens Club
- Batlow Literary Institute Hall
- Khancoban Community Hall
- Rosewood Public School
- Talbingo Public School
- Tumbarumba RSL Memorial Hall (also open for pre-poll)
- Tumut CWA Hall (also open for pre-poll)
- Tumut High School

== Positions ==
=== Yes ===
List of Yes endorsements
- Snowy Valleys Referendum, the primary Yes campaign

Politicians

- Joe McGirr, MP for Wagga Wagga in the New South Wales Legislative Assembly (independent)
- James Hayes, Snowy Valleys councillor
- Trina Thomson, Snowy Valleys councillor
- Rick Firman, current member of the NSW Local Government Boundaries Commission and former councillor and mayor of Tumut Shire
- Tony a'Beckett, former Tumbarumba councillor (Liberal Party member)
- Ian Chaffey, former councillor and Mayor of Snowy Valleys Council
- Julie Giddings McDonell, former Tumbarumba councillor

Community Groups

- Tumbarumba Men's Shed
- Tumbarumba Archive Group

Businesses

- Goldspink Automotive

=== No ===
List of No endorsements

Politicians

- Andrew Wortes, Independent councillor

=== Neutral ===
List of explicitly neutral positions

Politicians

- Ron Hoenig, New South Wales Minister for Local Government (Note: Hoenig declined to endorse a position on the referendum, saying "it's Snowy Valleys' vote", but said that if the referendum returned a "yes" vote he would ensure that the de-amalgamation goes ahead, as it is technically still at his discretion whether or not to proceed.)

=== Other ===
List of other positions
- Riverina Greens (encouraged all SVG residents to vote and stated that a majority of members support the Yes vote)

=== Unclear ===
List of relevant perspectives which have are currently unclear

Politicians

- Justin Clancy, MP for Albury in the New South Wales Legislative Assembly (Liberal)
- Michael McCormack, MP for Riverina in the Australian House of Representatives (National)
- Kristy McBain, federal Minister for Regional Development, Local Government and Territories (Labor)

Councillors

- Grant Hardwick, Independent councillor
- Julia Ham, Independent Liberal councillor and Mayor
- John Larter, Libertarian councillor
- David Sheldon, Independent Labor councillor
- Michael Inglis, Independent councillor
- Hugh Packard, Independent councillor and Deputy Mayor

== Results ==
=== By polling place ===
Polling place	Yes		No		Formal		Informal		Turnout	
Polling place	Votes	%	Votes	%	Votes	%	Votes	%	Total	%
Tumbarumba pre-poll	1,176	96.6	41	3.4	1,217	99.9	1	0.1	1,218	
Tumut pre-poll	3,381	84.5	616	15.4	3,997	99.0	40	1.0	4,037	
Adelong	428	86.5	67	13.5	495	99.0	5	1.0	500	
Batlow	408	89.7	47	10.3	455	98.7	6	1.3	461	
Khancoban	171	88.1	23	11.9	194	99.5	1	0.5	195	
Rosewood	94	100.0	0	0.0	94	100.0	0	0.0	94	
Talbingo	51	81.0	12	19.0	63	100.0	0	0.0	63	
Tumbarumba	335	94.9	18	5.1	3,353	100.0	0	0.0	353	
Tumut	778	84.8	139	15.2	917	99.5	5	0.5	922	
Tumut HS	211	82.7	44	17.3	255	99.2	2	0.8	257	
Declared Institution	71	91.0	7	9.0	78	100.0	0	0.0	78	
Enrolment/Provisional	92	91.1	9	8.9	101	100.0	0	0.0	101	
Postal	721	84.6	131	15.4	852	99.9	1	0.1	853	

== Aftermath ==
If the referendum succeeds, Snowy Valleys will be the second New South Wales LGA involuntarily amalgamated in 2016 to de-amalgamate, following Cootamundra–Gundagai Regional Council who received the go-ahead in July 2025 when it was announced that it would return to Cootamundra Shire and Gundagai Shire.

A $5 million grant from the NSW Government will be available to Snowy Valleys Council to cover the cost of the de-amalgamation process if it goes ahead, however this is to be given at the Minister's discretion and Hoenig has said he will make his decision after hearing business cases prepared by Council.

According to SVC Mayor Cr. Julia Ham, the two new shires are planned to be declared by the Governor on 1 July 2027 with the current councillors to be appointed as administrators.
