= Tumut Shire =

Former local government area in New South Wales, Australia

- Local government area
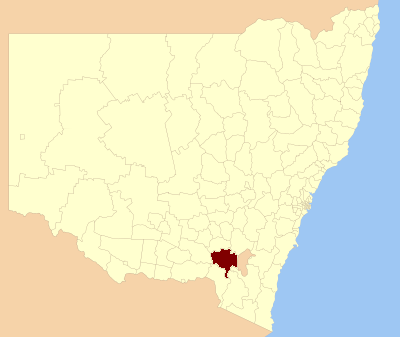
- Location in New South Wales
- Coordinates: 35°18′S 148°13′E
- Country: Australia
- State: New South Wales
- Region: South West Slopes
- Established: 1928
- Abolished: 12 May 2016
- Council seat: Tumut

Government
  - Mayor: Sue Bulger
  - State electorate: Wagga Wagga
  - Federal division: Riverina

Area
  - Total: 4,566 km^{2} (1,763 sq mi)

Population
  - Total: 11,316 (2013 est)
  - Density: 2.4783/km^{2} (6.4188/sq mi)
- Website: Tumut Shire
LGAs around Tumut Shire
| Gundagai | Harden | Yass Valley |
| Wagga Wagga | Tumut Shire | Australian Capital Territory |
| Greater Hume | Tumbarumba | Cooma-Monaro |

Tumut Shire (/ˈtjuːmət/) was a local government area in the South West Slopes region of New South Wales, Australia.

Tumut Shire was established in 1928 by the amalgamation of the Municipality of Tumut with the surrounding Gadara Shire.

A 2015 review of local government boundaries recommended that the Tumut Shire merge with the Tumbarumba Shire to form a new council with an area of 8,960 square kilometres (3,460 sq mi) and support a population of approximately 14,953. On 12 May 2016, the Tumut Shire merged with the Tumbarumba Shire to form the Snowy Valleys Council.

The last mayor of Tumut Shire was Sue Bulger, an independent politician.

== Towns and localities ==
The former Shire included the town of Tumut and the small towns of Gilmore, Adelong, Grahamstown, Gocup, Brungle, Talbingo, Wondalga, Batlow, Killimicat and Cabramurra.

== Council ==
=== Current composition and election method ===
Prior to its dissolution, the Tumut Shire Council was composed of seven councillors elected proportionally as one entire ward. All councillors are elected for a fixed four-year term of office. The mayor was elected by the councillors at the first meeting of the council. The most recent election was held on 8 September 2012, and the makeup of the former council was as follows:

| Party | Councillors |
|---|---|
| Independents and Unaligned | 7 |
| Total | 7 |

The last Council, elected in 2012 and dissolved in 2016, in order of election, was:

| Councillor | Party | Notes |
|---|---|---|
| Trina Thomson | Independent | Mayor |
| Scott Stevenson | Independent | |
| James Hayes | Independent | |
| Sue Bulger | Unaligned | |
| Peter Cross | Independent | |
| Margaret Isselmann | Unaligned | |
| Geoff Pritchard | Independent | |
