= Heather Reid (sports administrator) =

Australian sports administrator

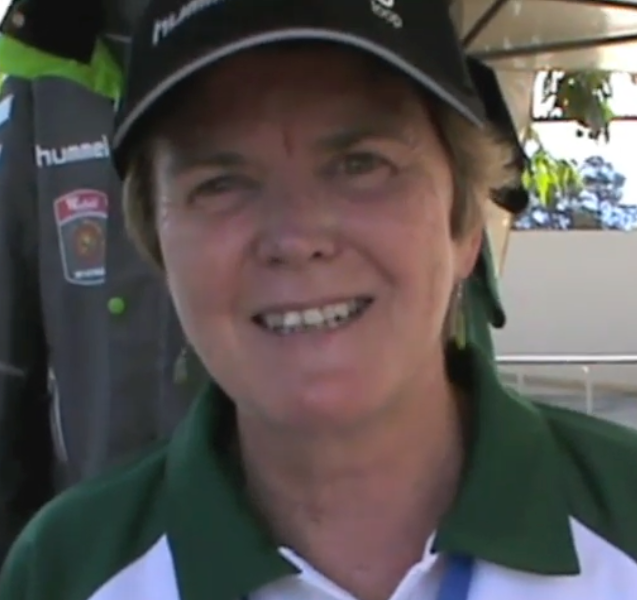
- In a 2012 interview
- Born: Goulburn, New South Wales, Australia
- Occupation: Football administrator

Heather Lynne Reid AM is a former Australian football administrator and an advocate for gender equity, diversity and inclusion in sport, particularly in the world game of football. From 2018 to 2021, she was a member of the Football Australia Board.

== Personal ==
Reid was born in Goulburn, New South Wales in 1956. Her parents emigrated from Edinburgh, Scotland to Australia in 1955 with her elder brother and sister. She grew up in Cooma, Khancoban and Talbingo due to her Scottish father working on the Snowy Mountains Scheme. Reid attended Tumut High School where she was school captain in 1973. In 1974, she moved to Canberra to undertake a secretarial course at the TAFE college. In 1980, Reid commenced a bachelor of sports administration degree at the Canberra College of Advanced Education (now University of Canberra). She was one of the inaugural graduates of the course that started due to the establishment of the Australian Institute of Sport in 1981. After completing the sports administration degree in 1983, Reid was employed as CEO of ACT Touch Football.

Reid returned to the University of Canberra as a lecturer in sport management in 1999 and continued to convene and deliver undergraduate and graduate units through to 2004. She completed a Graduate Diploma in Sports Management at University of Canberra in 2007 and in 2012 completed the Australian Institute of Company Directors program. In 2015, Reid was awarded an Honorary Doctorate from the University of Canberra.

== Football ==
While working at the Australian National University, Reid was involved in forming the ANU Women's Soccer Club in 1978 and then the ACT Women's Soccer Association in 1979 which was a member of the Australian Women's Soccer Association. Whilst involved in the ACT Association, Reid held several positions, including President, and she pioneered improvements to the administration and promotion of women's football competitions as well as established state representative teams and coached the first ACT Under 15 team in 1983. Reid began her career as a paid football administrator in 1986 when appointed National Executive Director of Australian Women's Soccer Association. She held this position until 1992. Whilst in this position, Reid was part of an informal international alliance that lobbied for the establishment of a FIFA women's world cup and soon after lobbied for the inclusion of a soccer competition for women in the Olympic Games.

During the late 1990s Reid maintained a voluntary and coaching role in community football and then returned to professional football administration in 2004 when she was the first woman appointed as CEO of a State football federation, at the ACT Football Federation (Capital Football). While CEO of Capital Football she played a major role in developing new participation and player development programs, promoting the Kanga Cup as a world leading international youth football tournament and obtaining the licence for Canberra United FC in 2008 to compete in the Westfield W-League.

In 2013, Reid was appointed to the Local Organising Committee of the 2015 AFC Asian Cup with games played in Canberra, Sydney, Newcastle, Brisbane and Melbourne. Reid retired as CEO Capital Football in 2016. In November 2016, Reid won a defamation case against Stan Dukic who wrote Facebook posts over a two-year period alleging she was incompetent and had misappropriated money.

Reid was appointed as a mentor on FIFA's women's leadership program and an administration instructor in 2016. In November 2018, she was elected to the Football Federation of Australia (FFA) Board with over 90 per cent of ballots cast in her favour. In January 2019, Reid took indefinite leave as FFA Vice-President whilst undergoing chemotherapy treatment.

In May 2019 Reid apologised "unreservedly" to Alen Stajcic for comments she made to journalists in the aftermath of his sudden dismissal as head coach of the Australia women's national soccer team the previous January. Reid had incorrectly implied that Stajcic had been sacked for misconduct, but apologised when the FFA distanced itself from her remarks.

In February 2021, Reid was voted off the Football Australia Board following an extraordinary general meeting following allegations of interfering with the election of another Board member.

== Women's sport ==
Reid has been a strong advocate for gender equity, women in sport and mentoring. She has held various volunteer roles as well as the following professional positions: Director and CEO of the ACT Association for Women in Sport and Recreation (1990-1993) and National Executive Director of Womensport Australia (1994-1998). She wrote a guide for facilitating mentoring relationships and subsequently delivered Mentor as Anything programs across Australia. Reid was a consultant and project officer at the Australian Sports Commission between 1999 and 2003 working on strategies and programs related to women in sport, ethics, harassment free sport, Play by the Rules and Active Australia. Reid was a member and chair of the ACT Advisory Council on Women and Sport (2003-2008) and was a member of the ACT Sport and Recreation Council (2008-2012).

In 2020 she and Marion Stell co-wrote Women in Boots: Football and Feminism in the 1970s. Since 2021, Reid has been a Director on the Board of Women Onside.

== Honours ==
- 1986 – Life Member, ACT Women's Soccer Association
- 1998 – Life Member, Womensport and Recreation ACT
- 2000 – ACT Sport Star of the Year in the administrator category
- 2001 – Australian Sports Medal
- 2003 – ACT Women's Soccer, Cathy McCallum Award for outstanding contribution
- 2004 – Life Member, ACT Football Federation
- 2006 – Australian Sports Commission's Margaret Pewtress Memorial Award for her contribution to women in sport
- 2007 – Inducted into the Australian Football Federation Hall of Fame
- 2013 – Awarded the 'Edna Award' for her work in women's sport and football and appointed Ambassador for Australian Womensport and Recreation Association (AWRA)
- 2014 – ACT Honour Walk Recipient
- 2015 – Member of the Order of Australia for significant service to sport administration, particularly football, in the Canberra region, and as an advocate for gender equity in sport
- 2017 – Honorary doctorate from the University of Canberra for distinguished service to sport administration, football and as an advocate for gender equality
- 2022 - Inaugural inductee to University of Canberra Sport Walk of Fame.
- 2023 - Inaugural recipient of the University of Canberra’s Frank S. Pyke Alumni Award for sports studies graduates who have made a significant contribution to the advancement of Australia’s sports industry.
- 2025 - ACT Sport Hall of Fame Associate Member
- 2026 - ACT Senior Australian of the Year.
