= Kosciuszko, New South Wales =

Kosciuszko New South Wales
- Coordinates: 36°26′54″S 148°14′04″E
- Population: 0 (2016 census)
- Postcode(s): 2627
- LGA(s): Snowy Valleys Council
Suburbs around Kosciuszko:
Geehi	Geehi	Munyang
Murray Gorge	Kosciuszko	Thredbo
Murray Gorge	Pilot Wilderness	Jacobs River

Kosciuszko is a locality in Snowy Valleys Council, New South Wales, Australia. It was previously spelled as Kosciusko. In the 2016 census, Kosciuszko had no population.

== Heritage listings ==
Kosciuszko has a number of heritage-listed sites, including:

- Mount Kosciuszko to Eden: Bundian Way
