= Bimberi =

Bimberi is a locality in the Snowy Valleys Council area of New South Wales, Australia.
