= Sue Bulger =

Australian politician

Sue Bulger OAM
- Other names: Suzanne Bulger
- Employer: Tumut Council
- Known for: Indigenous Land Council and Mayor
- Board member of: Local Aboriginal Land Council

Suzanne Bulger or Sue Bulger OAM was the First Indigenous Mayor of Tumut. She was CEO of Brungle-Tumut Local Aboriginal Land Council, as well as Mayor of Tumut. She was awarded the Medal of the Order of Australia, in the King's Birthday honours in June 2024.

== Early life and career ==
Bulger is an elder of the Wiradjuri community, who was raised within the Brungle Mission. She was a long-standing member of the Local Aboriginal Land Council (LALC), holding a position with the LALC over a number of decades. She was a Councillor for Tumut Shire since 2000, and was then later elected to the position of Mayor. Tumut Shire Council later changed name to Snowy Valleys Council.

Bulger was a teacher, following in the footsteps of her father and her aunty. Bulger's has worked with the local community, particularly with First Nations members of the public.

Bulger has been an active member of the Tumut community, contributing to various school community as well as First Nations communities. She has worked at various schools including St Judes, in Canberra, St Brigid's in Tumut, St Patrick's in Gundagai, from 1981 to 1994, as well as other schools in regional NSW and ACT including Cootamundra, Boorowa, and Tumut.

Bulger has been on various committees, on first the Tumut Shire Council, and then the Snowy Valleys Council, including:

- the sports committee,
- Climate Change committee,
- Public Arts advisory committee and numerous others.

Bulger was also on the board change the Australian National anthem, to make the lyrics more inclusive to First Nations people.

"[The change last year] was a very small first step for us," she said. "[The new verses] would mean that we could truly celebrate our anthem because it would include us, the First Nations people, and the special places that are around Australia."

== Awards and recognition ==
- 2024 - Medal of the Order of Australia - King's Birthday honours.
- 2024 - Board Member, Recognition in Anthem Project
- 2016 - Mayor of Tumut.
