= Tumbarumba Shire =

Former local government area in New South Wales, Australia

- Local government area
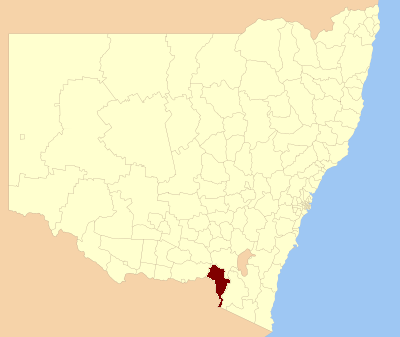
- Location in New South Wales
- Coordinates: 35°45′S 148°00′E
- Country: Australia
- State: New South Wales
- Region: Riverina
- Abolished: 12 May 2016
- Council seat: Tumbarumba

Government
  - Mayor: Ian Chaffey (Independent)
  - State electorate: Albury
  - Federal division: Division of Riverina

Area
  - Total: 4,393 km^{2} (1,696 sq mi)

Population
  - Total: 3,521 (2013 est)
  - Density: 0.80150/km^{2} (2.0759/sq mi)
- Website: Tumbarumba Shire
LGAs around Tumbarumba Shire
Wagga Wagga	Tumut	Cooma-Monaro
Greater Hume	Tumbarumba Shire	Snowy River
Towong (Vic)	Towong (Vic)	Snowy River

Tumbarumba Shire was a local government area in the eastern Riverina region, located in the foothills of the Snowy Mountains, on the upper reaches of the Murray River in New South Wales, Australia. It came into existence in 1906. Prior to this the area covered by the shire was unincorporated. It included the town of Tumbarumba and the small towns of Rosewood, Tooma, Khancoban and Jingellic.

A 2015 review of local government boundaries recommended that the Tumbarumba Shire merge with the Tumut Shire to form a new council. This recommendation was not supported by any of the preceding IPART and Tcorp assessments, which recommended a merger between Tumut and Gundagai shires instead. When the NSW Government released their proposal in December 2015, the Government's website stated that the proposal was 'broadly consistent with Tumut Council's stated preference'. Tumut Council submitted its preferences during a consultation period following the IPART's 'Fit for the Future' report, in October 2015 after it was found 'Not Fit'. Tumbarumba Shire Council did not elect any merger partners as part of this process, with the finding it was 'Fit' as a 'Rural Council'.

As a result, many residents of Tumbarumba Shire viewed Tumut Shire Council's choice to nominate a merger of the Gundagai, Tumbarumba, and Tumut shires as the catalyst behind the NSW Government proposal to merge the Tumbarumba Shire with Tumut Shire, (which was never one of Tumut Shire Council's stated preference). The resulting opposition by the residents of Tumbarumba Shire was almost unanimous, with a publicly convened 'Save Tumbarumba Shire' committee executing an active grass roots, public campaign.

The NSW Government proposal would see a combined Shire with an area of 8,960 square kilometres (3,460 sq mi) and support a population of approximately 14,953. On 12 May 2016, the NSW Government dissolved Tumbarumba Shire and along with Tumut Shire and merged the councils to form the Snowy Valleys Council.

The last mayor of Tumbarumba Shire was Ian Chaffey, an independent politician.

== Council ==
=== Current composition and election method ===
At the time of dissolution, Tumbarumba Shire Council was composed of eight councillors elected proportionally as a single ward. All councillors were elected for a fixed four-year term of office. The mayor was elected by the councillors at the first meeting of the council. The last election was held on 8 September 2012 and the makeup of the council was as follows:

Party	Councillors
Independents and Unaligned	8
Total	8

The final Council, elected in 2012, in order of election, was:

Councillor	Party	Notes
Julie Giddings	Unaligned	
Ian Chaffey	Independent	Mayor
Rodney Shaw	Unaligned	
Tony a'Beckett	Unaligned	
Alan Becke	Independent	
Brent Livermore	Independent	Deputy Mayor from Sept 2014
Sue Fletcher	Unaligned	
George Martin	Unaligned	
