= Wondalga =

- Town
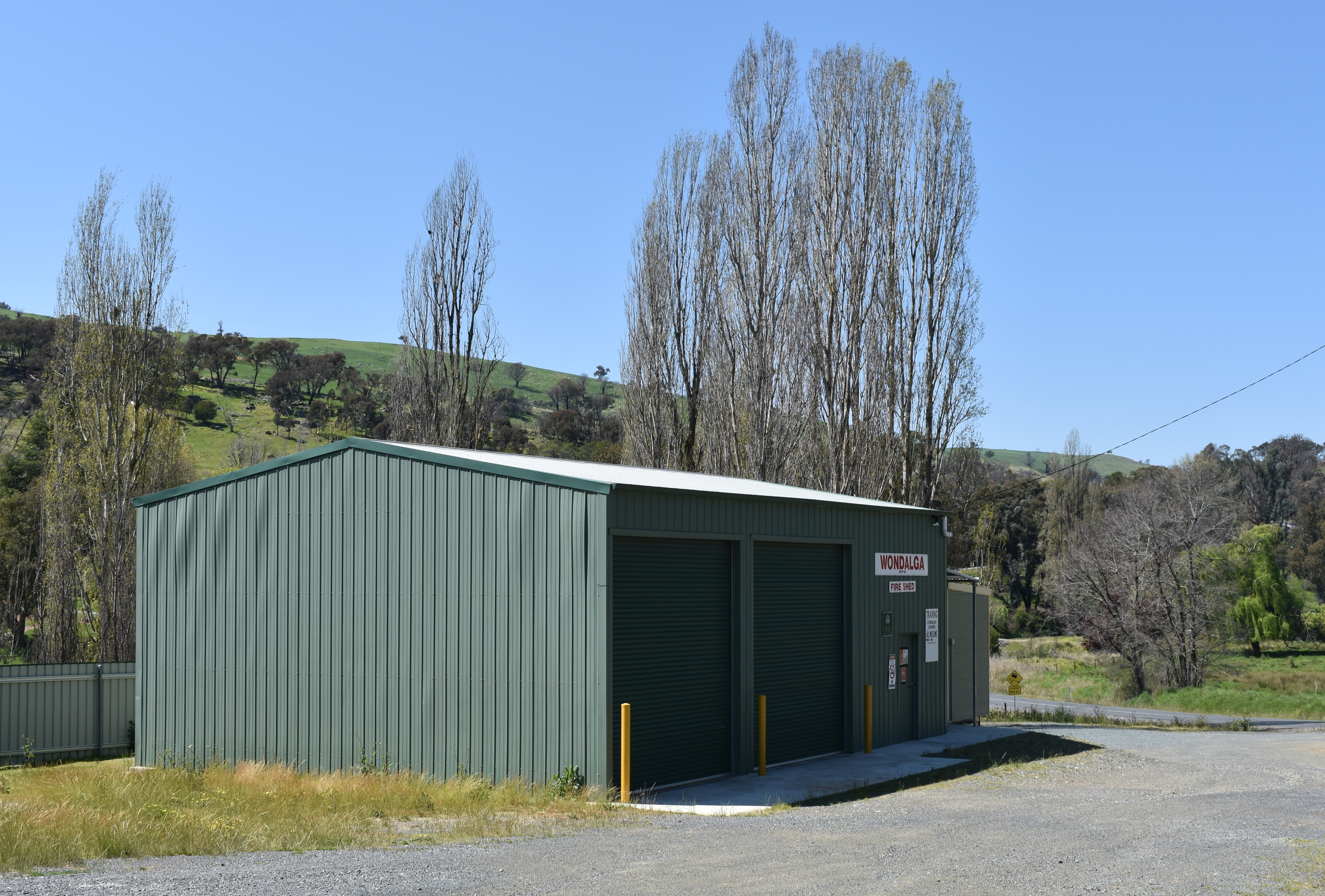
- Wondalga RFS shed, 2020

- Coordinates: 35°25′S 148°07′E
- Country: Australia
- State: New South Wales
- LGA: Snowy Valleys Council
- Location: 14 km (8.7 mi) from Batlow; 16 km (9.9 mi) from Adelong

Government
  - State electorate: Wagga Wagga
  - Federal division: Riverina
- Elevation: 361 m (1,184 ft)

Population
  - Total: 85 (2021 census)
- Postcode: 2729
- County: Wynyard

Wondalga is a rural community in the central east part of the Riverina and situated about 14 kilometres (8.7 mi) north of Batlow and 16 kilometres (9.9 mi) south of Adelong.

Middle Adelong Post Office opened on 1 August 1875, was renamed Wondalga in 1908 and closed in 1971.
