= Brungle =

- Town
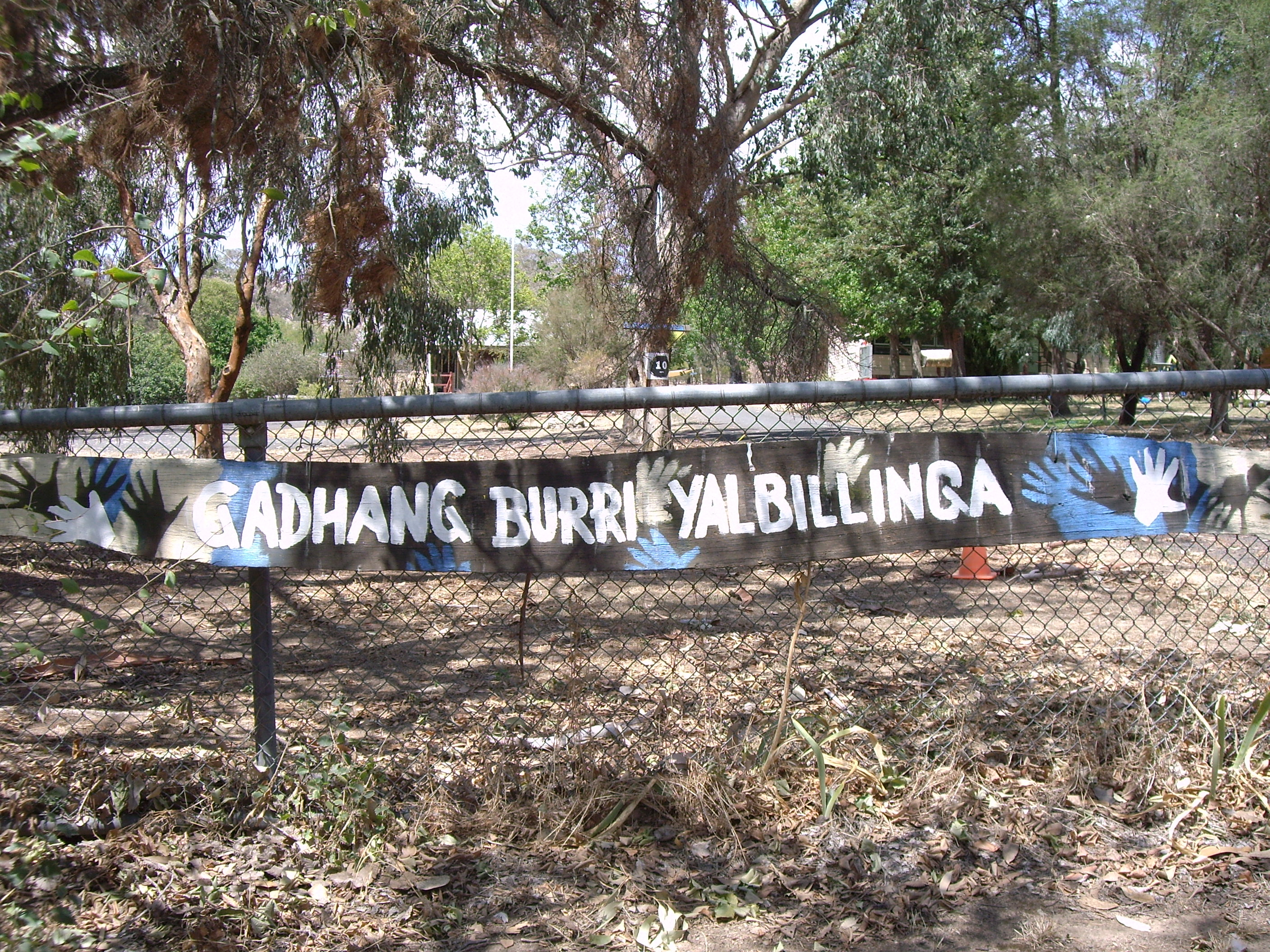
- Brungle Primary School — "Gadhang Burri Yalbillinga"

- Coordinates: 35°08′S 148°13′E
- Country: Australia
- State: New South Wales
- LGA: Snowy Valleys Council
- Location: 390 km (240 mi) from Sydney; 93 km (58 mi) from Wagga Wagga; 20 km (12 mi) from Tumut; 13 km (8.1 mi) from Gundagai

Government
  - State electorate: Wagga Wagga
  - Federal division: Riverina

Population
  - Total: 112 (2016 census)
- Postcode: 2722
- County: Buccleuch

Brungle is a village community in the central east part of the Riverina region, New South Wales, Australia. It is situated by road, about 16 kilometres (9.9 mi) south-east of Gundagai and 20 kilometres north-east of Tumut. It has a population of 112.

Brungle Post Office opened on 1 January 1868 and closed in 1975.

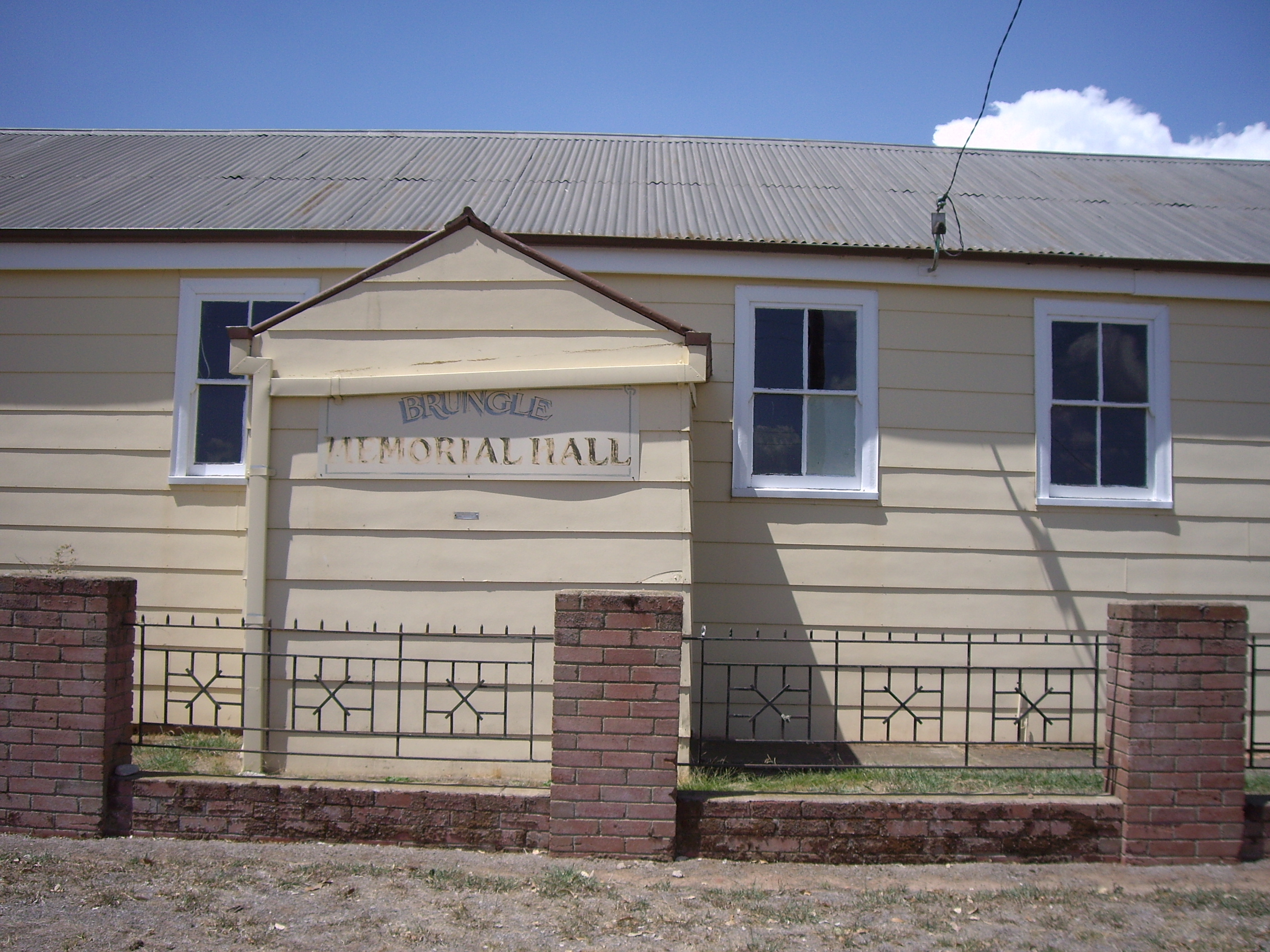
Brungle Memorial Hall

Brungle is home to a large community of Waradajhi people. The Brungle Public School is testament to this with its sign at the front of the school, written in the local Aboriginal language that states Gadhang Burri Yalbillinga which means Happy Children Learn. The school was established back in 1868 and has an enrolment of approximately 26 pupils in two classes of whom at any one time about 56% are Waradajhi.
