= Gocup =

- Town
- Coordinates: 35°13′17″S 148°11′4″E
- Country: Australia
- State: New South Wales
- LGA: Snowy Valleys Council
- Location: 9 km (5.6 mi) from Tumut; 26 km (16 mi) from Gundagai

Government
  - State electorate: Wagga Wagga
  - Federal division: Riverina
- Elevation: 308 m (1,010 ft)

Population
  - Total: 153 (2021 census)
- Postcode: 2720
- County: Wynyard

Gocup is a town community in the central east part of the Riverina and situated about 9 kilometres (5.6 mi) north of Tumut and 26 kilometres (16 mi) south of Gundagai on the Gundagai to Tumut Road.

Gocup Post Office opened on 21 October 1885 and closed in 1959.
