= Bundian Way =

Historic road in New South Wales, Australia

- Location within New South Wales Location within Australia
- 36°59′S 148°52′E
- Location: Mount Kosciuszko to Eden, New South Wales, Australia

New South Wales Heritage Register
- Official name: Bundian Way; Aboriginal track path
- Type: State heritage (landscape)
- Designated: 18 January 2013
- Reference no.: 1906
- Type: Other - Aboriginal
- Category: Aboriginal

The Bundian Way is a 265-kilometre (165 mi) travelling route, notable for its significance in facilitating cultural exchange, maritime trade, education, and exploration by Indigenous Australians. The heritage-listed route forms part of the modern-day Kosciuszko National Park, state forest, and local roads. It stretches from Mount Kosciuszko in the Snowy Mountains, through the Monaro region to Eden on the far South Coast of New South Wales. It was added to the New South Wales State Heritage Register on 18 January 2013, where it is also known as the Aboriginal track path.

== History ==
The Bundian Way is an ancient Aboriginal route that traversed the land between Targangal (Mount Kosciuszko) and the coast at Bilgalera (Twofold Bay, Eden). At the time of its heritage listing, the Bundian Way had been recently surveyed and researched by the Eden Aboriginal Land Council and John Blay who have identified the extent of the 265-kilometre (165 mi) route. Historical records such as original 19th century survey reports and journals make numerous references to the route between the high country and the sea. For example, the journals of Oswald Walters Brierly describe a journey he made from Twofold Bay in 1842 along a traditional route through the mountains under the guidance of an Aboriginal man, Budgibro. The journal includes notes and drawings of the journey and the route taken. A surveyor, Francis McCabe, made a survey of the route between the Monaro and Twofold Bay in 1945. The Chief Protector of Aborigines, George Augustus Robinson, recorded the story of Al.mil.gong who walked all the way from Omeo to present his new corroboree to his kin at Bilgalera on Twofold Bay on 14 August 1844. In January 1866 A. W. Howitt observed:

" . . . a very old mark made by the blacks who used this very track in going to Maneroo . . . A little beyond was a new mark - evidently Harry's (who had already taken there by Omeo Jack a year or so back) and we then found ourselves on the old black's trail..."

— A. W. Howitt

Historical records were then used to identify the correlating terrain and crosschecked by evidence such as accessibility, resources, scarred trees and other Aboriginal objects. Through the extremely rugged country the route followed the only passable way along ridgelines and through gaps. There are places on the route that are clearly ideal camping places and associated with these are food sources such as yams, water and substantial artefact deposits. When geologist, W. B. Clarke, travelled in the area in 1852 he recorded how Aboriginal people who lived nearby told of the Bundian Pass.

The Bundian Way is a pathway that connects the highest part of the continent with the eastern coast bringing together the people of the greater region, most notably for ceremonies associated with whaling in springtime at Twofold Bay and moth hunting in the high country during summer. Large gatherings of Aboriginal people occurred in the high country during the summer at the time when the bogong moths (Agrotis infusa) were in season. The gatherings were an essential part of Aboriginal cultural life and the moths ensured that there was sufficient food for the numbers gathered. There are numerous accounts of these gatherings amongst the papers of early 19th century settlers. Aboriginal people are recorded to have travelled to the areas where the moths were most prolific, usually in rock shelters. Bogong moths have a very high fat content and were sought after for nourishment. The records state that Aboriginal people would arrive lean and thin and leave well nourished by the oils and fats provided by the moths. In 1836 George Bennet described in detail the way the moths were cooked or smoked and stored for later use. Some of the cooked moths were pounded into dough and mixed with grain to make a type of cake. He described them as having a sweet nut-like taste. Bogong moths migrate each year as the weather warms in south east Australia: flying over spring to the high country of the Snowy Mountains in southern New South Wales and the Victorian Alps. People would travel from as far afield as the east coast to attend these gatherings which lasted over the summer months.

In the spring people would travel to the coast to attend the whale gatherings at Bilgalera (Fisheries Beach, Twofold Bay). In August 1844 G. A. Robinson recorded an event in his journal which described one of these gatherings. The account tells of a corroboree with whales harvested to feed the 60 or 70 people present about half of whom he describes as "Maneroo" who had walked from as far afield as places around Delegate and Cooma.

People walked the Bundian pathway not just to attend a corroboree or gathering to access a particular food supply but for practical, ceremonial and educational purposes: to maintain kinship ties, conduct business and trade, share knowledge and resources or make alliances and settle disputes. Aboriginal people were not nomadic for they were strongly connected to their own "country" to which they had obligations and cultural ties; rather they undertook seasonal journeys which were an important aspect of their cultural life.

When white settlers and explorers moved into the area they were shown the route by Aboriginal guides such as Budgibro and Omeo Jack; this assistance helped settlers to find places to bring their cattle and where to establish homesteads. Today part of the Bundian Way is still used as a travelling stock route.

There were numerous traditional pathways between the high country and the coast, however, the Bundian Way is one of the longest and best documented routes which still retains its historic setting. The landscape appearance of the setting is largely unchanged. The cultural knowledge associated with the Way has persisted into modern times and the Way continues to be highly significant to Aboriginal people in south east New South Wales and the Monaro.

=== Historic themes ===
There are historic themes which relate specifically to the different sections of the track; namely:

1. Targangal (Kosciuszko) to Moyangul (Pinch): High Country, Bogongs;
2. Moyangul (Pinch) to Merambego: Before and after the coming of the shepherds and cattlemen;
3. Merambego to Delegate: The changing land. Richness of the old Monaro;
4. Delegate to Bondi Springs (Mountaintop): Settlement and the coming of the settlers;
5. Bundian Pass to Towamba: The old Bundian Pass; stages of dispossession; shadows of the Imlays, Ben Boyd, Robinson, Brierly and Weatherhead;
6. Towamba to Bilgalera (Fisheries Beach): The old Bundian Pass; stages of dispossession; shadows of the Imlays, Ben Boyd, Robinson, Brierly and Weatherhead; and
7. Bilgalera (Fisheries Beach) to Eden and on to Monaroo-Bobberer-Gudu Culture Centre at Jigamy: Bilgalera and Kiah: land and sea country a long time occupied; first contacts.

The Bundian Way Management Committee of volunteers who spent over ten years organising for the recognition and use of the Bundian Way by residents and visitors, was recognised in 2013 with a NSW Heritage Volunteers Awards by Minister for Heritage, Robyn Parker MLA.

== Description ==
The Bundian Way is a shared history pathway between Targangal (Kosciuszko) and Bilgalera (Fisheries Beach) that connects the highest part of the Australian continent and the coast. On its way to the coast the Bundian Way crosses the Snowy River and passes through some of the wildest, most rugged and yet beautiful country in Australia. In many parts the influence of the old land management is still obvious in its Aboriginal landscapes. It is the first Aboriginal pathway to be listed on the NSW State Heritage Register.

The Bundian Way is a pathway traversing and connecting two landscapes: Targangal (Kosciuszko) and Bilgalera (Fisheries Beach) on Tullemullerer (Twofold Bay). The pathway was surveyed in 2010 using the location of Aboriginal objects, historical writings and maps, stories and oral history and surveyors scarred trees and journals to identify the route. The Bundian Way was identified by the survey team as the traditional Heritage Route. They also identified a slightly more accessible route which they have called the Touring Route which will be promoted as a walking trail. This listing refers to the Heritage Route which is 265 kilometres (165 mi) in length. The width of the curtilage of the route is 20 metres (66 ft) and generally follows fire trails, tracks and forestry roads. The route passes through state forest, national park, rural areas and coastal areas. About half of the route passes through proclaimed wilderness. A section follows Crown and Council owned roads through rural areas.

Sections of the way have survey scars dating from the time of first settlement. For example, Surveyor Thomas Scott Townsend was guided from Omeo in 1841 by two Aboriginal guides using part of the Bundian Way. The natural areas on the Bundian Way traverse a range of landscapes from the alpine high country, across its grassland edges and down through forested scarps to the coast. Across the Monaro the way is intersected by campsites at about every 12 kilometres (7.5 mi) located at a water source. These places are now used by travelling stockmen and are part of the Crown Land Travelling Stock Reserves (TSRs). Aboriginal objects have also been found at these locations and often food sources were associated with the place. For example, on the Monaro yam fields were identified, the yam being a traditional food source which would have been used by those travelling the Way.

Whilst the Bundian Way follows a single path that heads directly between the high country and Twofold Bay, the path is crossed by numerous north-south routes and there are paths off the Bundian Way that follow spurs to other places. The Bundian Way is part of the regional network of old pathways.

An extract from the survey report by John Blay and Eden Local Aboriginal Land Council provides a physical description of the seven stages of the Bundian Way Heritage Route:

Stage 1 – Targangal (Kosciuszko) to Moyangul (Pinch)

The route leads from the summit along the crest of the Great Divide to South Ramshead, down to Deadhorse Gap and generally then along the Cascade Trail past Cascade and Tin Mine huts. It deviates from this trail before Freebody's to follow the old route from Omeo followed by Surveyor Townsend in 1841/2, and then follows the track down the Nine Mile Pinch to Moyangul (Pinch River) near its junction with the Snowy. Artefacts were plentiful all along the trail. Large open sites were found at various places along the route, most notably above the Cascade Hut and the Tin Mine Hut, suggesting the settlers followed the Aboriginal people in where they chose to stopover and build.

Stage 2 – Moyangul (Pinch) to Merambego

The route follows the old trail beside the Snowy River to the Sandy Creek Trail crossing, then follows the trail to the crest of the ridge, where it follows an old track down to Sheepstation Creek. It proceeds beside the creek to the junction with Joe Davis Creek, thence proceeds to the top of the ridge that divides the creeks, continuing along the crest of the divide to the gap and up the ridge to the crest of the range at an elevation of 1092m overlooking Edbo Flat. Thence along the old cattlemen's trail past the Stockyard to Byadbo Gap, following the Merambego track past the old homestead site to the Darrewarra campsite. It appears one of Townsend's trees marked in 1841 still stands at the point where he crossed the river, near the Sandy Creek crossing. Subject to verification, and finding more trees (marked at intervals of one mile), this is a very significant place.

Stage 3 – Merambego to Delegate

The route follows the main track and road through Wallendibby and Corrowong to Delegate. There are extraordinary views back along the route from McGuigans Gap, the southernmost reach of the Treeless Plains at Corrowong, and various Aboriginal landscapes.

Stage 4 – Delegate to Bondi Springs (Mountaintop)

The route follows the Craigie and Mila roads, then the Mila Shortcut Road to the Monaro Highway, thence about 1.5 km beside the highway to the old Bondi Springs (Mountaintop TSR) across road from Southern Access Rd. Mountaintop (Bondi Springs) has special values as Aboriginal landscape and educational values as a family and women's place.

Stage 5 – Bundian Pass to Towamba

The route follows Southern Access Rd eastwards, then Pines Rd to near the Nalbaugh Falls picnic area, thence down to the White Rock River and along the old road reserve until entering SE Forests NP, thence through bush across the White Rock River, across the gap in the range and across Sheepstation Creek, thence up the hill beside Surveyors Gully and across Imlay Road, thence following the old route of the old Rockton Road, which joins Laings Road, Nungatta Road, Poole Road to beside Imlay Road for a km, and then along the old Pericoe Road to Towamba Hall. There are major campsites along White Rock, Sheepstation and Nungatta streams. Scar trees are a significant feature.

Stage 6 – Towamba to Bilgalera (Fisheries Beach)

The heritage route crosses the Towamba River and generally follows the Towamba Road to Mitchells Creek, where it goes directly over the crest of the hills and along the ridgetops. No side-cuts were part of the earliest alignment. Rather than go down to Yuglama, it follows the short-cut Rd to Nullica flats and to Beermuna (Boydtown). Significant features include forests, Mount Imlay, and Imlay Creek campsite.

Stage 7 – Bilgalera (Fisheries Beach) to Eden and on to Monaroo-Bobberer-Gudu Culture Centre at Jigamy

The walking route follows an old track to Davidson Whaling Station, then follows the shoreline around the inlet passing massive middens of the old Kiah (East Boyd). It snakes round above mangroves and the sand flats westwards to the old crossing of the Towamba River. Across the river it rejoins the old public access road reserve across the ridge to Beermuna (Boydtown), where just before the lagoon it follows a track to the beach. Thence it proceeds round the beach of Nullica Bay to the inlet, which might be waded but the bridge is easier. The way around Mungora (Northcote Point) might only be accessible at low tide and therefore following the ridge above the rocks and Currawalla Beach is easiest. From the north eastern corner of Bungo Beach a delightful track leads to Cocora Beach, after which it follows a route through Eden and along Aslings Beach to Beowa National Park and through State Forest to Jigamy. A loop route from Jigamy passes through Beowa National Park to Quondolo Beach and Pinnacles Beach and National Park tracks back to Aslings Beach and Eden. This stage is where there are frequent and very large middens and artefact scatters. While these are valuable reminders of the area's Aboriginal past, visitors should be asked not to walk on middens and to leave artefacts where they lie. Fencing is not required.

=== Condition ===
As at 14 June 2012, the Bundian Way traversed wilderness areas, national parks, rural lands, state forest and coastal areas.

The cultural landscape setting of the Bundian Way is highly intact.

=== Further information ===
The Bundian Way is a shared history pathway between Targangal (Kosciuszko) and Bilgalera (Fisheries Beach) that connects the highest part of the Australian continent and the coast. On its way to the coast the Bundian Way crosses the Snowy River and passes through some of the wildest, most rugged and yet beautiful country in Australia. In many parts the influence of the old land management is still obvious in its Aboriginal landscapes. It is the first Aboriginal pathway to be listed on the NSW State Heritage Register.

== Heritage listing ==
As at 25 January 2013, the Bundian Way is of State significance as a rare surviving ancient pathway used by Aboriginal people over thousands of years linking the high country at Kosciuszko and the coast at Eden. The Bundian Way is associated with seasonal gatherings of Aboriginal tribes on the Snowy River for bogong moth collection and on the Eden Coast during whale migration. It is historically significant for its role in early colonisation whereby white settlers were aided by Aboriginal guides in exploration and the search for pastures.

Historical documentation and archaeology found on the route reinforces traditional knowledge held by contemporary Aboriginal society and provides a strong validation of the social significance of this pathway today. The Way continues to be an important place of education and cultural activity in the Aboriginal community.

The Bundian Way passes through wilderness areas with views over the coastal plain, which contribute to the route's aesthetic significance.

The Bundian Way was listed on the New South Wales State Heritage Register on 18 January 2013 having satisfied the following criteria.

The place is important in demonstrating the course, or pattern, of cultural or natural history in New South Wales.

The Bundian Way is an ancient pathway which demonstrates the historical movement of Aboriginal people over thousands of years between the high country and the coast. The Bundian Way provides historical evidence of the cultural life of Aboriginal people of the Monaro and of the South Coast and their inter-relationships with each other. The Bundian Way provides direct evidence of the crucial role Aboriginal people played in early exploration and settlement by white colonists. Aboriginal people provided knowledge of the routes, the places where resources such as food and water could be found and also the best places for grazing and settling.

The place has a strong or special association with a person, or group of persons, of importance of cultural or natural history of New South Wales's history.

The Bundian Way is associated with seasonal gatherings of Aboriginal tribes in Eden (Bilgalera) and in the Snowy Mountains (Targangal). Tribes came together in the springtime at Twofold Bay (Tullemullerer) for a gathering associated with the migration pattern of whales. They also came together in the summer in the high country via the Snowy River (Nurudj Dujurung) to gather bogong moths.

The place is important in demonstrating aesthetic characteristics and/or a high degree of creative or technical achievement in New South Wales.

The high country end of the Bundian Way travels through wilderness with extremes in heights with extraordinary views. Many points along the way afford spectacular outlook over the coastal plain. The land is valued for its remoteness and natural beauty. The aesthetic significance of the Way contributes to its value as the tourist route which is currently in conceptual development.

The place has strong or special association with a particular community or cultural group in New South Wales for social, cultural or spiritual reasons.

Historical documentation and archaeology found on the route reinforce the traditional knowledge about the Bundian Way held in contemporary Aboriginal society and demonstrated through oral history. This provides a strong validation of the social significance of this pathway today. The Bundian Way demonstrates the connection with "Country" of Aboriginal people of the south coast of NSW and the Monaro. This cultural connection survives and continues in the people of these areas today. The work of the Eden Local Aboriginal Land Council and other members of the Aboriginal community to survey, research and protect the way as a place of education and ongoing cultural activity demonstrates a strong community sense of connection to the Bundian Way.

The place has potential to yield information that will contribute to an understanding of the cultural or natural history of New South Wales.

The Bundian Way and the associated cultural information has the potential to reveal information about the way in which the landscape was managed and traversed prior to its settlement in 1820. It also presents an opportunity to acquire more accurate information about the interaction between the colonists and local Aboriginal people and how these interactions influenced settlement patterns.

The place possesses uncommon, rare or endangered aspects of the cultural or natural history of New South Wales.

The Bundian Way is rare as it has the best preserved cultural landscape setting of the ancient east west routes of south eastern Australia. The ancient route traverses lands that have changed comparatively little since the early 19th century: many other routes have since become highways or pass through areas which have been subject to substantial change. The Way is unusual in that it has been surveyed along its full length and verified by physical evidence in the form of archaeology, food resources and markings on trees; further verification has been undertaken by cross-referencing with diaries and journals of early white settlers and explorers.

The place is important in demonstrating the principal characteristics of a class of cultural or natural places/environments in New South Wales.

The Bundian Way is an excellent example of the influence that Aboriginal knowledge of "Country" had upon the expansion of settlement in the colony. It is a fine example of one of the routes and pathways that were utilised throughout New South Wales and Australia by Aboriginal people over thousands of years.

== See also ==
- Aboriginal sites of New South Wales
