= Snowy Valleys Council =

Local government area in Australia

- Local government area
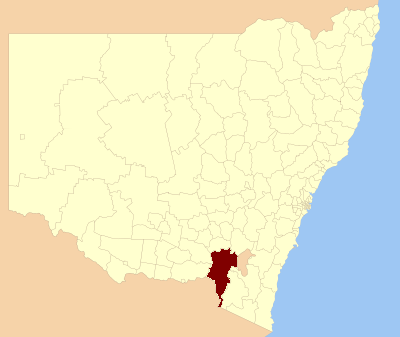
- Location in New South Wales

- Interactive map of Snowy Valleys Council
- Coordinates: 35°37′S 148°5′E
- Country: Australia
- State: New South Wales
- Region: South West Slopes
- Established: 12 May 2016

Government
  - Mayor: Julia Ham
  - State electorates: Albury; Wagga Wagga
  - Federal divisions: Farrer; Riverina

Area
  - Total: 8,960 km^{2} (3,460 sq mi)
- Website: Snowy Valleys Council
LGAs around Snowy Valleys Council
Wagga Wagga	Cootamundra-Gundagai	Yass Valley
Greater Hume	Snowy Valleys Council	Snowy Monaro, ACT
Towong (VIC)	Towong (VIC)	Snowy Monaro

The Snowy Valleys Council is a local government area located in the South West Slopes region of New South Wales, Australia. This area was formed on 12 May 2016 from the merger of the Tumut Shire and Tumbarumba Shire councils. However, following a massively successful referendum in 2025, the council will be deamalgamated back to the two shires by 2027.

The council area comprises 8,960 square kilometres (3,460 sq mi) and covers the western side of the southernmost parts of the Great Dividing Range and foothills in New South Wales. Large sections of the local government area are contained in national parks. At the time of its establishment, the population of the council area was estimated to be 14,953.

The Mayor of Snowy Valleys Council is Councillor Julia Ham, who won the most recent election in 2024.

In November 2025, the Snowy Valleys Council held a referendum to de-amalgamate into the former Tumbarumba Shire and Tumut Shire local government areas with 87.28% support and 12.72% against.

== Main towns and villages ==
In addition to the towns of Adelong, Batlow, Tumbarumba and Tumut, localities in the area include Brindabella, Brungle, Cabramurra, Gilmore, Grahamstown, Greg Greg, Gocup, Jingellic, Khancoban, Killimicat, Little River, Maragle, Rosewood, Talbingo, Tooma, Wondalga and Yarrangobilly.

== Heritage listings ==
The Snowy Valleys Council has a number of heritage-listed sites, including:

- Mount Kosciuszko to Eden: Bundian Way
- Tumut, Adelong Falls Gold Workings
- Tumut, Cootamundra-Tumut railway: Tumut railway station
- Tumut, 46 Russell Street: Montreal Community Theatre
- Tumut, Tumut Plains Road: Junction Bridge, Tumut
- Rosewood, 1730 Tumbarumba Rd - Elm Cottage established c 1885.

== Demographics ==
At the 2021 census, there were 14,891 people in the Snowy Valleys local government area; of these 50.4% were male and 49.6% were female. The median age of people in Snowy Valleys Council was 45 years; the national median is 38 years.

At the 2021 census, 42.0% of residents stated their ancestry as Australian. 65% (Note: Excludes not stated responses.) nominated a religious affiliation with Christianity, which was significantly higher than the national average of 47.1%. 87.2% of households only speak English at home, higher than the national average of 72%.

Selected historical census data for Snowy Valleys local government area
Census year		2016	2021
Population	Estimated residents on census night	14,395	▲14,891
Population	LGA rank in terms of population size within New South Wales	77th	76th
Population	% of New South Wales population	0.19%	▼0.18%
Population	% of Australian population	0.06%	0.06%
Cultural and language diversity			
Ancestry, top responses	Australian (Note: The Australian Bureau of Statistics has stated that most who nominate "Australian" as their ancestry are part of the Anglo-Celtic group.)	45.5%	▼42.0%
Ancestry, top responses	English	38.9%	▲40.0%
Ancestry, top responses	Irish	11.7%	▼11.6%
Ancestry, top responses	Scottish	9.4%	▲9.7%
Ancestry, top responses	German	4.6%	n/c
Ancestry, top responses	Australian Aboriginal	0.7%	▲6.1%
Language, used at home (other than English)	Afrikaans	0.4%	▲0.6%
Language, used at home (other than English)	Mandarin	0.4%	▼0.3%
Language, used at home (other than English)	Filipino	0.2%	0.2%
Language, used at home (other than English)	German	0.2%	n/c
Language, used at home (other than English)	Thai	n/c	▲0.3%
Language, used at home (other than English)	Wiradjuri	n/c	▲0.2%
Religious affiliation			
Religious affiliation, top responses	Anglican	29.3%	▼23.8%
Religious affiliation, top responses	Catholic	26.2%	▼23.5%
Religious affiliation, top responses	No religion, so described (Note: In accordance with the Australian Bureau of Statistics source, 'No Religion, so described' does not include those who reported Secular and Other Spiritual Beliefs such as Atheism, Agnosticism and Own Spiritual Beliefs.)	18.8%	▲29.3%
Religious affiliation, top responses	Not stated	12.1%	▼9.9%
Religious affiliation, top responses	Presbyterian and Reformed	3.5%	▼2.8%
Median weekly incomes			
Personal income	Median weekly personal income	A$	A$
Personal income	% of Australian median income	%	%
Family income	Median weekly family income	A$	A$
Family income	% of Australian median income	%	%
Household income	Median weekly household income	A$	A$
Household income	% of Australian median income	%	%

== Council ==
Snowy Valleys Council consists of nine councillors elected proportionally as a single ward.

=== Current composition ===
Party	Councillors
Independents	8
Independent Labor	
Independent Liberal	
Libertarian	1
Total	9

The current Council, elected in 2024, is:

Councillor	Party	Notes
James Hayes	Independent	
Trina Thomson	Independent	
Grant Hardwick	Independent	
Julia Ham	Independent	Mayor
John Larter	Libertarian	
Andrew Wortes	Independent	
David Sheldon	Independent	
Michael Inglis	Independent	
Hugh Packard	Independent	Deputy Mayor

== Election results ==
=== 2024 ===
2024 New South Wales local elections: Snowy Valleys
Party	Candidate	Votes	%	±%
Independent	1. Michael Inglis; 2. Barney Hyams (Ind. Nat); 3. Max Gordon-Hall			
Independent	Hugh Packard			
Independent	Andrew Wortes			
Independent Labor	Michael Ivill			
Libertarian	John Larter			
Independent Liberal	Julia Ham			
Independent	David Sheldon			
Independent	James Hayes			
Independent	Sam Hughes			
Independent	Grant Hardwick			
Independent	Trina Thomson			
Independent	Johanna Armour			
Total formal votes				
Informal votes				
Turnout				

== See also ==
- Local government areas of New South Wales
