= Tumut High School =

Location
- Tumut, Riverina, New South Wales; Australia
- Coordinates: 35°18′S 148°13′E

Information
- Type: Government-funded co-educational comprehensive secondary day school
- Established: 1913; 113 years ago
- School district: Gundagai; Rural South and West
- Educational authority: NSW Department of Education
- Principal: Donald Dixon
- Teaching staff: 48.4 FTE (2018)
- Years: 7–12
- Enrolment: 538 (2018)
- Campus type: Regional
- Website: tumut-h.schools.nsw.gov.au

Tumut High School is a government-funded co-educational comprehensive secondary day school, located in Tumut, in the Riverina region of New South Wales, Australia.

Established in 1913 the school enrolled approximately 540 students in 2018, from Year 7 to Year 12, of whom ten percent identified as Indigenous Australians and four percent were from a language background other than English. The school is operated by the NSW Department of Education; the principal is Donald Dixon.

== See also ==
- List of government schools in New South Wales: Q–Z
- List of schools in the Riverina
- Education in Australia
