= Batlow, New South Wales =

Batlow
- Town
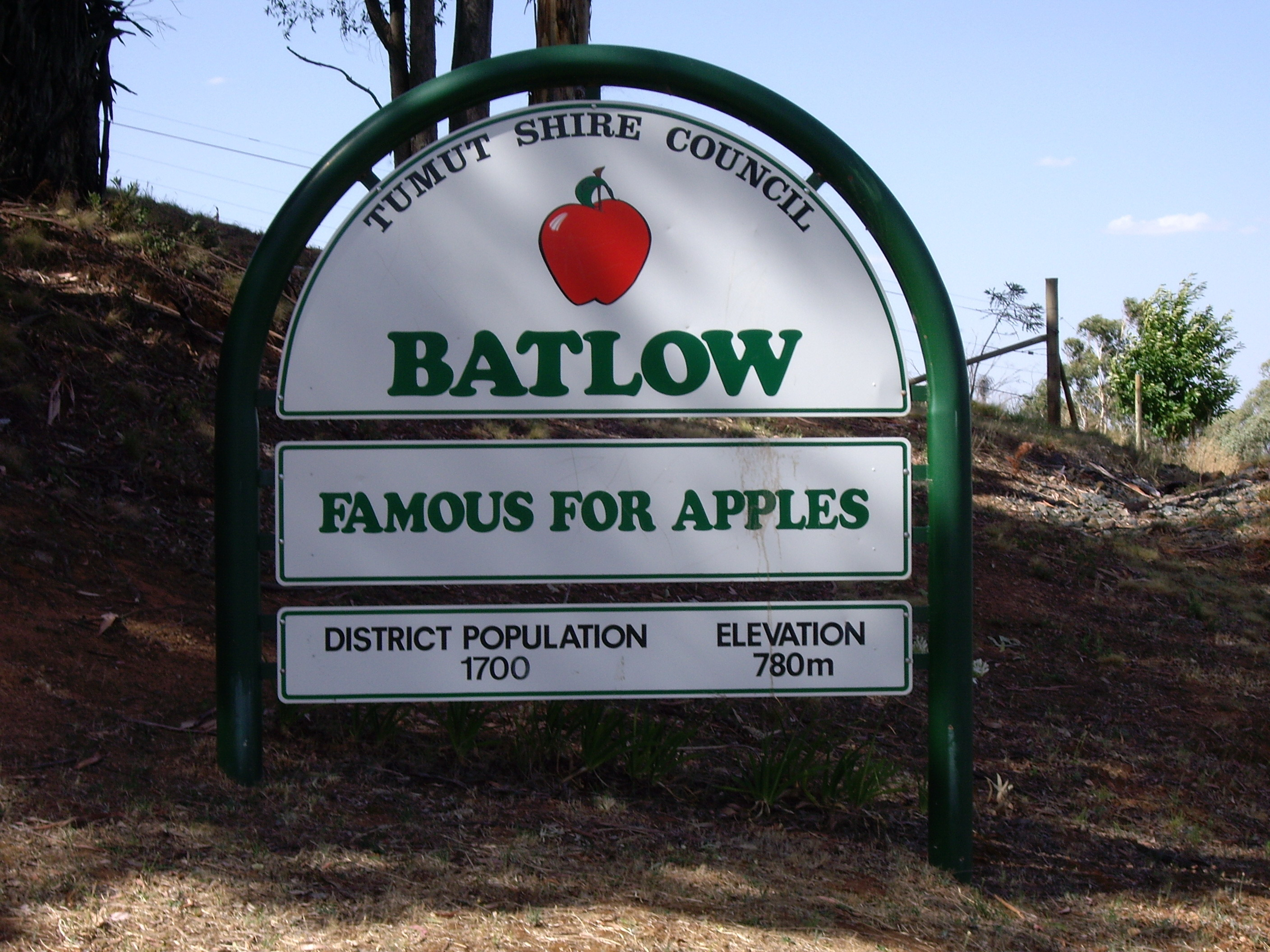
- Entering Batlow

- Coordinates: 35°31′0″S 148°09′0″E
- Country: Australia
- State: New South Wales
- LGA: Snowy Valleys Council
- Location: 438 km (272 mi) SW of Sydney; 94 km (58 mi) WSW of Canberra; 112 km (70 mi) ESE of Wagga Wagga; 33 km (21 mi) SSW of Tumut
- Established: 1850s

Government
  - State electorate: Wagga Wagga
  - Federal division: Riverina
- Elevation: 775 m (2,543 ft)

Population
  - Total: 1,270 (2021 census)
- Postcode: 2730
- County: Wynyard
- Mean max temp: 17.0 °C (62.6 °F)
- Mean min temp: 6.0 °C (42.8 °F)
- Annual rainfall: 1,222.3 mm (48.12 in)

Batlow is a town in the South West Slopes region of New South Wales, Australia, on the edge of the Great Dividing Range, 775 m above sea level.

Batlow is well known for its apples. About 50 growers in the district supply 1.6 million cases of apples, or 10% of the Australian apple crop, to the Australian market. The district also produces cherries and stone fruit. The town's main landmark, the "Big Apple", which stands on private land 5 km north of the town, stands testament to the orchards which have been vital to the town's economy for over 120 years.

== History ==
Before European settlement the Wiradjuri people lived in the Batlow area. Hamilton Hume and William Hovell were the first Europeans to explore the area in 1824, en route to Port Phillip.

When gold was discovered in the area in 1854, a small settlement called Reedy Creek was established as a supply point and service centre for the mining area, and a Mr Batlow surveyed a townsite nearby. The gold deposits were quickly exhausted, but farmers found the area better suited to a variety of crops, so the mining supply point was moved and the current township established around 1855. Reedy Flat Post Office opened on 1 August 1873 and was renamed Batlow in 1889. Fruit trees and timber quickly became the main sources of income for the town, and in 1910 the townsite was gazetted.

In 1922, the first cool stores in New South Wales were constructed in the town. At the same time a railway was built from nearby Tumut. These developments facilitated the town's trade with Sydney and beyond. The district supplied troops with dehydrated fruit and vegetables during World War II. Many Land Army Girls were stationed in and around Batlow during the Second World War and a sizeable collection of memorabilia is held at the Historical Society Museum. There are two Soldier Settlements close to Batlow, Willigobung and Kunama.

On 4 January 2020 the town was damaged by fire during the 2019–20 Australian bushfire season. In the town itself at least 17 homes were destroyed, as well as the old hospital and service station. Outlying properties were also affected with hundreds of apple trees "scorched".

== Population ==
In the 2016 Census, there were 1,313 people in Batlow. 76.3% of people were born in Australia and 81.5% of people spoke only English at home. The most common responses for religion were No Religion 27.0%, Anglican 24.5% and Catholic 20.4%.

== Climate and Geography ==
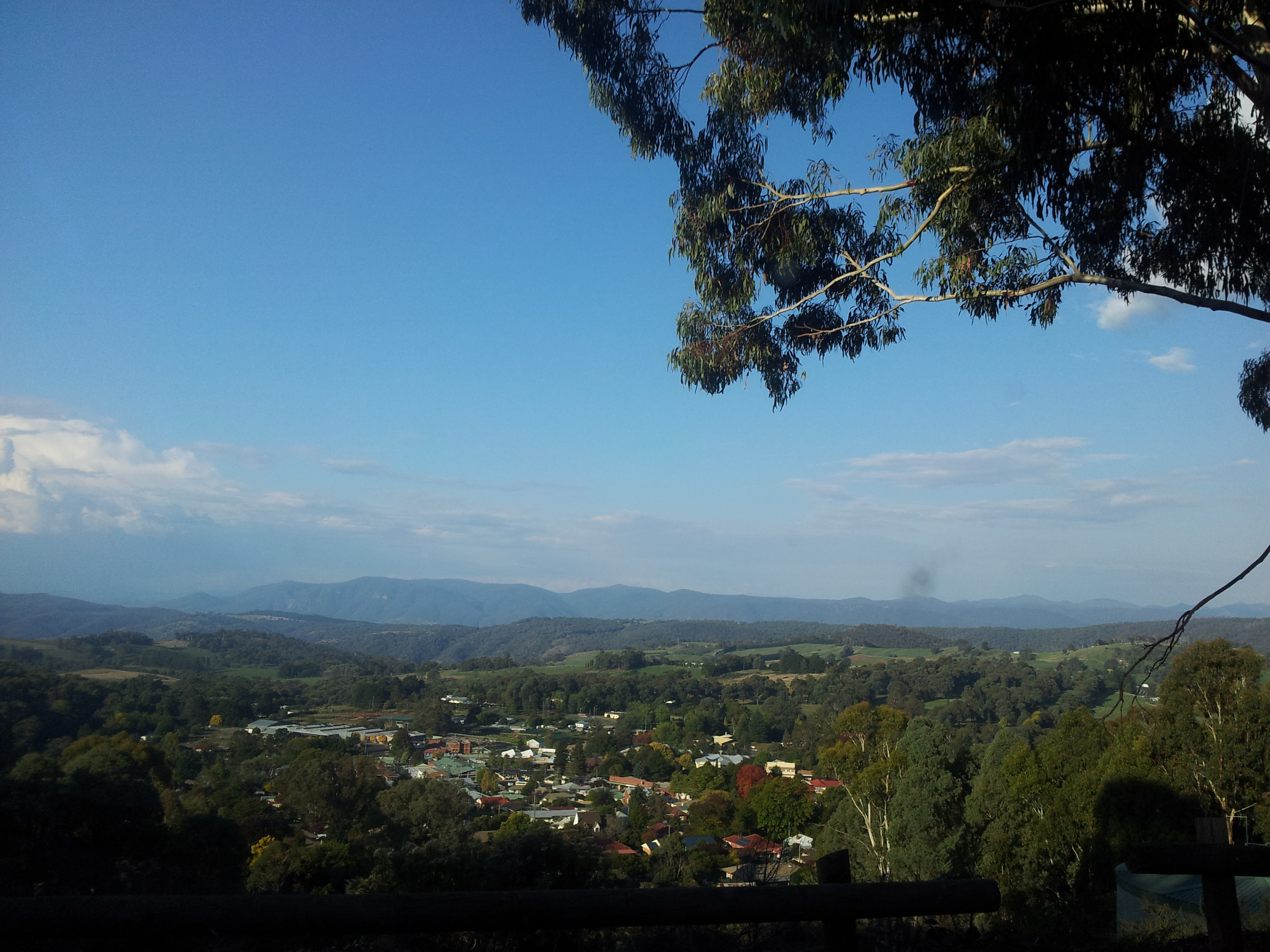

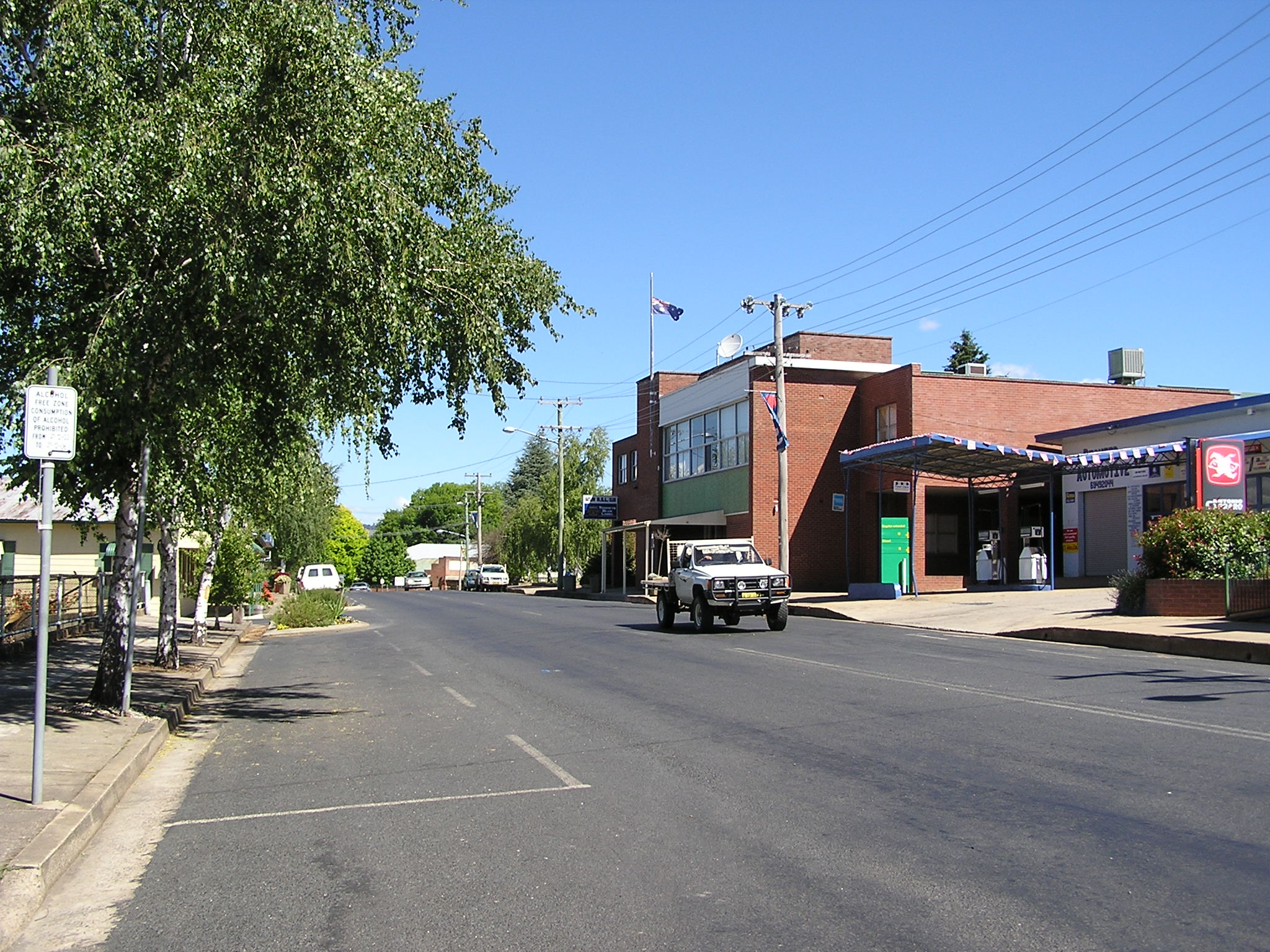

Batlow is located 94 kilometres (58 mi) west of Canberra, though, by highway is approximately 225 kilometres (140 mi) due to the Great Dividing Range between them. The nearest city is Wagga, whilst three towns: Tumut in the northeast; Adelong in the northwest; and Tumbarumba in the southwest, are within 40 kilometres (25 mi).

The countryside around Batlow is a plateau of rolling hills, straddling 1,000 metres (3,300 ft) in altitude. Being on the western edge of the Great Dividing Range, Batlow receives much of the precipitation that has not fallen farther west, an average of 1,222.3 millimetres (48.12 in) per year; chiefly in winter, with August at 147.7 millimetres (5.81 in). Little or no precipitation is received from the Tasman Sea to the east, due to the large distances and the Great Dividing Range; instead, precipitation is mainly sourced from Northwest cloudbands and cold fronts originating in the west/southwest. The cold, often snowy winters, combined with the higher rainfall and good soils, make an excellent apple-growing climate. However, in 2006, Batlow experienced the most severe downturn in rainfall in New South Wales, receiving only 392 millimetres (15.4 in) of rain that year.

Climate data for Green Hills State Forest (1938–1956, rainfall 1924–1972); 785 m AMSL; 35.52° S, 148.05° E
Month	Jan	Feb	Mar	Apr	May	Jun	Jul	Aug	Sep	Oct	Nov	Dec	Year
Mean daily maximum °C (°F)	26.3 (79.3)	25.2 (77.4)	22.7 (72.9)	17.3 (63.1)	12.7 (54.9)	9.2 (48.6)	8.2 (46.8)	9.5 (49.1)	13.3 (55.9)	16.2 (61.2)	19.4 (66.9)	23.9 (75.0)	17.0 (62.6)
Mean daily minimum °C (°F)	12.1 (53.8)	12.2 (54.0)	10.1 (50.2)	6.0 (42.8)	3.4 (38.1)	1.5 (34.7)	0.2 (32.4)	0.7 (33.3)	2.4 (36.3)	4.9 (40.8)	7.5 (45.5)	10.6 (51.1)	6.0 (42.8)
Average precipitation mm (inches)	73.1 (2.88)	66.9 (2.63)	74.2 (2.92)	93.0 (3.66)	120.3 (4.74)	119.4 (4.70)	138.9 (5.47)	147.7 (5.81)	103.8 (4.09)	119.3 (4.70)	92.2 (3.63)	71.6 (2.82)	1,222.3 (48.12)
Average precipitation days (≥ 0.2 mm)	6.7	6.6	6.7	8.6	10.3	11.9	14.6	15.2	11.5	12.0	8.5	8.0	120.6
Source: Australian Bureau of Meteorology; Green Hills State Forest

The Bago Plateau, to the south of Batlow, has a considerably cooler and wetter climate owing to its great elevation and exposure. Snow is frequent from June to September, with heavy falls that can last for more than a week at a time in shaded areas, and can even occur in the late spring to early summer period on rare occasions. The region is subject to heavy cloud cover in the winter months.

Climate data are sourced from Pilot Hill, at an altitude of 1,128 metres (3,701 ft).

Climate data for Bago (Pilot Hill, 1921–1951, rainfall 1910–1951); 1,128 m AMSL; 35.62° S, 148.15° E
Month	Jan	Feb	Mar	Apr	May	Jun	Jul	Aug	Sep	Oct	Nov	Dec	Year
Mean daily maximum °C (°F)	23.5 (74.3)	23.3 (73.9)	20.7 (69.3)	15.3 (59.5)	11.1 (52.0)	7.8 (46.0)	6.6 (43.9)	7.9 (46.2)	11.5 (52.7)	14.8 (58.6)	18.4 (65.1)	22.0 (71.6)	15.2 (59.4)
Mean daily minimum °C (°F)	9.7 (49.5)	10.3 (50.5)	8.3 (46.9)	4.5 (40.1)	1.5 (34.7)	−0.4 (31.3)	−1.4 (29.5)	−0.7 (30.7)	1.3 (34.3)	3.3 (37.9)	6.1 (43.0)	8.3 (46.9)	4.2 (39.6)
Average precipitation mm (inches)	74.1 (2.92)	75.5 (2.97)	100.8 (3.97)	102.0 (4.02)	124.1 (4.89)	166.7 (6.56)	171.3 (6.74)	158.1 (6.22)	131.0 (5.16)	132.5 (5.22)	97.4 (3.83)	80.0 (3.15)	1,413.5 (55.65)
Average precipitation days (≥ 0.2 mm)	6.1	5.7	6.7	6.6	8.0	12.4	11.7	13.9	11.9	10.5	7.7	7.3	108.5
Source: Australian Bureau of Meteorology; Bago (Pilot Hill)

== Present day ==
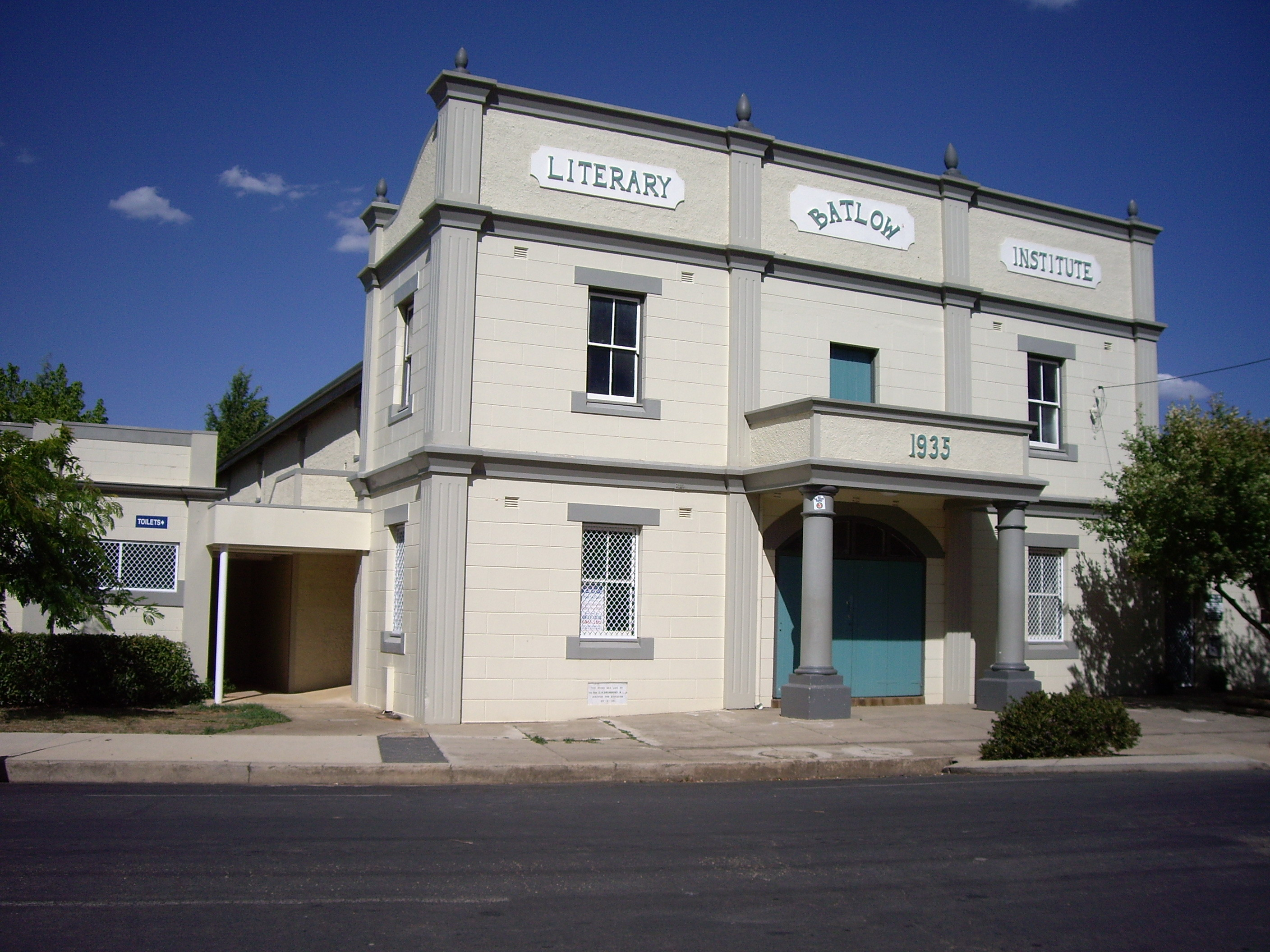
Batlow Literary Institute

Batlow is an agricultural town offering services and facilities to the surrounding area, including two primary schools and a high school, a library (with telecentre), a hall and several stores and small businesses. The Batlow Fruit Co-operative, trading since 1922, (now the Batlow Fruit Co.) is based in the town.

Batlow was the home of the 'Mountain Maid' cannery until its closure in the early 2000s. The steel frame of the WWII Lend Lease–constructed building used in the production of food for the allied troops was a landmark for many years until it was largely destroyed in the January 2020 bushfire.

Batlow's economy turns around the production of apples for the fresh food market. Some revenue is also obtained from other agricultural exploitations and timber from the large soft and hardwood plantations. There is a strong influx of seasonal labour for the harvesting of fruit from March to April. A smaller influx occurs at thinning time in December. There are a number of producers of cherries, nuts, honey and eucalyptus oil products.

The 43,000-hectare (110,000-acre) Bago State Forest between Batlow and Tumbarumba contains stands of alpine ash and radiata pine. Attractions include Pilot Hill Arboretum (est. 1920s) and the Sugar Pine Walk — a beautiful avenue of sugar pine resembling a cathedral.

On the third Saturday of May each year the Batlow Ciderfest is held in the main street, showcasing locally and regionally produced cider and regional food. Many interesting stalls also attend the family friendly Ciderfest event. The Ciderfest came second in the NSW Event awards only three years after its inauguration. On the Friday preceding a Cider Industry Conference is held. A 'Living Food conference' was later added to the CiderFest weekend.

On the third Saturday of October the Apple Blossom Festival is held. This re-invigorated festival began in 1942 and the First Apple Blossom Queen was a Land Army girl.

== Politics ==
Batlow is in the Snowy Valleys Council. Batlow was moved to the bellwether federal Division of Eden-Monaro for the 2007 federal election. Snowy Valleys residents, including those in Batlow, voted by 86% in November 2025 to reverse the 2016 forced merger of the Tumbarumba and Tumut councils, reflecting deep and persistent rural opposition to state‑imposed amalgamations. The de‑amalgamation process—costed at $4.8 million and expected to take at least two years was widely welcomed by local politicians and community groups as a strong assertion of rural political agency.

== See also ==
- Australia's Big Things
- Batlow railway line

== Fruit bowl sculpture ==
Carved by Fred Alwahan from the trunk of a red oak on Mayday Road, Batlow, NSW in 1994, it stands over two metres tall. The plaque (inset) informs that Alwahan donated the work as a tribute to the town's pioneers.

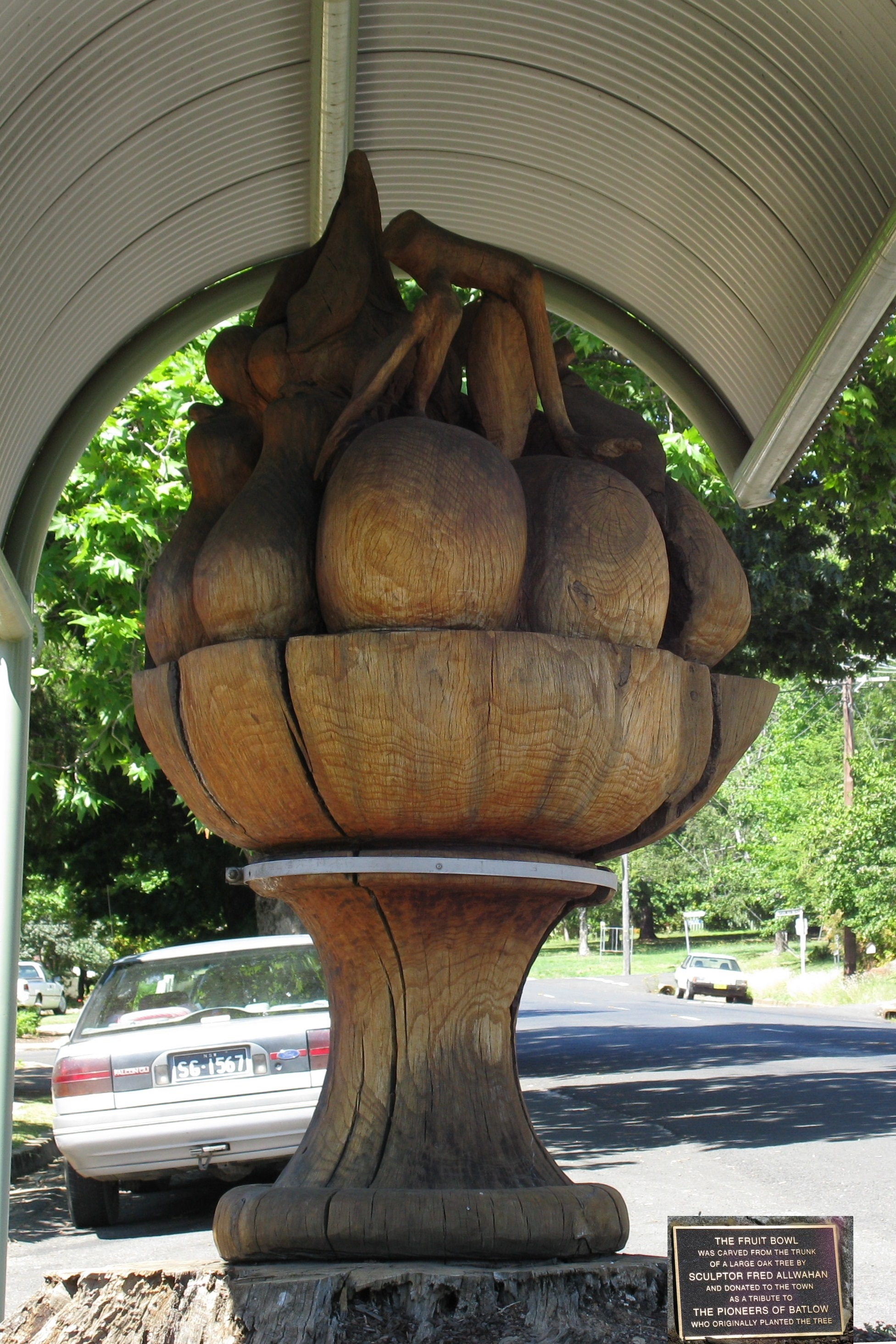

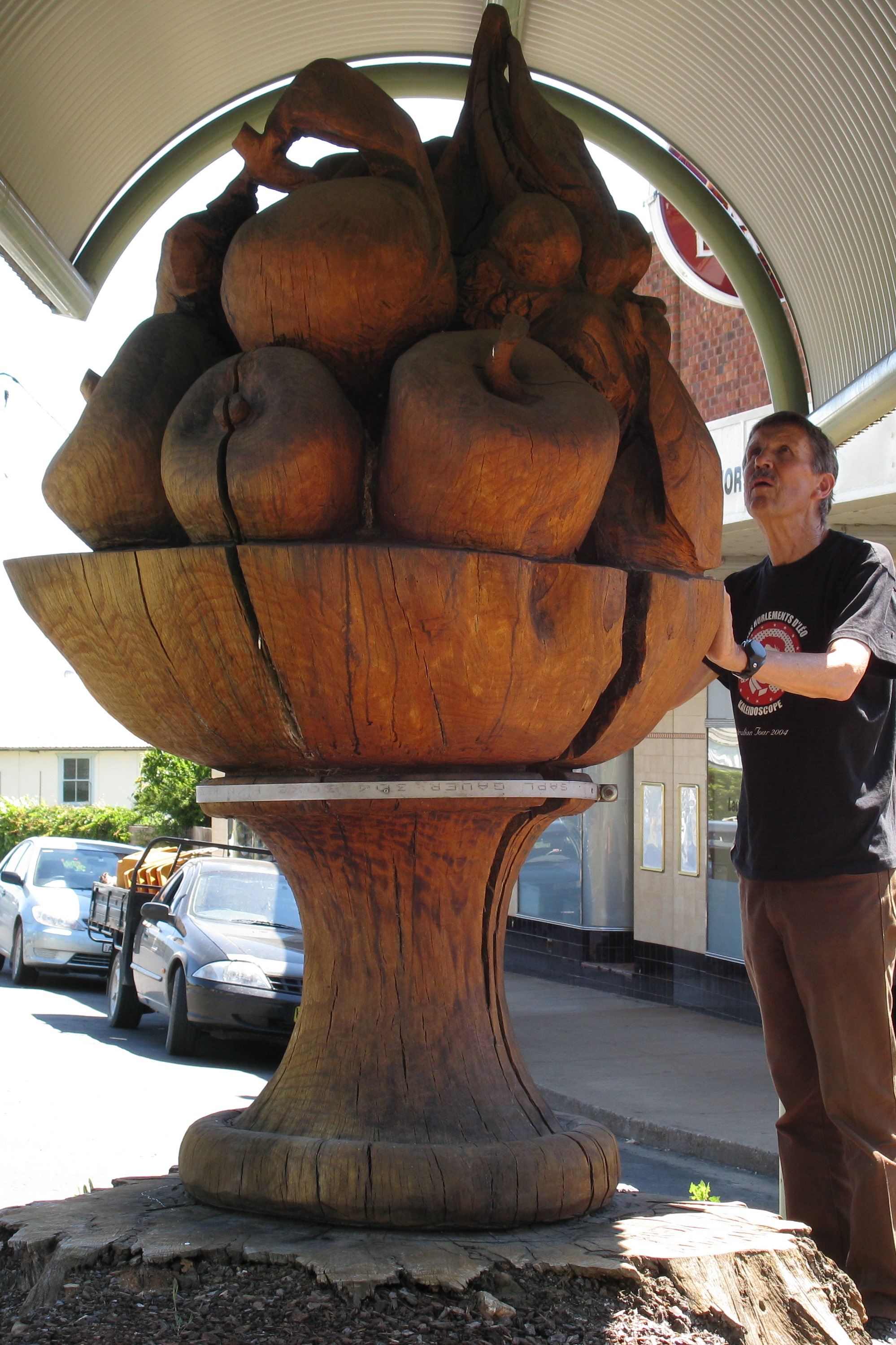
