= Khancoban =

- Town
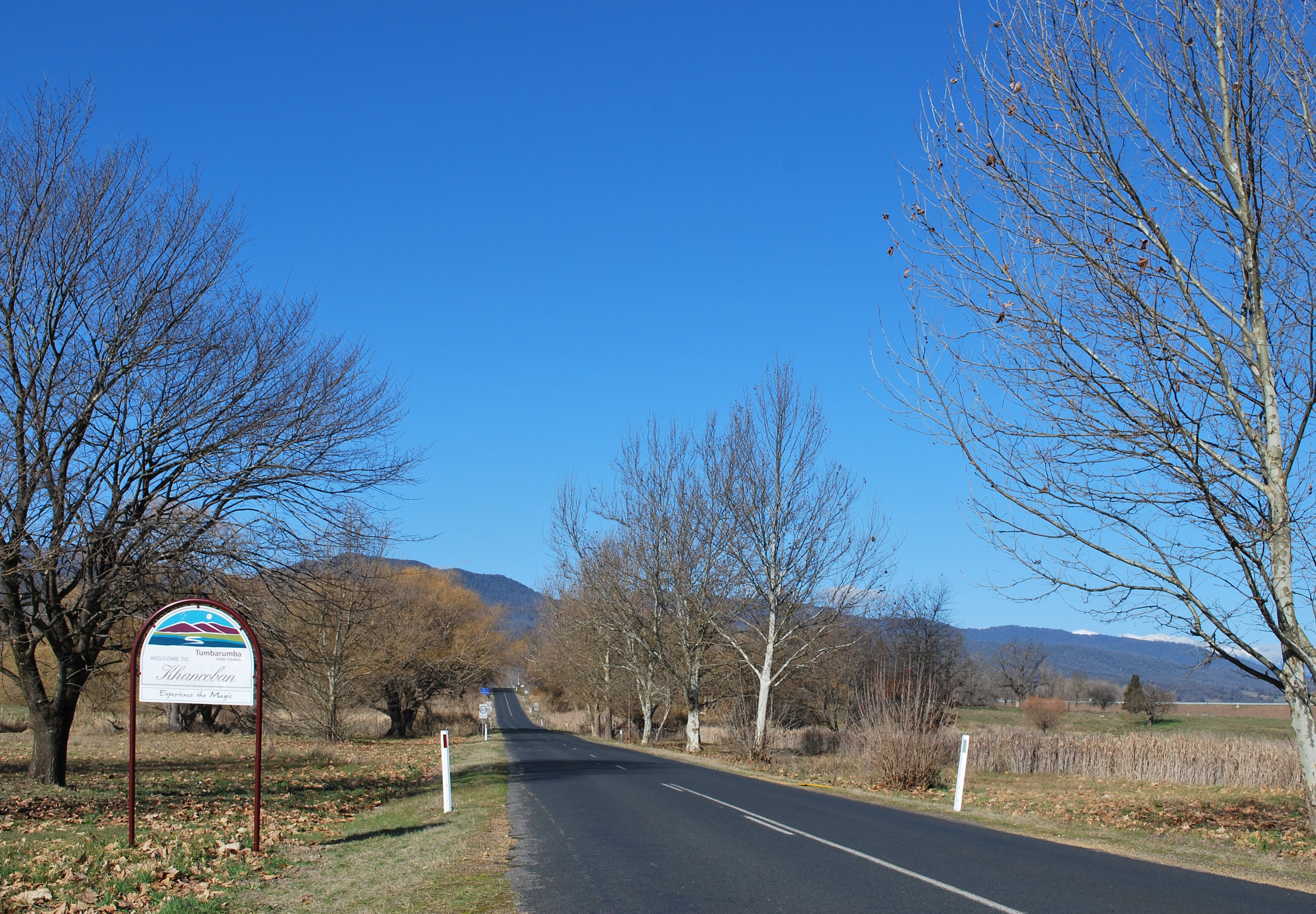
- Entrance to Khancoban

- Coordinates: 36°13′12″S 148°07′37″E
- Country: Australia
- State: New South Wales
- LGA: Snowy Valleys Council
- Location: 567 km (352 mi) SW of Sydney; 453 km (281 mi) NE of Melbourne; 151 km (94 mi) ESE of Albury; 76 km (47 mi) S of Tumbarumba; 20 km (12 mi) E of Corryong

Government
  - State electorate: Albury
  - Federal division: Riverina
- Elevation: 337.0 m (1,105.6 ft)

Population
  - Total: 319 (2021 census)
- Postcode: 2642
- County: Selwyn
- Mean max temp: 20.5 °C (68.9 °F)
- Mean min temp: 7.0 °C (44.6 °F)
- Annual rainfall: 963.5 mm (37.93 in)

Khancoban (/kænˈkoʊbən/) is a small town in Snowy Valleys Council, New South Wales, Australia. The town is located 567 kilometres (352 mi) from the state capital, Sydney and 13 kilometres (8 mi) from the state border with Victoria, in the western foothills of the Snowy Mountains, near the upper reaches of the Murray River in the South West Slopes. At the 2021 census, Khancoban had a population of 319.

Khancoban Post Office opened on 7 November 1876.

== Tourism ==
The town is a popular launching place for tourists exploring the Snowy Mountains area including Kosciuszko National Park. Khancoban is linked to Jindabyne and Cooma by the Alpine Way, a scenic route that takes travellers past the ski resort of Thredbo. The closest regional centre is Corryong, 20 kilometres (12 mi) to the west in Victoria.

== Sport and recreation ==
The Khancoban (Australian Rules) Football Club was initially formed in 1899 and played in the Upper Murray Football Association in 1899 and 1900. The club returned to the UMFA in 1908 and were runners up. The club was then in recess until 1961, when it merged with Tintaldra FC and played in the UMFL from 1962 to 1967, when the club folded.

Former Khancoban-Tintaldra FC player, Wennie Van Lint went on to play senior VFL football with South Melbourne in 1967.

The Khancoban Golf Club is a picturesque nine-hole grass greens course.

== Economy ==
Khancoban was constructed to house workers involved in the Snowy Mountains Scheme, Australia's largest engineering project, designed to provide hydro-electric power and water for irrigation to vast areas of the nation. The town is still mainly populated by workers employed by Snowy Hydro Limited working in places such as Murray 1 and Murray 2 Power Stations.

== Climate ==
Khancoban historically has had a temperate oceanic (Cfb) climate with four distinct seasons, though with more recent data it now qualifies for a humid subtropical (Cfa) climate. It is characterised by its inland location and likewise windward position (west of the Snowy Mountains); with the summers having a high diurnal range with often chilly mornings, and generally low humidity and rainfall amount—although thunderstorm buildup with a northerly airstream can occasionally give way to much higher dew points.

Winters are chilly, overcast and very rainy, with occasional snowfalls, and a much narrower diurnal range due to frequent cloud cover. Autumns are mild and dry, with crisp nights. Springs are mild and damp with often severe thunderstorms.

Climate data for Khancoban SMHEA (1961–1994); 337 m AMSL; 36.23° S, 148.14° E
Month	Jan	Feb	Mar	Apr	May	Jun	Jul	Aug	Sep	Oct	Nov	Dec	Year
Record high °C (°F)	41.7 (107.1)	41.7 (107.1)	37.6 (99.7)	34.4 (93.9)	26.4 (79.5)	20.0 (68.0)	19.5 (67.1)	23.3 (73.9)	28.3 (82.9)	30.8 (87.4)	38.5 (101.3)	39.1 (102.4)	41.7 (107.1)
Mean daily maximum °C (°F)	29.7 (85.5)	29.7 (85.5)	26.4 (79.5)	21.2 (70.2)	15.7 (60.3)	11.6 (52.9)	11.0 (51.8)	13.1 (55.6)	16.3 (61.3)	20.2 (68.4)	23.7 (74.7)	27.0 (80.6)	20.5 (68.9)
Mean daily minimum °C (°F)	12.8 (55.0)	13.0 (55.4)	10.4 (50.7)	7.0 (44.6)	4.2 (39.6)	1.8 (35.2)	1.3 (34.3)	2.6 (36.7)	4.4 (39.9)	6.8 (44.2)	8.9 (48.0)	11.3 (52.3)	7.0 (44.7)
Record low °C (°F)	1.8 (35.2)	3.5 (38.3)	−0.6 (30.9)	−2.4 (27.7)	−4.1 (24.6)	−8.0 (17.6)	−6.4 (20.5)	−5.6 (21.9)	−3.9 (25.0)	−1.8 (28.8)	−0.4 (31.3)	1.1 (34.0)	−8.0 (17.6)
Average precipitation mm (inches)	59.8 (2.35)	53.0 (2.09)	56.0 (2.20)	63.3 (2.49)	80.6 (3.17)	84.9 (3.34)	100.9 (3.97)	112.9 (4.44)	97.9 (3.85)	96.8 (3.81)	81.7 (3.22)	75.7 (2.98)	963.5 (37.91)
Average precipitation days (≥ 0.2 mm)	7.4	7.1	7.1	9.0	11.9	14.7	15.9	16.0	14.5	12.4	10.7	9.2	135.9
Average afternoon relative humidity (%)	34	34	37	48	61	71	68	59	55	48	43	42	50
Mean monthly sunshine hours	303.8	268.4	257.3	210.0	145.7	99.0	108.5	136.4	177.0	235.6	261.0	269.7	2,472.4
Source: Australian Bureau of Meteorology; Khancoban SMHEA

Climate data for Khancoban AWS (1997–2022); 339 m AMSL; 36.23° S, 148.14° E
Month	Jan	Feb	Mar	Apr	May	Jun	Jul	Aug	Sep	Oct	Nov	Dec	Year
Record high °C (°F)	43.3 (109.9)	43.3 (109.9)	38.0 (100.4)	32.5 (90.5)	25.4 (77.7)	20.0 (68.0)	19.0 (66.2)	22.1 (71.8)	28.0 (82.4)	33.8 (92.8)	38.0 (100.4)	41.1 (106.0)	43.3 (109.9)
Mean daily maximum °C (°F)	31.7 (89.1)	30.3 (86.5)	27.0 (80.6)	21.7 (71.1)	16.0 (60.8)	12.2 (54.0)	11.7 (53.1)	13.6 (56.5)	17.2 (63.0)	21.0 (69.8)	25.0 (77.0)	28.4 (83.1)	21.3 (70.4)
Mean daily minimum °C (°F)	13.7 (56.7)	13.3 (55.9)	10.7 (51.3)	7.3 (45.1)	4.2 (39.6)	2.2 (36.0)	1.7 (35.1)	2.7 (36.9)	4.6 (40.3)	6.6 (43.9)	9.5 (49.1)	11.3 (52.3)	7.3 (45.2)
Record low °C (°F)	4.0 (39.2)	3.0 (37.4)	−2.0 (28.4)	−1.4 (29.5)	−4.0 (24.8)	−4.2 (24.4)	−4.6 (23.7)	−5.0 (23.0)	−7.0 (19.4)	−1.3 (29.7)	0.0 (32.0)	2.2 (36.0)	−7.0 (19.4)
Average precipitation mm (inches)	60.0 (2.36)	60.2 (2.37)	63.2 (2.49)	57.3 (2.26)	68.7 (2.70)	95.8 (3.77)	89.0 (3.50)	106.5 (4.19)	88.6 (3.49)	80.4 (3.17)	92.2 (3.63)	74.6 (2.94)	936.5 (36.87)
Average precipitation days (≥ 0.2 mm)	7.7	7.9	8.5	8.8	14.6	19.6	20.2	18.3	14.2	11.8	11.1	9.3	152.0
Average afternoon relative humidity (%)	31	33	34	43	57	69	69	61	55	49	43	35	48
Source: Australian Bureau of Meteorology; Khancoban AWS

== Gallery ==
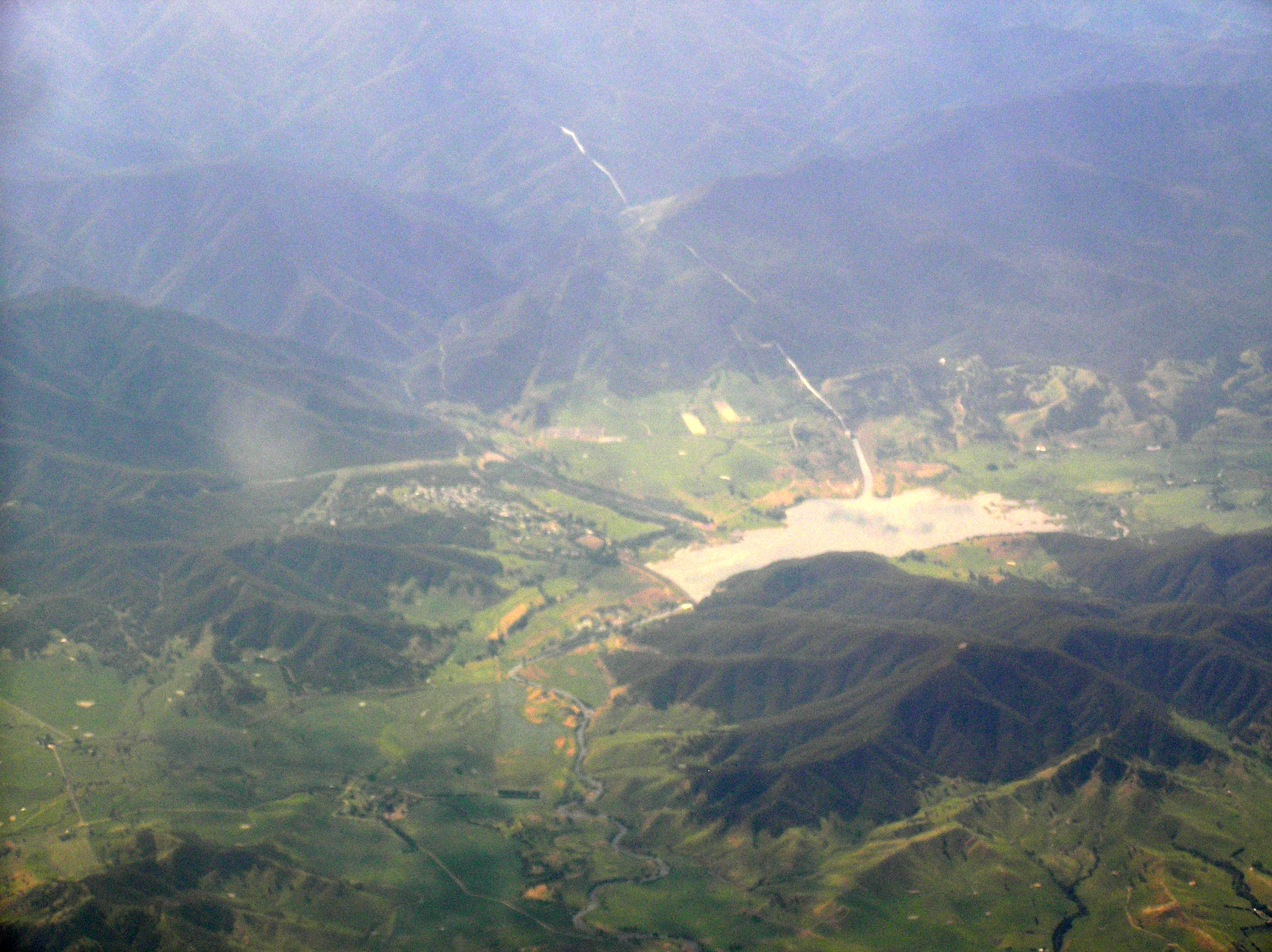
Aerial photo

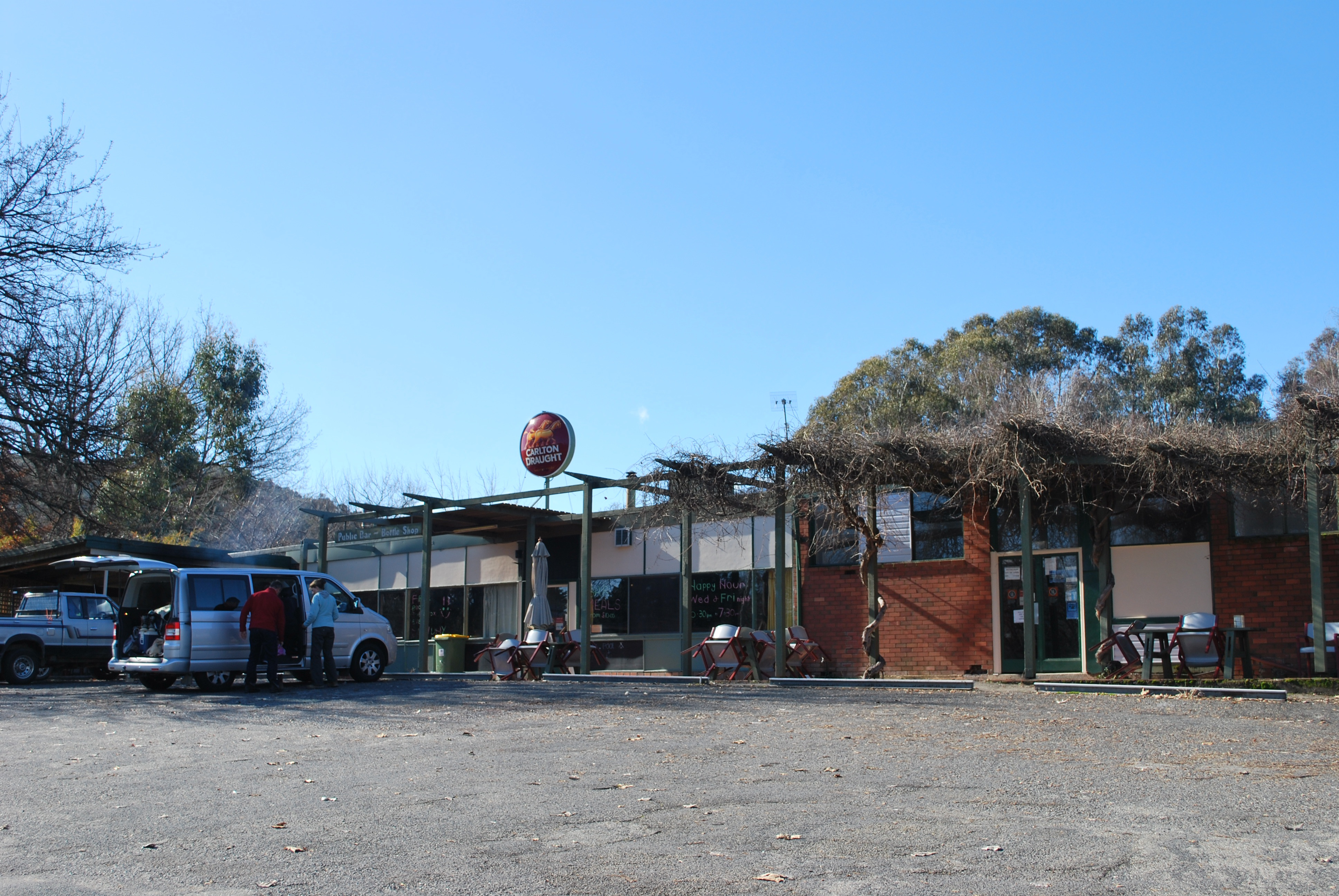
Khancoban Hotel

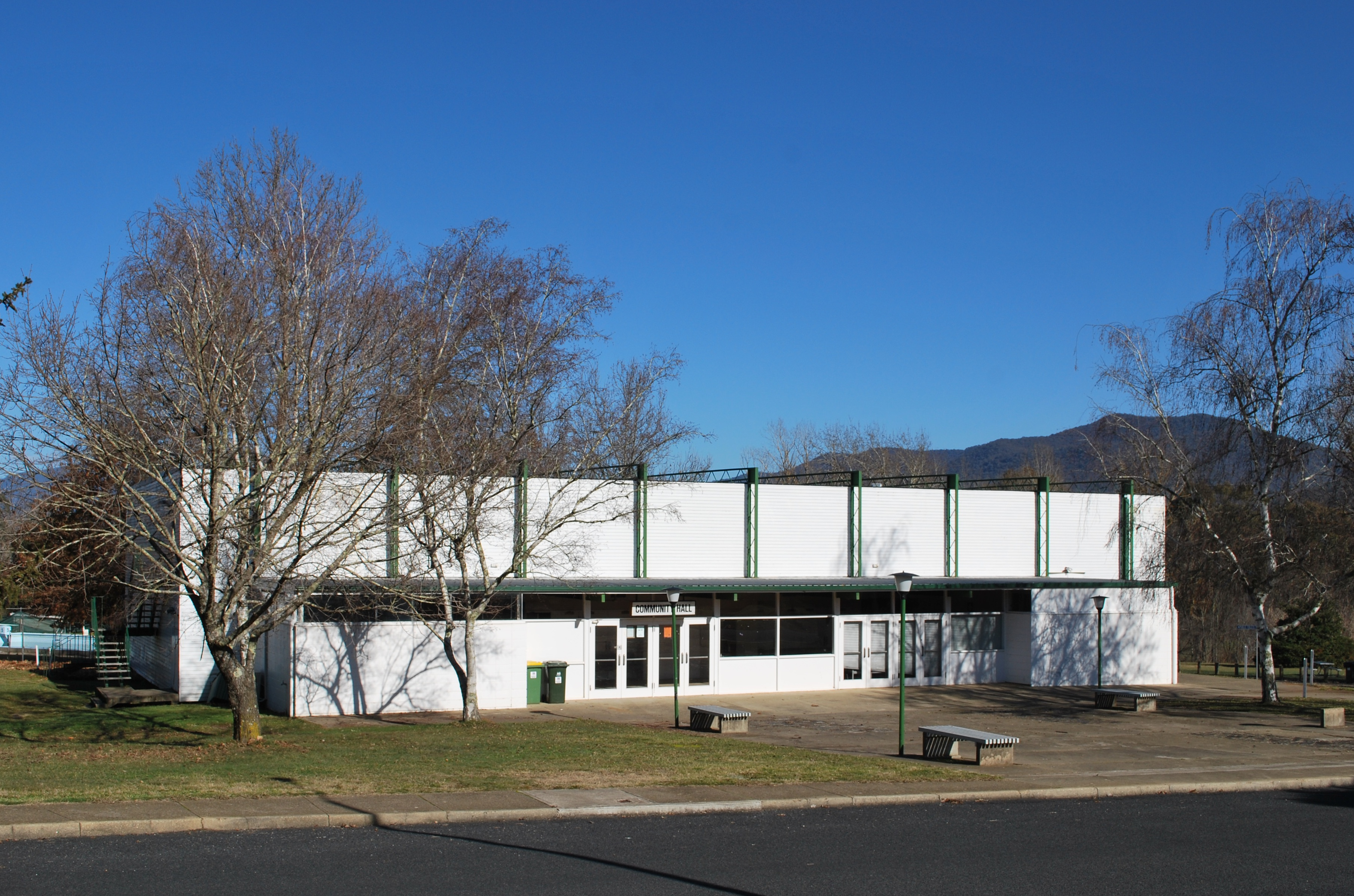
Community hall
