= Talbingo =

- Town
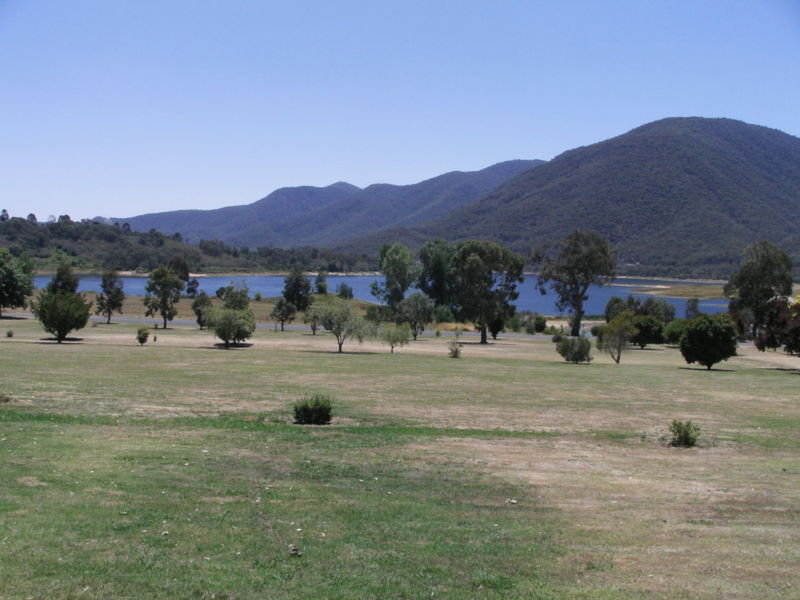
- Overlooking the Talbingo golf course towards Jounama Dam (December 2005)

- Coordinates: 35°34′0″S 148°18′0″E
- Country: Australia
- State: New South Wales
- LGA: Snowy Valleys Council
- Location: 454 km (282 mi) SW of Sydney

Government
  - State electorate: Wagga Wagga
  - Federal division: Riverina
- Elevation: 410 m (1,350 ft)

Population
  - Total: 224 (2021 census)
- Postcode: 2720
- County: Wallace

Talbingo is a small town in New South Wales, Australia at the edge of the Snowy Mountains on the Snowy Mountains Highway. The town is 410 metres above sea level. It is on the Tumut River, which has been inundated by Jounama Pondage.

Talbingo resident Jack Bridle, whose family were early European settlers of the area, suggests the name to be a corruption of the English word "tall" and the Aboriginal words "Binji", "Binge" or "Bingo" meaning belly. Mount Talbingo resembles the big belly of a man lying down.

== History ==
The Talbingo Run of 10,000 acres (4,000 ha) was established by William Bridle (1827–1922) in 1850.

Talbingo Post Office opened on 6 June 1898 and closed in 1913 before reopening in 1965 in its new location. The original township was flooded under Jounama Pondage in 1968. The town was moved to make way for the Snowy Mountains Hydro-Electric Scheme.

Before the move, Talbingo consisted of a hotel, the station and its homestead. There was also a service station and some holiday cabins. It was a small settlement and only five families were displaced by the move.

Talbingo station was the birthplace of author Miles Franklin. The station belonged to her relatives, the Lampes, until the 1940s.

=== Snowy Mountains Scheme ===
Jounama Pondage was completed in 1968. Jounama Dam is a rockfill dam, 43.9m tall, with a crest length of 518.2m and an embankment volume of 554,500 cubic metres. The modern township of Talbingo is located on the shores of Jounama and construction of the dam flooded the historic valley and Talbingo township below, which was the birthplace of author Miles Franklin and location of the Talbingo Hotel.

== Present status ==
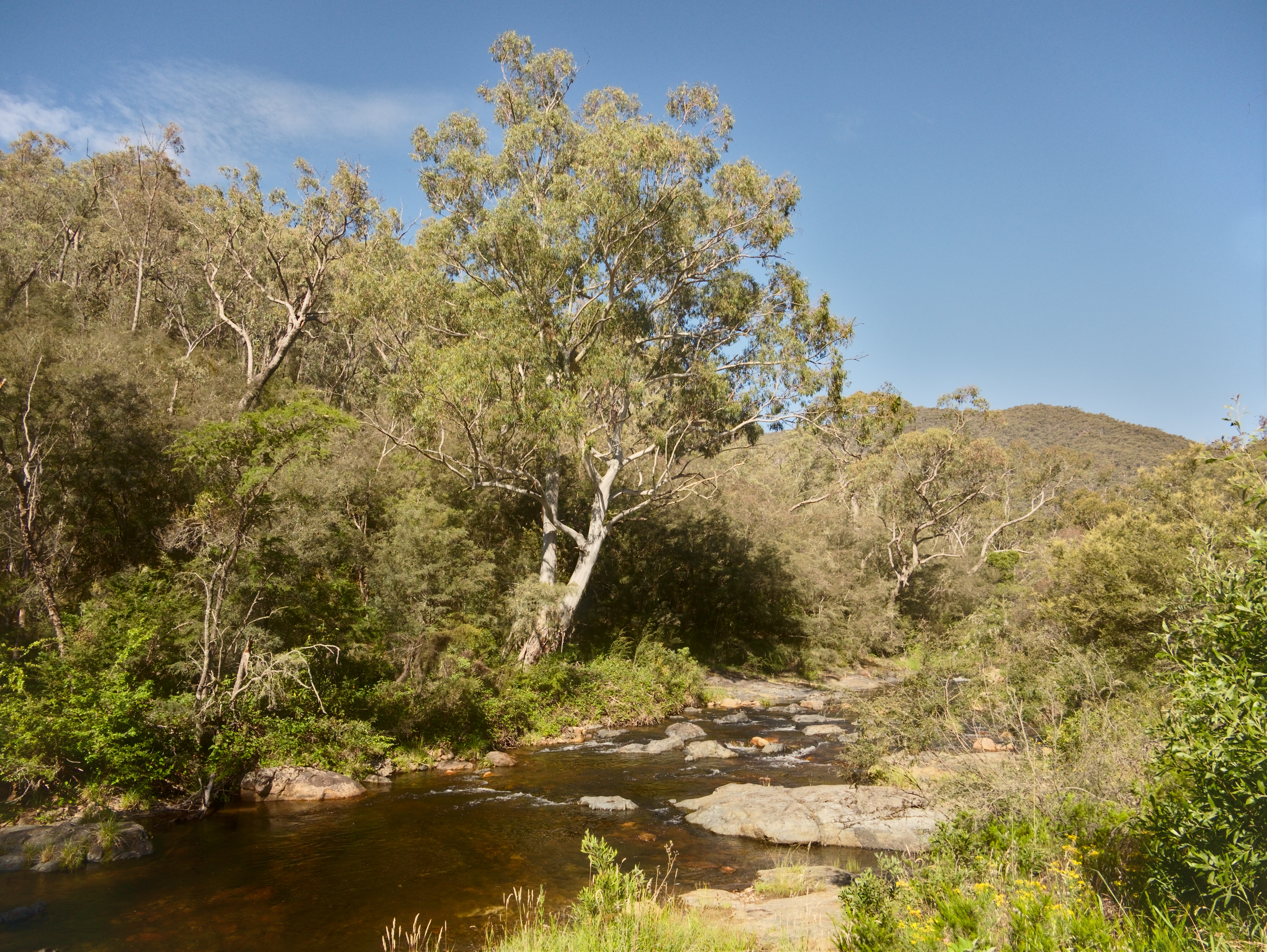
Jounama Creek, near Talbingo

Talbingo grew rapidly while Tumut 3 power station was built, and now has a service station, golf course, motel, primary school, general store, country club, ski hire shop, Tourist Park and the lodge has been refurbished and now has accommodation and a restaurant. The caravan park has cabins, camp grounds and amenities, including camp kitchen.

Tourism is the lifeblood of the village. Many families stop by every summer for water skiing on Talbingo or Blowering Dam, bushwalking and exploring Kosciuszko National Park. In the winter, Talbingo becomes a hub for those visiting Selwyn Snowfields and other ski fields.

The Church of St Paul, at 50 Lampe St, Talbingo, was built by the Snowy Mountains Authority as a multi-faith Christian church, and was opened and consecrated by representatives of the Catholic, Anglican, and Presbyterian faiths on 23 April 1967. Apart from the tall windows behind the lectern and altar, which give a view to the lake and mountains, it is largely unadorned. Traditional pews seat approximately 400 people.

== Gallery ==
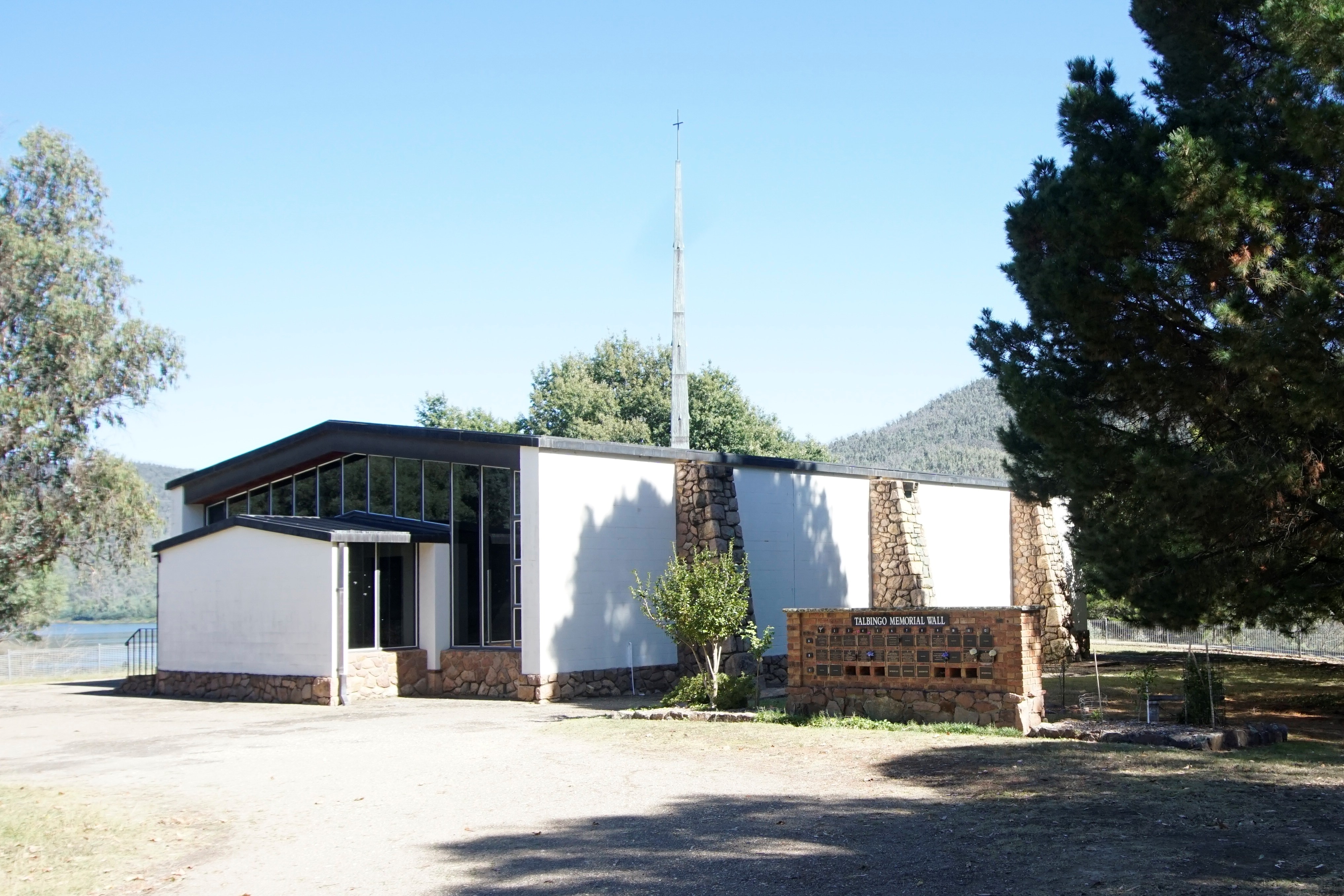
Church of St Paul

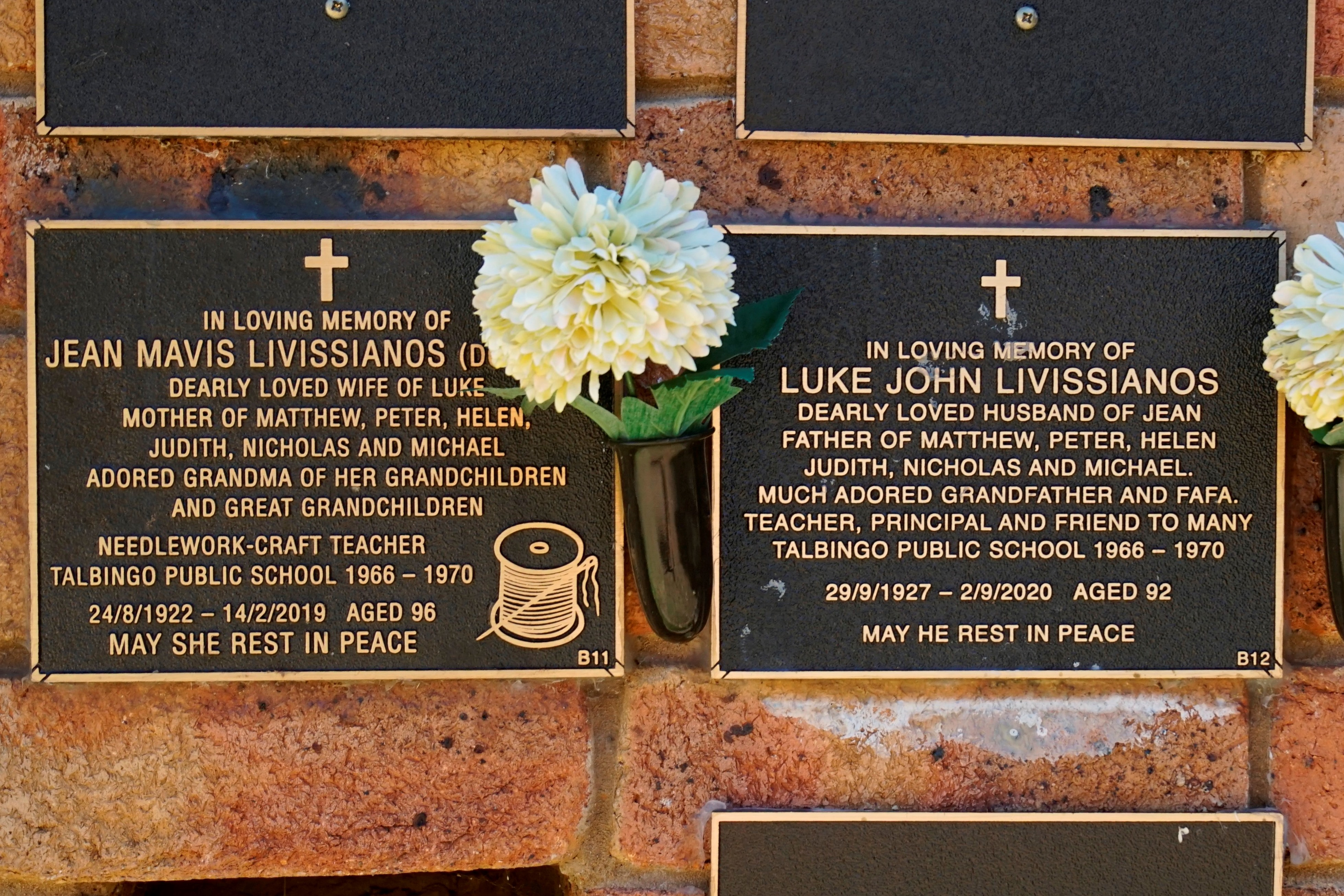
Memorial wall detail

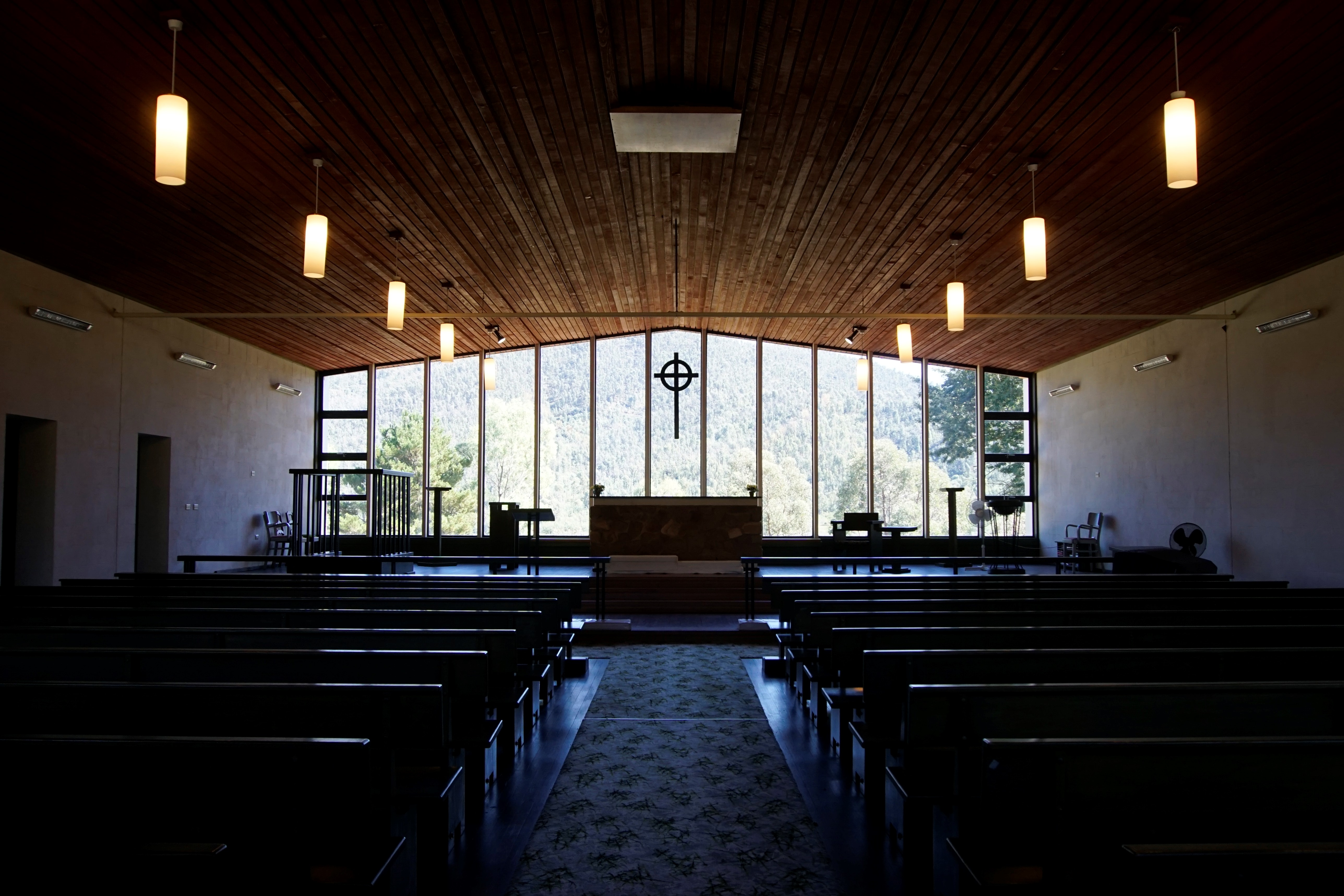
Inside the church

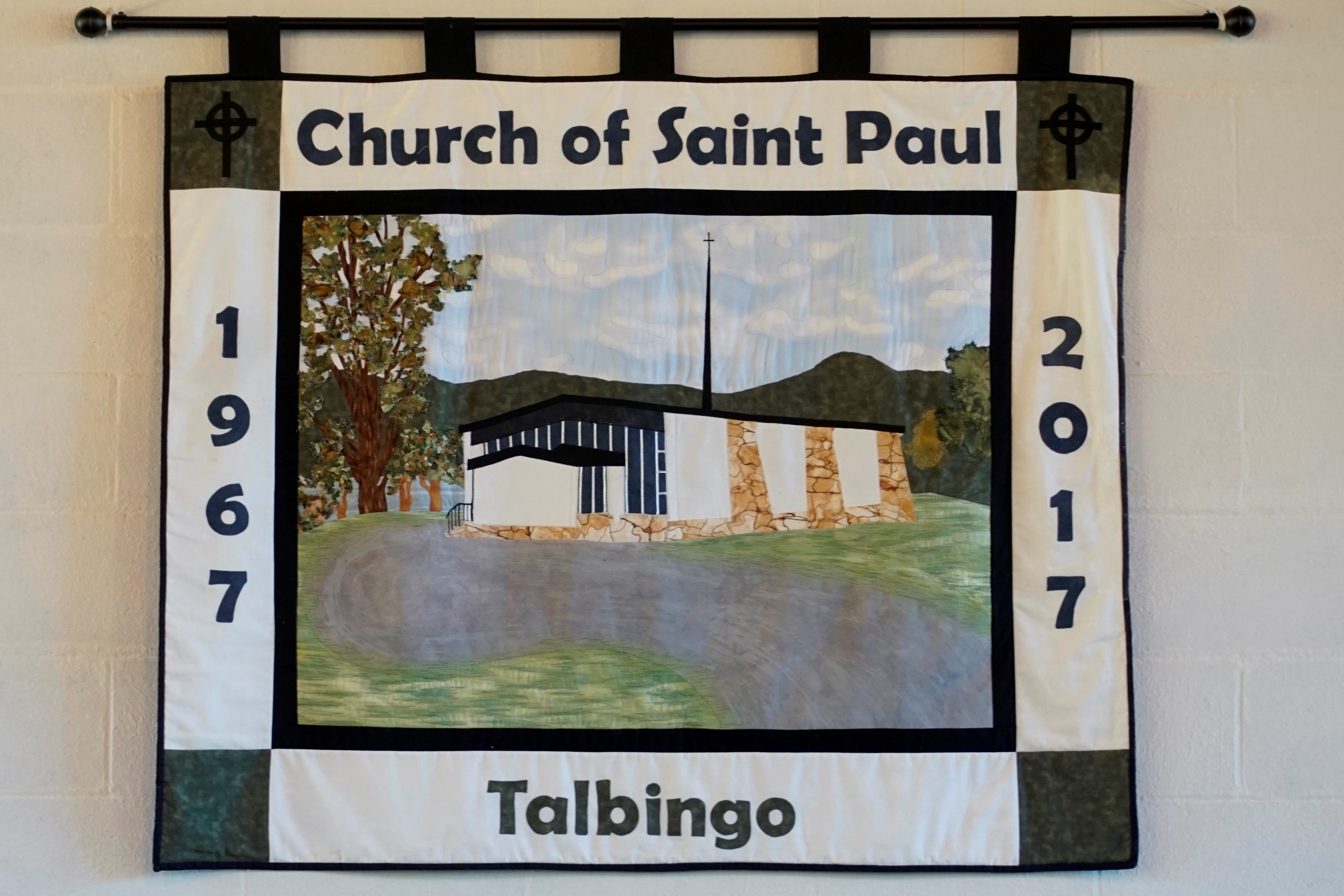
Wall hanging

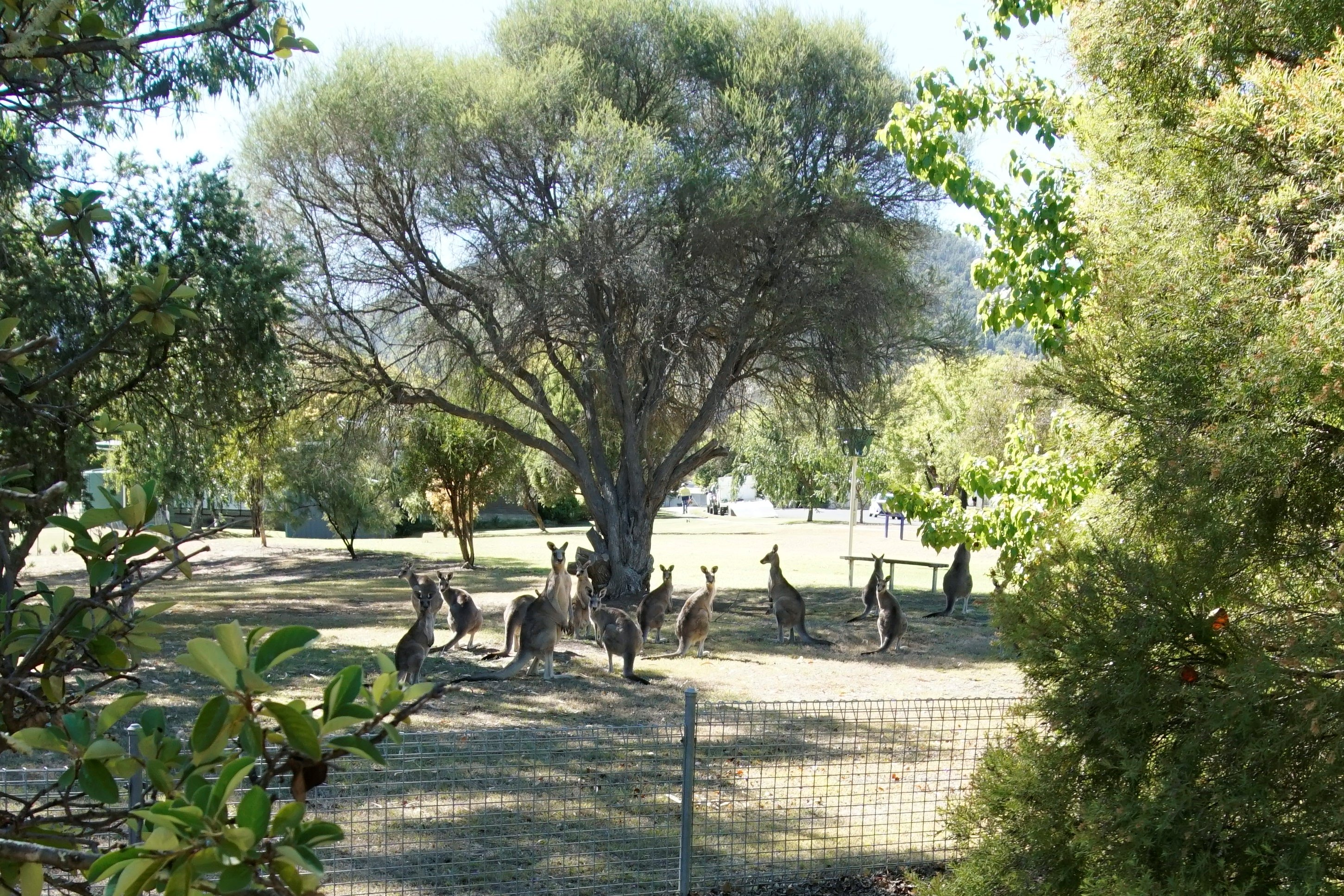
Miles Franklin Park

== See also ==
- Snowy Scheme Museum
