= Little River, New South Wales =

Little River New South Wales
- Coordinates: 35°19′25″S 148°17′5″E
- Population: 38 (2021 census)
- Postcode(s): 2720
- Location: 6 km (4 mi) E of Tumut
- LGA(s): Snowy Valleys Council
- County: Wynyard
- State electorate(s): Wagga Wagga
- Federal division(s): Riverina
Localities around Little River:
	Lacmalac
Tumut	Little River
Tumut Plains

Little River is a rural locality in the Snowy Valleys Council local government area of New South Wales, Australia. It lies is 6 km east of Tumut, in the southern side of the valley of the Goobarragandra River, just to the east of the confluence of that river with the Tumut River. The Goobarragandra River was once also known as 'Tumut Little River' or just as 'Little River', giving rise to the locality's name. At the 2021 census, it had a population of 38.

It lies close to the boundaries of the traditional lands of Wiradjuri, Ngarigo-speaking Walgalu and the Ngunnawal peoples.

A part of the localities now known as Little River and Lacmalac was one of the sites proposed for Australia's national capital city. It was one of two sites near Tumut; the other being at Gadara to the west of Tumut. If the proposal for a new city at Little River had come to fruition, the Tumut railway line would have been extended to the area and a dam built on Goobarragandra River to provide a water supply.

== Census populations ==
Little River, New South Wales
Year	Population	Source(s)
2016	47	
2021	38	
