= Doubtful River =

Doubtful River may refer to:

- Doubtful River (New South Wales), Australia, a tributary of Tumut River
- Doubtful River (New Zealand), New Zealand, a tributary of Boyle River
