= Lacmalac =

- Town
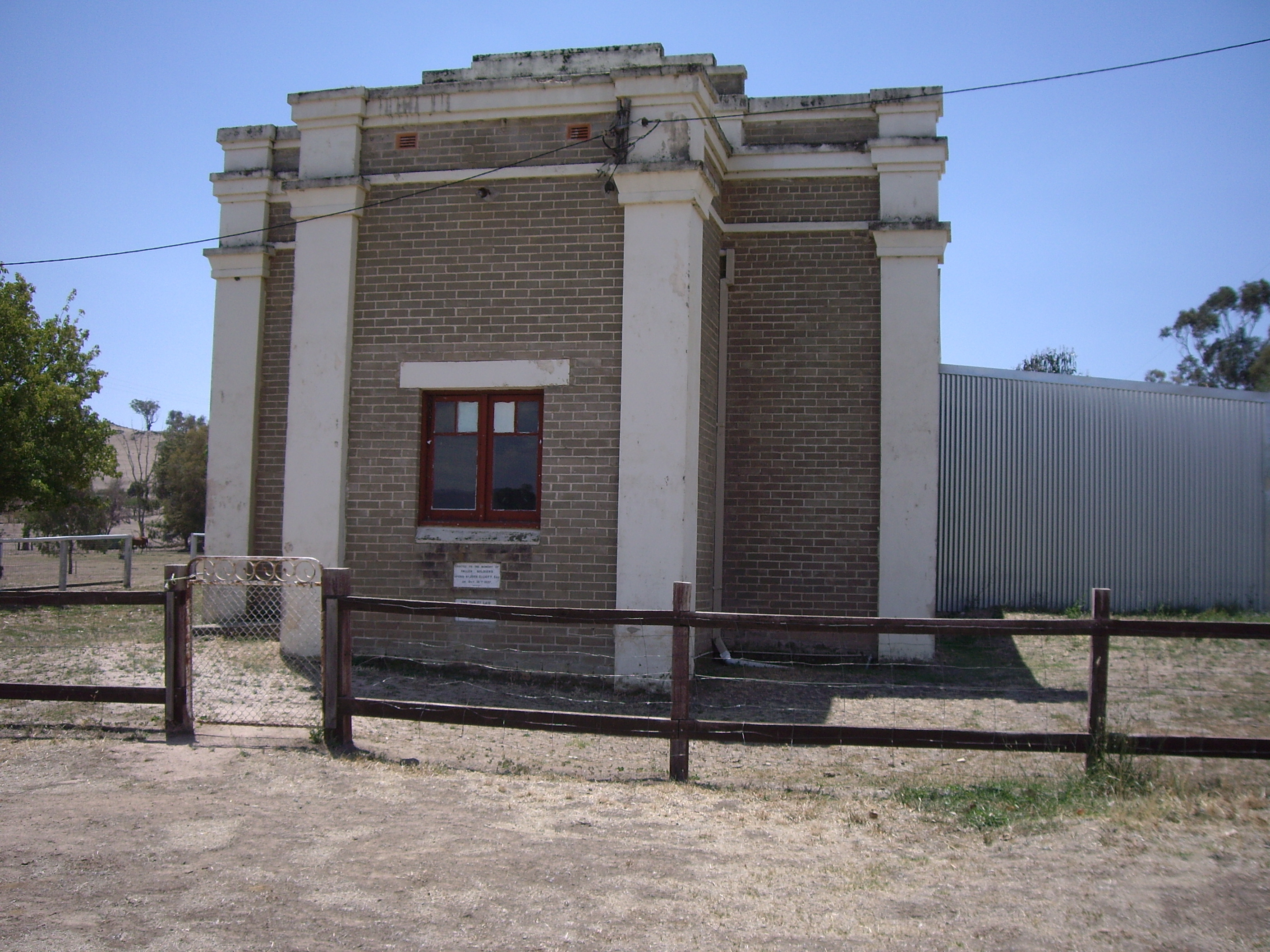
- Lacmalac Hall

- Coordinates: 35°19′06″S 148°19′32″E
- Country: Australia
- State: New South Wales
- Location: 9 km (5.6 mi) from Tumut; 19 km (12 mi) from Gocup

Government
  - State electorate: Wagga Wagga
- Elevation: 374 m (1,227 ft)

Population
  - Total: 146 (SAL 2021)
- Postcode: 2720
- County: Buccleuch

Lacmalac is a rural community in the central east part of the Riverina. It is situated by road, about 9 kilometres east of Tumut and 19 kilometres south east of Gocup.

A part of the localities now known as Lacmalac and Little River was one of the sites proposed for Australia's national capital city. it was one of two sites near Tumut; the other being at Gadara to the west of Tumut. If the proposal for a new city at Little River-Laclamac had come to fruition, the Tumut railway line would have been extended to the area and a dam built on Goobarragandra River to provide a water supply.

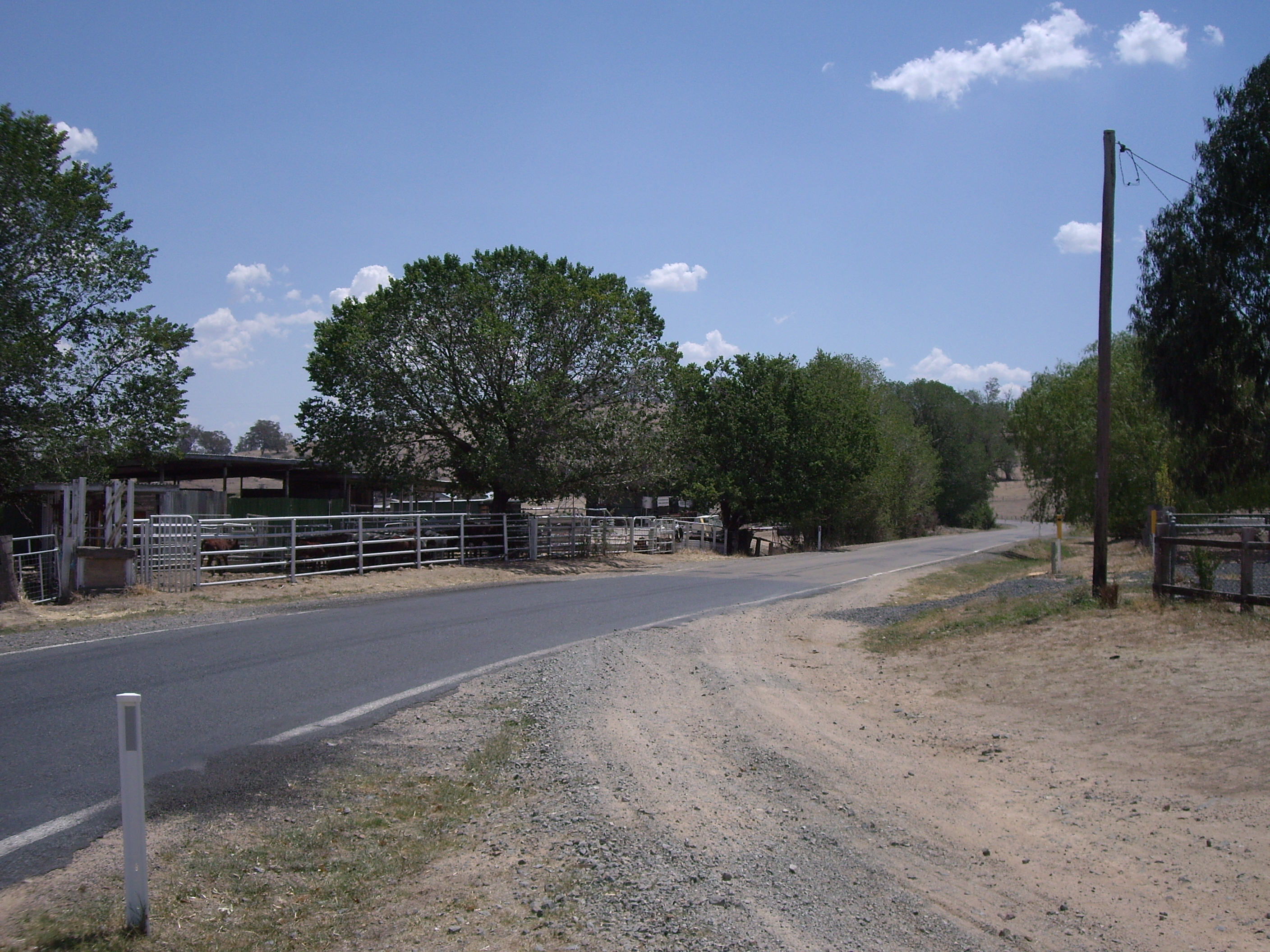
Lacmalac
