= Kunama =

Kunama may refer to:

- Kunama, New South Wales, a rural locality
- Kunama people
- Kunama language
