= Tumut railway station =

Railway station in Tumut LGA, New South Wales, Australia

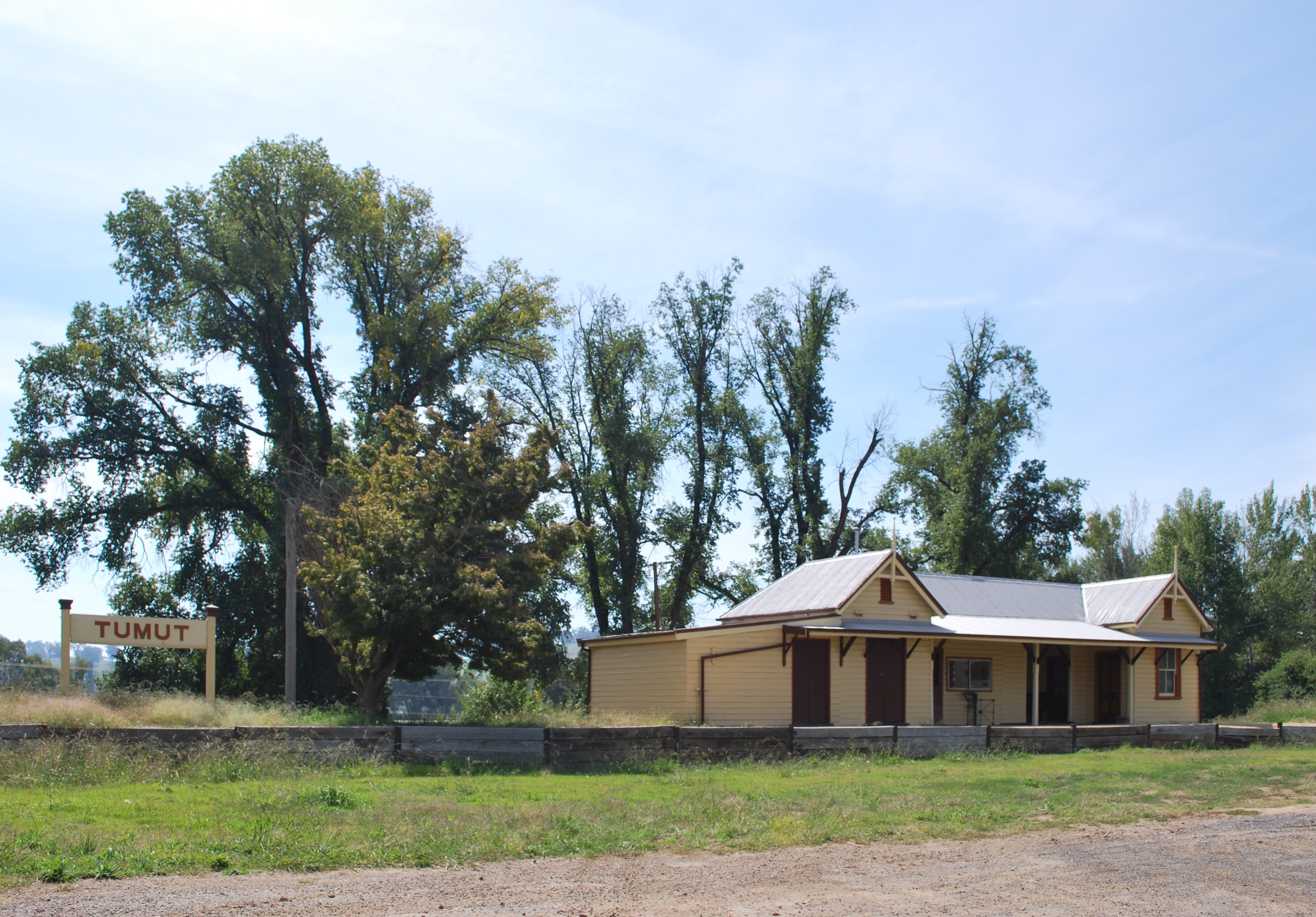
- Tumut railway station, pictured in 2010

- Location within New South Wales Location within Australia
- 35°17′44″S 148°12′36″E
- Location: Cootamundra–Tumut and Kunama line, Tumut, Snowy Valleys Council, New South Wales, Australia

Site notes
- Owner: Transport Asset Manager of New South Wales

New South Wales Heritage Register
- Official name: Tumut Railway Station group
- Type: State heritage (complex / group)
- Designated: 2 April 1999
- Reference no.: 1273
- Type: Railway Platform/Station
- Category: Transport – Rail

The Tumut railway station is a heritage-listed former railway station and railway staff accommodation and now private houses located on the Cootamundra–Tumut and Kunama line in Tumut, in the Snowy Valleys Council local government area of New South Wales, Australia. It is also known as the Tumut Railway Station group. The property was added to the New South Wales State Heritage Register on 2 April 1999.

== Description ==
The complex compromises a type 16 timber pioneer station building that was completed in 1903. The station master's type 7, J3 timber residence adjoins the station, with a lamp room and WC and corrugated iron curved roof was also completed in 1903. A goods shed, comprising a 11.0-by-4.9-metre (36 ft × 16 ft) side shed with awning and corrugated iron

== Heritage listing ==
Tumut station is a good example of a pioneer station with some remnants of the former yard. Despite losing the platform face, the building is in good condition and is one of the few pioneer buildings to survive in the State. The other elements support the main building, particularly the residence which is one of the best surviving example of this style of residence. All the elements of the group are in excellent condition and are very good examples of a pioneer station complex. The building has a prominent place in the town of Tumut and is important in the history of the town and the area as the construction of the railway was a major achievement.

Tumut railway station was listed on the New South Wales State Heritage Register on 2 April 1999 having satisfied the following criteria.

The place possesses uncommon, rare or endangered aspects of the cultural or natural history of New South Wales.

This item is assessed as historically rare. This item is assessed as arch. rare. This item is assessed as socially rare.

== See also ==
- List of railway stations in New South Wales
