= Tumut Plains =

- Suburb
- Coordinates: 35°19′54″S 148°16′04″E
- Country: Australia
- State: New South Wales
- LGA: Snowy Valleys Council

Population
  - Total: 60 (2016 census)
- Postcode: 2720
Suburbs around Tumut Plains
Tumut	Lacmalac	Little River
Tumut	Tumut Plains	Little River
Tumut	Wermatong	Wermatong

Tumut Plains is a locality in the Snowy Valleys Council, New South Wales, Australia. In the 2016 census, Tumut Plains had a population of 60 people.

== Heritage listings ==
Tumut Plains has a number of heritage-listed sites, including:

- Tumut Plains Road: Junction Bridge, Tumut
