= Tumut =

- Town
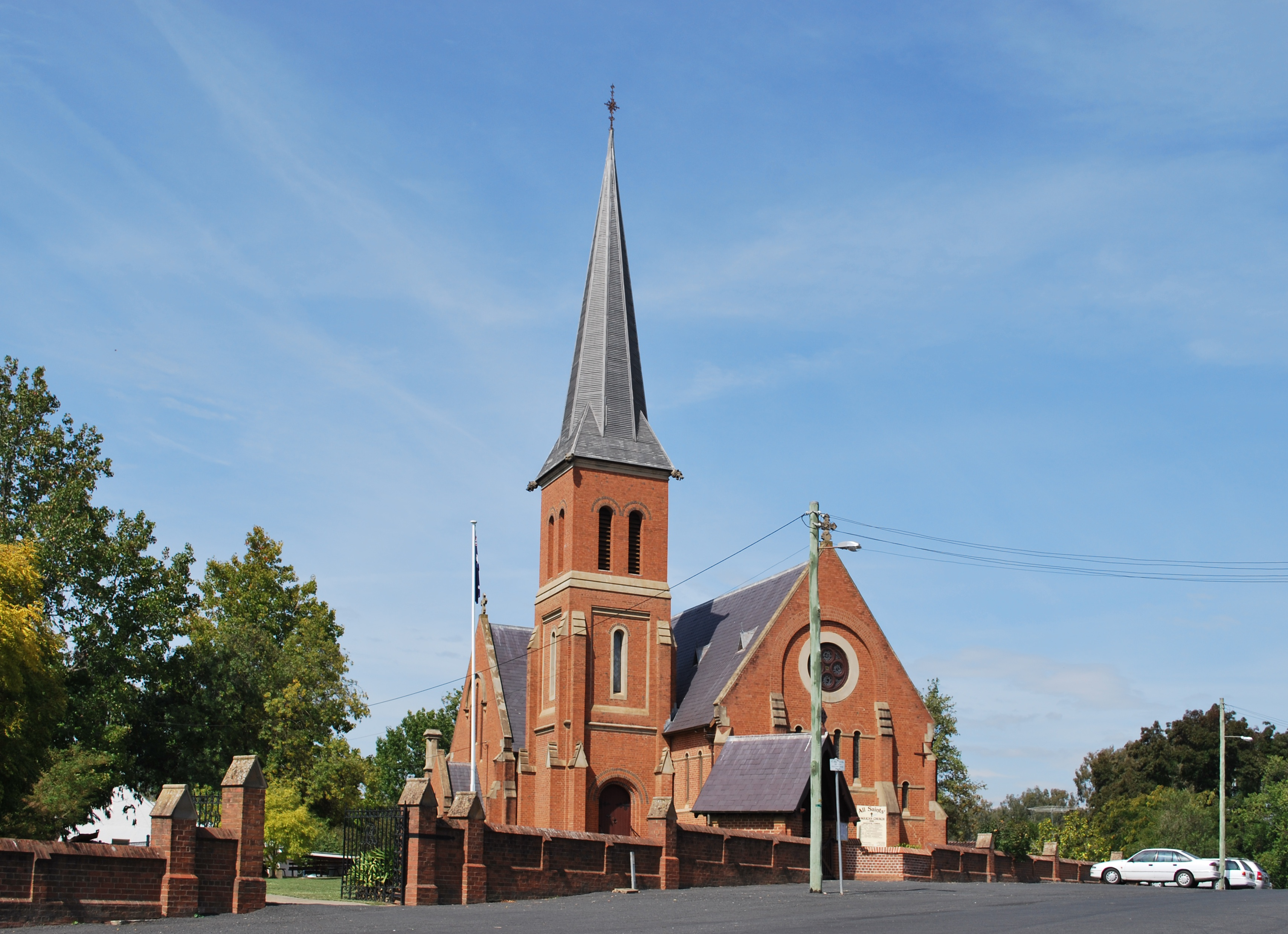
- All Saints Anglican Church, Tumut

- Coordinates: 35°18′17″S 148°13′22″E
- Country: Australia
- State: New South Wales
- LGA: Snowy Valleys Council
- Location: 411 km (255 mi) SW of Sydney; 525 km (326 mi) NE of Melbourne; 196 km (122 mi) W of Canberra

Government
  - State electorate: Wagga Wagga
  - Federal division: Riverina
- Elevation: 305.0 m (1,000.7 ft)

Population
  - Total: 6,631 (2021 census)
- Postcode: 2720
- County: Wynyard
- Mean max temp: 21.8 °C (71.2 °F)
- Mean min temp: 6.7 °C (44.1 °F)
- Annual rainfall: 790.4 mm (31.12 in)
Localities around Tumut
Gilmore	Gocup	Bombowlee
Wereboldera	Tumut	Lacmalac
Wereboldera	Jones Bridge	Tumut Plains

Tumut (/ˈtjuːmət/) is a town in the Riverina region of New South Wales, Australia, situated on the banks of the Tumut River.

Tumut sits on the north-west foothills of the Snowy Mountains and is located on the traditional lands of the Wiradjuri, Wolgalu and Ngunnawal Aboriginal peoples.

Tumut is often referred to as the 'gateway to the snowy' Snowy Mountains Scheme. The former Tumut Shire was administered from offices located in the town. Tumut is approximately 410 kilometres (250 mi) south-west of Sydney and 525 kilometres (330 mi) north-east of Melbourne.

Tumut is home to a number of historic buildings, including an Anglican church designed by Edmund Blacket and a Courthouse designed by James Barnet. Many of the pubs in the town have been in use from the mid to late 1800s.

Early settlers established many European deciduous trees throughout the area. The stand of Poplars, Elm and Willow, amongst others, create a well renowned display of colour over autumn. Tumut celebrates this with the yearly Festival of the Falling Leaf.

== Etymology ==
The word Tumut is derived from a possibly Wiradjuri indigenous word for the area, possibly doo-maaht or doormat, meaning "a quiet resting place by the river".

== History ==
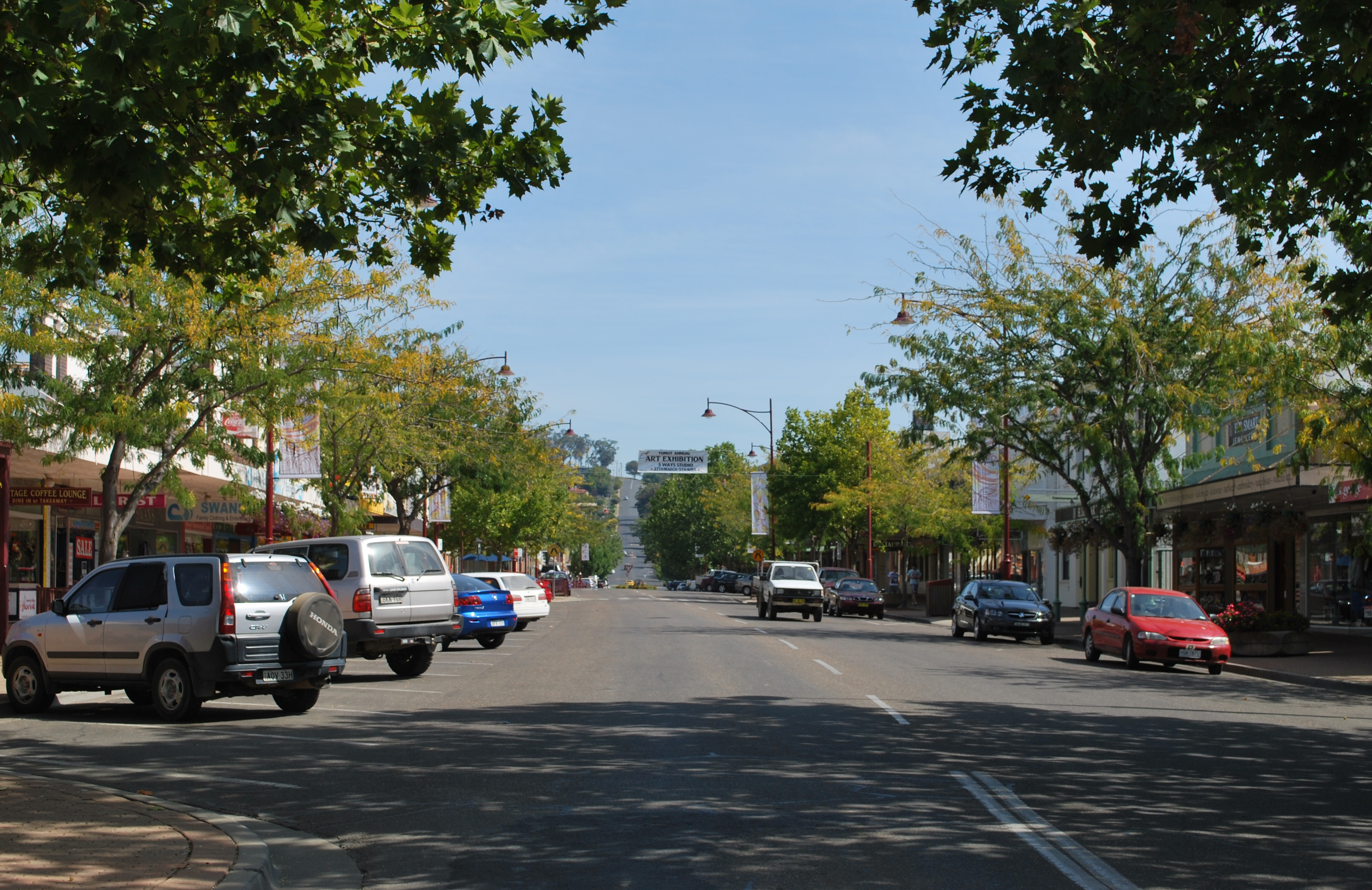
Wynyard Street

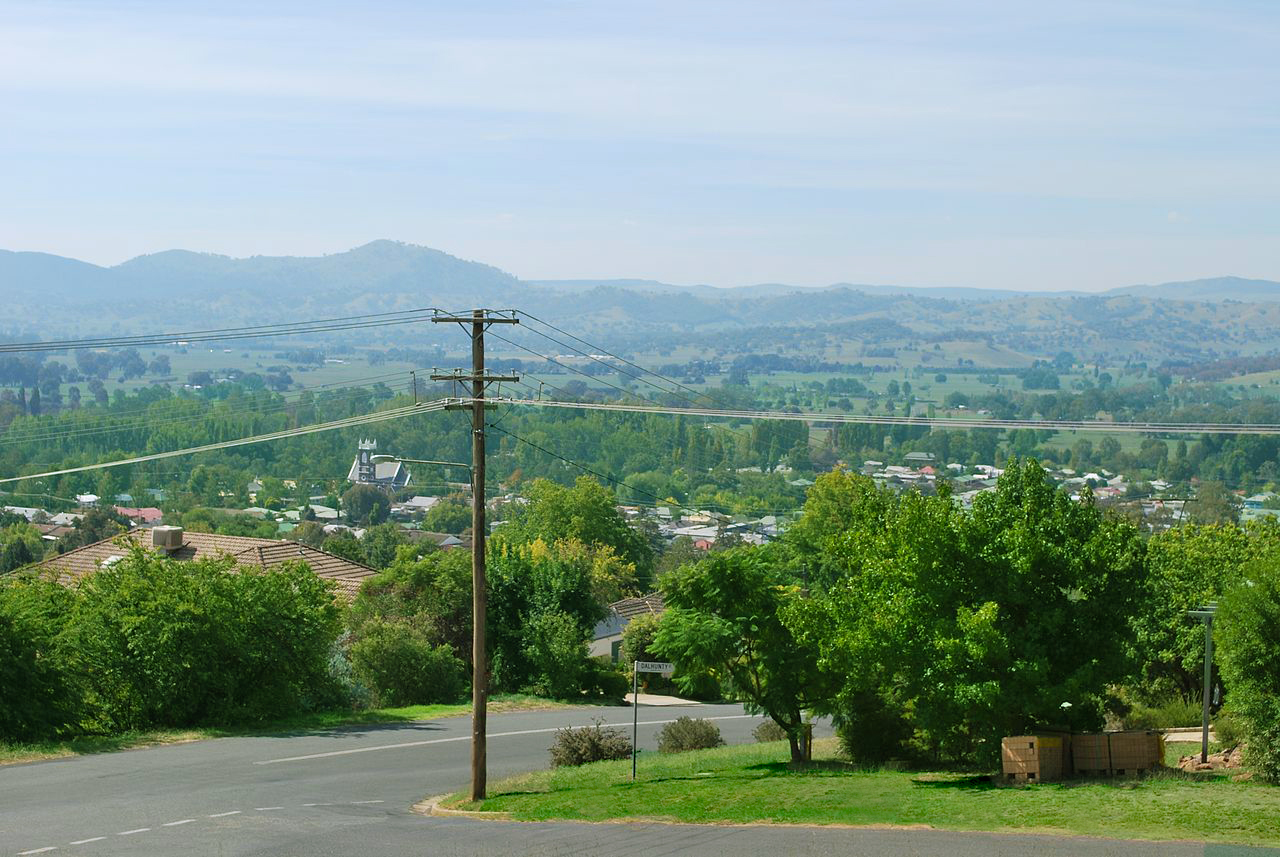
The town from the Rotary Lookout

The area's rivers may have been the boundaries or connection-points of the three traditional owners linked to this 'country'. During summertime, the high country was a meeting place for tribes, with bogong moths being an abundant food source in the warmer months.

British pastoralists began take the land in the area during the 1830s. In 1845, a Court of Petty Sessions was established at Tumut with Frederick Walker appointed as the inaugural magistrate. Walker later became notorious as the first commandant of the Native Police force based mostly in Queensland.

Tumut Post Office opened 1 January 1849. A public hospital opened in the town in 1900. After many years of lobbying by the local community, construction of the railway line from Gundagai began in 1901, reaching Tumut by 1903 with the first train arriving on 2 December that year. A further extension was built to Batlow and Kunama from a junction at Gilmore, a few kilometres southwest of Tumut. Train services were progressively reduced in the early 1980s before the final trains to Cootamundra ran in January 1984 before being suspended when flood damage to the line was deemed not economical to repair.

Tumut was one of the ten areas short-listed in 1908 as a site for the Australian Capital Territory. Other locations that were short-listed include Albury, Armidale, Bombala, Dalgety, Lake George, Lyndhurst, Orange, Tooma and Yass-Canberra.

The site of the new capital city would not have been the existing town of Tumut. It seems two sites near Tumut for a new city were proposed; one to the east of Tumut, at a site in the valley of Goobarragandra River, which is now part of the localities of Little River and Lacmalac, and another site between Tumut and Adelong, near Gadara, under which Tumut itself would have become a part of the new Federal Territory. Planning work occurred for both sites.

An earlier vote following inspections of potential sites in 1902 saw the new Federal House of Representatives vote in favour of Tumut as the location for the capital, however the Senate favoured Bombala so no consensus was reached. When federal parliamentarians put the final decision to a series of nine elimination ballots, in October 1908, Tumut was eliminated in the fifth ballot.

The town's rugby league team competed in the Riverina Maher Cup competition, beginning as a fixture between teams from Gundagai and Tumut under rugby union rules in 1920, before switching to league rules in 1921.

== Climate ==
Tumut is considerably wetter than other low-lying towns on the South West Slopes, owing to its location at the immediate foot of the Brindabella Range. Warm to hot, dry summers (though with chilly nights) and cool, wet winters characterise its climate. Occasionally, snow can occur during the winter months, with the most recent significant snowfall having occurred in August 2019, where snow covered the ground across the township. Cold rain below 5 °C (41 °F) occurs with some regularity in the winter months. On average there are 113.2 clear days annually; with the grand majority in summer and early autumn, while the winter tends to be cloudy. Under the Köppen climate classification scheme, the town is located in transitional areas between the humid subtropical (Cfa) and oceanic climates (Cfb).

Rainfall records began in 1883 at Adelong (Tumut St), but temperature records not until 1907, and temperature extremes not until 1965. Temperature records ceased in 1994, but those of rainfall continued to 2020 before ceasing.

Climate data for Adelong (Tumut St, 1907–1994, rainfall 1883–2020); 333 m AMSL; 35.31° S, 148.06° E
Month	Jan	Feb	Mar	Apr	May	Jun	Jul	Aug	Sep	Oct	Nov	Dec	Year
Record high °C (°F)	42.6 (108.7)	42.8 (109.0)	41.1 (106.0)	31.1 (88.0)	26.1 (79.0)	23.3 (73.9)	23.0 (73.4)	25.7 (78.3)	31.7 (89.1)	33.3 (91.9)	39.0 (102.2)	40.3 (104.5)	42.8 (109.0)
Mean daily maximum °C (°F)	30.7 (87.3)	30.4 (86.7)	27.3 (81.1)	22.0 (71.6)	17.2 (63.0)	13.5 (56.3)	12.5 (54.5)	14.3 (57.7)	17.8 (64.0)	21.4 (70.5)	25.2 (77.4)	28.8 (83.8)	21.8 (71.2)
Mean daily minimum °C (°F)	12.9 (55.2)	13.4 (56.1)	10.5 (50.9)	6.3 (43.3)	3.7 (38.7)	1.6 (34.9)	0.9 (33.6)	2.0 (35.6)	3.7 (38.7)	5.9 (42.6)	8.5 (47.3)	11.0 (51.8)	6.7 (44.1)
Record low °C (°F)	2.5 (36.5)	3.0 (37.4)	−1.1 (30.0)	−2.5 (27.5)	−5.0 (23.0)	−6.1 (21.0)	−7.3 (18.9)	−6.6 (20.1)	−4.2 (24.4)	−2.2 (28.0)	−1.1 (30.0)	1.5 (34.7)	−7.3 (18.9)
Average precipitation mm (inches)	54.2 (2.13)	44.5 (1.75)	56.4 (2.22)	55.2 (2.17)	67.6 (2.66)	82.8 (3.26)	81.0 (3.19)	82.5 (3.25)	71.0 (2.80)	75.3 (2.96)	60.8 (2.39)	55.8 (2.20)	790.4 (31.12)
Average precipitation days (≥ 0.2 mm)	5.4	4.7	5.5	6.6	8.6	11.1	12.1	12.1	10.2	9.0	7.0	6.3	98.6
Source: Australian Bureau of Meteorology; Adelong (Tumut St)

== Heritage listings ==
Tumut has a number of heritage-listed sites, including:

- Adelong Falls Gold Workings
- Cootamundra–Tumut railway: Tumut railway station
- 46 Russell Street: Montreal Community Theatre
- Tumut Plains Road: Junction Bridge, Tumut
- 82–84 Wynyard Street: Tumut Post Office

== Economy ==
Tumut is the centre of a softwood industry based on plantation Pinus radiata. CarterHoltHarvey Woodproducts (Central and Northern Regions) Pty Ltd operate a major sawmill on Adelong Road (the Snowy Mountains Highway) and a chipboard panel factory next door. 8 km further west on the Snowy Mountains Highway at Gilmore the company also operates a sawlog processing plant.

The Visy pulp and paper mill is located north of the Snowy Mountains Highway at Gadara (between Tumut and Adelong). The Visy mill is the only paper mill owned by Visy that makes paper from wood (their other mills all use recycled paper as the raw material), and is one of the biggest wood mills in Australia.

== Transport ==
Tumut is situated on the Snowy Mountains Highway, but is connected by secondary roads to Gundagai as well as alternative routes to Canberra across the Brindabella Range via Brindabella Road and Wee Jasper Road. Despite being more direct, the terrain and road conditions limit traffic via these routes. This has led to calls by the council and local businesses for funding to upgrade the Brindabella Road, as the increased traffic would provide the town greater economic opportunities.

The town was served by a railway branch line and railway station from Cootamundra, which operated from 1903 until 1984, when services were suspended due to flooding. Although the line is not formally closed, it is unlikely to see service again with sections of track lifted during upgrades to the Hume Highway near Gundagai.

NSW TrainLink coach services operate three times each week to Tumbarumba in the south, connecting with rail services to Melbourne and Sydney at Cootamundra three times each week.

Tumut Shire operates Tumut Airport, a small facility located a few kilometres out of town catering to general aviation. Currently there are no scheduled services to the airport.

== Sport ==
The Tumut Blues compete in the Group 9 Rugby League competition, winning premierships in 1949, 1973, 2003, 2007, 2008, 2010 and 2019.

The Tumut Football Club (Australian Rules Football) was established in 1970 and initially played in the Central Riverina Football League from 1970 to 1977, then joined the Upper Murray Football League in `1978 and played their until 1985. Tumut won the 1982 Upper Murray Football League senior football premiership and their club colours were brown and gold while competing in the Upper Murray Football League. Tumut then merged with Talbingo and played in the Farrer Football League from 1986 to 1987, before they folded.

Historical population
Year	Pop.	±%
1921	1,638	—
1933		—
1947		—
1954	3,012	—
1961	3,489	+15.8%
1966	4,278	+22.6%
1971	5,531	+29.3%
1976	5,569	+0.7%
1981	5,816	+4.4%
1986	6,099	+4.9%
1991	5,955	−2.4%
1996	5,915	−0.7%
2001	6,197	+4.8%
2006	5,925	−4.4%
2011	6,086	+2.7%
2016	6,154	+1.1%
2021	6,518	+5.9%
Source: Australian Bureau of Statistics data.

== Notable people ==
- Ray Beavan – rugby league player
- Allan Butler – paralympian
- Kim Carr (born 1955) – is an Australian politician, a Senator for Victoria and former Minister of several departments
- Reg Downing – Attorney General of New South Wales (1956–65)
- Cate Fowler AM – theatre producer, dramaturg
- David Johnson – former CEO of Campbell Soup Company
- Tom Kirk – rugby league player
- Tony McRae – Member and Minister in Western Australian Parliament (2001–08)
- Tony Quirk – rugby league player
- John Ryan – Victoria Cross recipient
- Sally Shipard – former international soccer player
- Rosie Waterland – author

== See also ==
- Tumut High School
