= Happy Jacks Creek =

Happy Jacks Happy Jacks River
- Location of the Happy Jacks Creek mouth in New South Wales

Location
- Country: Australia
- State: New South Wales
- Region: Australian Alps (IBRA), Snowy Mountains
- LGA: Snowy Valleys

Physical characteristics
- Source: Australian Alps, Great Dividing Range
  - location: near The Dip
  - coordinates: 36°0′28″S 148°33′11″E
  - elevation: 1,640 m (5,380 ft)
- Mouth: Tumut River
  - location: Happy Jacks Pondage
  - coordinates: 36°0′10″S 148°26′59″E
  - elevation: 1,210 m (3,970 ft)
- Length: 19 km (12 mi)

Basin features
- River system: Murrumbidgee catchment, Murray–Darling basin
- Tributaries
  - left: McKeahnies Creek, Tibeaudo Creek

The Happy Jacks Creek, a perennial river that is part of the Murrumbidgee catchment within the Murray–Darling basin, is located in the Snowy Mountains region of New South Wales, Australia.

== Course and features ==
The Happy Jacks Creek (technically a river) rises near The Dip within the Kosciuszko National Park, sourced by runoff from the Australian Alps, part of the Great Dividing Range. The creek flows generally south by southwest and then north by northwest, joined by two minor tributaries, before reaching its confluence with the Tumut River (itself a tributary of the Murrumbidgee River), in remote mountainous country at the Happy Jacks Pondage, formed by the Happy Jacks Dam. The creek descends 428 metres (1,404 ft) over its 19-kilometre (12 mi) course, that is contained entirely within the Kosciuszko National Park.

The catchment area is part of the territory traditionally occupied by the Aboriginal Walgalu people, who were joined in the summer months by the Ngarigo and Ngunawal for the bogong feasts.

== See also ==
- List of rivers of New South Wales (A–K)
- Rivers of New South Wales
- Snowy Mountains Scheme
