= Ray Beavan =

Australian rugby league footballer

Ray Beaven
Personal information
- Full name: Raymond John Beaven
- Born: 26 July 1936 Yass, New South Wales, Australia
- Died: 7 June 2018 (aged 81) Tumut, New South Wales, Australia

Playing information
- Position: Fullback
Club
Years	Team	Pld	T	G	FG	P
1958–60	Eastern Suburbs Roosters	19	8	0	0	24
1962	Canterbury-Bankstown	14	3	0	0	9
	Total	33	11	0	0	33
Representative
Years	Team	Pld	T	G	FG	P
1961–63	New South Wales	2	0	0	0	0

Ray Beaven (1936−2018) was an Australian professional rugby league footballer who played in the 1950s and 1960s. He played for the Eastern Suburbs, Canterbury Bulldogs and for the Australian national side.

Beaven began his rugby league career with Eastern Suburbs in Australia's leading competition, the New South Wales Rugby League (NSWRL) in 1958. Beaven, a five-eighth or centre, played 10 matches for the Roosters.

In 1960 Beaven moved to the rural NSW township of Tumut where he played for the local side. In 1961 Beaven was selected to represent NSW in 2 interstate matches against Queensland and later that year gained selection for the Australian national side for its tour of New Zealand.

He returned to the NSWRL in 1962, where he captained Canterbury-Bankstown to a Pre-Season Cup final.
