= Hillas Hut =

Hillas Hut and other buildings
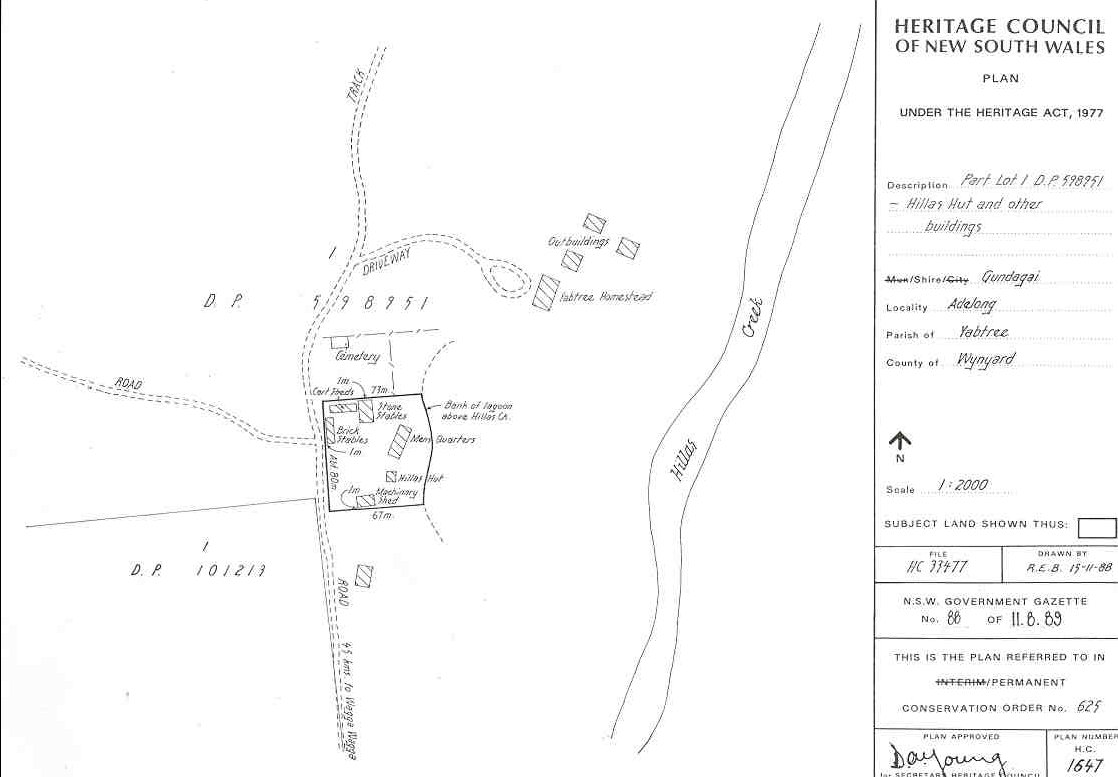
- Heritage boundaries

- Location within New South Wales Location within Australia
- 35.1010°S 147.7753°E
- Location: Hillas Creek, Adelong, Cootamundra-Gundagai Regional Council, New South Wales, Australia

Site notes
- Owner: Yabtree Pty. Ltd.

New South Wales Heritage Register
- Official name: Hillas Hut and other buildings
- Type: state heritage (built)
- Designated: 2 April 1999
- Reference no.: 625
- Type: historic site

Hillas Hut is a heritage-listed historic hut at Hillas Creek, Adelong, in the Riverina region of New South Wales, Australia. It was added to the New South Wales State Heritage Register on 2 April 1999.

== History ==
Hillas Hut is a timber slab hut on Yabtree Station dating from prior to 1835. It was built from local materials. James Hillas, the son of owner John Hillas, was murdered in the hut in 1835. It was used as a blacksmith's workshop after 1859. It forms part of the Yabtree Farm complex today.

== Heritage listing ==
Hillas Hut was listed on the New South Wales State Heritage Register on 2 April 1999.
