= Adelong, New South Wales =

Adelong
- Town
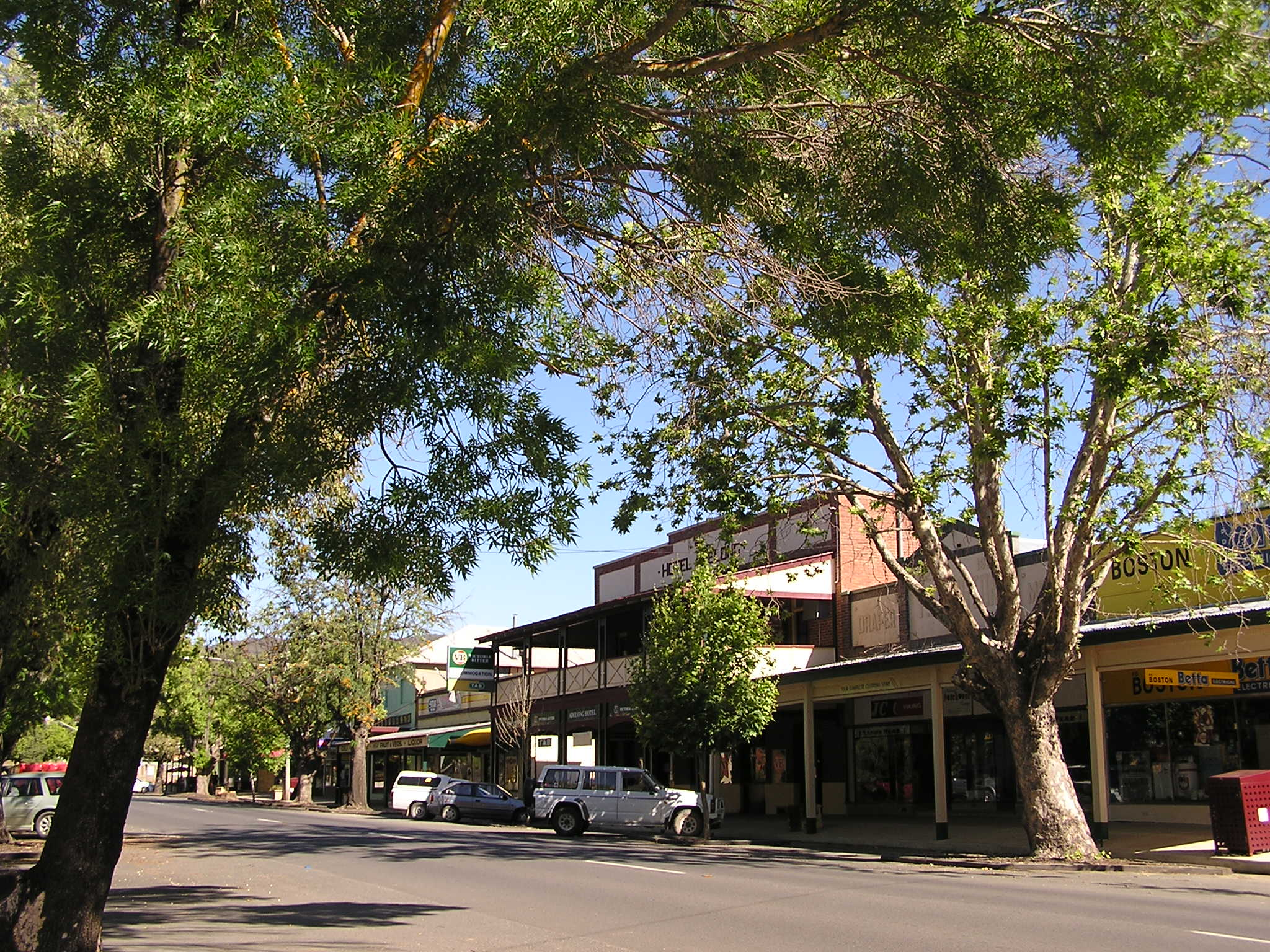
- Main street

- Coordinates: 35°18′S 148°03′E
- Country: Australia
- State: New South Wales
- LGA: Snowy Valleys Council
- Location: 410 km (250 mi) SW of Sydney; 81 km (50 mi) ESE of Wagga Wagga; 20 km (12 mi) W of Tumut; 6 km (3.7 mi) SSE of Grahamstown
- Established: 1836

Government
  - State electorate: Wagga Wagga
  - Federal division: Riverina
- Elevation: 303 m (994 ft)

Population
  - Total: 856 (UCL 2021)
- Postcode: 2729
- County: Wynyard
- Mean max temp: 21.8 °C (71.2 °F)
- Mean min temp: 6.7 °C (44.1 °F)
- Annual rainfall: 790.4 mm (31.12 in)

Adelong is a small town in the Riverina region of New South Wales, Australia, on the banks of the Adelong Creek. Adelong sits on the Snowy Mountains Highway and is a part of the Snowy Valleys Council. At the 2021 census, Adelong had an urban population of 856.

== Etymology ==
Adelong's name is said to be derived from the local Aboriginal language meaning "along the way" or "plain with a river".

== History ==
The area now known as Adelong lies on the traditional lands of the Wiradjuri people.

In 1852 during the Australian Gold Rush, gold was discovered at Upper Adelong. Records around the time indicated a yield of 198 kg of precious metals. In 1855 Adelong was declared a gold field. The Adelong township, which was first established in 1836, came alive when in 1857 William Willams discovered a gold bearing reef ore on Charcoal Hill. Alluvial mining and panning along the Adelong Creek was followed by mines being staked in the surrounding hills and water and steam powered stamper batteries were located along the creek to crush and process the hard pyritic quartz ore. These included the heritage-listed Adelong Falls Gold Workings. There were a number of deep quartz reef mines at Adelong, including the Great Victoria Mine.

The gold ran out in the first part of the 20th century and the pastoral industry became the principal activity. This was mainly Merino sheep and beef cattle, and continues now. Over the last 20 years a tourist industry has developed because of the pleasant scenery and gold mining history. During the gold rush many Chinese people worked in the mines, a lot of whom died and were buried in a special portion of the Adelong cemetery. One or two elderly Chinese and Indians still lived in Adelong in the 1950s. A community named Cornishtown existed about a mile to the west of Adelong until the 1940s.

Historical population
Year	Pop.	±%
1954	789	—
1961	800	+1.4%
1966	741	−7.4%
1971	759	+2.4%
1976	766	+0.9%
1981	806	+5.2%
1986	855	+6.1%
1991	795	−7.0%
1996	782	−1.6%
2001	800	+2.3%
2006	829	+3.6%
2011	884	+6.6%
2016	829	−6.2%
2021	856	+3.3%
Source: Australian Bureau of Statistics data.

== Climate ==
Adelong has a wetter climate than other low-lying areas on the South West Slopes due to its proximity to the Brindabella Range. Summers are warm to hot and dry, though often chilly by morning; winters cool and rainy, with occasional snow (the last significant snowfall being in August 2019). Cold rain below 5 °C (41 °F) falls with some regularity in the winter months. Seasonal range is great about the maximum temperatures, and in the warmer months, diurnal range is also great. On average there are 113.2 clear days annually; with the grand majority in summer and early autumn, while the winter tends to be cloudy. Under the Köppen climate classification scheme, the town is located in transitional areas between the humid subtropical (Cfa) and oceanic climates.

Rainfall records began in 1883 at Adelong (Tumut St), but temperature records not until 1907, and temperature extremes not until 1965. Temperature records ceased in 1994, but those of rainfall continued to 2020 before ceasing.

Climate data for Adelong (Tumut St, 1907–1994, rainfall 1883–2020); 333 m AMSL; 35.31° S, 148.06° E
Month	Jan	Feb	Mar	Apr	May	Jun	Jul	Aug	Sep	Oct	Nov	Dec	Year
Record high °C (°F)	42.6 (108.7)	42.8 (109.0)	41.1 (106.0)	31.1 (88.0)	26.1 (79.0)	23.3 (73.9)	23.0 (73.4)	25.7 (78.3)	31.7 (89.1)	33.3 (91.9)	39.0 (102.2)	40.3 (104.5)	42.8 (109.0)
Mean daily maximum °C (°F)	30.7 (87.3)	30.4 (86.7)	27.3 (81.1)	22.0 (71.6)	17.2 (63.0)	13.5 (56.3)	12.5 (54.5)	14.3 (57.7)	17.8 (64.0)	21.4 (70.5)	25.2 (77.4)	28.8 (83.8)	21.8 (71.2)
Mean daily minimum °C (°F)	12.9 (55.2)	13.4 (56.1)	10.5 (50.9)	6.3 (43.3)	3.7 (38.7)	1.6 (34.9)	0.9 (33.6)	2.0 (35.6)	3.7 (38.7)	5.9 (42.6)	8.5 (47.3)	11.0 (51.8)	6.7 (44.1)
Record low °C (°F)	2.5 (36.5)	3.0 (37.4)	−1.1 (30.0)	−2.5 (27.5)	−5.0 (23.0)	−6.1 (21.0)	−7.3 (18.9)	−6.6 (20.1)	−4.2 (24.4)	−2.2 (28.0)	−1.1 (30.0)	1.5 (34.7)	−7.3 (18.9)
Average precipitation mm (inches)	54.2 (2.13)	44.5 (1.75)	56.4 (2.22)	55.2 (2.17)	67.6 (2.66)	82.8 (3.26)	81.0 (3.19)	82.5 (3.25)	71.0 (2.80)	75.3 (2.96)	60.8 (2.39)	55.8 (2.20)	790.4 (31.12)
Average precipitation days (≥ 0.2 mm)	5.4	4.7	5.5	6.6	8.6	11.1	12.1	12.1	10.2	9.0	7.0	6.3	98.6
Source: Australian Bureau of Meteorology; Adelong (Tumut St)

== Heritage listings ==
Adelong has a number of heritage-listed sites, including:

- Adelong Falls Gold Workings
- Hillas Creek: Hillas Hut

== Education ==
There are currently two primary schools, Adelong Public School and St. Joseph's Primary School, servicing the town and surrounding areas.
