= Round Mountain (Snowy Mountains) =

Mountain in New South Wales, Australia

- Location within New South Wales

Highest point
- Elevation: 1,756 m (5,761 ft)
- Coordinates: 36°2′S 148°21′E

Geography
- Location: Snowy Mountains, New South Wales, Australia
- Parent range: Main Range, Snowy Mountains, Great Dividing Range

The Round Mountain, one of three peaks of the same name in the region, is a mountain located on the Main Range of the Snowy Mountains, part of the Great Dividing Range, in southeastern New South Wales, Australia.

With an elevation of 1,756 metres (5,761 ft) above sea level, Round Mountain is situated on a high point on the watershed between the Tumut River and Tooma River catchments. The summit is located close to the Khancoban-Cabramurra Road. A major fire trail running from the main road, makes Round Mountain a popular starting location for hiking and cross-country skiing expeditions.

Similar to other peaks in the area, it is covered by scrub on its lower slopes and in the more elevated areas it is clear and grassy.

The other Round Mountain peaks are located at 36°32′S 148°25′E and 36°14′S 148°34′E.

== See also ==
- List of mountains of Australia § New South Wales
