= Adelong Creek =

River in New South Wales, Australia

Adelong
- Location of the Adelong Creek mouth in New South Wales

Location
- Country: Australia
- State: New South Wales
- Region: South West Slopes
- IBRAs: Riverina; South Eastern Highlands
- LGAs: Snowy Valleys; Cootamundra-Gundagai

Physical characteristics
- Source: Australian Alps, Great Dividing Range
  - location: southwest of Batlow
  - coordinates: 35°32′3″S 148°4′40″E
  - elevation: 451 m (1,480 ft)
- Mouth: Murrumbidgee River
  - location: near Gundagai
  - coordinates: 35°6′13″S 148°2′9″E
  - elevation: 212 m (696 ft)
- Length: 46 km (29 mi)

Basin features
- River system: Murrumbidgee catchment, Murray–Darling basin
- Tributaries
  - right: Califat Creek
- Waterfall: Adelong Falls

The Adelong Creek, a perennial river that is part of the Murrumbidgee catchment within the Murray–Darling basin, is located in the South West Slopes, and Riverina regions of New South Wales, Australia.

== Course and features ==
The Adelong Creek (technically a river) rises below Wondalga, southwest of Batlow sourced by runoff from the Australian Alps, part of the Great Dividing Range. The creek flows generally north through the towns of Adelong and Tumblong, joined by one minor tributary, before reaching its confluence with the Murrumbidgee River southwest of Gundagai. The creek descends 239 metres (784 ft) over its 46-kilometre (29 mi) course.

The river is crossed by the Snowy Mountains Highway at Adelong; and the Hume Highway at Tumblong.

== Mining ==
Adelong Creek, near Adelong Falls, was the source of water for two waterwheels that powered stamper batteries, at what is now the site known as the Adelong Falls Gold Workings. The bed of Adelong Creek was extensively mined using hydraulic sluicing and gold dredges, during the first half of the 20th century.

== See also ==
- List of rivers of New South Wales (A-K)
- Rivers of New South Wales
