= Peak River =

Peak Atkinsons Creek, Baloo Arm
- Location of the Peak River mouth in New South Wales

Location
- Country: Australia
- State: New South Wales
- Region: Australian Alps (IBRA), Snowy Mountains
- LGA: Snowy Valleys Council

Physical characteristics
- Source: Bogong Range, Snowy Mountains
  - location: near Bogong Mountain
  - elevation: 1,140 m (3,740 ft)
- Mouth: confluence with the Goobarragandra River
  - location: near Macks Crossing
  - coordinates: 35°24′56″S 148°26′08″E
  - elevation: 423 m (1,388 ft)
- Length: 21 km (13 mi)

Basin features
- River system: Murrumbidgee catchment, Murray–Darling basin
- National park: Kosciuszko NP

The Peak River, a perennial stream that is part of the Murrumbidgee catchment within the Murray–Darling basin, is located in the Snowy Mountains region of New South Wales, Australia.

== Course and features ==
The Peak River rises below Bogong Peaks, on the northeastern slopes of Mount Bogong within the Bongong Range, part of the Snowy Mountains, contained within the Kosciuszko National Park. The river flows generally north before reaching its confluence with the Goobarragandra River near Macks Crossing. The river descends 720 metres (2,360 ft) over its 21-kilometre (13 mi) course.

== See also ==
- List of rivers of New South Wales (L–Z)
- List of rivers of Australia
- Rivers of New South Wales
