= Tumut Post Office =

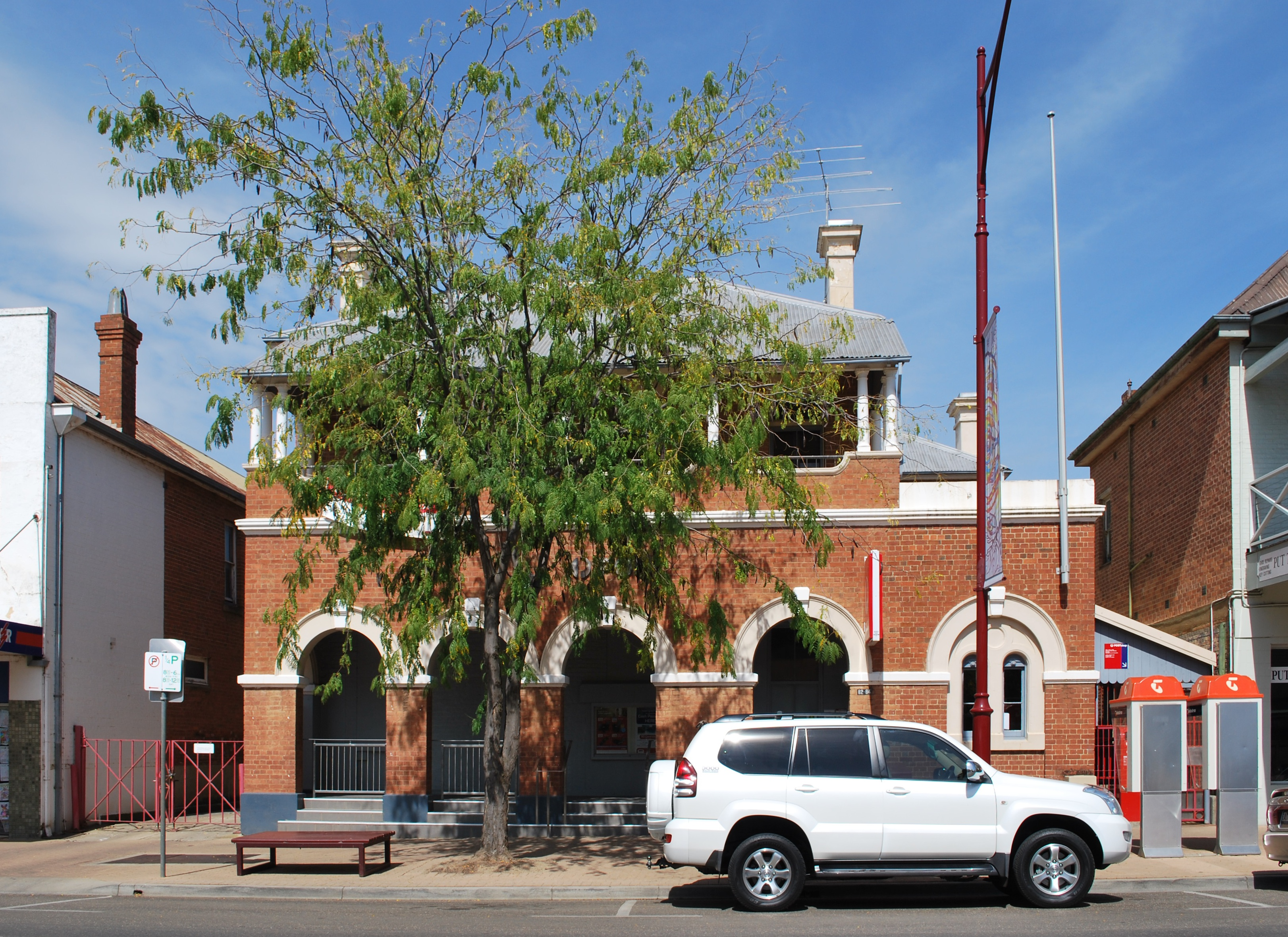

- Location within New South Wales
- 35.3016°S 148.2236°E
- Location: 82–84 Wynyard Street, Tumut, New South Wales, Australia

Commonwealth Heritage List
- Official name: Tumut Post Office
- Type: Listed place (Historic)
- Designated: 22 August 2012
- Reference no.: 106198

Tumut Post Office is a heritage-listed post office at 82–84 Wynyard Street, Tumut, New South Wales, Australia. It was added to the Australian Commonwealth Heritage List on 22 August 2012.

== History ==
The valley in which Tumut is located was explored by Hamilton Hume and William Hovell in 1824, with settlers arriving later that decade. By 1852 a town existed, but the discovery of gold at Kiandra in 1859, about 80 kilometres south-east of Tumut, provided a market for Tumut's primary products, and the town began to grow. A town council was created in 1887 and a railway connection to Gundagai was opened in 1903. The area's economy was based on agriculture and later on forestry and timber. In the post-WWII period, the Snowy Mountains Hydro-Electric Scheme also brought increased prosperity and development into Tumut.

Tumut Post Office, incorporating residential quarters at first floor level, was built in 1879 by Eberlin and Hoad, to designs by the Colonial Architect, James Barnet, at a cost of £2,300. The new building replaced the previous post and telegraph office which had been operating from rented premises. The post office was designed in conjunction with the court house and police station nearby, and is reputed to have used the same builder.

Later works included alterations in 1888, and a more major upgrade in c.1904 including an internal renovation and a reworking of the front of the building.

== Description ==
Tumut Post Office is at 82–84 Wynyard Street, Tumut, comprising the whole of Lots 1 and 2 DP33472.

Tumut Post Office is on a 'wayside' site in Wynyard Street, facing north-west and next door to the Royal Hotel. It comprises an 1879 core, basically rectangular in form with the post office public area on the ground floor and the quarters above. It was nearly entirely enclosed within new fabric in 1904, in the Federation period. Externally, this included the removal of a wood shingled roof that was evidently in the 1879 design and its replacement with an asymmetrical timber roof clad in corrugated galvanised iron, and the addition of a balcony and an arcaded loggia to Wynyard Street.

The Wynyard Street frontage is marked at ground level by a five-bayed arcade, enclosing a loggia behind four of its arches and having the fifth, on the frontage's right, filled in by a double stilted arched window and face brick tympanum. The arches are in dressed stucco, and the piers and spandrels are all in face brick. The loggia is terminated compositionally by a moulded string course, with a face brick parapet under the first floor balcony. The balcony only covers four of the arches, and is supplanted by a stuccoed parapet above the infilled window arch. Examination of the fabric indicates that the bricks for the stylobate entrance are a different colour to those of the loggia. Historic photographs indicate that originally there was a loggia of four arches, the fourth arch was infilled by the window form, and subsequently an additional bay was constructed and the window form was repositioned in this archway opening, after the upper level balcony was constructed.

The balcony roof is integrated into the main roof, has exposed rafters and is supported on a set of thirteen turned columns. These are paired at each end and backed by an additional six at both ends of the balcony. The columns have pedestals formed as part of the brick parapet, with concave turns upward on either side of each column or pair, creating a scalloped effect. A brass handrail is fitted between the pedestals. The columns are not centrally located above the brick piers below. The roof above is a jerkin-headed design, slightly off centre by an eave projection on the left (northeast) end. At each end, the balcony roof is closed with a weatherboard half-gable. The balcony ceiling is of painted timber boards.

Internally the ground floor loggia has overpainted brick walls, and the positioning of now bricked up former doorways and windows is evident. The floor and steps are tiled, and handrails added in the 1990s.

There is an alleyway to the west of the building, which provides access to the postal boxes at the rear, inset into a modern extension of red brick with clerestory windows. A bagged brick firewall has been built on the boundary, and the yard is brick paved. The post box 'alley' has a steel framed verandah, and a clear polycarbonate roof.

The original kitchen walls are of brick, and there is a bricked up window opening, as well as a new window. Two large, double hung windows illuminate the retail area. Access to the retail area is still from the loggia and by a set of timber doors. An access ramp has been built into the loggia, directly up the stylobate from Wynyard Street. Above the ramp there is a skillion roof, on which the air conditioning plant is located. A concrete access ramp has been added to the side of the building in the alley. It has a pebblecrete surface and steel handrails. The concrete driveway at the other end of the building leads to a large concreted yard at the rear, providing access to the mail delivery room. The original building elevation to the driveway is of unpainted brick. There are three blocked in side doors in this elevation which are rendered and painted, and there are tuck pointed segmented brick arched to the doorways. The rear of the building is dominated by the modern addition, which is constructed of red brick with corbelled details, zincalume corrugated roofing, powder-coated white aluminium framed windows and a steel canopy to protect delivery trucks.

Internally, the postal hall been reconfigured to conform to the 1980-1990s Australia Post format, and is screened from the rear offices by a partition. Some original features are still visible, such as the ceiling and tops of windows. The rear offices, mail room and loading area are open plan in form, and the former quarters are now utilised as store rooms, the lunch area, toilets and locker rooms. The cedar staircase is original. There are many original four-panel doors, with ogee inlaid mouldings and architraves.

The former porch to the side door has been converted into a postal box filling area. The brick walls have been overpainted, and the raked ceiling is of plasterboard with a scotia cornice. The small sorting room (former kitchen) has plastered walls, with staff moulds on the chimney breast. The upgrade to this space involved the installation a new plasterboard ceiling, scotia cornice and carpet over the timber floor.

The large delivery and sorting room replaced the original battery room, and the domestic facilities for the on-site manager and family. The interior finishes are of plasterboard, with a raked ceiling, and clerestory windows. The former external wall has been sheeted over, but the original windows, which formerly opened to the outside are in-situ. There is also a disabled persons' toilet, and a cleaners' room.

The former passage from the original rear external door is now used as a parcels store. The back office has original plaster walls, a fire surround, staff moulds, cornice and wall vents. The ceiling may not be the original ceiling and the fireplace has been sealed. The store room has a plasterboard ceiling and modern carpet laid over timber. The original plaster walls and double-hung window are in-situ, the last with its ogee architrave. The Post Master's office is divided from the retail space by a modern plasterboard partition. Original details which have been retained include the double hung window.

To the first floor, the original rooms retain plaster walls, skirtings, cornices, fire surrounds, walls vents and window and French doors, albeit with some partitions. The landing and stairwell retain an original double-hung window (without glazing bars) the original skirtings and cornice, and the cedar balustrade to the staircase. The ceiling has been replaced with sheet material.

The toilets are modern and have been formed from a former box room and linen press. The locker room (maid's room) retains its original double-hung window with six-pane sashes and ogee architrave. The cornice is square set and the floor is vinyl on timber.

=== Key areas/elements ===
- Arcaded verandah, first floor balcony and imposing two-storey presentation to the street
- Surviving original fabric and detailing including doors and windows, joinery, skirtings and architraves, staircase

=== Condition ===
Generally, the property is in good condition given age and changes in programme.

=== Original fabric ===
- Structural frame: concrete footings; brick external walls, brick and timber-framed internal walls, timber framed roof mixed timber and concrete floor structures.
- External walls: sandstock face brick with some tuck pointed openings, plaster dressing on arches, window-heads and string courses.
- Internal walls: mixture of brick with plaster coating; and timber stud frame with plasterboard cladding.
- Floor: mixture of timber and concrete construction; carpeted in the retail and rear office areas, and with vinyl tiles in the lunch room and mail sorting areas. Ceramic tile flooring in the wet areas. Brick flooring in the loggia.
- Ceiling: set plaster, with suspended light fittings.
- Roof: timber framed; clad in corrugated galvanised iron.

=== Summary of development and/or alteration ===
According to the Property Valuation Report, 2005, the history of the building's development and alteration includes:

- 1888 (alterations)
- 1896 (repairs)
- c. 1904 (internal renovation, roof replaced, balcony added)
- 1990s retailing upgrade of general office
- 1995 major rear addition and internal refurbishment.

The post office was substantially altered and extended in 1904, and the shingle roof was replaced with corrugated iron. The first floor balcony was added at this time. An addition to the rear was built in 1995 to a design by Nigel Mereweather. It forms a side alley with access to post boxes and a ramp to the main chamber and comprises a mail sorting room, disabled toilet, cleaners room, and also provides access to fill the postal boxes. The new building replaced some original ancillary rooms, including a battery room, scullery, pantry and bathroom. At the same time, the upstairs toilets were upgraded, the building carpeted, and painted throughout in a grey scheme. Upstairs partitions in one of the former bedrooms may have been built at this time. Similarly, the rear truck canopy is part of the 1995 phase.

== Heritage listing ==
Tumut Post Office, originally built in 1879 to a design of Colonial Architect, James Barnet, is of historical and social significance. The building has been associated with the provision of postal services in the town for over 130 years, and was constructed in a similar period to the nearby court house and police station. In this way it has been part of the consolidation of public buildings in Tumut. Although later modified with a new frontage to Wynyard Street, the historic building remains prominent and recognisably one of the collection of important local public and commercial buildings in the town centre, including those in the Tumut Urban Conservation Area, an attribute which enhances these aspects of significance (criterion a and g).

In typological terms, the post office retains an 1879 core as well as the original residential quarters at first floor level. Other original or early internal spaces and planning can also be discerned, albeit with more recent and mostly standard Australia Post fit outs. More generally, the Federation addition of a balcony and an arcaded loggia to Wynyard Street also changed aspects of the original layout. Stylistically and architecturally, Tumut is a fusion of Victorian design from the Barnet period and Federation design from the Vernon-Oakeshott phase of New South Wales Government architecture. While the later works added some character and aesthetic value, the fusion of periods has detracted from a clear emergent style. Nevertheless, the building has a forceful presentation to the street, with significant elements including the imposing two-storey presentation, prominent chimneys, arcaded verandah and scalloped balcony detailing. The internal staircase and fenestration are additionally of a high standard of craftsmanship (criterion d).

Aesthetically, Tumut Post Office also contributes to the historic character of the immediate streetscape of this part of the Tumut Urban Conservation Area. This is emphasised by the imposing two-storey presentation, and the handsome and well detailed arcaded verandah and first floor balcony. The building is also an important component of the collection of local historic public and commercial buildings (criterion e).

The curtilage includes the title block/allotment of the property.

The significant components of Tumut Post Office include the 1879 double-storey main component of the building, and the external envelope of 1904. The modern red brick extension to the rear with awning, and the steel framed verandah with polycarbonate roof and ramp to the post box 'alley' are not significant.

Tumut Post Office was listed on the Australian Commonwealth Heritage List on 22 August 2012 having satisfied the following criteria.

Criterion A: Processes

Tumut Post Office, originally built in 1879 to a design of Colonial Architect, James Barnet, has been associated with the provision of postal services in the town for over 130 years. The building was also constructed in a similar period to the nearby court house and police station, and in this way has been part of the consolidation of public buildings in Tumut. Although later modified with a new frontage to Wynyard Street, the historic building remains prominent and recognisably one of the important local public buildings, an attribute which enhances this aspect of significance.

Criterion D: Characteristic values

Tumut Post Office is an example of:

1. Post office and telegraph office with quarters (second generation typology 1870–1929)

2. Victorian Italianate style with Federation Free style additions

3. Architect: New South Wales Colonial Architect under James Barnet, with alterations by Walter Vernon and George Oakeshott

Tumut Post Office, built in 1879 and extended and altered, retains an 1879 core as well as the original residential quarters at first floor level. Other original or early internal spaces and planning can also be discerned, albeit with more recent and mostly standard Australia Post fitouts. The Federation works included addition of a balcony and an arcaded loggia to Wynyard Street, which also changed aspects of the original layout.

Stylistically and architecturally, Tumut is a fusion of Victorian design from the Barnet period and Federation design from the Vernon-Oakeshott phase of New South Wales Government architecture. While the later works added some character and aesthetic value, the fusion of periods has detracted from a clear emergent style. Nevertheless, the building has a forceful presentation to the street, with significant elements including the imposing two-storey presentation, prominent chimneys, arcaded verandah and scalloped balcony detailing. The internal staircase and fenestration are additionally of a high standard of craftsmanship.

Criterion E: Aesthetic characteristics

Tumut Post Office, while a fusion of architectural styles from two distinct periods, nevertheless contributes to the historic character of the immediate streetscape of this part of the Tumut Urban Conservation Area, where there are a number of valued buildings from the nineteenth century. The contribution is enhanced by the imposing two-storey presentation, and the handsome and well detailed arcaded verandah and first floor balcony.

Criterion G: Social value

Tumut Post Office has been the focus of local postal communication services for over 130 years. Its social value is enhanced by its prominent location, and its role in, and contribution to the valued collection of other historic public and commercial buildings in the centre of Tumut, where the Tumut Urban Conservation Area is located.
