= Junction Bridge, Tumut =

Junction Bridge
- Coordinates: 35°18′58″S 148°15′49″E
- Carries: Tumut Plains Road
- Crosses: Tumut River
- Locale: Tumut, New South Wales, Australia
- Begins: Tumut
- Ends: Tumut Plains
- Other name(s): Shelley Bridge
- Owner: Transport for NSW

Characteristics
- Design: McDonald truss bridge
- Material: Timber
- Width: 4.57 metres (15.0 ft)
- No. of lanes: 1

History
- Construction start: 1893
- Construction end: June 1895

New South Wales Heritage Register
- Official name: Junction Bridge
- Type: State heritage (built)
- Designated: 20 June 2000
- Reference no.: 1471
- Type: Road Bridge
- Category: Transport – Land

The Junction Bridge is a heritage-listed road bridge that carries the Tumut Plains Road across the Tumut River, from Tumut to Tumut Plains in New South Wales, Australia. The bridge is owned by Transport for NSW. It was added to the New South Wales State Heritage Register on 20 June 2000.

== History ==
Annual Public Works reports suggest that work on the bridge commenced in 1893, and was completed by June 1895. According to the plans for the bridge, this structure replaced an older bridge which had been located immediately south (upstream) of the new bridge.

The bridge was named the Shelley Bridge after the wife of Mr. George Shelley, one of the first settlers of Tumut, arriving in 1832. the name Shelley Bridge appears to have dropped out of use until the late 1950s when E. H. Shelley, a grandson of Mrs. Shelley, requested that: 'The name of our late grandmother should be honoured by having the bridge officially recorded as the Shelley Bridge, in accordance with the wishes of the relatives as indicated at the opening.

At the time of this request there appears to have been no record of the bridge being named Shelley, but it was listed by the Public Works Department as the Junction Bridge over the Tumut River at Shelley's. However, Mr Shelley's request was complied with and action was taken to have signs erected at the bridge, naming it as Shelley's Bridge.

Roads and Traffic Authority (RTA) maintenance records for the Junction Bridge commenced in 1932, although notes from that year mention previous maintenance works carried out by the NSW Department of Public Works.

== Description ==
The Bridge consists of four timber girder approach spans and three McDonald truss spans. The bridge has a road width of 4.57 metres (15.0 ft) between kerbs, accommodating a single lane of traffic.

The original bridge plans show four timber girder spans on the Tumut side and no approach span on the other. However, it is nowhere stated in the records whether the Tumut end was built with three spans or whether one span was later removed. The approach span on the Punt Bridge (or eastern) side was added around 1975 due to scour of the river bank which is on the outside of a bend in the river.

== Heritage listing ==
As at 13 September 2005, Junction Bridge is one of five McDonald trusses remaining in NSW to date (one of which is no longer used by road traffic), and of these, it is ranked second in terms of its heritage significance. The bridge is readily accessible from Sydney and the nearby alpine areas and is situated in an idyllic rural setting over the Tumut River. The bridge is the only existing triple span arrangement of the McDonals truss, a seminal bridge type designed by a prominent local engineer who was part of an important influential group of NSW Public Works Department Engineers, including Percy Allan, Harvey Dare, Ernest de Burgh and John Bradfield. Junction Bridge was designed to make full use of Australian native hardwoods as structural members and forms part of a group of bridge types that combine to illustrate the evolution of timber truss bridge design in Australia. Collectively, these revolutionized the ability of the government to provide trafficable roads around NSW in the late nineteenth century. While the Bridge as a whole has been assessed as fulfilling the criteria for listing on the SHR, the various elements that comprise the bridge are of varying levels of significance: abutments, approach spans and barrier railing are of moderate significance, the deck is of high significance, and the truss spans and cross girders are of exceptional significance.

The Junction Bridge was listed on the New South Wales State Heritage Register on 20 June 2000.

== See also ==
- List of bridges in Australia
