= Happy Jacks Dam =

- Location of the Happy Jacks Dam in New South Wales
- Country: Australia
- Location: Snowy Mountains, New South Wales
- Coordinates: 36°01′S 148°26′E
- Status: Operational
- Opening date: 1959
- Owner: Snowy Hydro

Dam and spillways
- Type of dam: Gravity dam
- Impounds: Tumut River
- Height: 29 metres (95 ft)
- Length: 76 metres (249 ft)
- Dam volume: 8,950 cubic metres (316,000 cu ft)
- Spillways: 1
- Spillway type: Uncontrolled
- Spillway capacity: 1,827 cubic metres per second (64,500 cu ft/s)

Reservoir
- Creates: Happy Jacks Pondage
- Total capacity: 271 megalitres (9.6×10^{6} cu ft)
- Surface area: 5 hectares (12 acres)
- Normal elevation: 1,192 metres (3,911 ft)

Happy Jacks Dam is a major ungated concrete gravity dam across the Tumut River in the Snowy Mountains region of New South Wales, Australia. The dam's main purpose is for the generation of hydro-power and is one of the sixteen major dams that comprise the Snowy Mountains Scheme, a vast hydroelectricity and irrigation complex constructed in south-east Australia between 1949 and 1974 and now run by Snowy Hydro.

The impounded reservoir is called the Happy Jacks Pondage. The dam wall is immediately downstream of the confluence of Happy Jacks Creek and the Tumut River.

== Location and features ==
Completed in 1959, Happy Jacks Dam is a major dam, located within the Snowy Valleys local government area. The dam was constructed by a consortium comprising Kaiser-Walsh-Perini-Raymond based on engineering plans developed by the United States Bureau of Reclamation under contract from the Snowy Mountains Hydroelectric Authority.

The dam wall comprising 8,950 cubic metres (316,000 cu ft) of concrete is 29 metres (95 ft) high and 76 metres (249 ft) long. At 100% capacity the dam wall holds back 271 megalitres (9.6×10^{6} cu ft) of water. The surface area of Happy Jacks Pondage is 5 hectares (12 acres). The uncontrolled spillway is capable of discharging 1,827 cubic metres per second (64,500 cu ft/s).

== See also ==
- Kosciuszko National Park
- List of dams and reservoirs in New South Wales
- Snowy Hydro Limited
- Snowy Mountains Scheme
- Snowy Scheme Museum
