= Kunama, New South Wales =

Kunama New South Wales
- Coordinates: 35°32′53.52″S 148°05′00.33″E
- Population: 1,313 (2016 census)
- Established: 1850s
- Postcode(s): 2730
- Elevation: 900–1,000 m (2,953–3,281 ft)
- Location: 442 km (275 mi) from Sydney; 226 km (140 mi) from Canberra; 116 km (72 mi) from Wagga Wagga
- LGA(s): Snowy Valleys Council
- County: Wynyard
- State electorate(s): Wagga Wagga
- Federal division(s): Riverina
Mean max temp	Mean min temp	Annual rainfall
15.6 °C; 60 °F	5.4 °C; 42 °F	1,577.4 mm 62.1 in

Kunama is a rural locality in the South West Slopes of New South Wales, situated 9 km (5.6 mi) west of Batlow at an elevation of 900 to 1,000 m (3,000 to 3,300 ft). The region is largely one of apple produce, beef cattle farming, and sustainable forestry consisting mainly of radiata pine plantations.

== History ==
The area was established in the 1850s. The Kunama branch railway, also known as Batlow line, was completed in 1923 as an extension to the Tumut line, branching off at a junction close to Gilmore and was formally closed, in 1957.

== Climate ==
Sitting at around 1,000 metres (3,300 ft) on the windward side of the ranges, Kunama experiences particularly cold and snowy winters, with a very high rainfall averaging nearly 1,600 millimetres (63 in).

Climate data for Kunama (971 m AMSL; 35.55° S, 148.10° E)
Month	Jan	Feb	Mar	Apr	May	Jun	Jul	Aug	Sep	Oct	Nov	Dec	Year
Mean daily maximum °C (°F)	24.7 (76.5)	24.0 (75.2)	21.5 (70.7)	15.7 (60.3)	11.2 (52.2)	7.9 (46.2)	7.2 (45.0)	8.4 (47.1)	12.5 (54.5)	14.4 (57.9)	17.7 (63.9)	22.2 (72.0)	15.6 (60.1)
Mean daily minimum °C (°F)	10.6 (51.1)	11.3 (52.3)	9.6 (49.3)	5.8 (42.4)	3.3 (37.9)	1.3 (34.3)	0.3 (32.5)	0.5 (32.9)	2.6 (36.7)	4.6 (40.3)	6.1 (43.0)	9.2 (48.6)	5.4 (41.8)
Average precipitation mm (inches)	66.9 (2.63)	67.5 (2.66)	116.6 (4.59)	118.2 (4.65)	169.1 (6.66)	173.2 (6.82)	173.8 (6.84)	148.9 (5.86)	125.9 (4.96)	205.8 (8.10)	138.4 (5.45)	73.1 (2.88)	1,577.4 (62.10)
Average precipitation days (≥ 0.2 mm)	6.0	6.5	7.6	11.8	13.1	15.5	14.2	17.3	10.4	16.8	11.5	8.4	139.1
Source: Australian Bureau of Meteorology; Kunama
