= Adelong Falls Gold Workings =

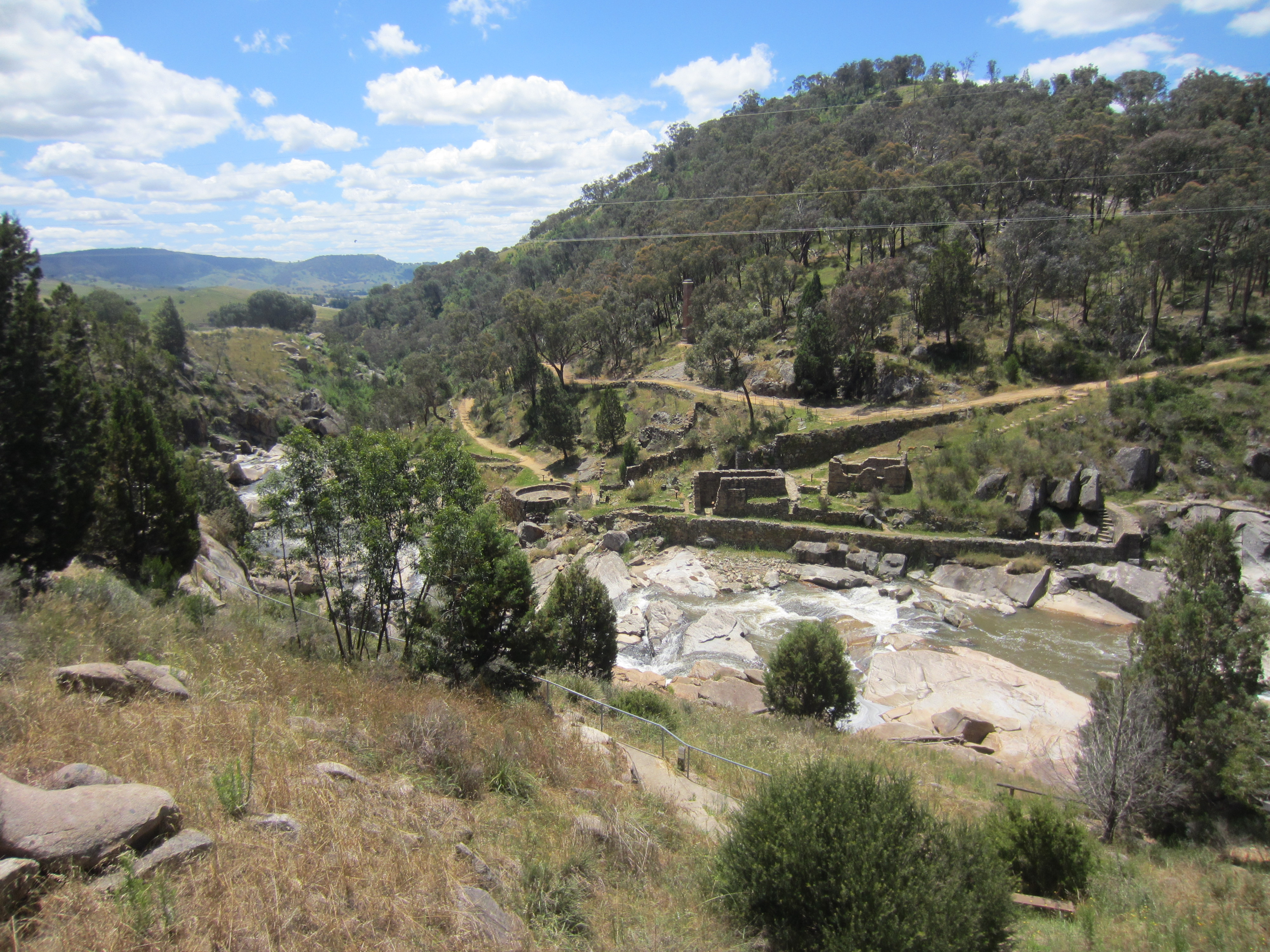

- Location within New South Wales Location within Australia
- 35°17′31″S 148°03′27″E
- Location: Adelong, Snowy Valleys Council, New South Wales, Australia

History
- Built: 1860

Site notes
- Architects: David Wilson; William Ritchie
- Owner: Snowy Valleys Council

New South Wales Heritage Register
- Official name: Adelong Falls Gold Workings/Reserve
- Type: State heritage (archaeological-terrestrial)
- Designated: 2 April 1999
- Reference no.: 72
- Type: Mineral Discovery site
- Category: Mining and Mineral Processing
- Builders: David Wilson and William Ritchie

The Adelong Falls Gold Workings is a heritage-listed former gold processing site and now picnic reserve at Adelong, in the Riverina region of New South Wales, Australia. It was designed and built in 1860 by David Wilson and William Ritchie. It is also known as Adelong Falls Gold Workings/Reserve. The property is owned by the Snowy Valleys Council. It was added to the New South Wales State Heritage Register on 2 April 1999.

== History ==
The Adelong Falls Reserve is within the Adelong Creek goldfield, which was proclaimed on 15 February 1855. The existing reservation for Public Recreation was notified on 26 November 1971. Most of the reserve south of Adelong Creek has always been Crown land, with the remainder in private ownership until 1980, when it became part of the reserve. The portion of the current reserve that lies north of the Creek was originally granted to or squired by David Wilson and William Ritchie between 1860 and 1885. Here they set up the Wilson and Ritchie Battery, one of the two principal ore processing plants on the Adelong field. The ruins and curtilage of the Battery were added to the reserve in 1980.

Reef mining was well underway on the Adelong goldfields by 1859. It was at this time that William Ritchie and Scottish born David Wilson established a "Reefer Battery" at Adelong. In the late 1860s they moved the battery to its present location at Adelong Falls. The Battery and associated processing works were designed to extract gold from its bearing ore by hydraulic separation and mercury attraction. The ore was crushed in a stamper battery until it was fine enough to be washed over mercury treated plates which attracted the gold particles. Tailings from this process were then treated in a Chilean Mill and sluiced. These tailings were then ground and passed into a buddle, designed to further separate the heavy metal by agitation. A furnace was also present on the site to allow gold and mercury from the first sluicing to be separated. This multi-tiered extraction process was designed to ensure maximum return.

The location of the battery made clever use of the topography. Its position within the cascade zone of Adelong Creek provided an immediate head of water. The slope of the bank where the works stood enabled ore to pass through by gravity feed, reducing the need for mechanical feeders. It also allowed a strong furnace draft via a smoke flue laid up the hillside like a covered drain. The major road linking Adelong to the reefs, crossed Adelong Creek at the head of the cascades, ensuring a constant stream of traffic past the battery.

The battery opened on 17 July 1870. The thorough processing techniques and fortuitous position ensured it was an immediate success. In 1881, operations were expanded when the partners bought an existing battery at the head of Sawyer's Creek. They built a dam at the original 1858 battery site and dug a race to a water wheel at the newly acquired battery. This was a substantial undertaking involving an aqueduct over Sawyer's Creek and a long flume across the hill. At various times there were experiments with silver traps and cyanide processing but the basic design was so good that it always prevailed. The works ran from 1870 to 1910 and remain as one of the most successful operations on the Australian goldfields during the last part of the nineteenth century.

Since 1980 the works have been accessible to the public as part of the Adelong Falls Reserve. In the early 1990s significant conservation works were undertaken on the extant remains, including the stabilisation of standing walls and the clearing of vegetation to attempt to regain the integrity of the original relationship of the site with the surrounding landscape. A number of mining companies have commenced operations in the area since 1986. Since May 1991 the Republic Mineral Corporation has continued to explore the gold lode in the Adelong Falls area immediately surrounding the Adelong Falls Reserve.

== Description ==
The 28-hectare (69-acre) Adelong Falls Reserve comprises steep rocky slopes, openly timbered and falling sharply to Adelong Creek and Sawyer's Creek. A distinctive feature is the presence of a large number of Xanthorrhoea, especially in the southern corner.

The Falls themselves are situated on Adelong Creek, 1 kilometre (0.62 mi) north of Adelong. At this point, the creek passes through a narrow gorge about 300 metres (980 ft) long and drops about 30 metres (98 ft) in height over that distance. It is here that the remains of the Wilson and Ritchie Battery are located, about 200 metres (660 ft) along the cascades. Archaeological investigations in 1985, showed that the Battery ruins are part of a larger, dynamically accrued complex of remains that extend past the boundary of the Adelong Falls Reserve.

The battery site comprises: two water wheels with associated weirs, races and aqueducts; a 24-foot buddle; a series of holding tanks; a small quarry; a reverbatory furnace with separate brick stack; a weighbridge; a works office; a cottage with a terraced garden; a metalled entry road with stone revetments; three paths and an unidentified terrace.

Immediately downstream of the curtilage are the weir, sluice and race that powered Gibraltar's works. An unknown battery stood on the upstream margin of the curtilage at the mouth of Sawyer's Creek. Both banks of that creek have been mined for its entire length. Approximately 500 metres (1,600 ft) upstream of the curtilage are the stone abutments and iron pegs of a large dam. The spillway and sluice stand on the right bank, connected by a race to the water wheels of the Battery. The owner's house stood atop the ridge on the left bank opposite Sawyer's Creek, overlooking the site.

The materials and techniques used in constructing the site (including the dam and owner's house outside the curtilage) are essentially uniform. Rough hewn granite, quarried on site, was used for all walls with the exception of the brick stack that terminates the furnace flue. Both concrete and lime mortar have been used. Timber was used sparingly, mainly for races, flooring and mountings. Roof cladding was corrugated iron.

=== Condition ===
The site is in ruins, but these are stable and well maintained. The archaeological potential is high.

The quantity, quality and extent of the ruins and landscape features within the Reserve are remarkable.

=== Modifications and dates ===
1881: purchase of existing battery at Sawyer's Creek and construction of a dam, race, aqueduct and flume.

== Heritage listing ==
The site displays considerable uniformity in materials, form and scale. It is enhanced by its setting and contributes to its setting which has remained largely undisturbed since the site was in operation. It is an integral part of the Adelong goldfields landscape. The ingenious application of raw materials and the use of topography to enhance the gold extraction process, stand out for their creative and technological excellence when compared with similar sites in New South Wales. The quantity, quality and extent of the ruins and landscape features within the Reserve are remarkable.

The processes of gold exploration and extraction are some of the most romanticised in Australian history. The Battery complex provides an opportunity to demonstrate how reef gold was extracted as the site is both innovative and relatively intact.

Adelong Falls Gold Workings was listed on the New South Wales State Heritage Register on 2 April 1999 having satisfied the following criteria.

The place is important in demonstrating aesthetic characteristics and/or a high degree of creative or technical achievement in New South Wales.

The site displays considerable uniformity in materials, form and scale. It is enhanced by its setting and contributes to its setting which has remained largely undisturbed since the site was in operation. It is an integral part of the Adelong goldfields landscape.

The place has potential to yield information that will contribute to an understanding of the cultural or natural history of New South Wales.

The ingenious application of raw materials and the use of topography to enhance the gold extraction process, stand out for their creative and technological excellence when compared with similar sites in New South Wales.

The processes of gold exploration and extraction are some of the most romanticised in Australian history. The Battery complex provides an opportunity to demonstrate how reef gold was extracted as the site is both innovative and relatively intact.

== See also ==
- Adelong Creek
- Buddle pit
- Reverberatory furnace
- Stamper battery
