= Doubtful Creek =

River in New South Wales, Australia

Coordinates: 36°06′S 148°26′E

Doubtful Doubtful River
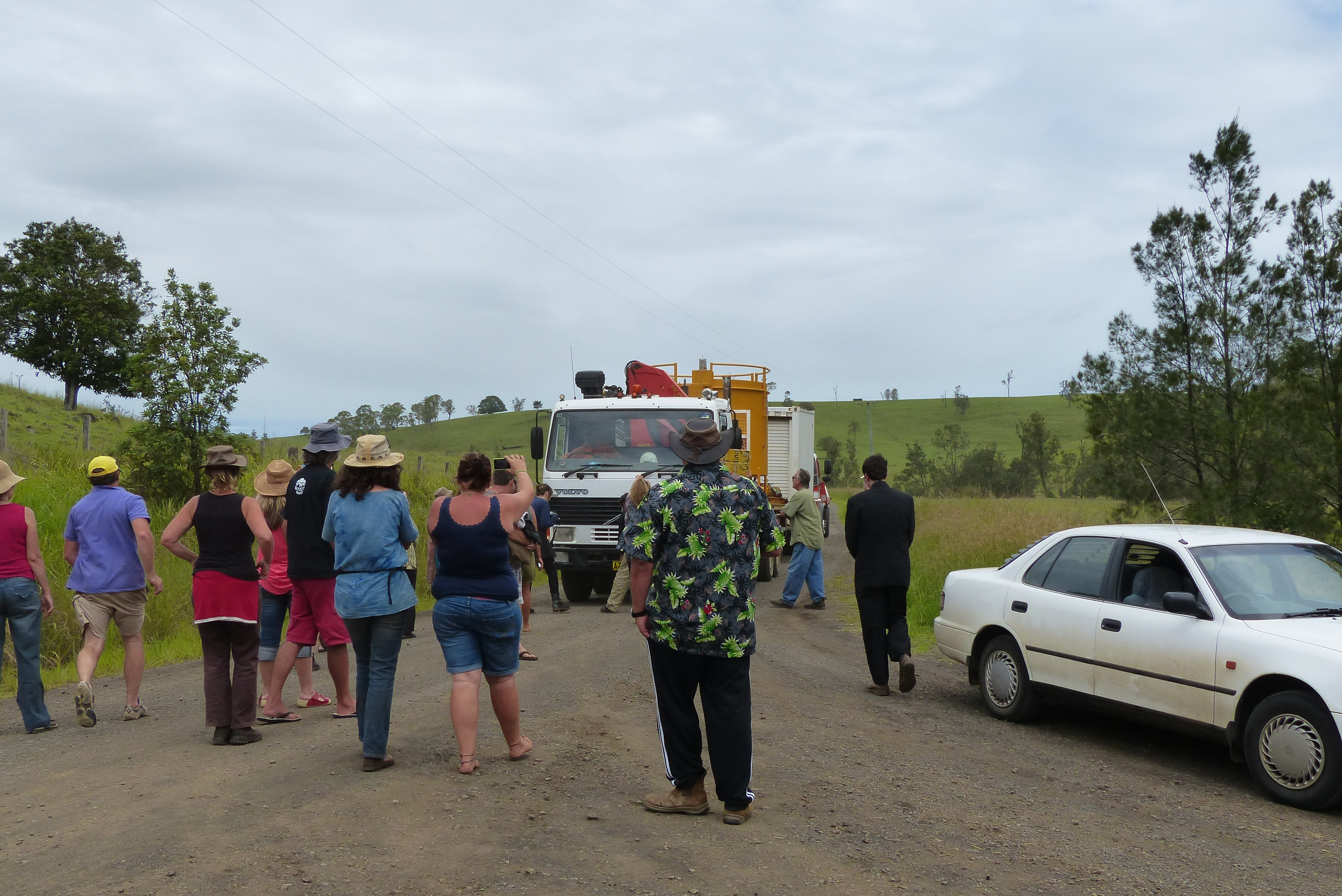
- Doubtful Creek, 7 February 2013

Location
- Country: Australia
- State: New South Wales
- Region: Australian Alps (IBRA), Snowy Mountains
- Local government areas: Tumbarumba, Tumut

Physical characteristics
- Source: Munyang Range, Snowy Mountains
  - location: north of North Bulls Peak
  - elevation: 1,660 m (5,450 ft)
- Mouth: confluence with the Tumut River
  - location: The Gulf Mine
  - elevation: 1,290 m (4,230 ft)
- Length: 15 km (9.3 mi)

Basin features
- River system: Murrumbidgee catchment, Murray–Darling basin

Doubtful Creek, formerly known as Doubtful River, a watercourse that is part of the Murrumbidgee catchment within the Murray–Darling basin, is located in the Snowy Mountains district of New South Wales, Australia.

The river rises on the north western side of the Munyang Range in the Snowy Mountains at 1,660 metres (5,450 ft) and flows generally north west towards its confluence with the Tumut River at The Gulf Mine, descending 380 metres (1,250 ft) over its 15-kilometre (9.3 mi) course.

== See also ==
- List of rivers of Australia
- Rivers of New South Wales
