= Goobarragandra River =

Coordinates: 35°20′S 148°15′E

Goobarragandra
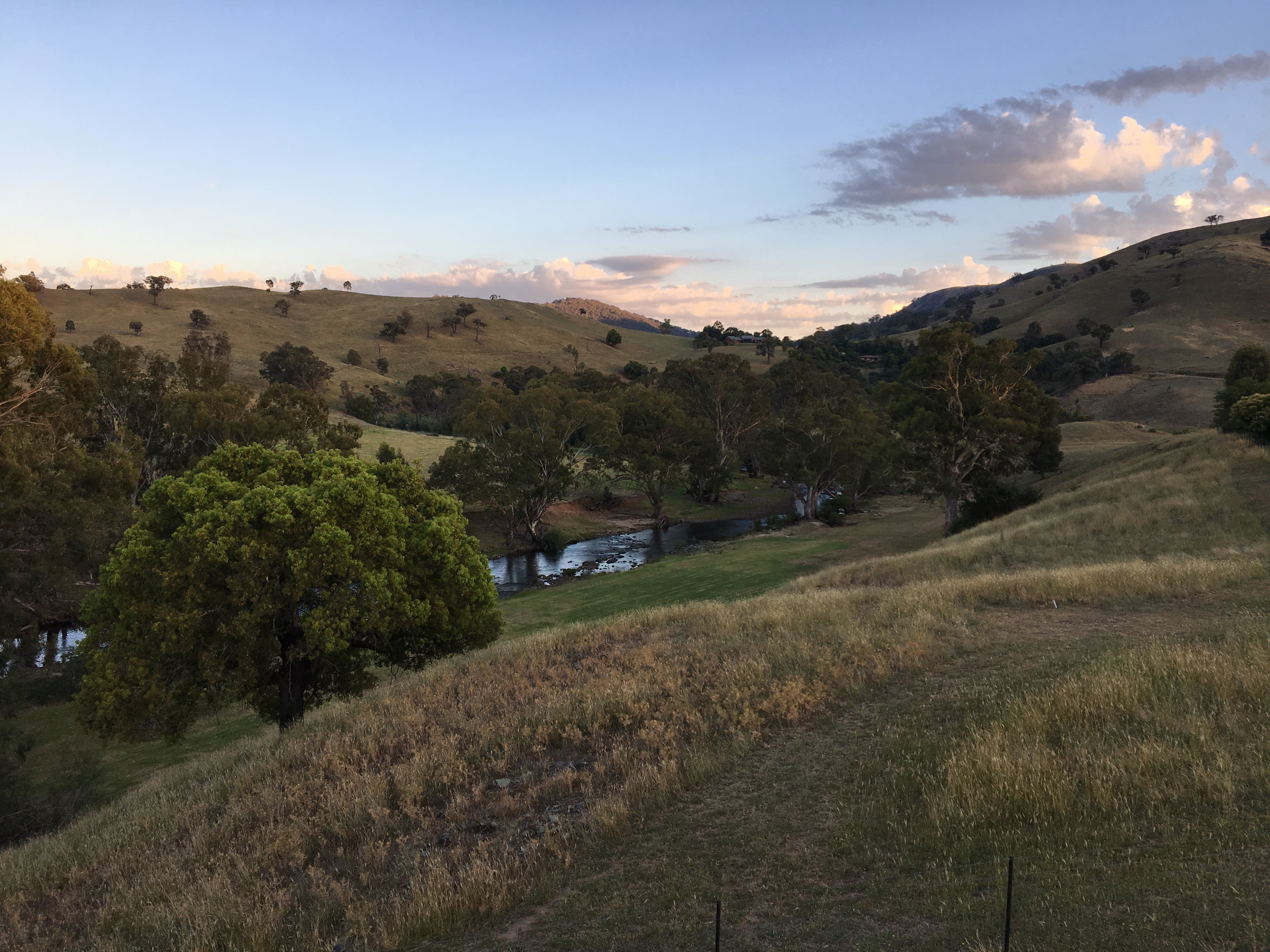

Location
- Country: Australia
- State: New South Wales
- Region: Australian Alps (IBRA), Snowy Mountains
- Local government area: Snowy Valleys

Physical characteristics
- Source: Fiery Range, Snowy Mountains
  - location: north of Peppercorn Hill
  - elevation: 1,330 m (4,360 ft)
- Mouth: confluence with the Tumut River
  - location: Tumut
  - elevation: 272 m (892 ft)
- Length: 56 km (35 mi)

Basin features
- River system: Murrumbidgee catchment, Murray–Darling basin
- Tributaries
  - left: Peak River, Feints Creek
  - right: Sandy (Waterfall) Creek, Emu Flat Creek, Broken Cart Creek

Goobarragandra River, a perennial stream that is part of the Murrumbidgee catchment within the Murray–Darling basin, is located in the Snowy Mountains region of New South Wales, Australia. In the past, it was also known as Tumut Little River.

== Course and features ==
The river rises on the north western side of the Fiery Range in the Snowy Mountains at 1,330 metres (4,360 ft) and flows generally north west, joined by five minor tributaries towards its mouth at the confluence with the Tumut River at Tumut; dropping 1,060 metres (3,480 ft) over the course of the river's length of 56 kilometres (35 mi).

The river flows through the locality of Goobarragandra; and the Hume and Hovell Walking Track follows the river for a short duration, about 10 kilometres (6.2 mi) south of Tumut.

There are large waterfalls and rapids along this river. There are "camping" spots along the Goobarragandra River as well.

== See also ==
- List of rivers of New South Wales (A–K)
- List of rivers of Australia
- Rivers of New South Wales
