= Tumut River =

River in Australia

Tumut Doomut
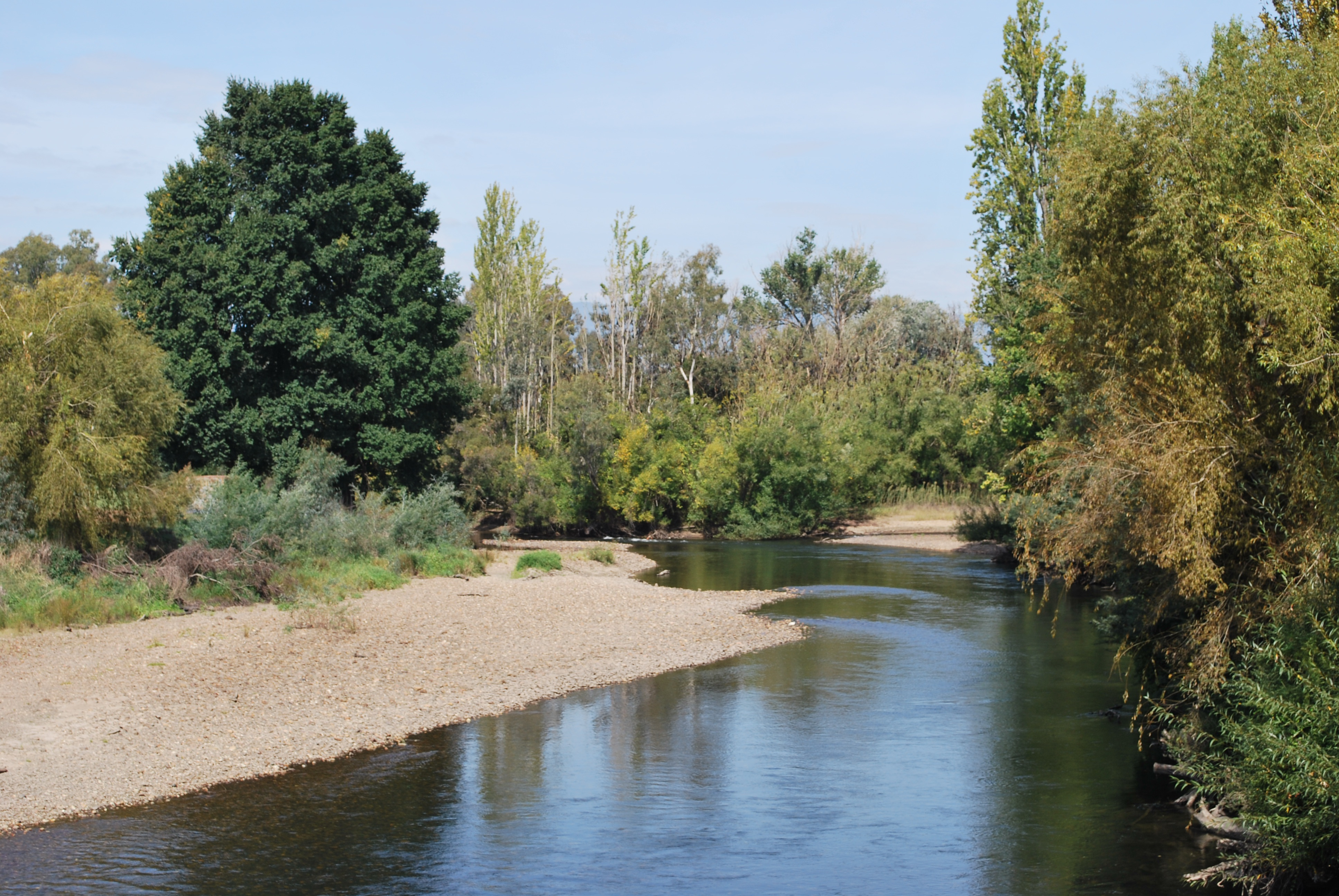
- Tumut River, near Tumut, New South Wales

- Location of the Tumut River mouth in New South Wales
- Etymology: Aboriginal: derived from Doomut or Doomat; meaning camping by the river
- Native name: Doomut (Wiradjuri); Bewuck

Location
- Country: Australia
- State: New South Wales
- Region: Australian Alps (IBRA), South Eastern Highlands (IBRA), Snowy Mountains, South West Slopes
- Municipalities: Tumut, Gundagai

Physical characteristics
- Source: Toolong Range, Snowy Mountains
  - location: west of Mount Jagungal
  - coordinates: 36°5′18″S 148°23′5″E
  - elevation: 1,430 m (4,690 ft)
- Mouth: confluence with the Murrumbidgee River
  - location: near Gundagai
  - coordinates: 35°1′18″S 148°10′51″E
  - elevation: 220 m (720 ft)
- Length: 182 km (113 mi)
- Basin size: 4,000 km^{2} (1,500 sq mi)

Basin features
- River system: Murrumbidgee catchment, Murray–Darling basin
- Tributaries
  - left: Long Creek (Tumut), Buddong Creek, Gilmore Creek
  - right: Bogong Creek, Doubtful Creek, Happy Jacks Creek, Jounama Creek, McGregors Creek, Blowering Creek, Goobarragandra River, Brungle Creek
- Dams: Happy Jacks, Tumut Pond, Tumut Two, Talbingo, Jounama, Blowering

The Tumut River (/ˈtjuːmət/), a perennial stream that is part of the Murrumbidgee catchment within the Murray–Darling basin, is located in the Snowy Mountains and South West Slopes districts of New South Wales, Australia.

== Location and features ==
The Tumut River rises on the northern face of Mount Jagungal in the Snowy Mountains at 1,430 metres (4,690 ft) and flows generally north by west, joined by twelve tributaries including the Doubtful Creek, Happy Jacks Creek and Goobarragandra River before meeting its confluence with the Murrumbidgee River, at Darbalara near the town of Gundagai, descending 1,210 metres (3,970 ft) over its 182-kilometre (113 mi) course.

Between Cabramurra and Tumut, the natural course of the Tumut River has been altered as a result of the construction of the Snowy Mountains Scheme. A series of sixteen major dams and seven hydro-electric power stations were constructed between 1949 and 1974 to harness the flow of the Tumut and Snowy rivers. The Tumut River is impounded by six dams, located at Happy Jacks Dam, Tumut Pond Dam, Tumut Two Dam, Talbingo Dam, Jounama Dam, and Blowering Dam. Four hydro-power stations are located adjacent to the river flow. Although a relatively short river, it undergoes prolonged periods of high flow during the snowmelt season. The natural flow of the river is additionally amplified by water transferred from the Tooma River and Lake Eucumbene by the Snowy Mountains Scheme.

The river is crossed by the heritage-listed Junction Bridge at Tumut.

== Etymology ==
The word Tumut is derived from the Wiradjuri word doomut or doomat, meaning camping by the river.

== Environmental concerns ==
The Tumut River has been subject to considerable debate and lobbying on environmental grounds. The Tumut River has been widely documented as suffering from the effects of the un-natural flow regime resulting from the creation of the Snowy Mountain Scheme and the irrigation demand downstream of the Tumut River. Environmental damage attributed to the management of the Tumut River by the Government of New South Wales includes;

- Erosion of river banks – quoted as approximating 2 hectares (4.9 acres) of lost land per 1 kilometre (0.62 mi) of river frontage.
- Waterlogging (souring) of low-lying land along the river.
- Isolation of historical anabranches of the river (e.g. Holt's anabranch which is now regularly cut off at low flows.) The historic village of Brungle has been the subject of considerable media coverage on both Prime and WIN TV regarding river flows and water quality.
- Thermal pollution (low water temperatures) resulting from the "bottom of the dam" outlet of Blowering Dam.
- Loss of flora and fauna (e.g. platypuses) from the extreme changes in water level from high irrigation flows to winter flows of less than 500 megalitres (18×10^{6} cu ft) per day.
- Rock facing of river banks to attempt to control erosion caused by high irrigation flows.

== Sporting and leisure activities ==
The Tumut River has been a popular destination for a variety of sport and leisure activities including;

- Canoeing/Kayaking – there are many excellent opportunities for canoeing downstream of Blowering Dam. Canoeing activities are often limited to higher flows as winter low flows are very difficult to paddle. Paddling is very pleasant at discharges above 2,000 megalitres (71×10^{6} cu ft) per day at Blowering Dam. The Tumut Valley Canoe Club are regular paddlers of the Tumut River. They meet at 5pm on Wednesday during Summer at their clubhouse which is next to the Riverglade caravan park Tumut.
- Fishing – Fishing on the Tumut River is now limited to cold water species e.g. introduced trout species. The low temperatures of the river due to the bottom of the dam releases from Blowering Dam have virtually eliminated native fish species.

== See also ==
- List of rivers of Australia
- List of rivers of New South Wales (L–Z)
- Rivers of New South Wales
- Round Mountain
- Tooma River
