= Tumut and Kunama railway lines =

Disused railway lines in the south of New South Wales, Australia

Tumut and Kunama lines
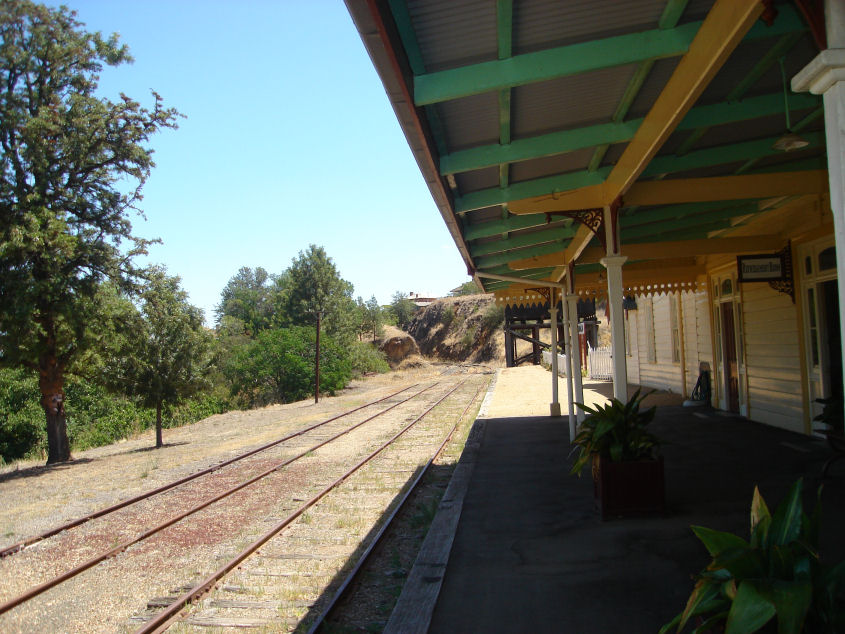
- Gundagai station

Technical
- Track gauge: 1,435 mm (4 ft 8 1/2 in)

The Tumut (/ˈtjuːmət/) and Kunama railway lines are disused railway lines in the south of New South Wales, Australia. The Tumut line was a 104 kilometres (65 mi) long branch of the Main South line, branching southwards from it at Cootamundra and heading to the town of Tumut. The line served the towns of Tumut and Gundagai, where the line crosses the Murrumbidgee River with a large iron girder bridge and wooden viaduct. Villages on the line included Brawlin, Muttama, Coolac and Tumblong (previously named Adelong Crossing).

The Kunama railway line was a small 35-kilometre (22 mi) branch of the Tumut line, branching from it at Gilmore, 5 kilometres (3 mi) southwest of Tumut, passing through the town of Batlow before ending in Kunama. The branch connection faced towards Tumut.

== History ==
The first mention of a Cootamundra to Gundagai extension was in a public meeting held 27 May 1874 where Mr E.A. Fitzgerald moved the following resolution, "That this meeting is of the opinion that the residents of Tumut should co-operate with the inhabitants of Gundagai and Adelong, for the purpose of inducing Government to construct a branch line of railway from Cootamundra to Gundagai." At this time, it was cheaper to obtain goods from Melbourne than it was from Sydney but storekeepers in the area, "would be only too happy to establish trade with Sydney."

Plans had been drawn up for the line from Cootamundra to Gundagai but were destroyed in the Garden Palace (Sydney) fire in 1882.

The Department of Public Works, Sydney, published a request for tenders 6 August 1883 for construction of the line from Cootamundra to Gundagai with a closing date of 2 October 1883. Plate-laying of the branch line commenced in early August 1884.

The Tumut line opened as far as Gundagai on 10 November 1885. With the passing of Act No. 43 1900 by the New South Wales Government, a budget of £161,181 ($25,323,415 in 2020) was allocated and the line was finally extended 31 miles 35 chains (50.6 km; 31.4 mi) "subject to such deviations and modifications as may be considered desirable" to Tumut via Gilmore (formerly named "Killarney") on 12 October 1903.

Initially, three return mixed goods trains operated on Tuesday, Thursday, and Saturday. The journey time was almost five hours when boarding in Cootamundra at 7:00am and arriving in Tumut at 11:55am (15 hours travel time if boarding in Sydney). The return journey was also almost five hours leaving Tumut at 2:25pm and arriving in Cootamundra at 7:20pm.

The Gilmore to Batlow Railway Act, 1919, allocated £110,000 ($8,926,014 in 2020), for the construction of 21 miles 75 chains (35.3 km; 21.9 mi) starting 21 chains (422 m; 1,396 ft) on the Sydney-side of Gilmore Station, to Batlow.

The branch to Batlow was officially opened 22 March 1923 (however, revenue traffic was running prior to this date), and the extension to Kunama was opened 17 December 1923. Services connected with the Tumut-Cootamundra service at Gilmore on Mondays, Wednesdays, and Fridays. The service would take two hours departing from Gilmore at 11:40am and arrive in Batlow at 1:45pm. The return journey would be Tuesdays, Thursdays, and Saturdays departing Batlow at 11.10am and arriving in Gilmore at 1:16pm.

The steep Kunama line was mainly used for fruit haulage from the orchards surrounding Batlow with no dedicated passenger service provided. However, passengers were permitted to travel in the brake van on the shunting service to Kunama. The line beyond Batlow was formally closed in 1961 and the line has been lifted. Services to Batlow were suspended in 1983.

The Tumut line was suspended after flooding in 1984, and part of the alignment has been destroyed by Hume Highway upgrading works. The substantial Gundagai railway station was restored in the 1990s, and is the longest timber railway station in New South Wales.

Clarrie Chippindale served as station master at Tumut from 1966 to 1979.

The Tumut railway station was used as a model railway display of the Tumut branch line but is now closed.

== See also ==
- Rail transport in New South Wales

== Gallery ==
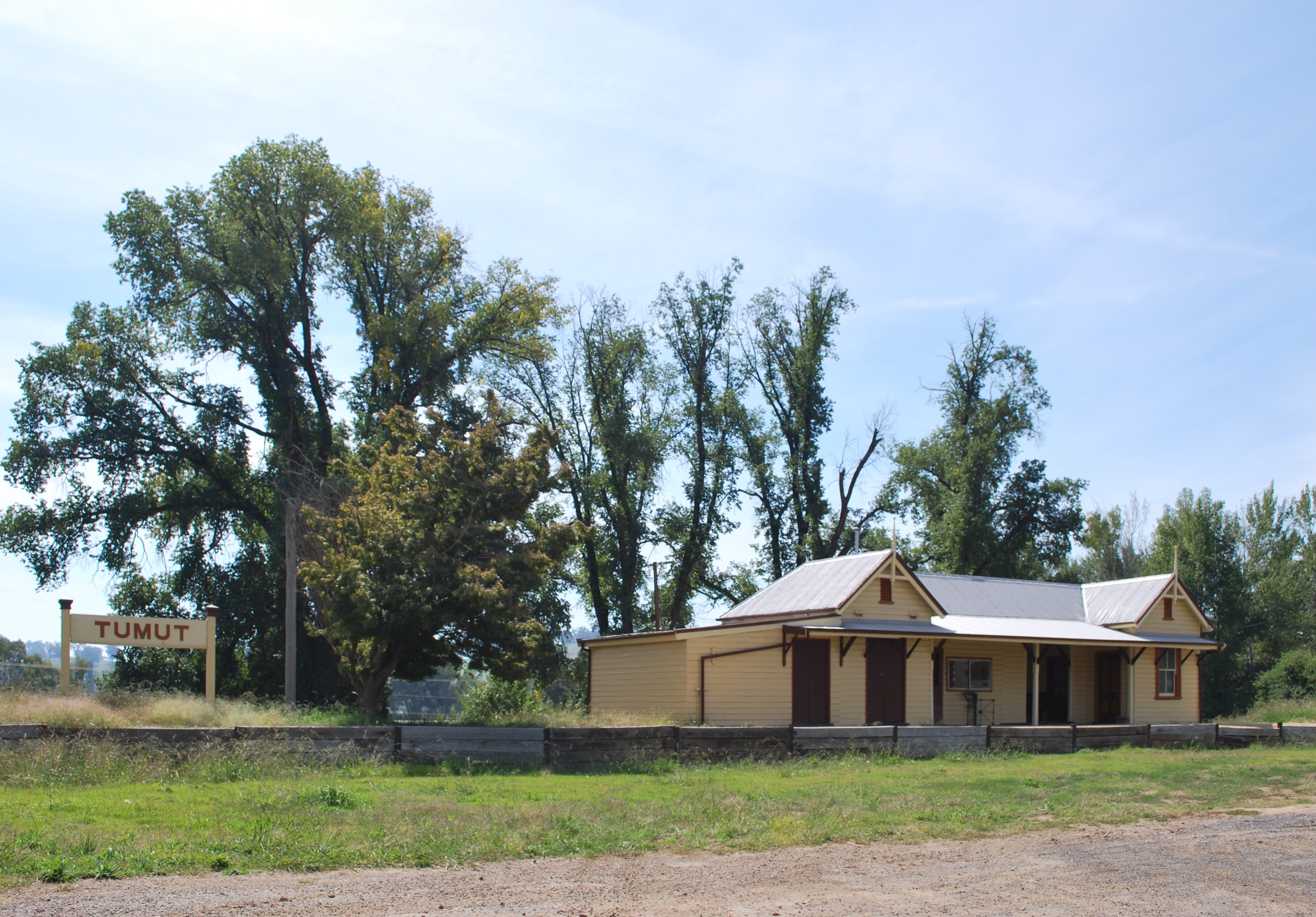
Tumut railway station

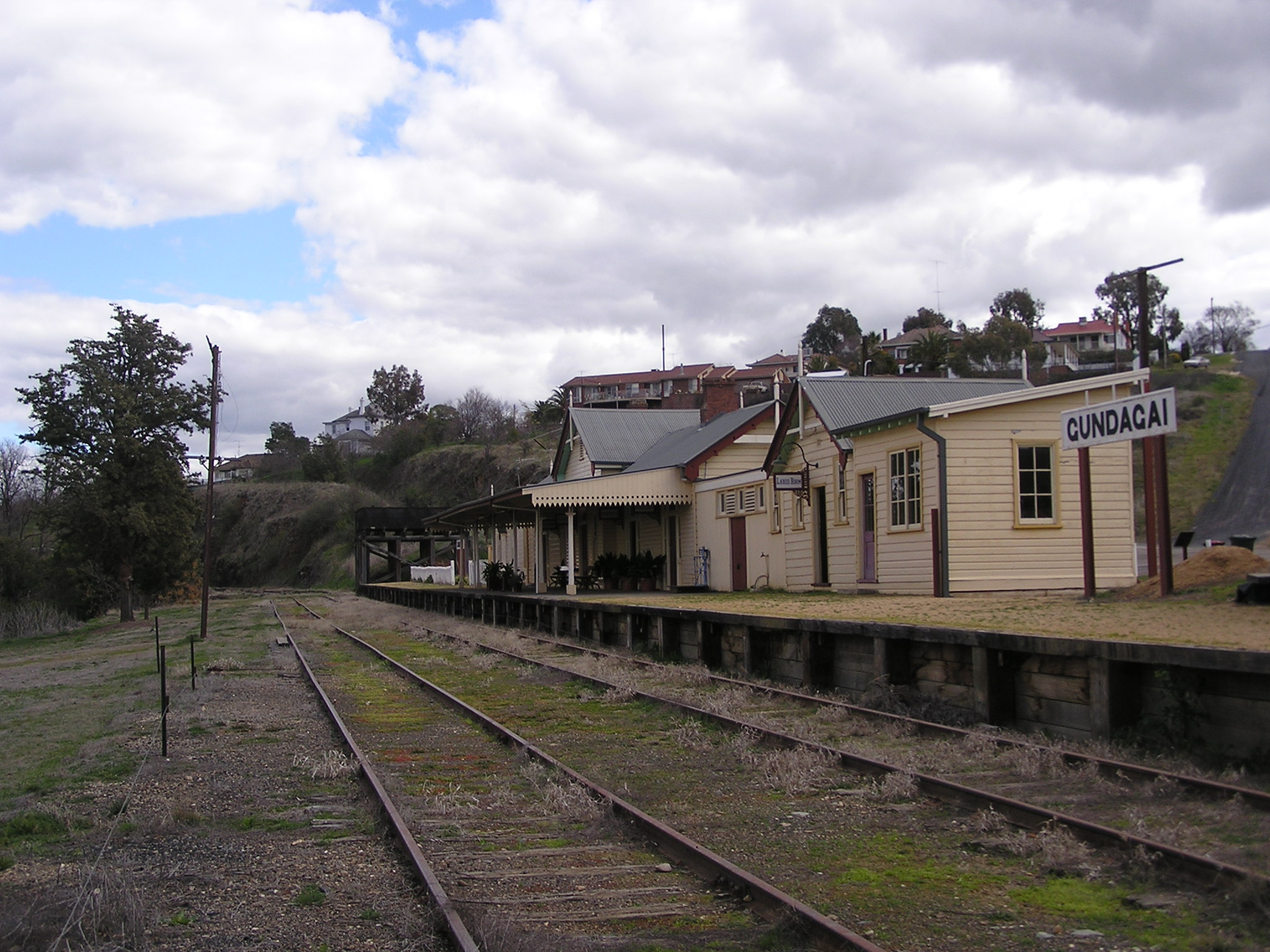
Gundagai railway station

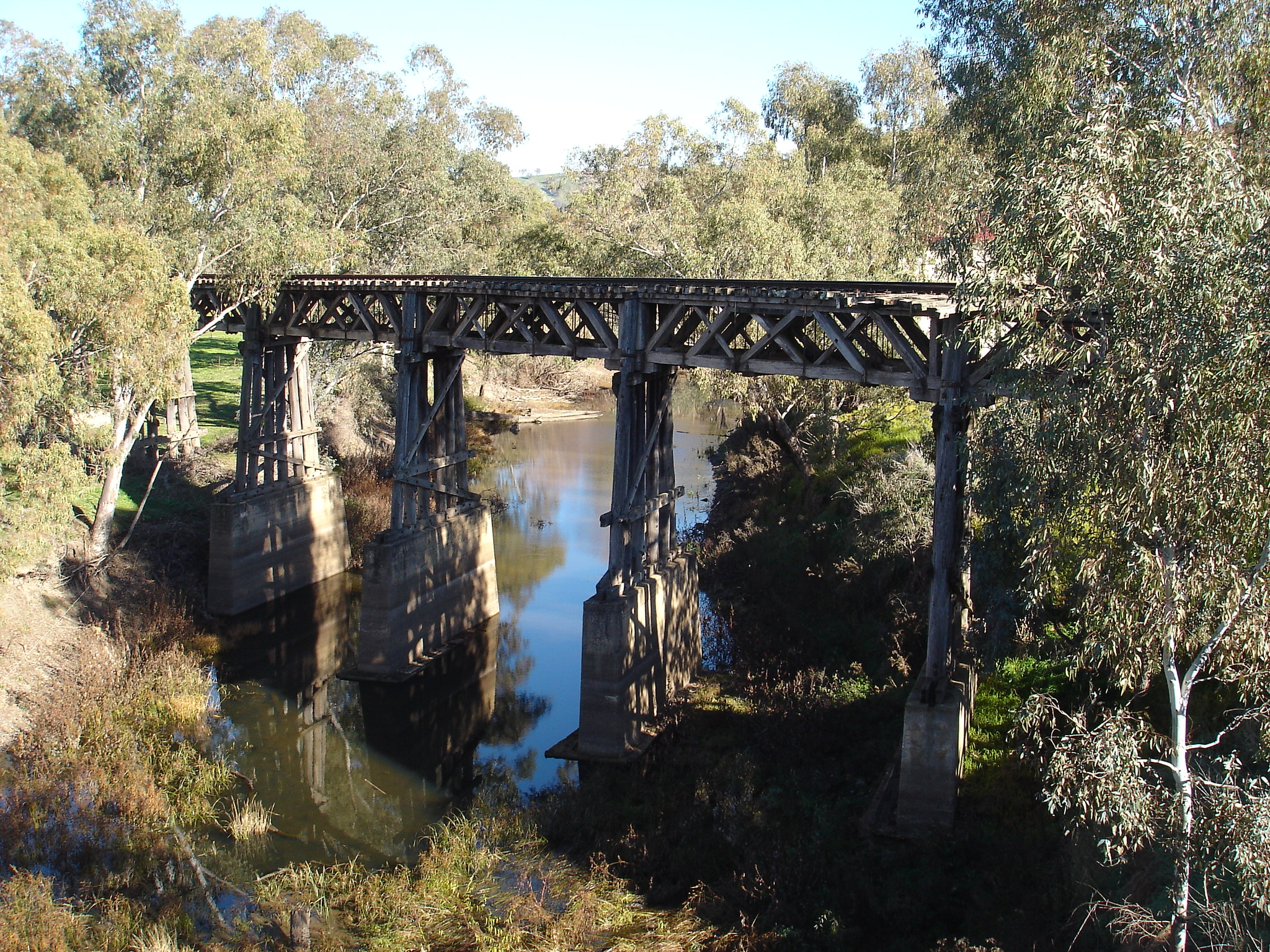
Bridge over the Morleys Creek at Gundagai
