= Holbrook, New South Wales =

Holbrook
- Town
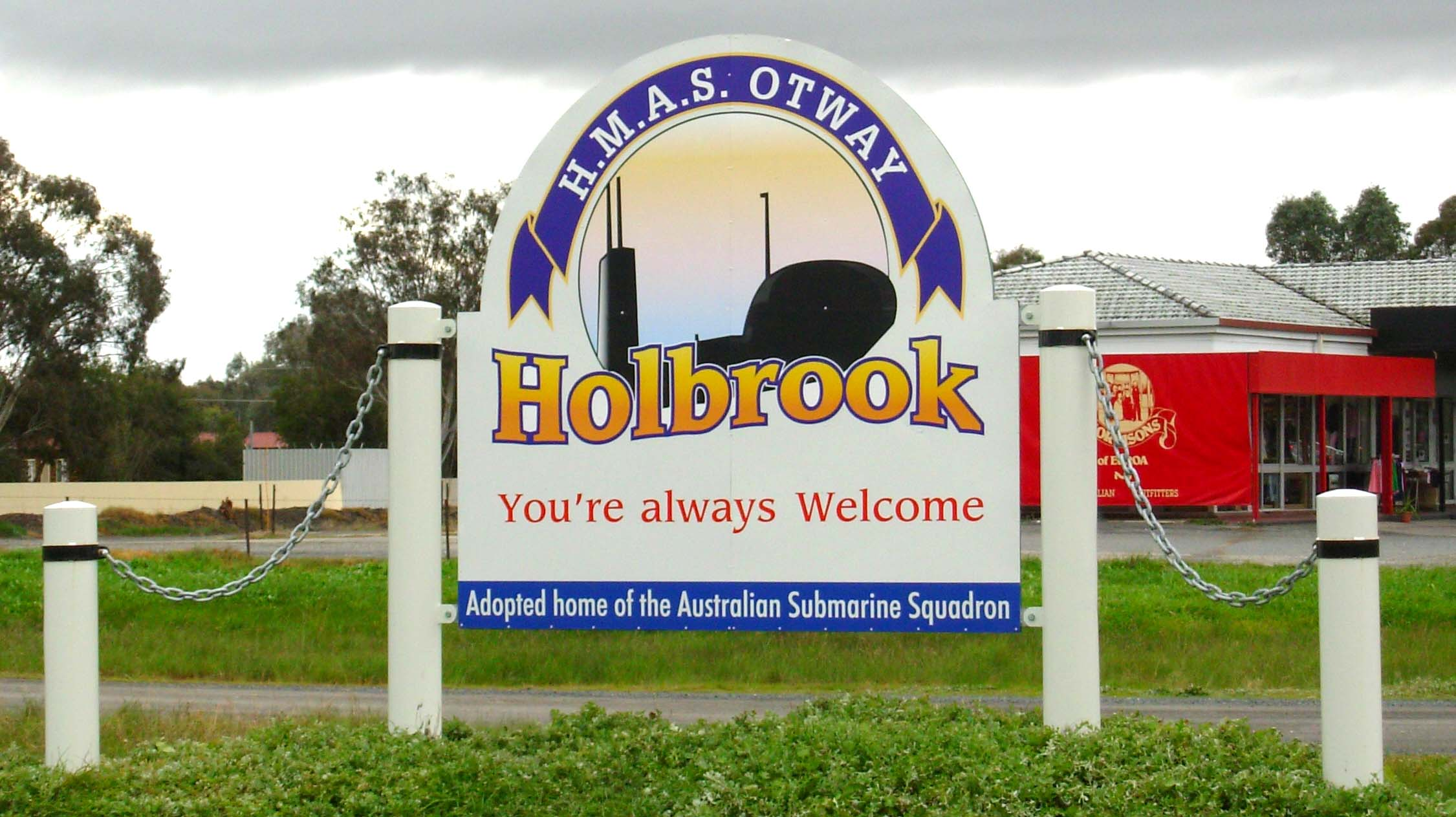
- Holbrook town entry sign

- Interactive map of Holbrook
- Coordinates: 35°43′06″S 147°19′04″E
- Country: Australia
- State: New South Wales
- LGA: Greater Hume Shire Council
- Location: 64 km (40 mi) NE of Albury; 96 km (60 mi) E of Wagga Wagga; 70 km (43 mi) SW of Tarcutta; 492 km (306 mi) SW of Sydney; 384 km (239 mi) NE of Melbourne
- Established: 1836

Government
  - State electorate: Albury
  - Federal division: Farrer
- Elevation: 289 m (948 ft)

Population
  - Total: 1,650 (2021 census)
- Postcode: 2644
- County: Goulburn
Localities around Holbrook
		Tarcutta
Culcairn	Holbrook	Tumbarumba
Albury

Holbrook, formerly known as Germanton, is a small town in Southern New South Wales, Australia. It is on the Hume Highway, 384 kilometres (239 mi) by road North East of Melbourne and 492 kilometres (306 mi) by road south-west of Sydney between Tarcutta and Albury. The town is in the Greater Hume Shire which was established in May 2004 from the merger of Culcairn Shire with the majority of Holbrook Shire and part of the Hume Shire. At the 2021 census, Holbrook had a population of 1,650 people. The district around Holbrook is renowned for local produce including merino wool, wheat and other grains, lucerne, fat cattle and lamb.

== History ==
Holbrook is on the traditional lands of the Wiradjuri people.

The explorers Hume and Hovell were the first-known Europeans in the area. They travelled through in 1824 looking for new grazing country in the south of the colony of New South Wales.

The town was originally called Ten Mile Creek and the first buildings were erected in 1836. A German immigrant, John Christopher Pabst, became the publican of the Woolpack Hotel on 29 July 1840 and the area became known as "the Germans". By 1858 the name had evolved into the official name of Germanton, though the postal area retained the name Ten Mile Creek. In 1876 the name Germanton was gazetted and the old name Ten Mile Creek consigned to history.

Ten Mile Creek Post Office opened on 1 January 1857, and was renamed Germanton in 1875.

On 17 August 1878, Germanton hosted the earliest known game of Soccer (Association Football) in New South Wales between Germanton and Yarra Yarra football teams.

During the First World War, the town name was deemed unpatriotic so on 24 August 1915 the town was renamed Holbrook in honour of Lt. Norman Douglas Holbrook, a decorated wartime submarine captain and winner of the Victoria Cross. Lt. Holbrook commanded the submarine HMS B11.

The town was a stop on Old Sydney Road – the road between Sydney and Melbourne. The railway arrived in Germanton in 1902. The town was serviced by the Holbrook branch railway line until the line was closed in 1975.

In 2013, a re-alignment of the Hume Highway around Holbrook was completed so it is now possible to bypass the town.

=== Garryowen ===
Garryowen was a property and small settlement on Little Billabong Creek, about 13 kilometres (8 mi) north-east of Holbrook, in the mid 19th century. A larger settlement was planned but never built.

== Sport ==
Australian rules football, cricket and netball are the most popular sports.

The Holbrook Football Netball Club, founded in 1882, is a member of the Hume Football Netball League which it joined in 1999 and has won senior men's premierships in 2002 and 2022.

It is also home to the Holbrook Cricket Club which plays in the local district association.

The Holbrook Rugby League Club founded in the 1930s and folded in 1991 (known as the Warriors and Bears) was a reasonably successful Group 13 Rugby League team in the 1950s and 1960s.

In the 1930s, the town was part of the route of the annual John Woodman Memorial bicycle handicap race organised by the Albury Wodonga Cycling Club.

== Local landmarks ==
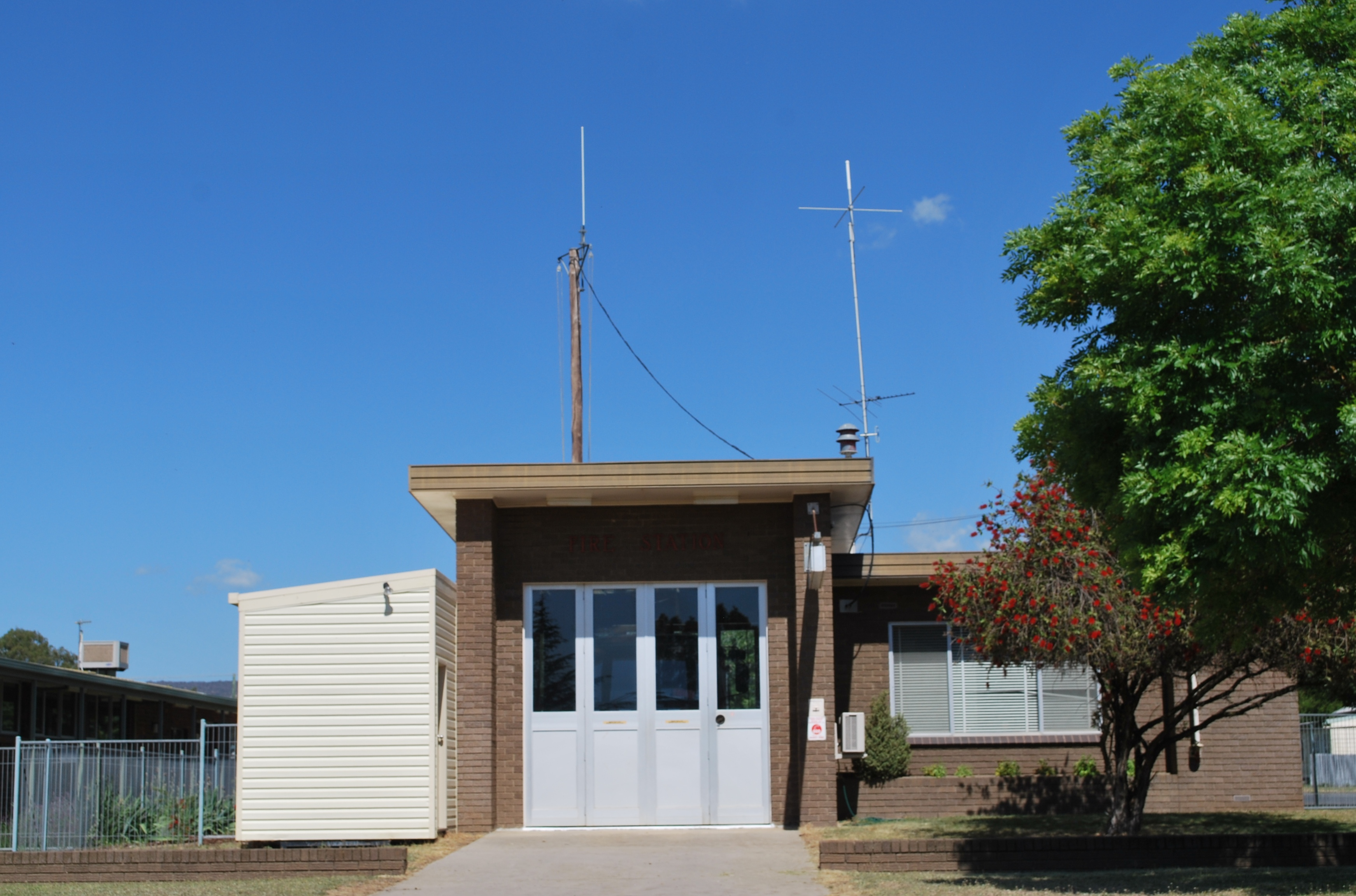
Fire station

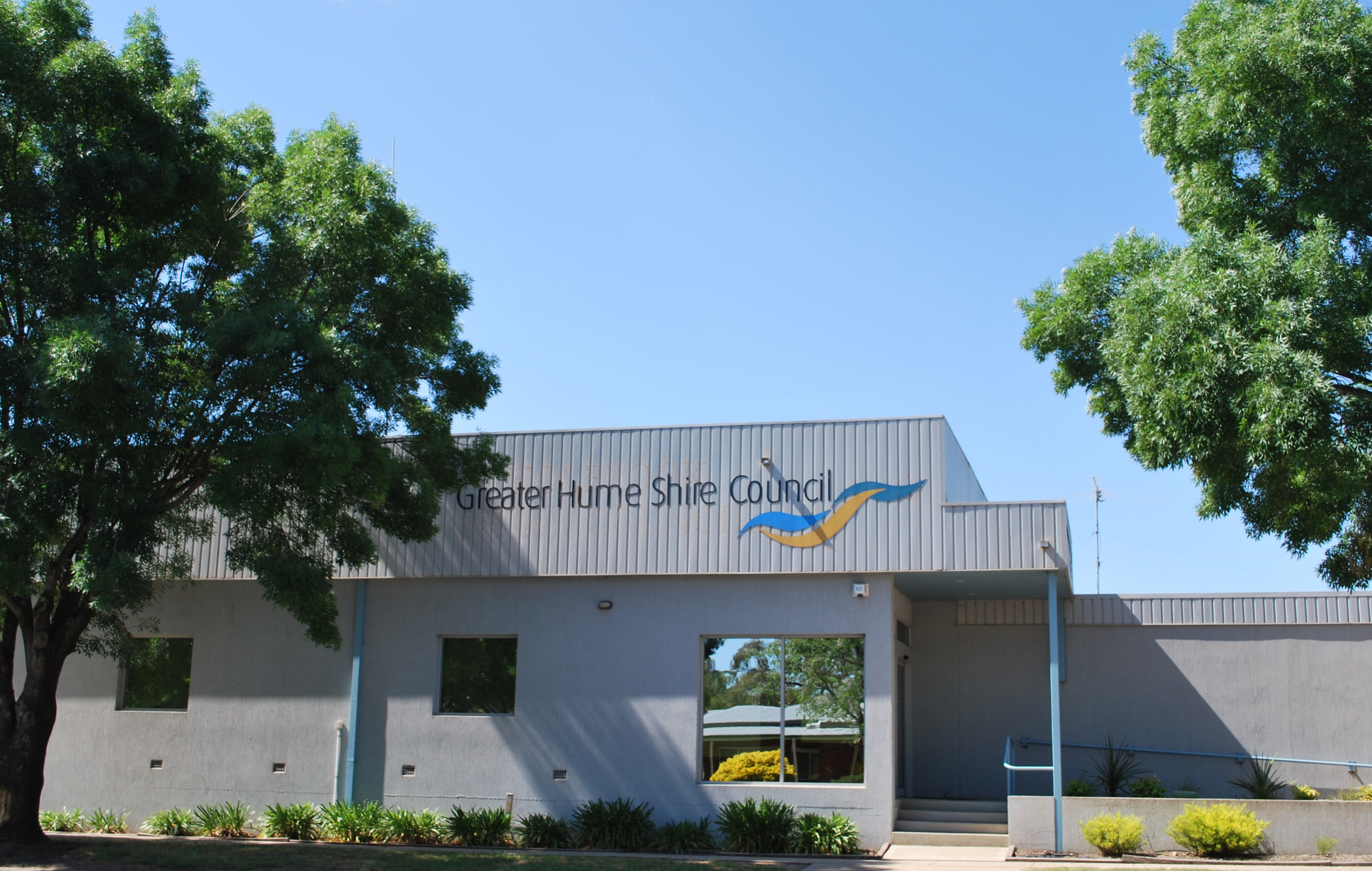
Council offices

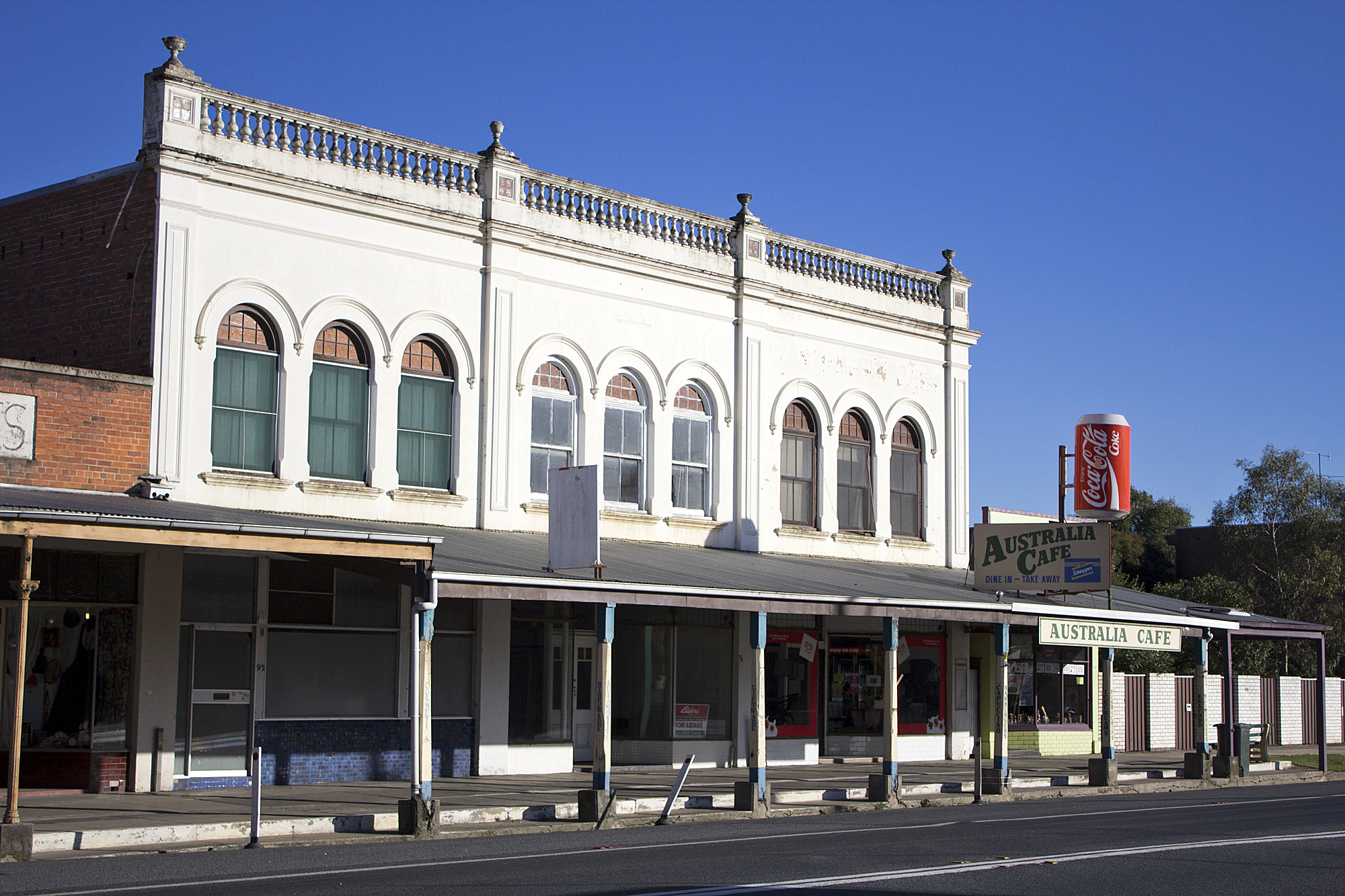
Main street

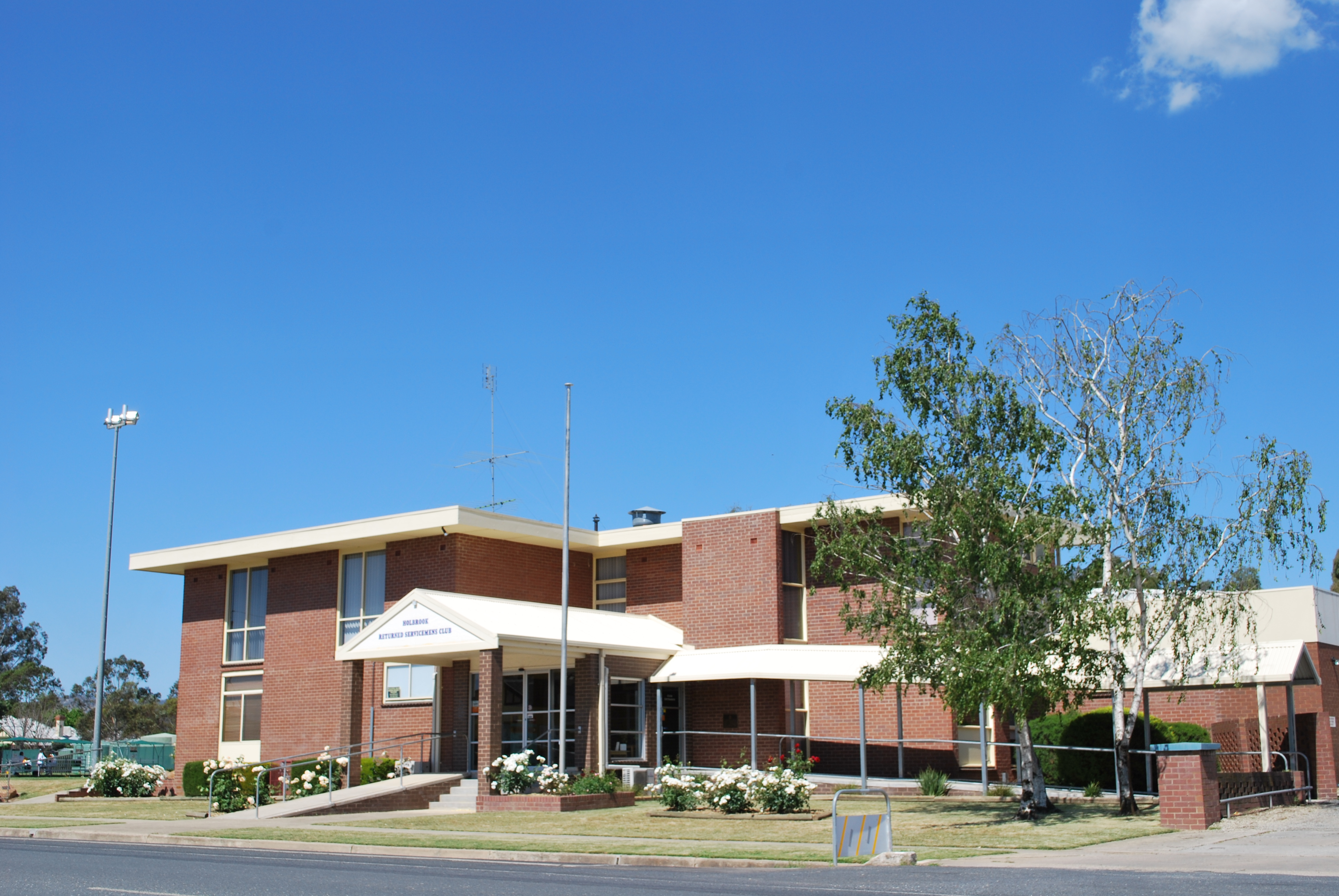
RSL Club

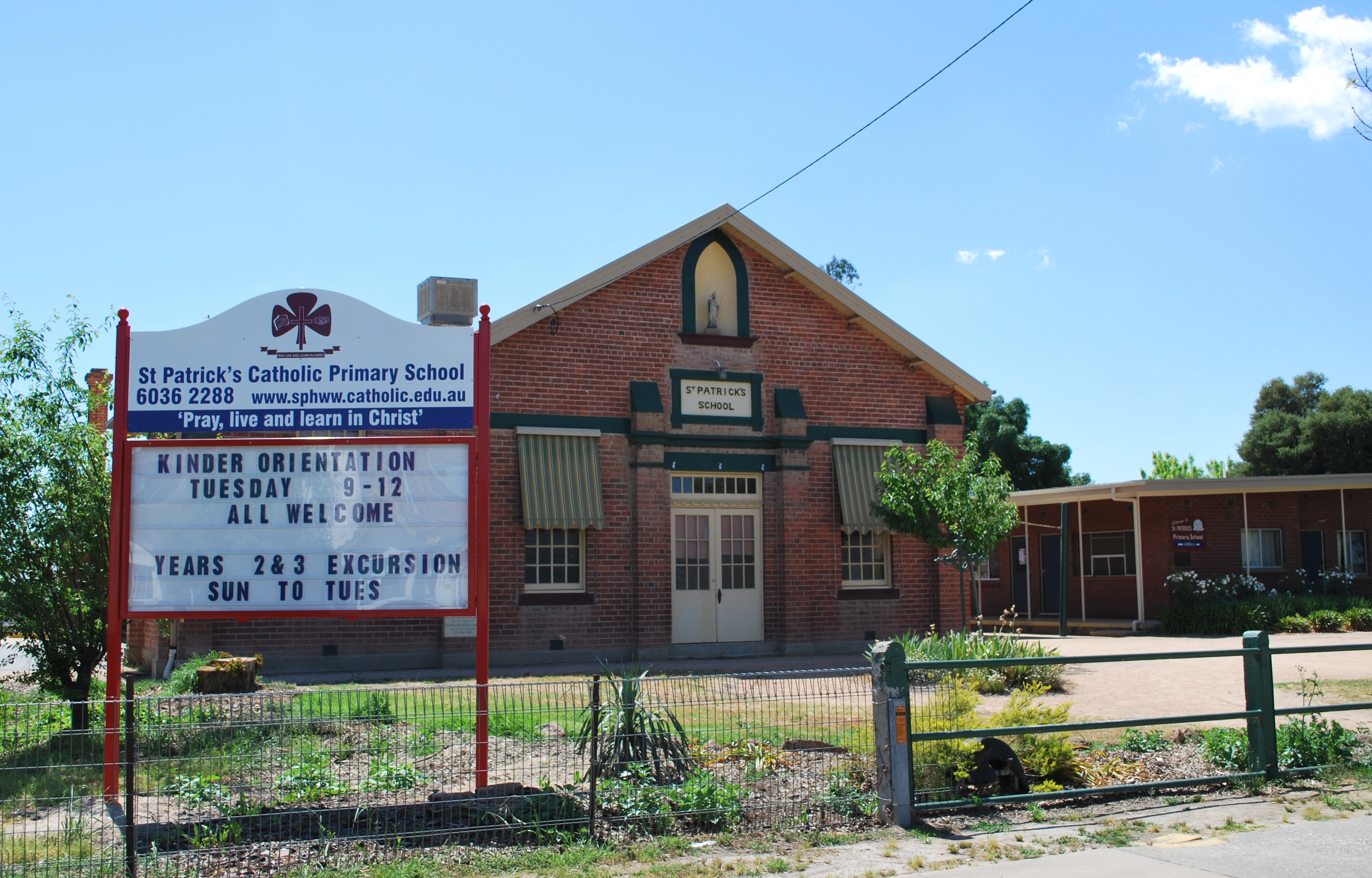
Catholic school

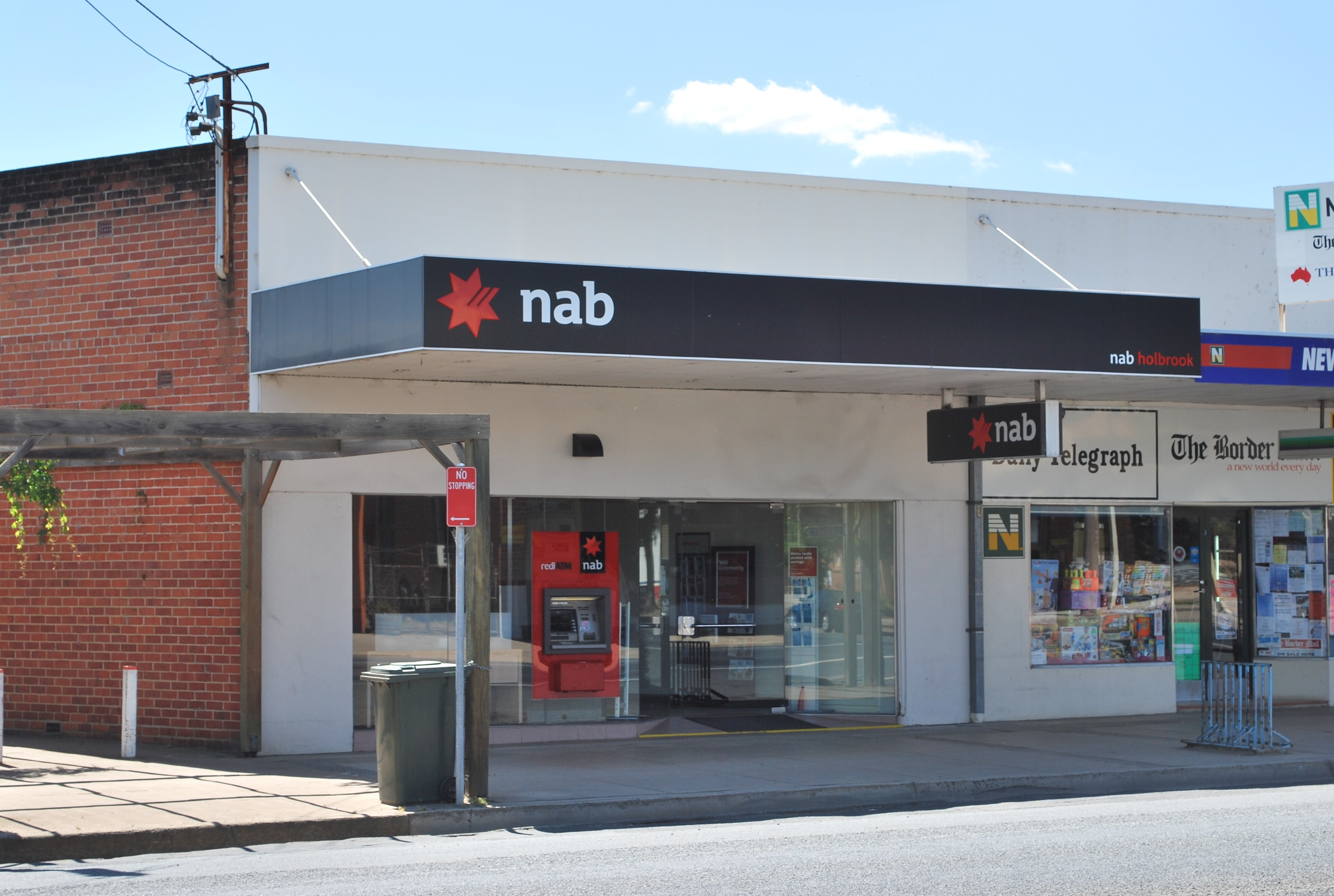
NAB bank

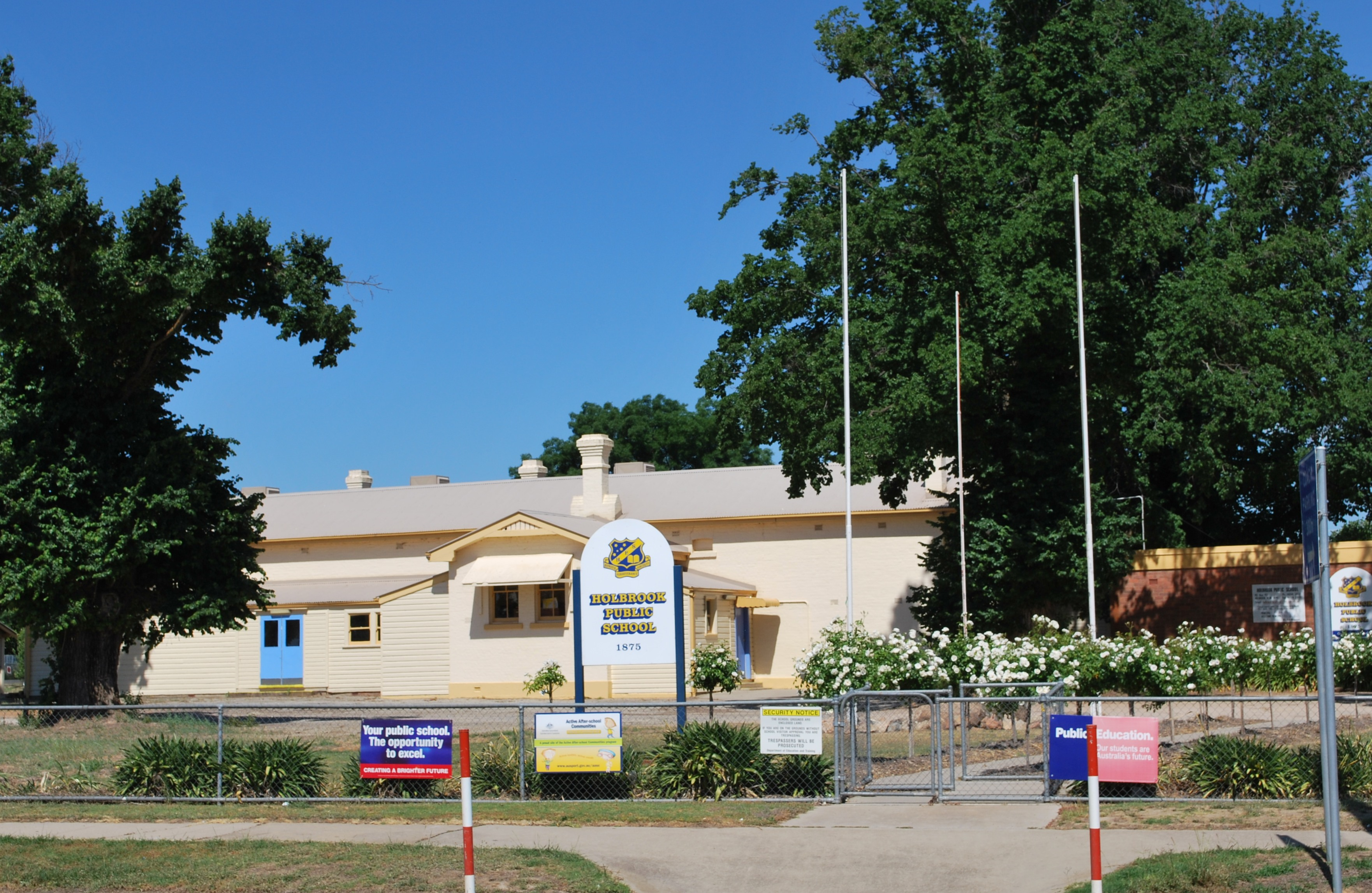
Public school

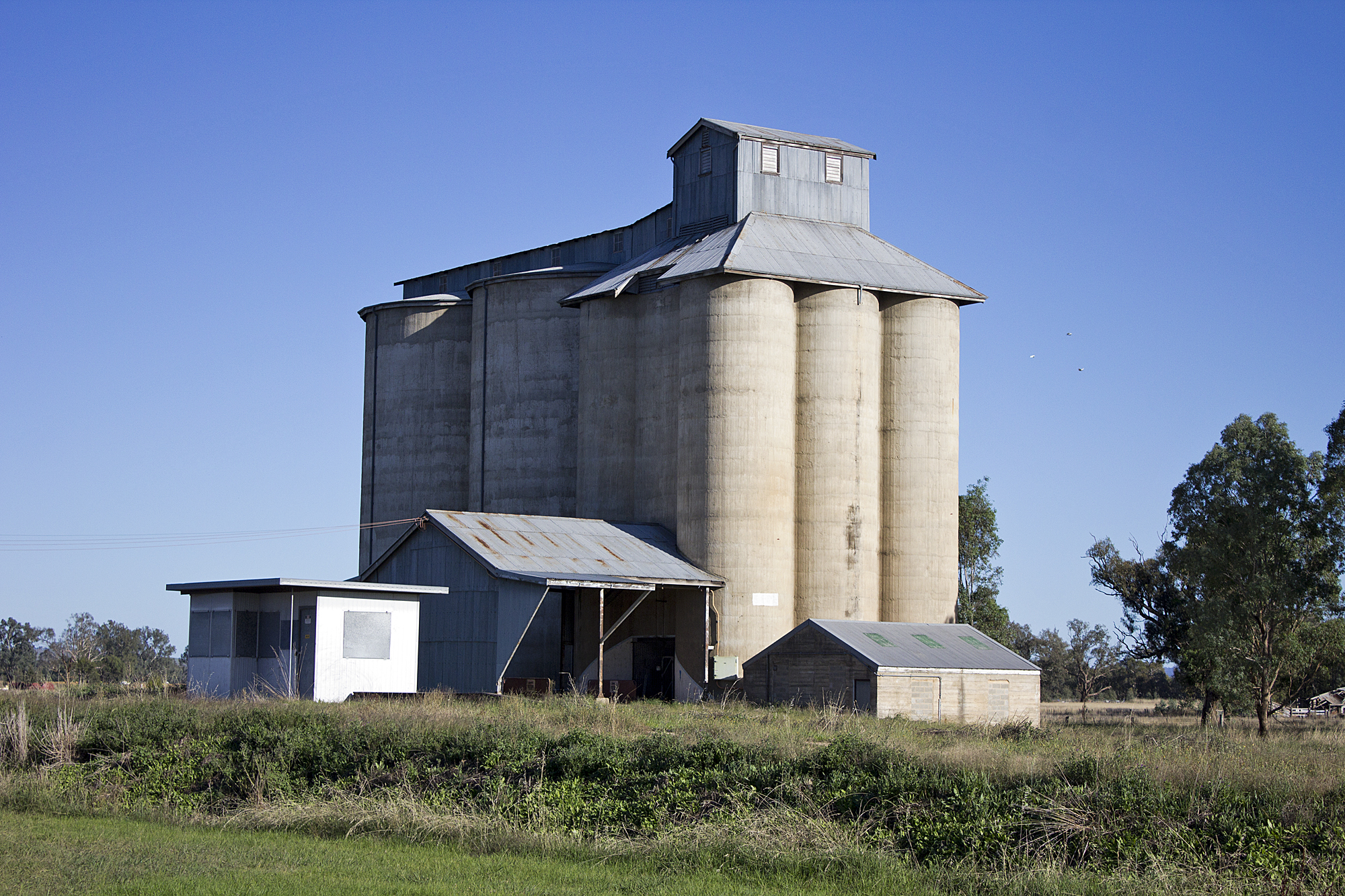
Grain silo

=== HMAS Otway ===
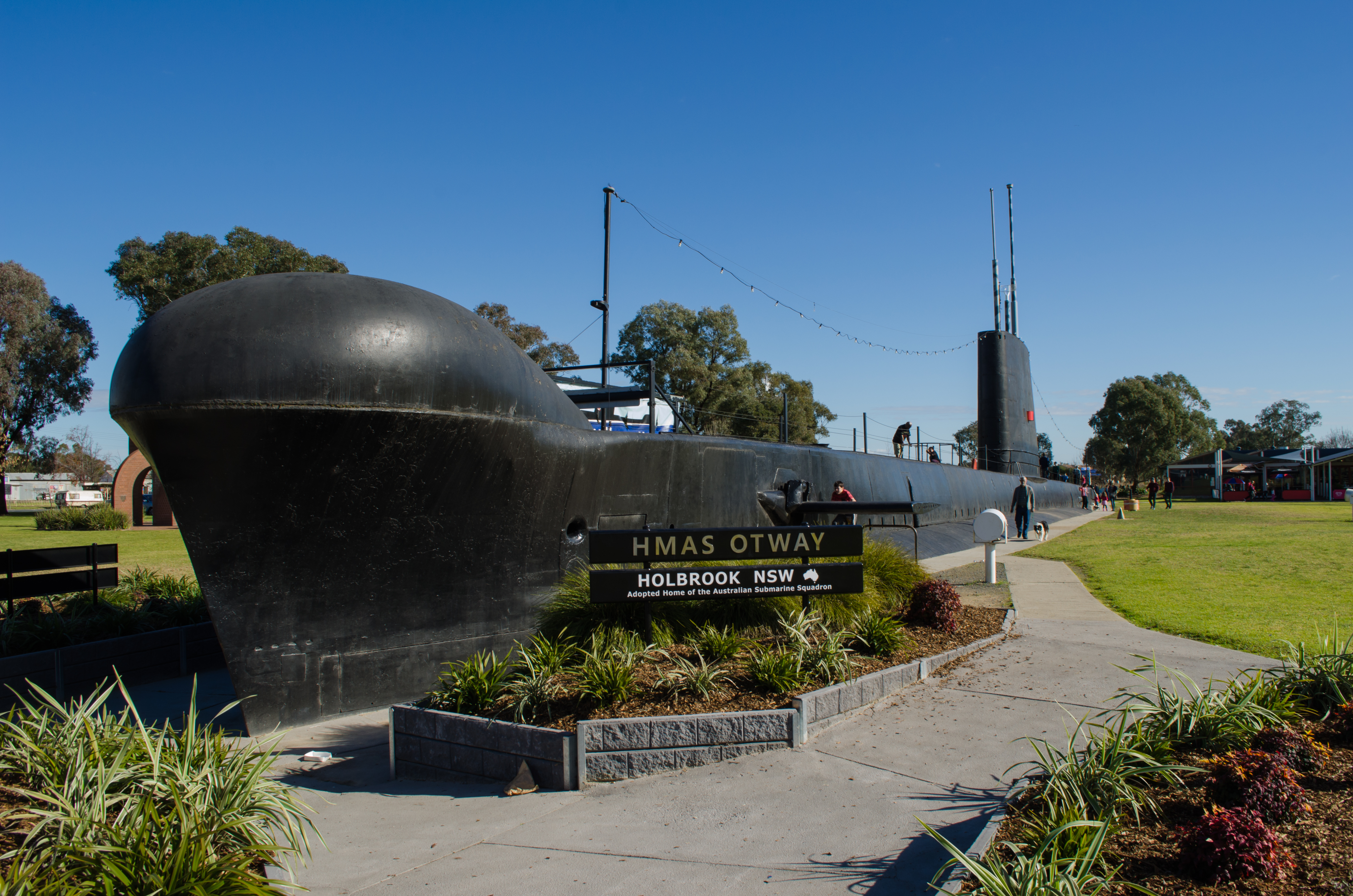
The casing and fin of HMAS Otway, at Holbrook

To honour Lieutenant Holbrook, the town's namesake, the Holbrook council acquired a portion of the hull of HMAS Otway, an Oberon-class submarine, after it was decommissioned by the Royal Australian Navy in 1995. The Navy gifted the fin from the submarine to the town. This resulted in a fund-raiser by the town and district to purchase the whole submarine. This drive was successful in raising $100,000, almost all a gift from Lieutenant Holbrook's widow, Gundula Holbrook. However, this amount was insufficient to purchase all of the Otway. Through negotiations with the scrap yard in Sydney, the town succeeded in purchasing all of the outside casing of Otway above the waterline. This part of the Otway is now displayed in Germanton Park in the heart of Holbrook, having been dedicated on 7–8 June 1997.

=== National Museum of Australian Pottery ===
The National Museum of Australian Pottery is housed in the old A. H. Mackie and Company building. It features over 1500 pieces made from the earliest colonial potteries up to the end of World War I.

== Demographics ==
The population of the town was 1,267 people at the 2001 census. The population of the former Holbrook Shire was 2343 people. The population had declined by 7.4% (186 people) from 1996 and by 10.3% (269 people) since 1991. In 2001 the population of Australia increased by 6% from the 1996 census and 12.6% since the 1991 census.

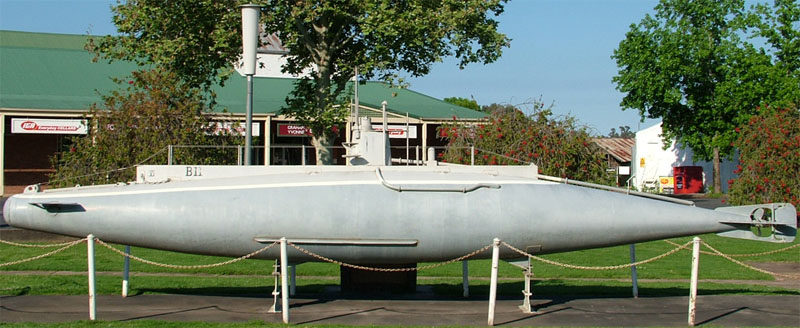
A scale model of the B11 in Holbrook

Less than 1% of the population identified themselves as being of indigenous origin (compared with 2.2% for the whole of Australia).

The median age of people in Holbrook in the 2001 Census was 40 years. In the 1996 Census the median age of people was 37 years, while in the 1991 Census the median age of people was 34 years. The median age for the whole of Australia in 2001 was 35 years.

In the 2001 census, 2104 people (90.0%) stated that they were Australian-born. This compares with 93% in the 1996 Census and 92% in the 1991 Census. In the 2001 Census, the three most common ancestries identified with were: Australian: 1184 people (50.7%); English: 810 people (34.7%) and; Irish: 247 people (10.6%). In 2001 73% of all Australians were Australian born. Across Australia the three most common ancestries identified with were similar to Holbrook but with a reduced percentage identifying Australian ancestry: Australian: 36%; English: 34% and; Irish: 10%.

English was the only language spoken at home by 95.3% of those in the Holbrook local statistical area compared with 80% of Australians.

In the week preceding the 2001 Census, 807 people (34.5%) had used a personal computer at home. The total number of persons who had used the Internet in the week preceding the 2001 Census was 541 (23%). 42% of Australians had used a personal computer at home in the preceding week and 37% of Australians had used the internet.

In the 2001 Census, there were 1078 married people (60%), 53 separated people (3%), 98 divorced people (6%), 165 widowed people (9%) and 397 people who had never been married (22%). 51% of Australians were married at the time of the census.

In the 2001 Census, 22 (1.2%) people held a postgraduate degree, graduate diploma or graduate certificate. This compares with 3% of the Australian population. 106 (6%) people held a bachelor's degree, compared with 10% of the Australian population. There were 385 (21%) people with an advanced diploma, diploma or certificate in the 2001 Census, compared with 22% of the Australian population. 1289 (72%) people did not have a qualification, did not state a qualification or stated a qualification outside of the scope of the standard classification; this compares with 65% of the Australian population.

During the week prior to Census Night 2001, 1021 people in Holbrook statistical local area were employed, representing 96% of the labour force. Of these, 658 (64.4%) people (485 males and 173 females) were working full-time and 321 (31.4%) people (93 males and 228 females) were working part-time. This compares with 92% of people who were employed in the 1996 Census and 90% of people who were employed in the 1991 Census. 93% of the Australian labour force were employed on census night.

In the 2001 Census, 39 people were unemployed, representing 3.7% of the labour force. In the 1996 Census, there were 93 (8.4%) unemployed people and 115 (9.7%) unemployed people in the 1991 Census. 7.4% of the Australian labour force were unemployed on census night.

In the 2001 Census, 274 (26.8%) people were employed as Managers and Administrators. There were 102 (10.0%) people employed as Associate Professionals and there were 101 (9.9%) people employed as Intermediate Clerical, Sales and Service Workers. Across Australia 9% of people were employed as Managers and Administrators; 12% as Associate Professionals and 17% as Intermediate Clerical, Sales and Service Workers.

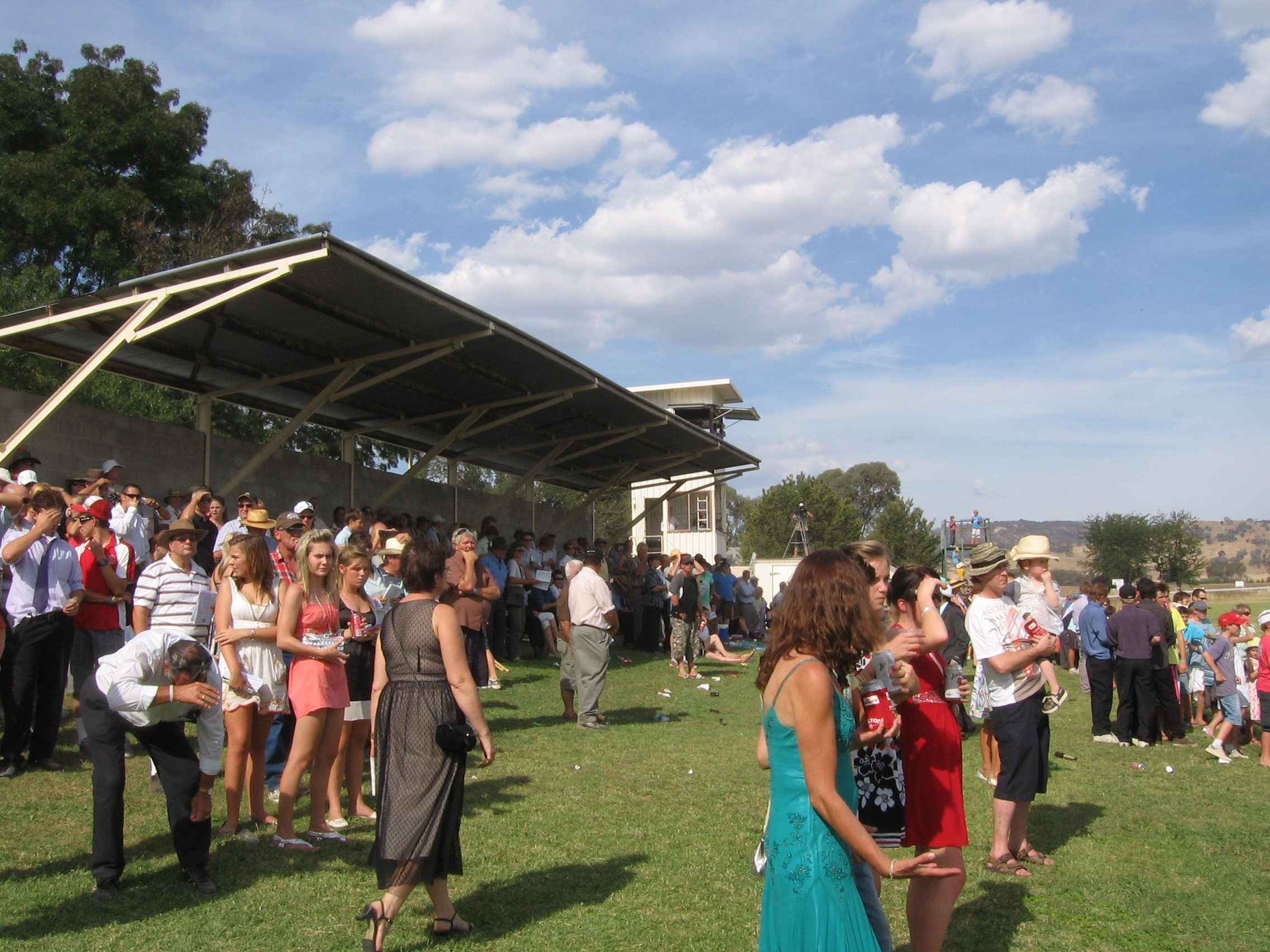
The Holbrook Cup race meeting

In the 2001 Census, 95 (9.2%) people were employed in the Manufacturing industry, which compares with 3.6% of people in the 1996 Census and 5.6% of people in the 1991 Census. There were 126 (12.2%) people employed in the Retail Trade industry and there were 30 (2.9%) people (0 males and 30 females) employed in the Education industry. Across Australia 12% were employed in the Manufacturing industry, 15% in the Retail Trade industry and 7% in the Education industry. A softwood timber mill opened in 1998 which has subsequently closed.

The median weekly individual income for people aged 15 years and over in the 2001 Census was $300–$399. This was the same as for Australia.

In the 2001 Census, there were 291 couple families with children (which comprised 44.7% of all families in occupied private dwellings), 283 couple families without children (43.5%), 70 one parent families (10.8%) and 7 other families (1.1%). There were 42 people (1.9%) in group households and 238 people (10.7%) in lone person households in the 2001 Census. Across Australia 47% of all families in occupied private dwellings were couple families with children, 36% couple families without children, 16% one parent families and 2% other families. There were 3% of people in group households and 9% in lone person households.

In the 2001 Census, there were 865 separate houses (92.7%), 37 flats, units or apartments (4.0%) and 31 other dwellings (3.3%). Of all occupied private dwellings in the 2001 Census, 670 were either fully owned or being purchased, which represents (71.6%) of all occupied private dwellings, while 177 (18.9%) were being rented. 75% of Australian dwellings are separate houses and 66% of all Australian dwellings were either fully owned or being purchased.

== Climate ==
Climate data for Holbrook(Lat: 35.72° SLon: 147.31° E) (precipitation normals 2000-2024)
Month	Jan	Feb	Mar	Apr	May	Jun	Jul	Aug	Sep	Oct	Nov	Dec	Year
Average precipitation mm (inches)	56.8 (2.24)	55.8 (2.20)	58.6 (2.31)	42.4 (1.67)	48.4 (1.91)	65.5 (2.58)	61.1 (2.41)	65.5 (2.58)	59.3 (2.33)	56.5 (2.22)	70.2 (2.76)	46.0 (1.81)	686.1 (27.02)
Source: Bureau of Meteorology

== Notable persons ==
- Charlie Armstrong (1883–1954), retired Australian rules footballer
- Noel Barnett (1908–2000), Australian rules footballer
- Richard Bull (b. 1946), grazier and former State politician
- Sophie Casey (b. 1991), Australian rules footballer
- Anne Clyde (1946–2005), Australian educator, teacher-librarian, author
- Allan Ewing (b. 1951), retired Australian Anglican bishop who served in Holbrook
- Alfred Geary (1849–1911), cricketer
- James Gormly (1836–1922), State politician
- Jim King (1873–1929), retired Australian rules footballer
- Jack Loes (1910–1982), retired Australian rules footballer
- Gordon McLaurin (1862–1917), State politician (son of James)
- James McLaurin (1821–1891), State politician
- John Meredith (1920–2001), part of the Australian folk music revival of the 1950s
- Daniel Morgan (1830–1865), bushranger who passed through the town in 1864
- Alyce Parker (b. 2000), Australian rules footballer
- Henry Playfair (b. 1983), retired Australian rules footballer
- Bruce Quick ( b 1959)(Olympic Shooter), Australian Olympian and Commonwealth games shooter
- Ellis Stones (1895–1975)), Australian landscape architect of private and public gardens, including 'Kildrummie', the town's Carnegie garden
- George Withers (1917–1991), Australian rules footballer

== See also ==
- Australian place names changed from German names
