= Coppabella Blacksmith Shop =

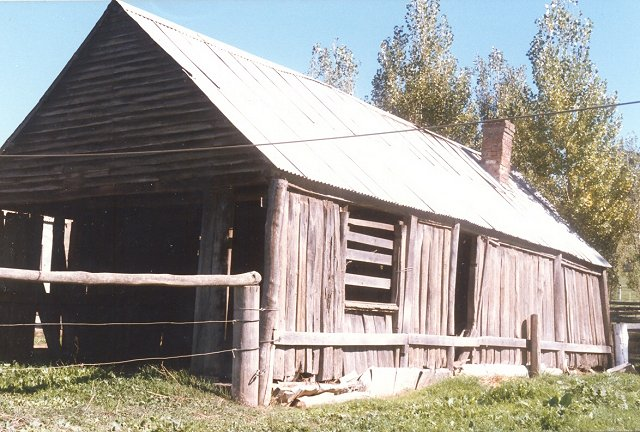

- Location within New South Wales Location within Australia
- 35.7436°S 147.7254°E
- Location: Rosewood, Greater Hume Shire, New South Wales, Australia

History
- Built: 1863–1863

New South Wales Heritage Register
- Official name: Coppabella Blacksmith Shop, Stables and Burial Plot; Coppabella Station; Coppit Billy
- Type: state heritage (complex / group)
- Designated: 2 April 1999
- Reference no.: 620
- Type: Blacksmithy
- Category: Manufacturing and Processing

Coppabella Blacksmith Shop is a heritage-listed former blacksmith shop on the former Coppabella Station at Rosewood in the Riverina region of New South Wales, Australia. It was built c. 1863. The site includes an adjacent stables and burial plot. It was added to the New South Wales State Heritage Register on 2 April 1999.

== History ==
The land was granted to Henry Osborne in 1837. The following year Osborne sold the property to James Robinson who was Osborne's neighbour in the Illawarra region. Robinson was subsequently the first to settle in the Tumbarumba region.

Robinson and his wife raised eight daughters and one son. The son later managed the property after Robinsons death in 1868. Most of the daughters married locally and due to the large family, Coppabella was the district's social centre for many years.

In 1872 the property was subdivided and the main portion sold to Henry Whitty, a nephew of Robinson jnr.

In 1876 Whitty sold to the Rial brothers. However, later, the property was resumed by the Bank of Australasia. The history of the property ownership is not known until 1920 when Mr Baker sold Coppabella to Tupra Pastoral Company, owned by the Creswick family of Melbourne. Upon the death of Sir Alex Creswick, they sold the property to Australian Newsprint Mills in 1983.

In 1985 the Heritage Branch received community representations concerned for the future of the site as it was for sale. At the time the timber industry was replacing much of the traditional agricultural practices in the region. There was a possibility that the site would be cleared and used for pine plantation.

A s.130 order was placed over the site on 2 August 1985 to provide emergency protection of the site. Following discussion with the owner of the site, Australian Newsprint Mills Pty Ltd conservation under the Heritage Act 1977 as supported and Interim Heritage Order was placed on 5 December 1986.

In 1987 Australian Newsprint Mills commissioned an archaeology report to assess the structures and recommend a schedule of works. During 1988 and 1989 conservation works were completed on the site.

A Permanent Conservation Order was placed over the site on 2 December 1988. It was transferred to the State Heritage Register on 2 April 1999.

== Description ==
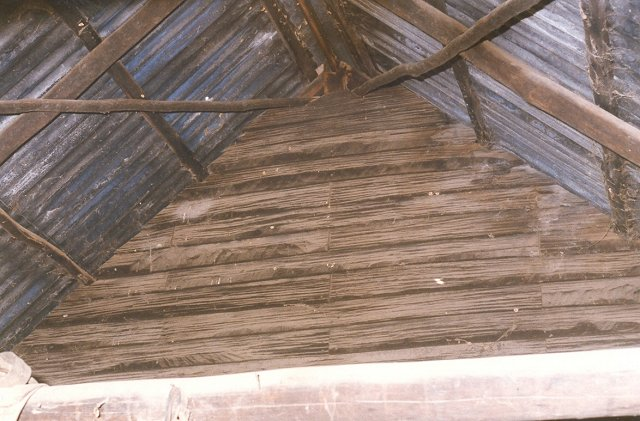
Construction of the roof

Coppabella is located on McGuinnity's Gap Road and Coppabella Road, Rosewood, approximately 50 km east of Holbrook near Tumbarumba in the Snowy Mountains. The site consists of a blacksmith workshop, stable and family burial plot at Coppabella Station.

The blacksmith's workshop is a rectangular, timber structure. The walls are constructed of split slabs, let into the top plate and rest between battens fixed by wire drawn nails on the bottom plate. All the original plates are axe dressed. The top plates are fixed by iron spikes to a series of axe dressed perimeter posts set in the ground. The roof is corrugated galvanised iron, attached to the original stringy bark sapling farm. The gable ends are hand split weatherboards the floor is earth throughout. The brick chimney extends through the roof.

The sulky horses were shod in the main room while the draft horses, weather permitting, were shod in the yard which separates the blacksmith's from the stables. Water was piped from a reservoir sited on the hill to the west of the blacksmiths. The water ran into a wooden keg which was then carried to the blacksmiths shop.

Inside rough work benches are installed along the accessible walls and the forge itself stands close to the north wall. There is a large bellows labelled "JOHN C. ONIONS, BRADFORD STREET, BIRMINGHAM, PATENTEE NO. 26855." The bellows is complete with its water jacket around the nozzle. The forge area as a whole is very complete with layers of wheels, horseshoes and farriers' tools, representing perhaps a century of accumulation. The tools are outstanding in terms of their authenticity and variety some being hand made, displaying a good standard of the Smith's art.

The Stables, originally a weatherboard structure has been partially reclad with galvanised iron sheeting. It is timber framed with an impressive central aisle of timber posts. The aisle is flagged with stone and lined with half height doors, swung on forged strap hinges. The stalls are separated by vertical slab partitions. The ceiling and corresponding floor of the hayloft, is bark, supported on poles.

To the north-east of the blacksmithy and stable is the Robinson family plot. There are three graves with two remaining headstones made from local granite enclosed by a railed fence and shaded by elm trees. The graves belong to James Robinson who died in 1878 and James Dawling Robinson who died in 1868. Adjacent to the graves are a number of exotic trees which were planted along the original driveway to the property.

== Heritage listing ==
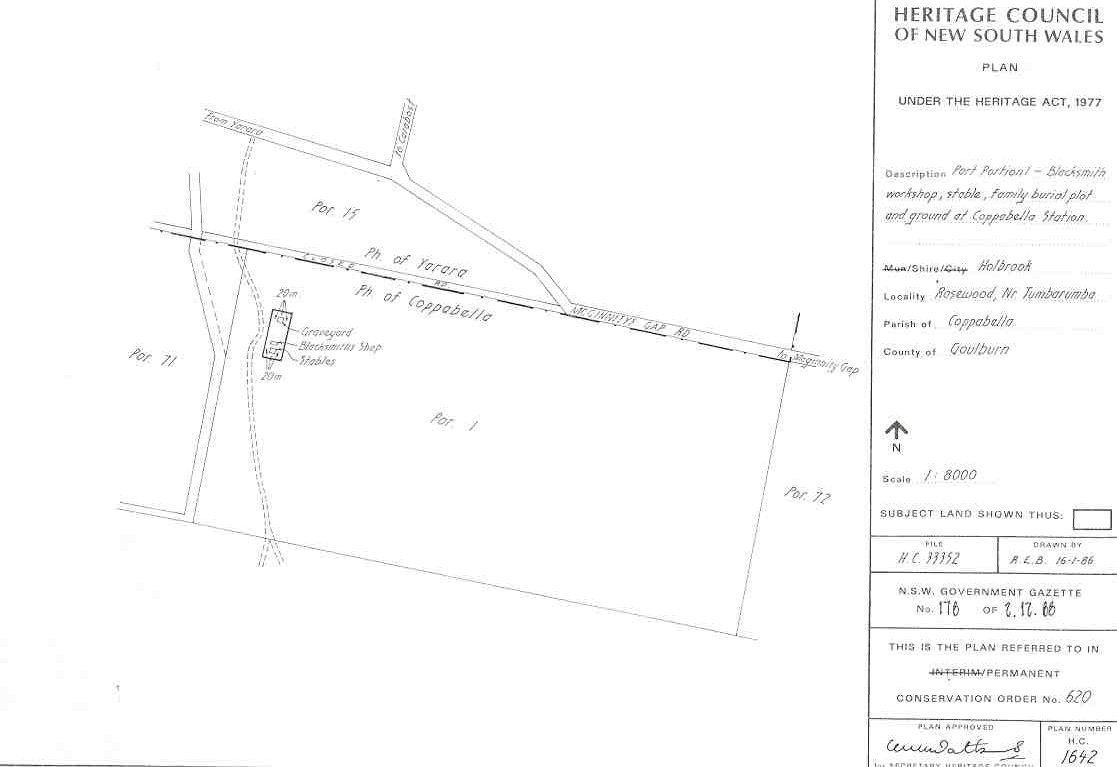
Heritage boundaries

Coppabella Station is of State heritage significance as the first station in the Tumbarumba region and one that played a central role in the society of the region. The blacksmiths shop, stables and graves date to this initial period of occupation and display traditional and now rare building construction techniques - based on hand hewn timbers, bark and corrugated iron. Constructed c. 1863 the blacksmith workshop, stable and graves are substantially intact and have not been significantly altered since construction.

Coppabella Blacksmith Shop was listed on the New South Wales State Heritage Register on 2 April 1999.
