= Loes =

Loes may refer to:

== Places ==
- Loes Hundred, a Suffolk county division
- Loes River, a river in East Timor

== Given name ==
A Dutch feminine given name (pronounced /lus/), a short form of Louise. People with the name include:

- Loes Geurts (born 1986), Dutch footballer
- Loes Gunnewijk (born 1980), Dutch racing cyclist
- Loes Haverkort (born 1981), Dutch actress
- Loes Luca (born 1953), Dutch actress, singer and comedian
- Loes Markerink (born 1985), Dutch racing cyclist
- Loes Schutte (born 1953), Dutch rower
- Loes Sels (born 1985), Belgian cyclo-cross cyclist
- Loes Ypma (born 1980), Dutch Labour Party politician

== Surname ==
- Billy Loes (1929–2010), American baseball pitcher
- Harry Dixon Loes (1892–1965), American hymn writer
- Jack Loes (1910–1982), Australian rules footballer
- Vanessa Lóes (born 1971), Brazilian actress

== See also ==
- Loes., botanical abbreviation for Ludwig Loesener
