= National Museum of Australian Pottery =

Ceramics museum in Australia

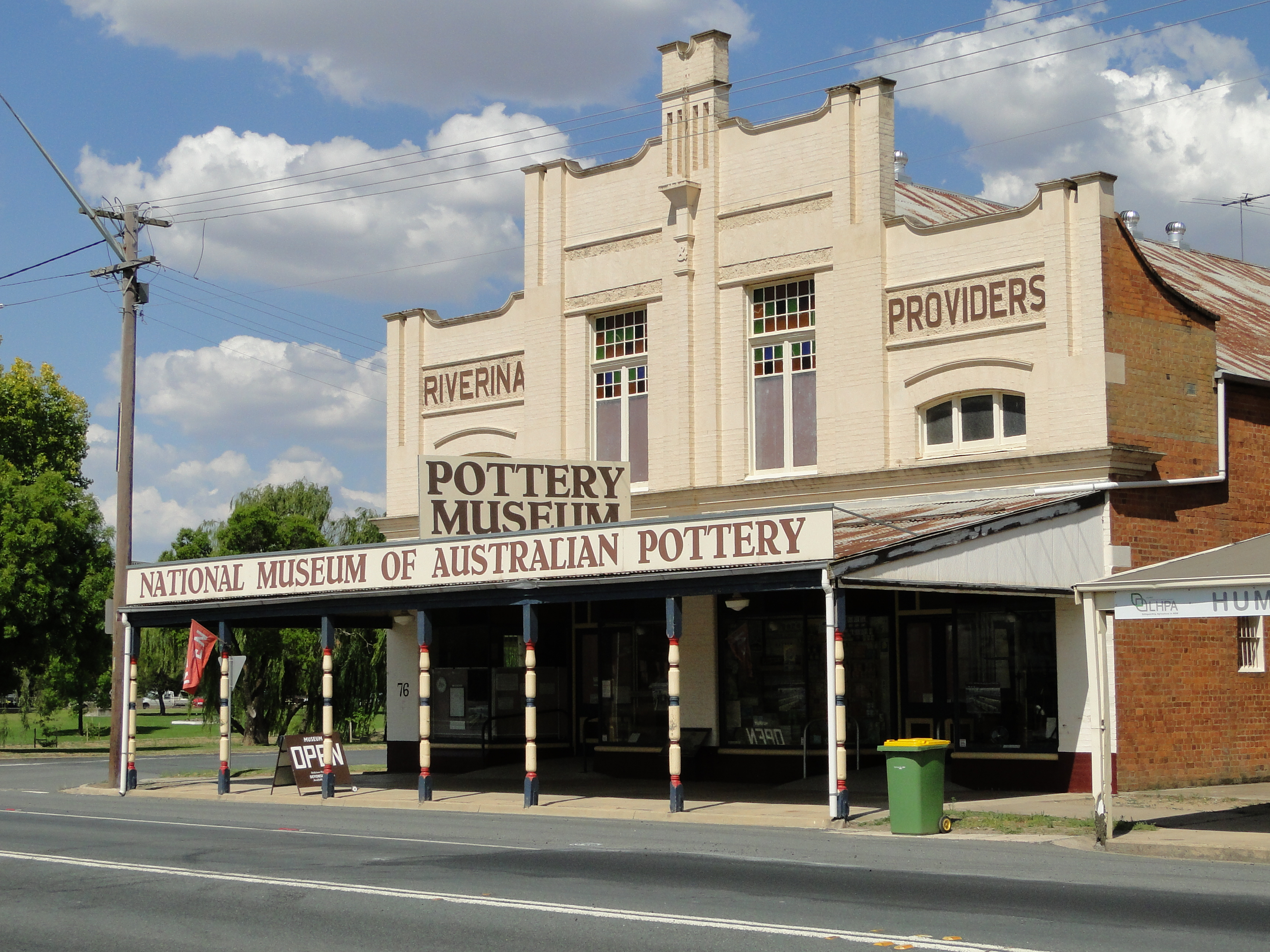
- National Museum of Australian Pottery, Holbrook
- Established: 1995
- Location: Holbrook, New South Wales
- Coordinates: 35.7264°S 147.3124°E
- Website: www.australianpottery.net.au

The National Museum of Australian Pottery is located in the town of Holbrook, New South Wales. It holds over 2000 pieces of domestic Australian pottery made in the 19th and early 20th centuries.

== History ==
The museum opened in Wodonga, Victoria in 1995, and moved to Holbrook in 2006. The museum building was originally a large department store built in 1910 for A. H. Mackie and Company. The owners and directors of the museum are Geoff and Kerrie Ford, and its holdings are known as the Geoff and Kerrie Ford Australian Pottery Collection.

== Collection ==
The collection is devoted to Australian potters and potteries established between 1788 and 1920, together with those that continued operating after 1920 until they closed. Among its more than 2,000 items, such as tea pots, jugs, water filters, spruce and ginger beer bottles, along with a large variety of colourful and decorative pieces. More than 130 Australian potteries are included. The museum also runs an ongoing program of short-term exhibitions.

The museum also includes work by the convict potter, Jonathon Leak (1777-1838). Leak's pieces are the earliest marked pieces of Australian pottery. Leak, a trained Staffordshire potter, was convicted of burglary in 1819. His death sentence was commuted to transportation for life, and after arriving in Sydney in December 1819 he was put to work at the government pottery on Brickfield Hill. Many of the Leak pieces on display were recovered from a clay pit in Sydney during an archaeological dig in 2007.

== Awards ==
The museum's owners and directors, Geoff and Kerrie Ford, have been awarded Order of Australia Medals for "service to the arts, particularly the study of early Australian pottery, and to the community." Ford has written several book on Australian pottery, including Australian Pottery: The first 100 years (1995), the Encyclopaedia of Australian Potter's Marks (1998) and Convict Potters of Australia 1821 to 1851 (2001).
