= Rosewood, New South Wales =

Rosewood
- Town
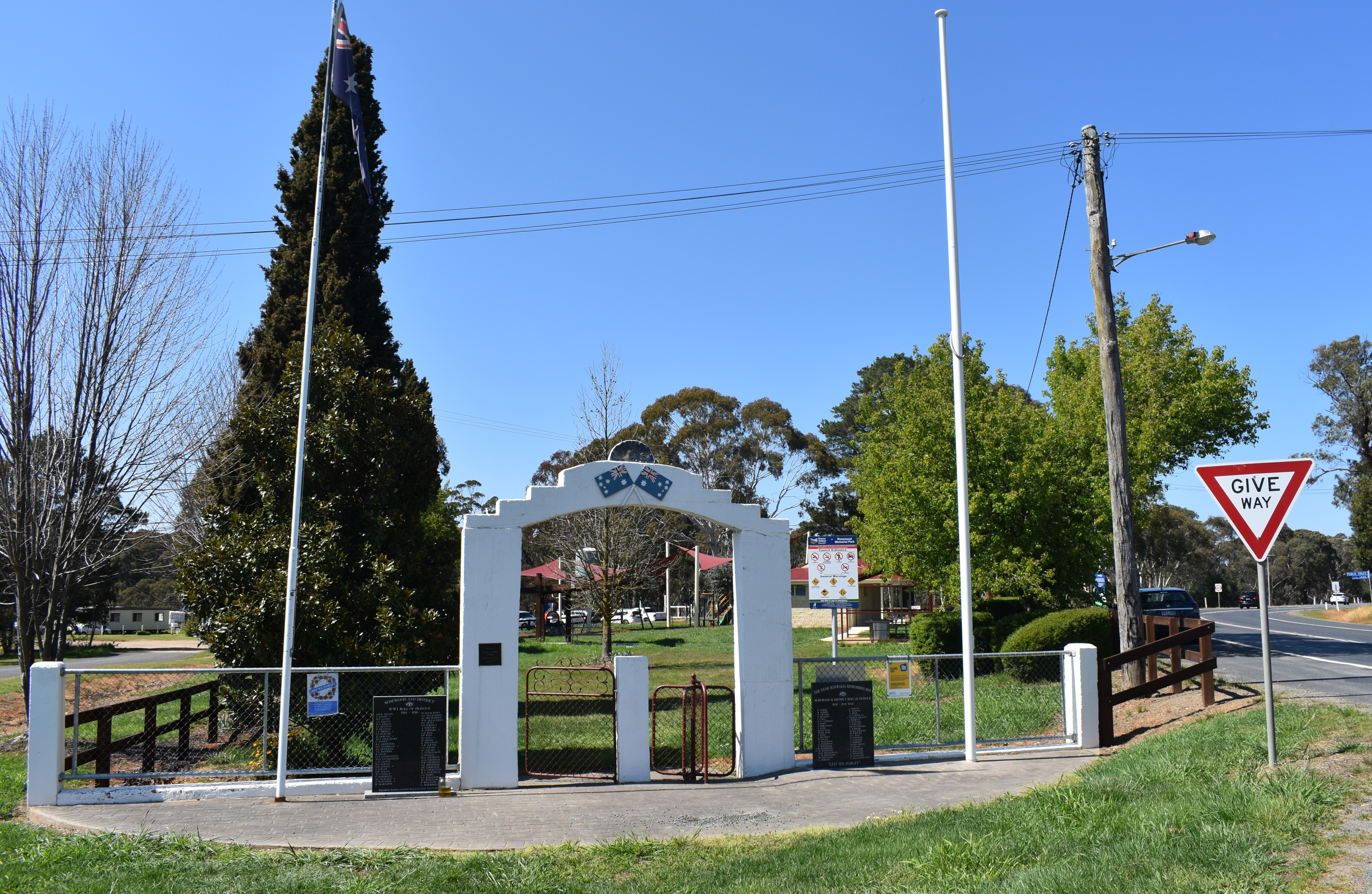
- War memorial at Rosewood, 2020

- Coordinates: 35°40′29″S 147°51′50″E
- Country: Australia
- State: New South Wales
- LGAs: Greater Hume Shire; Snowy Valleys Council
- Location: 16 km (9.9 mi) from Carabost; 19 km (12 mi) from Tumbarumba

Government
  - State electorate: Albury
  - Federal divisions: Riverina; Farrer
- Elevation: 602 m (1,975 ft)

Population
  - Total: 218 (2021 census)
- Postcode: 2652
- County: Selwyn
- Mean max temp: 19.1 °C (66.4 °F)
- Mean min temp: 4.4 °C (39.9 °F)
- Annual rainfall: 906.3 mm (35.68 in)

Rosewood is a village community and locality in the southeast part of the Riverina, New South Wales, Australia. It is situated about 16 kilometres (9.9 mi) southeast from Carabost and 19 kilometres (12 mi) northwest from Tumbarumba. At the 2021 census, Rosewood had a population of 218. The village is administered by two local governments; the northern part of the locality by the Greater Hume Shire and the southern part of the locality by the Snowy Valleys Council. The village of Rosewood is within the Snowy Valleys Council area.

== History ==
Rosewood Post Office opened on 1 August 1885.

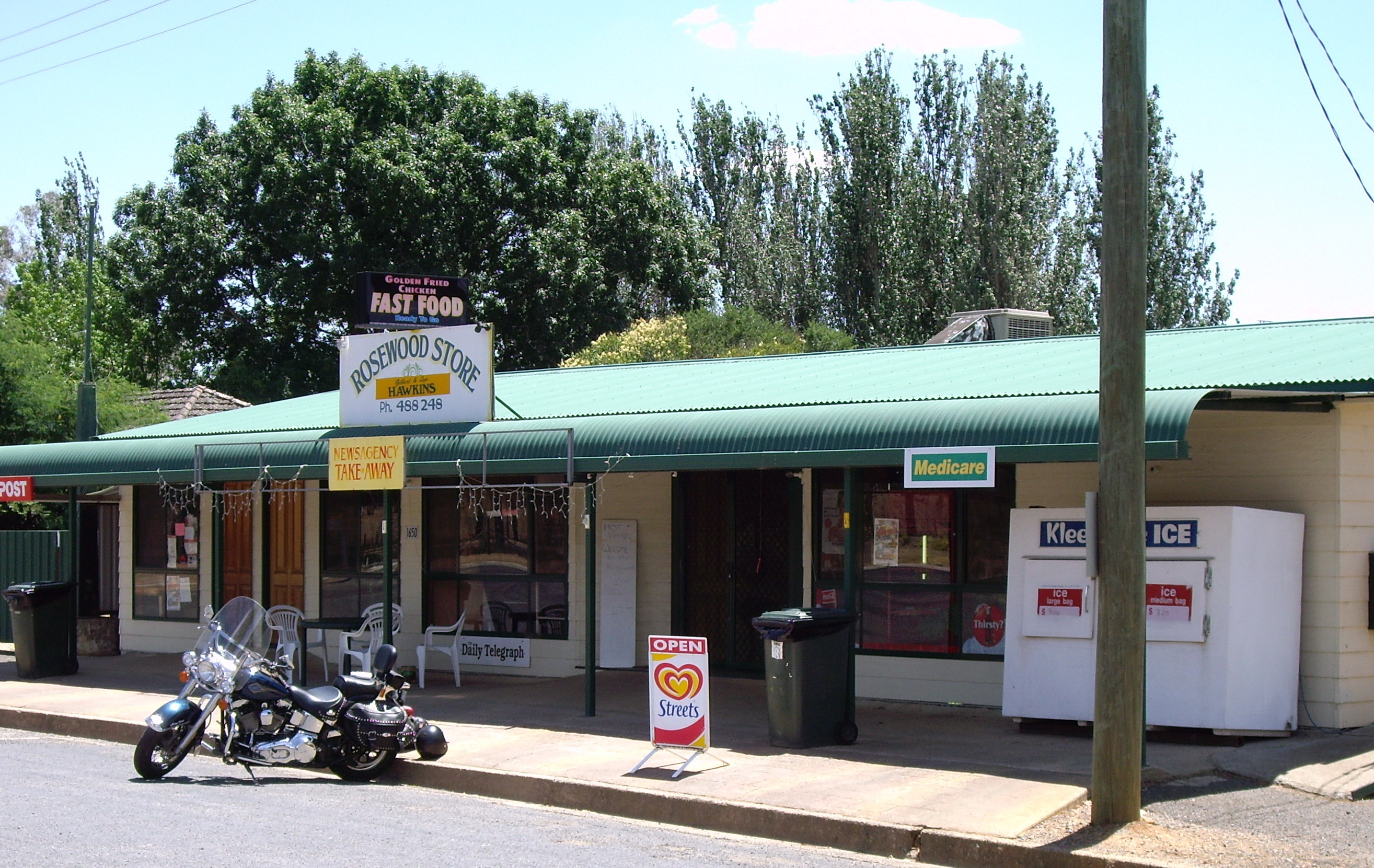
Rosewood General Store and Post Office

== Heritage listings ==
Rosewood has a number of heritage-listed sites, including:

Coppabella Blacksmith Shop

Elm Cottage - 1730 Tumbarumba Rd. Est. c. 1885. Built from locally sourced stone.

== Tumbarumba to Rosewood Rail Trail ==
Rosewood is currently at the furthest extent of a 21 km long rail trail from Tumbarumba, which reuses a portion of the route of the former Tumbarumba railway line. It opened on 3 April 2020. The remainder of the old railway, between Rosewood and Wagga Wagga, has not been used since in 1987, but largely remains in place, in a degraded state, although some sections of track have been removed. The rail trail has been described as a 'pilot', indicating that a future extension, beyond Rosewood, is possible.

== Climate ==
Owing to its location on the boundary zone between the South West Slopes and the Riverina plain (in pine plantation country), Rosewood features cool maxima relative to its altitude: its annual mean maximum lay at 19.1 °C (66.4 °F), comparable to that of Cooma on the eastern side of the ranges, despite being over 300 metres (980 ft) lower in altitude. Maxima are especially cool in the winter.

Climate data for Brookfield Forest Station (1938–1968); 457 m AMSL; 35.80° S, 147.93° E
Month	Jan	Feb	Mar	Apr	May	Jun	Jul	Aug	Sep	Oct	Nov	Dec	Year
Mean daily maximum °C (°F)	28.7 (83.7)	27.7 (81.9)	24.8 (76.6)	19.1 (66.4)	14.5 (58.1)	10.9 (51.6)	9.9 (49.8)	11.8 (53.2)	15.6 (60.1)	18.6 (65.5)	21.8 (71.2)	26.0 (78.8)	19.1 (66.4)
Mean daily minimum °C (°F)	10.1 (50.2)	10.1 (50.2)	7.5 (45.5)	3.9 (39.0)	1.4 (34.5)	0.2 (32.4)	−0.8 (30.6)	0.3 (32.5)	1.7 (35.1)	4.0 (39.2)	6.0 (42.8)	7.9 (46.2)	4.4 (39.9)
Average precipitation mm (inches)	56.0 (2.20)	47.2 (1.86)	65.5 (2.58)	65.6 (2.58)	86.2 (3.39)	82.3 (3.24)	99.0 (3.90)	92.3 (3.63)	81.6 (3.21)	98.7 (3.89)	70.8 (2.79)	60.1 (2.37)	906.3 (35.68)
Average precipitation days (≥ 0.2 mm)	6.0	5.6	6.3	8.0	10.8	12.7	13.9	14.5	10.7	11.9	8.5	7.3	116.2
Source: Australian Bureau of Meteorology; Brookfield Forest Station
