= George Withers (footballer) =

Australian rules footballer, born 1917

Personal information
- Full name: George David Withers
- Born: 7 March 1917; Holbrook, New South Wales
- Died: 15 April 1991 (aged 74)
- Original team: Prahran / Culcairn
- Height: 179 cm (5 ft 10 in)
- Weight: 79 kg (174 lb)

Playing career^{1}
Years	Club	Games (Goals)
1943	Hawthorn	2 (0)
- ^{1} Playing statistics correct to the end of 1943.

George David Withers (7 March 1917 – 15 April 1991) was an Australian rules footballer who played with Hawthorn in the Victorian Football League (VFL).
