= Alfred Geary =

Australian cricketer

Personal information
- Born: 8 August 1849; Holbrook, New South Wales, Australia
- Died: 14 October 1911 (aged 62); Brisbane, Australia
- Source: ESPNcricinfo, 28 December 2016

Alfred Geary (8 August 1849 – 14 October 1911) was an Australian cricketer. He played five first-class matches for New South Wales between 1877 and 1883. He was also stipendiary steward of the Queensland Turf Club.

== See also ==
- List of New South Wales representative cricketers
