= Carbost =

Carbost (Gaelic: Càrrabost) is the name of several settlements:

- Carbost, Loch Harport, Isle of Skye, in Highland, Scotland
- Carbost, Trotternish, near Portree, Isle of Skye, in Highland, Scotland
- Carabost, New South Wales, Australia
