= Anne Clyde =

Australian educator and librarian

Doctor Anne Clyde
- Born: Laurel Anne Clyde; 7 February 1946; Holbrook, New South Wales
- Died: 18 September 2005 (aged 59)

Academic background
- Education: James Cook University
- Thesis: The magic casements: a survey of school library history from the eighth to the twentieth century (1981)

Laurel Anne Clyde (7 February 1946 – 18 September 2005) was an Australian educator, teacher-librarian, author and academic who taught in colleges and universities in Australia and Canada, as well as in Iceland. She was known for her expertise in electronic resources and the Internet. Anne was also influential in the early adoption and evaluation of internet sites and online tools by teacher librarians.

== Early life and education ==
Laurel Anne Clyde (known as Anne) was born in Holbrook, New South Wales on 7 February 1946.

In 1981 she earned a PhD from James Cook University, Queensland.

== Career ==
Clyde began her career as a teacher and librarian at the New South Wales Department of Education from 1967 to 1973.

In Australia, Clyde held academic positions in three states, as lecturer in school librarianship at Townsville College of Advanced Education (now part of the James Cook University of North Queensland); as lecturer in librarianship at Charles Sturt University, Wagga Wagga; and as senior lecturer and head of the Department of Library and Information Studies, as it then was, at Edith Cowan University.

In 1990 she accepted an appointment as a visiting faculty member at the University of Iceland for a year, then in 1991 moved to the University of British Columbia in Canada as associate professor with responsibility for teacher librarianship programmes. After two years in Canada, she returned to Iceland. She was also visiting scholar at the Graduate School of Management at the University of Western Australia in 1996 and 1999 and consulted in Latin America, Botswana and Namibia. Anne wrote a regular column on InfoTech for the North American journal Teacher librarian and was the webmaster for the International Association of School Librarianship (IASL) from 1995 to her death in September 2005. She introduced many teacher librarians around the world to emerging online resources through the "site of the week".

From May 2003, Clyde held the position of chair of the Standing Section for School Libraries and Resource Centres for the International Federation of Library Associations (IFLA).

=== Research interests ===
Clyde's doctorate in 1981 from James Cook University was a survey of the history of school libraries.

Her research interests included the use of the Internet and online information services in a range of library and educational settings, investigating the ways in which they are understood and measured. She also studied the characteristics of research and researchers in the field of school librarianship. She wrote many scholarly papers, presentations and articles on social networking, including Weblogs and Libraries, which was the first scholarly work on the topic.

== Works ==
- Clyde, Laurel A. (Laurel Anne); Joyce, D. Joan; Riverina College of Advanced Education. Centre for Library Studies (1983), Computers and school libraries : an annotated bibliography, Centre for Library Studies, Riverina College of Advanced Education, ISBN 978-0-909561-30-7
- Clyde, Laurel A. (Laurel Anne) (1989), Computer software for school libraries : a directory (2nd ed.), Auslib Press, ISBN 978-1-875145-01-0
- Clyde, Laurel A. (Laurel Anne) (1993), Computer applications in libraries : a directory of systems & software, ALIA/Thorpe, ISBN 978-1-875589-33-3
- Lobban, Marjorie; Clyde, Laurel A. (Laurel Anne); Australian Library and Information Association (1996), Out of the closet and into the classroom : homosexuality in books for young people (2nd ed.), ALIA/Thorpe, ISBN 978-1-875589-86-9
- Clyde, Laurel A. (Laurel Anne) (1997). School libraries and the electronic community: the Internet connection. Lanham, Md: Scarecrow Press. ISBN 0810831937.
- Clyde, Laurel A. (Laurel Anne) (1999). Managing infotech in school library media centers. Englewood, Colo: Libraries Unlimited. ISBN 1563087243.
- Clyde, Laurel A. (Laurel Anne) (2004), Weblogs and libraries, Chandos Publishing, ISBN 978-1-84334-096-6

== Death ==
Anne suffered a fatal cardiac tamponade in Reykjavík, Iceland, on 18 September 2005. A memorial service was held on 18 October 2005 at St George's Cathedral in Perth, Western Australia, and her ashes were scattered at Þingvellir on the site of the first Icelandic Parliament.

== Memorials ==
- The Dr. Laurel Anne Clyde Memorial Keynote Address at the Australian School Library Association(ASLA) Biennial Conference
- The Australian Library and Information Association, Academic and Research Libraries group in Western Australia maintains the Ann Clyde Memorial Prize in her memory.
- The International Association of School Librarianship (IASL) developed the Dr Anne Clyde Research Memorial Fund for research and development in the field of school librarianship.
