= Jack Loes =

Australian rules footballer, born 1910

Personal information
- Full name: John Henry Loes
- Born: 18 June 1910; Tumbarumba, New South Wales
- Died: 28 July 1982 (aged 72); Holbrook, New South Wales
- Original team: Holbrook

Playing career^{1}
Years	Club	Games (Goals)
1932	St Kilda	4 (0)
- ^{1} Playing statistics correct to the end of 1932.

John Henry Loes (18 June 1910 – 28 July 1982) was an Australian rules footballer who played with St Kilda in the Victorian Football League (VFL).
