= Tumbarumba =

- Town
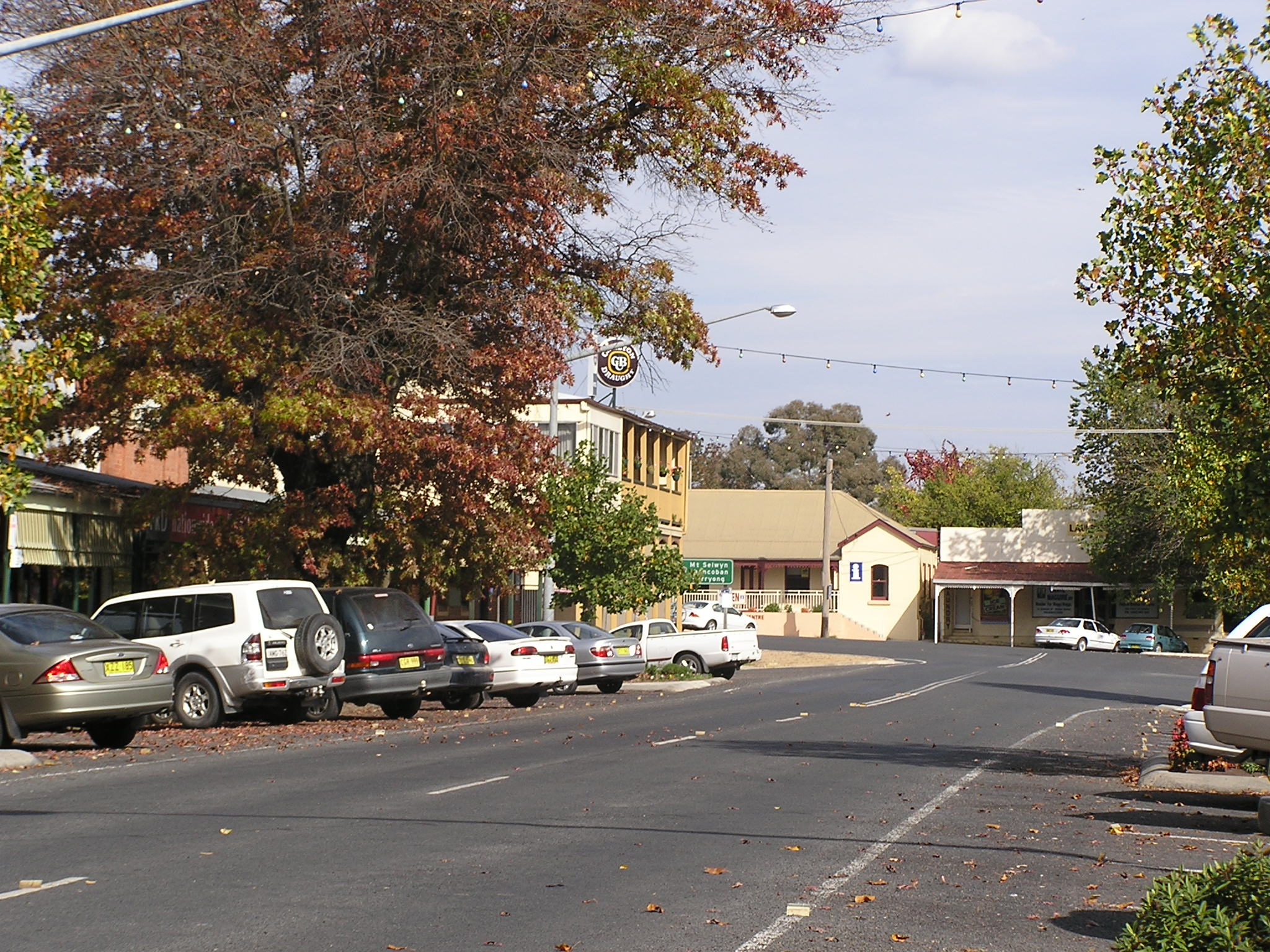
- The Parade, Main street of Tumbarumba

- Coordinates: 35°47′0″S 148°01′0″E
- Country: Australia
- State: New South Wales
- LGA: Snowy Valleys Council
- Location: 480 km (300 mi) SW of Sydney; 477 km (296 mi) NE of Melbourne; 114 km (71 mi) SE of Wagga Wagga; 137 km (85 mi) ENE of Albury; 65 km (40 mi) SSW of Tumut
- Established: 1850s

Government
  - State electorate: Albury
  - Federal division: Riverina
- Elevation: 645 m (2,116 ft)

Population
  - Total: 1,862 (2016 census)
- Postcode: 2653
- County: Selwyn
- Mean max temp: 19.8 °C (67.6 °F)
- Mean min temp: 5.6 °C (42.1 °F)
- Annual rainfall: 979.0 mm (38.54 in)

Tumbarumba (/tʌmbəˈrʌmbə/ tum-bə-RUM-bə) is a town in New South Wales, Australia, about 480 kilometres (300 mi) southwest of the state capital, Sydney. Tumbarumba is located in the South West Slopes region at the western edge of the Snowy Mountains. The 2016 census showed the population of the town and surrounding area to be 1,862 people. Locals refer to the town as 'Tumba'.

To the south and east, the highest peak of the Snowy Mountains and mainland Australia—Mount Kosciuszko—can be seen.

== History ==
The Aboriginal history of the region is contentious. According to the map developed by Tindale, the area that is now Tumbarumba lay at the boundary of the lands of the Wiradjuri and Walgalu peoples. Since the Wiradjuri word for the 'Walgalu' was Guramal, meaning 'hostile men', presumably there was little in common between these peoples, who spoke different languages. The Walgulu spoke the same Ngarigo language as the more easterly Ngarigo people of the Monaro region, and in more recent times these groups have been considered by some to be just one people, the Ngarigo, whose lands included Tumbarumba. There are different views on the origin on the word 'tumbarumba' and whether it derives from the Wirajuri or Ngarigo language. Tumbarumba and surrounds now lie within the Brungle/Tumut Aboriginal Land Council Area.

The settler community was established in the late 1850s after gold was discovered in the district. The Post Office opened on 1 August 1860 but was spelt Tumberumba until 1915.

A railway branch line was opened to Tumbarumba in 1921. The Tumbarumba railway line ran from Wagga Wagga through Tarcutta. The service ceased in September 1974 and the line has since been officially closed. The 21 km final section of the line between Rosewood and Tumbarumba opened as the first rail trail in NSW in April 2020.

Gold mining petered out in the 1930s, and the region's economy now depends on agriculture and tourism. The timber industry dominates the Shire's economy.

The name Tumbarumba may be derived from the sound of thunder. or alternatively from the Aboriginal words for "hollow sounding ground", "thunder", "sound" or "place of big trees".

== Industry ==
The major industry in the town is softwood timber processing, with the Hyne and Sons Timber Mill to the west of the town being the biggest employer. Other industries include tourism, viticulture (Tumbarumba is in the Tumbarumba wine region), and blueberry growing. Tourism is a source of income due to its proximity to the snow fields.

== Climate ==
Tumbarumba has a temperate oceanic climate (Cfb), with a great seasonal range in maximum temperatures and a pronounced winter rainfall peak. Frosts are frequent throughout much of the year. Snow is fairly common, generally falling on about two days per annum, though is usually light due to the town's valley location. The lowest recorded temperature was −9.4 °C (15.1 °F) on 13 July 1970, and the lowest maximum temperature was 1.1 °C (34.0 °F) on 15 July 1966. The town gets 109.2 clear days annually, with the grand majority in summer and early autumn. The winters are often cloudy and damp.

Rainfall records commenced at Tumbarumba Post Office in 1885, however temperature records (both averages and extremes) didn't commence until 1965.

Climate data for Tumbarumba Post Office (1965–2025, rainfall to 1885); 645 m AMSL; 35.78° S, 148.01° E
Month	Jan	Feb	Mar	Apr	May	Jun	Jul	Aug	Sep	Oct	Nov	Dec	Year
Record high °C (°F)	42.0 (107.6)	40.5 (104.9)	35.6 (96.1)	32.5 (90.5)	24.0 (75.2)	19.2 (66.6)	20.0 (68.0)	22.0 (71.6)	27.8 (82.0)	31.5 (88.7)	36.6 (97.9)	39.0 (102.2)	42.0 (107.6)
Mean daily maximum °C (°F)	29.1 (84.4)	28.5 (83.3)	25.3 (77.5)	20.2 (68.4)	15.3 (59.5)	11.9 (53.4)	10.8 (51.4)	12.4 (54.3)	15.6 (60.1)	19.7 (67.5)	23.0 (73.4)	26.3 (79.3)	19.8 (67.7)
Mean daily minimum °C (°F)	12.4 (54.3)	12.1 (53.8)	9.0 (48.2)	5.1 (41.2)	2.3 (36.1)	0.3 (32.5)	−0.1 (31.8)	0.9 (33.6)	3.1 (37.6)	5.3 (41.5)	7.9 (46.2)	9.9 (49.8)	5.7 (42.2)
Record low °C (°F)	1.6 (34.9)	1.9 (35.4)	−1.3 (29.7)	−4.1 (24.6)	−6.7 (19.9)	−8.0 (17.6)	−9.4 (15.1)	−8.1 (17.4)	−5.0 (23.0)	−5.5 (22.1)	−3.9 (25.0)	0.1 (32.2)	−9.4 (15.1)
Average precipitation mm (inches)	64.7 (2.55)	54.7 (2.15)	65.9 (2.59)	65.7 (2.59)	82.1 (3.23)	101.8 (4.01)	103.5 (4.07)	105.9 (4.17)	90.1 (3.55)	94.9 (3.74)	77.3 (3.04)	71.5 (2.81)	978.1 (38.51)
Average precipitation days (≥ 0.2 mm)	6.2	5.7	6.5	7.4	9.6	12.4	13.5	13.5	11.4	10.3	8.3	7.3	112.1
Average afternoon relative humidity (%)	38	40	42	50	61	68	67	62	57	49	48	43	52
Source: Australian Bureau of Meteorology

Another site approximately 25 kilometres (16 mi) to the north-west of Tumbarumba operated from 1938 to 1997, at the Carabost Forest Headquarters. There is a remarkable warming trend to be observed between the two sites; particularly in the winter months, where Tumbarumba Post Office averages 10.8 °C (51.4 °F) in July maxima, compared to just 9.1 °C (48.4 °F) at Carabost. This site was at a somewhat lower altitude than Tumbarumba Post Office: a deficit of 65 metres (213 ft).

Climate data for Carabost Forest Headquarters (1938–1969, rainfall 1938–1997); 580 m AMSL; 35.65° S, 147.80° E
Month	Jan	Feb	Mar	Apr	May	Jun	Jul	Aug	Sep	Oct	Nov	Dec	Year
Mean daily maximum °C (°F)	28.0 (82.4)	27.2 (81.0)	24.1 (75.4)	18.7 (65.7)	13.7 (56.7)	10.8 (51.4)	9.1 (48.4)	10.8 (51.4)	14.3 (57.7)	18.0 (64.4)	21.1 (70.0)	25.4 (77.7)	18.4 (65.2)
Mean daily minimum °C (°F)	11.0 (51.8)	11.2 (52.2)	9.0 (48.2)	5.6 (42.1)	3.2 (37.8)	1.7 (35.1)	0.2 (32.4)	1.7 (35.1)	3.2 (37.8)	5.5 (41.9)	7.0 (44.6)	9.0 (48.2)	5.7 (42.3)
Average precipitation mm (inches)	56.4 (2.22)	48.6 (1.91)	61.2 (2.41)	72.6 (2.86)	96.4 (3.80)	92.8 (3.65)	112.5 (4.43)	107.6 (4.24)	84.4 (3.32)	100.1 (3.94)	70.5 (2.78)	60.1 (2.37)	966.5 (38.05)
Average precipitation days (≥ 0.2 mm)	5.1	4.7	5.4	7.0	9.7	10.7	12.6	13.0	10.1	10.1	7.8	6.2	102.4
Source: Australian Bureau of Meteorology; Carabost Forest Headquarters

== Sport ==
The Tumbarumba Greens field rugby league teams in the Murray Cup competition. The club is notable for having a full team of Goldspinks playing in the 1960s. The club formerly competed in the Group 13 Rugby League and Group 9 Rugby League competitions before joining their current league.

The Tumbarumba Kangaroos Australian rules football club, founded in 1969, competes in the Victorian-based Upper Murray Football League.

== Cultural references ==
- In November 1963, New Zealander Johnny Devlin (with Bee Gees on backing vocals) released the single "Stomp The Tumbarumba", a song covered later by, among others, the Australian rock band Hoodoo Gurus (see "Come Anytime" and "1000 Miles Away"). Tumbarumba in the song's title may or may not have something to do with the name of the town.
- Tumbarumba is one of the very few Australian placenames mentioned in James Joyce's prose-poem Finnegans Wake. 'Tumbarumba mountain' is listed as one of the places of origin of HCE (Humphrey Chimpden Earwicker), one of the central characters of the Wake (FW 596.11).
- Shirley Abicair, the UK based Australian singer, made the town of Tumbarumba's name familiar to many British children with the publication of her book "Tales of Tumbarumba" in 1962.
- Tumbarumba is another word for a tmesis, a linguistic term which refers to the placing of a word within another word, such as "ri-goddamn-diculous". The origin of this meaning may come from the poem "Tumba-bloody-rumba" by John O'Grady, which includes several tmeses including "Tumba-bloody-rumba", "e-bloody-nough", and "kanga-bloody-roos".

== Notable people ==
- Jack Blomley – Rugby union Wallabies player
- Jack Loes – Australian rules footballer
- John Williams – scientist

== Gallery ==
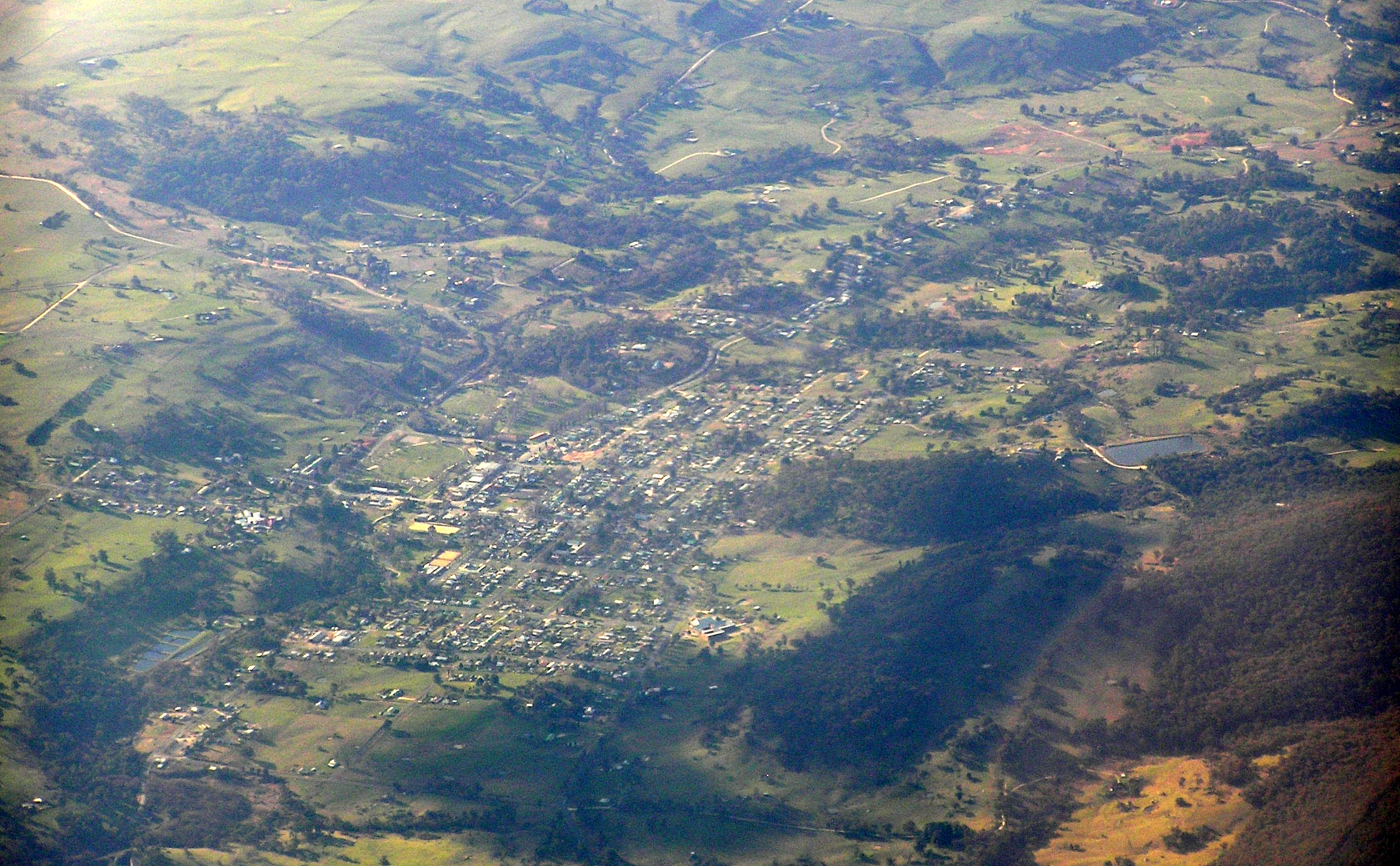
Aerial view from the southeast

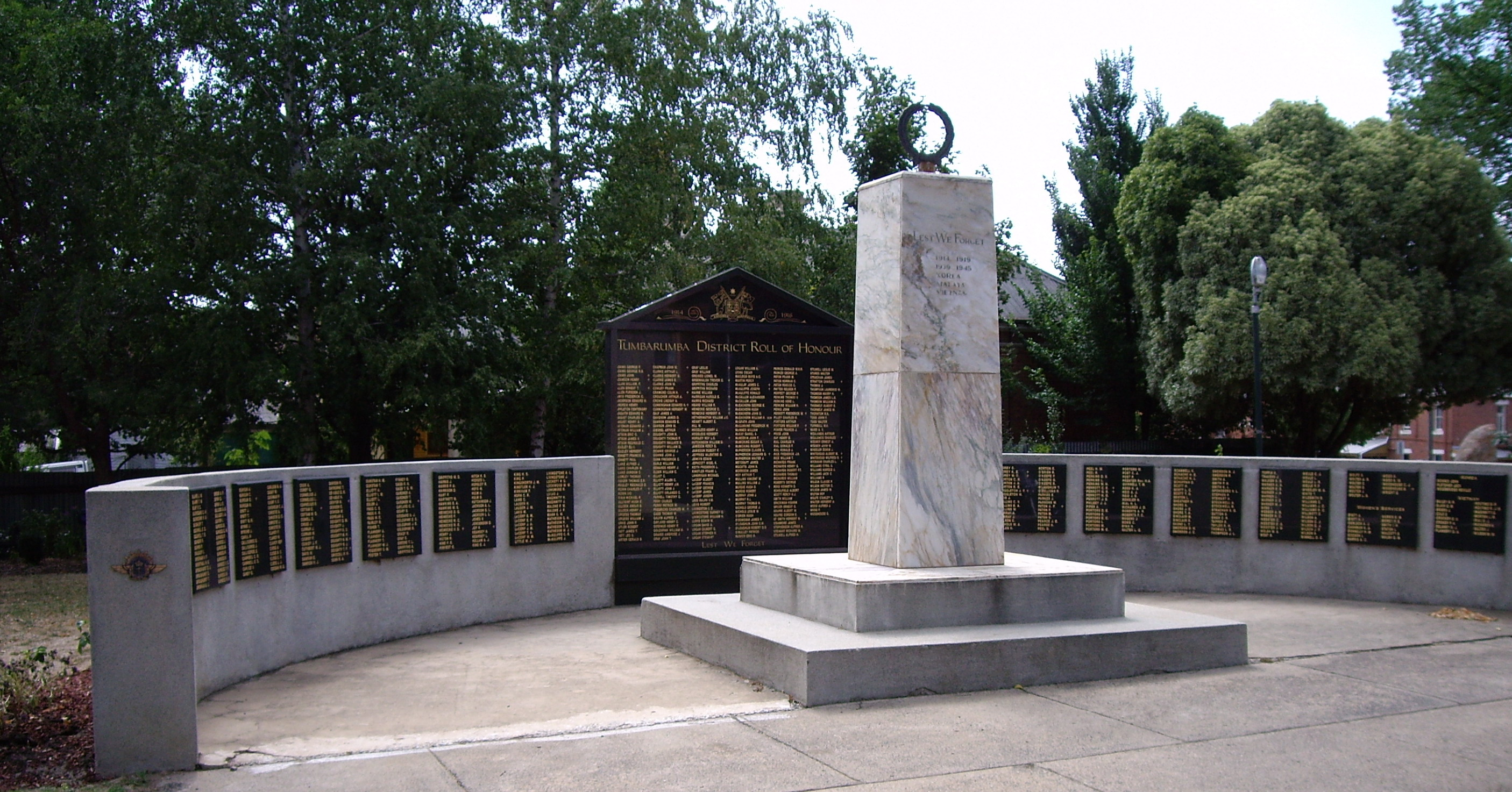
Tumbarumba District Roll of Honour

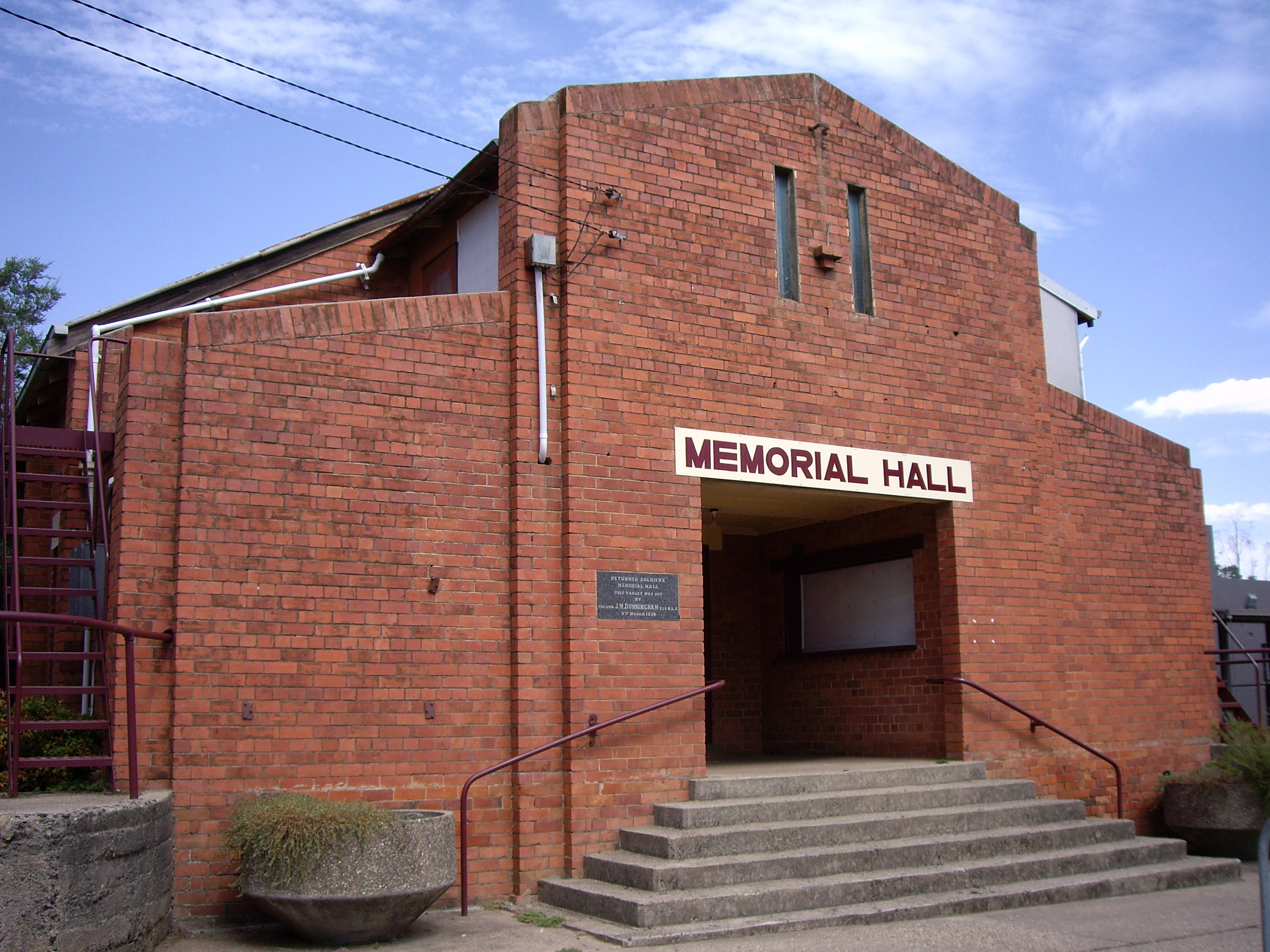
Tumbarumba Memorial Hall

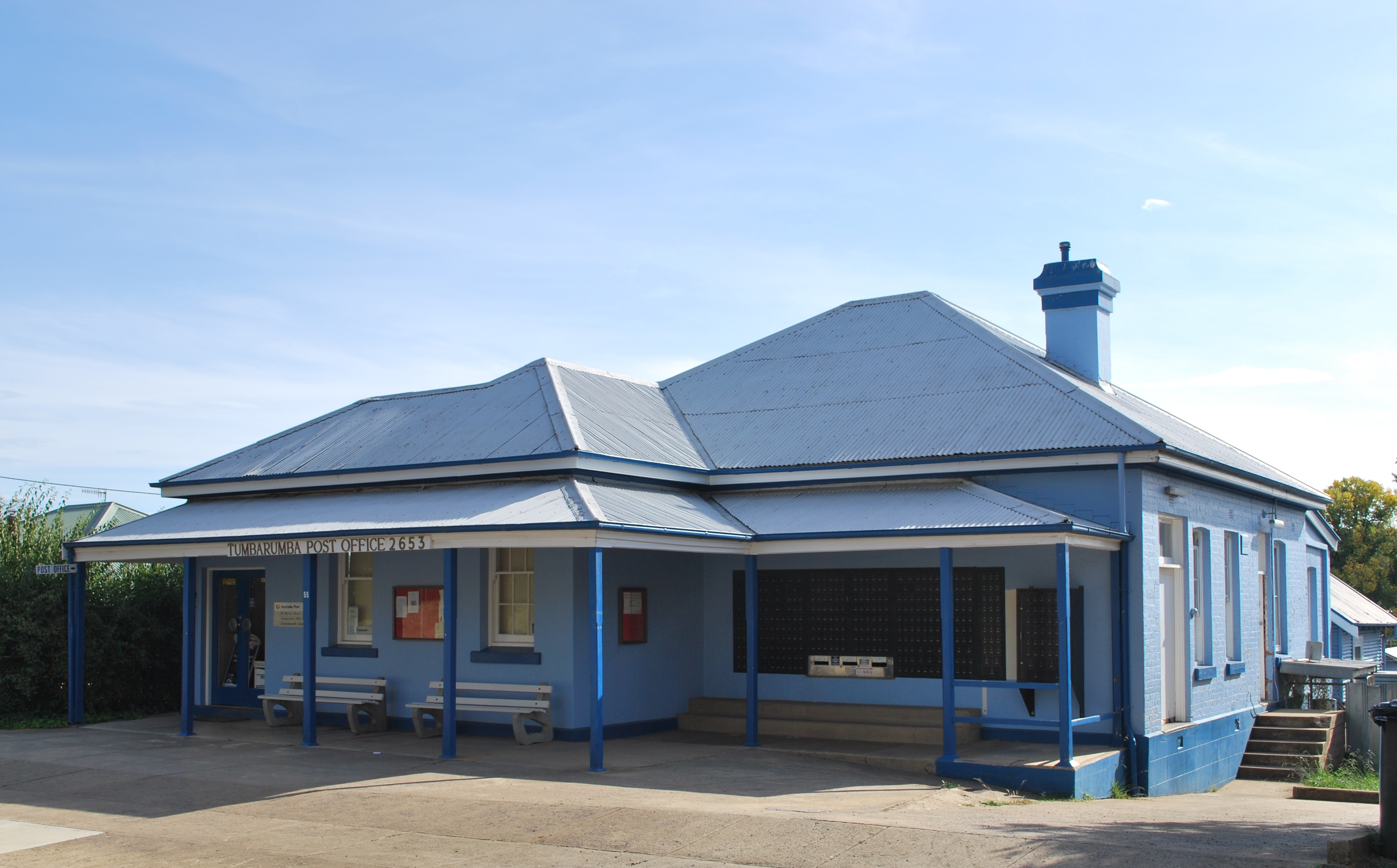
Post office

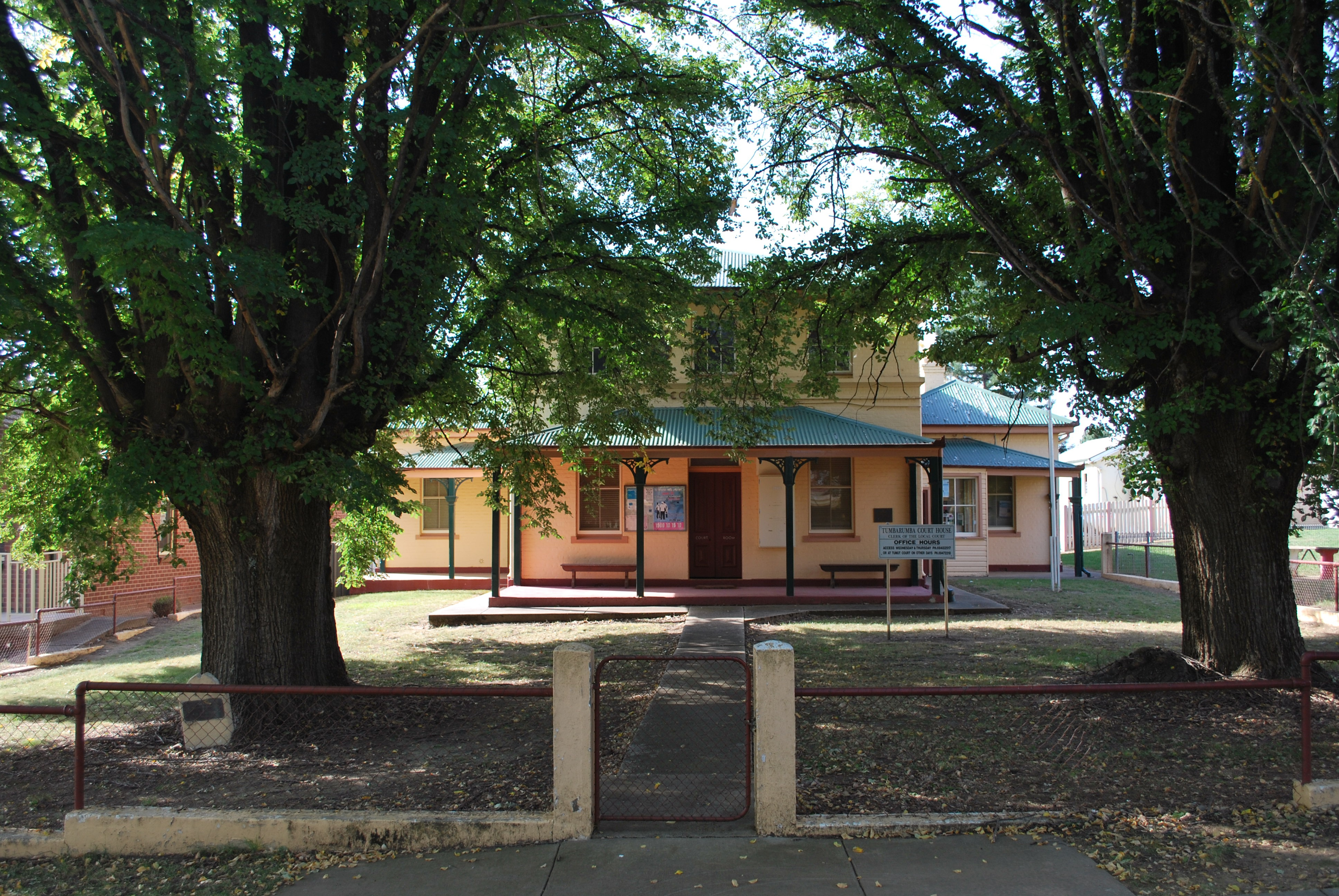
Court house

== See also ==
- Mannus Correctional Centre
