= 2026 NSWRL Major Age Based Competitions =

The New South Wales Rugby League (NSWRL) will administer several major competitions during the 2026 season. These will include tiered open-age competitions across metropolitan and regional New South Wales, as well as a suite of age-based pathway competitions for both male and female players. Along with the Queensland Rugby League, these competitions form a key part of the pathway into the National Rugby League (NRL) and NRLW.

== Jersey Flegg Cup ==
2026 Jersey Flegg Cup
- Duration: 7 March – 26/27 September 2026
- Teams: 14
- Broadcast partners: Streaming; BarTV Sports (All Matches)

The Jersey Flegg Cup is an age-based competition administered by the NSWRL for emerging elite male players. Contested by NRL-aligned and NSWRL pathway clubs, it acts as a bridge between junior representative football and open-age competitions such as the Knock-On Effect NSW Cup and the NRL.

=== Teams ===
==== Club changes ====
- Manly Warringah Sea Eagles – Chris Crotty has been appointed as head coach of the club's Jersey Flegg Cup side for the 2026 season, replacing Anthony Watmough.
- Melbourne Storm – Dan Murphy takes over as head coach of the Jersey Flegg Cup team for 2026, replacing Mark Russell.
- St George Illawarra Dragons – Aaron Gorrell has been appointed as head coach of the Jersey Flegg Cup side for 2026, replacing Shane Millard.

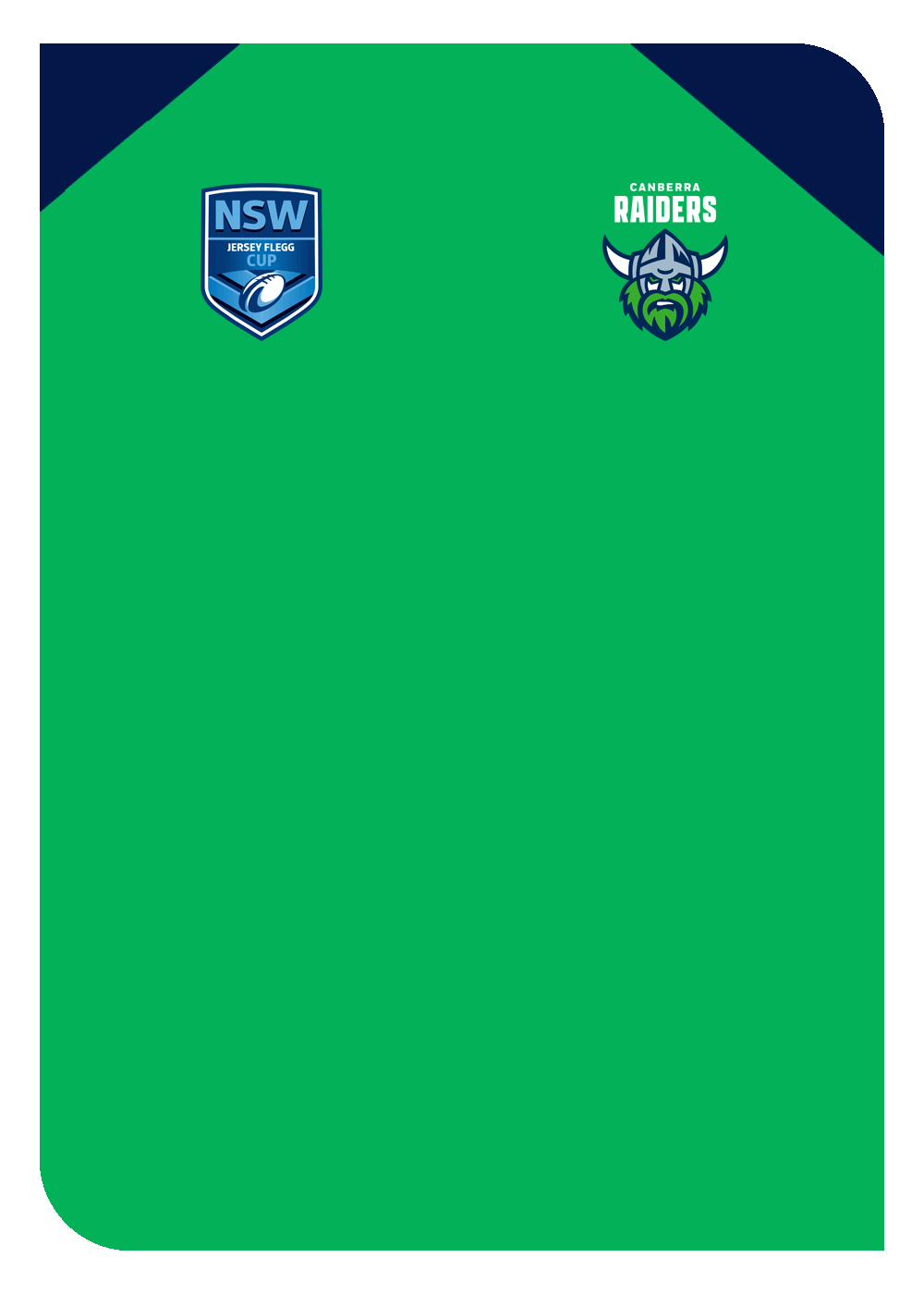
Canberra; Raiders Ground: Seiffert Oval City/Suburb: Queanbeyan (Queanbeyan East) Coach: Jordan Macey Affiliate: Canberra Raiders

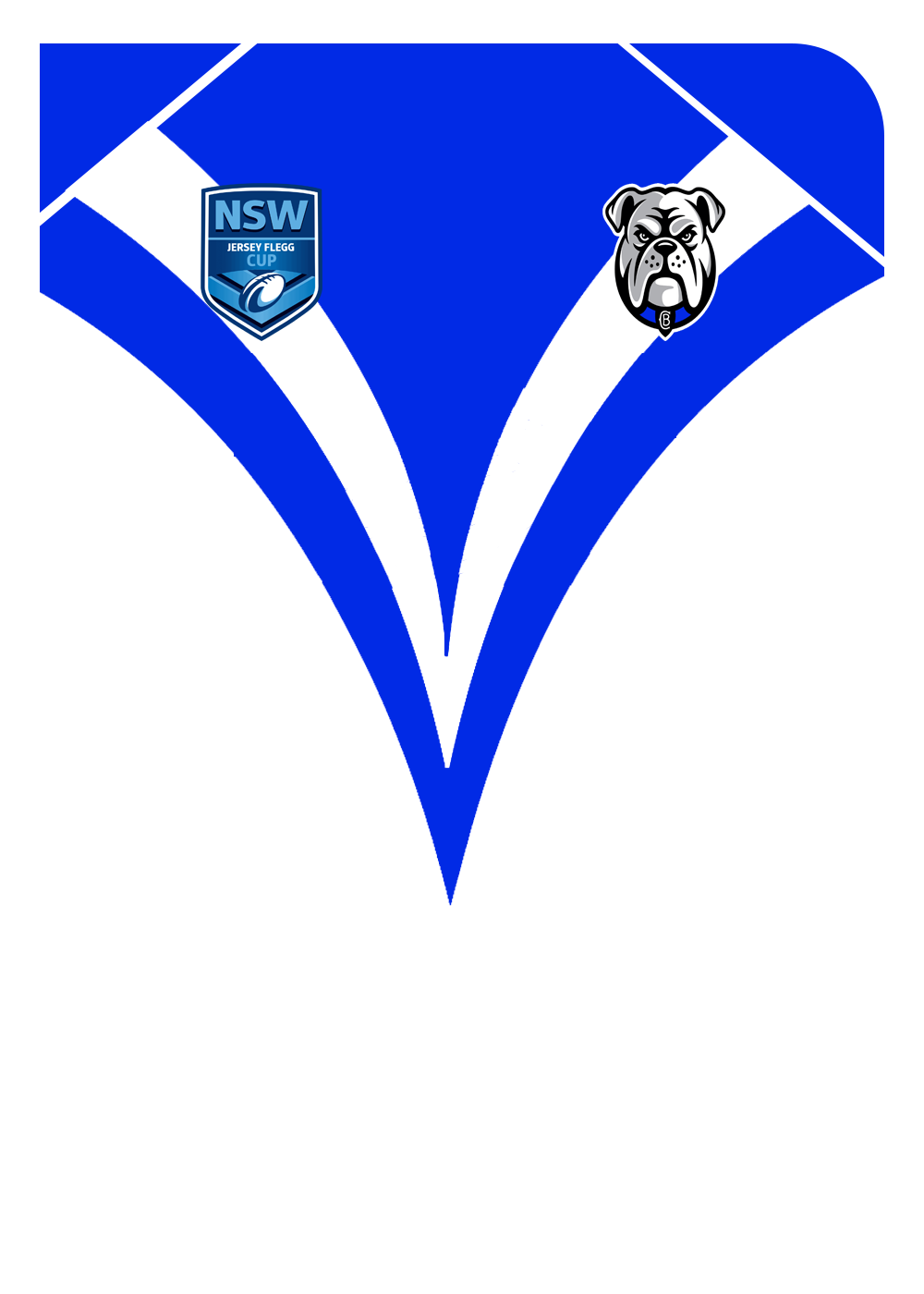
Canterbury-Bankstown; Bulldogs Ground: Belmore Sports Ground City/Suburb: Sydney (Belmore) Coach: Josh Jackson Affiliate: Canterbury-Bankstown Bulldogs

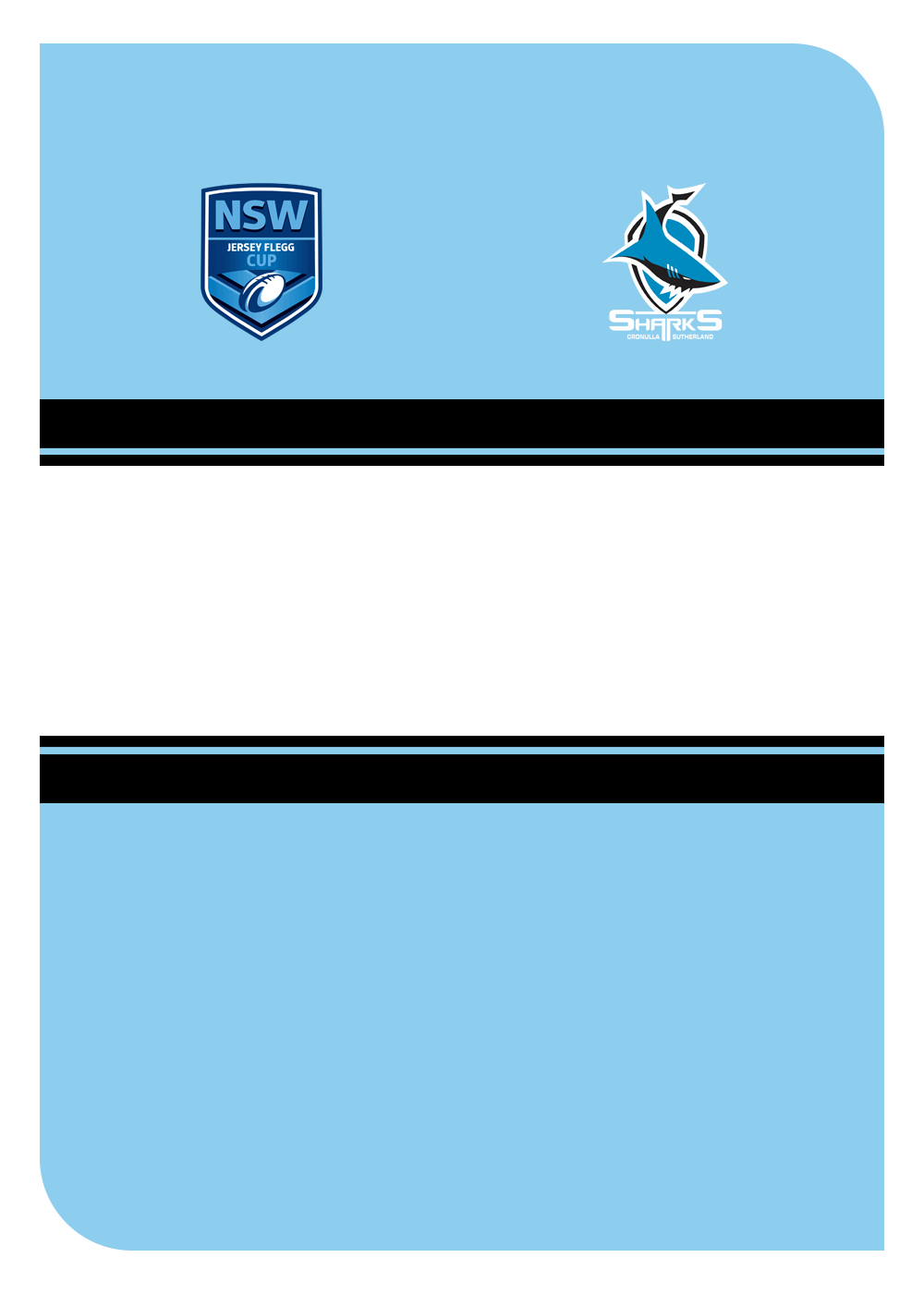
Cronulla-Sutherland; Sharks Ground: Ocean Protect Stadium City/Suburb: Sydney (Woolooware) Coach: Andrew Dallalana Affiliate: Cronulla-Sutherland Sharks

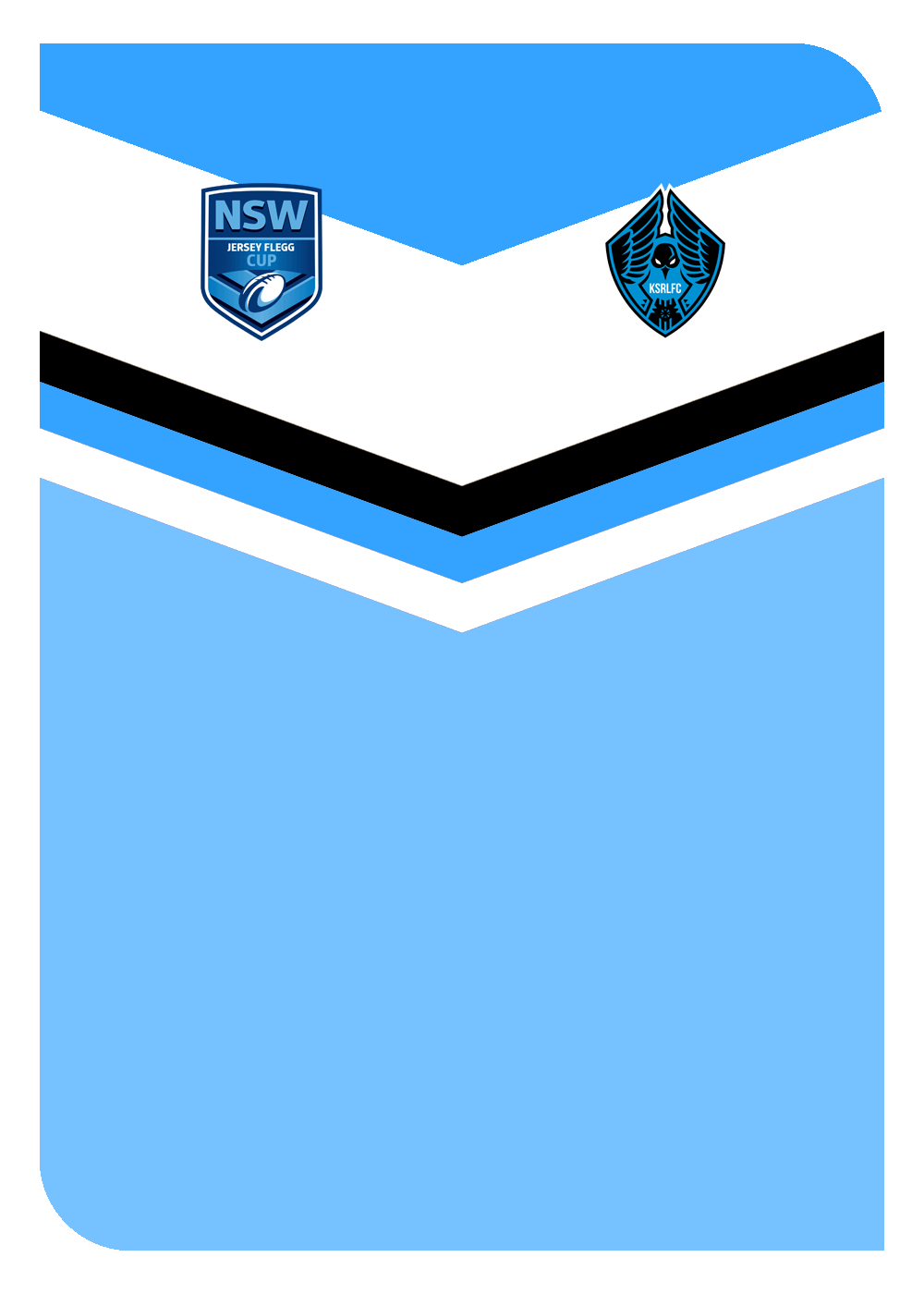
Kaiviti; Silktails Ground: Churchill Park City/Suburb: Lautoka Coach: Timoce Duve Affiliate: Canterbury-Bankstown Bulldogs

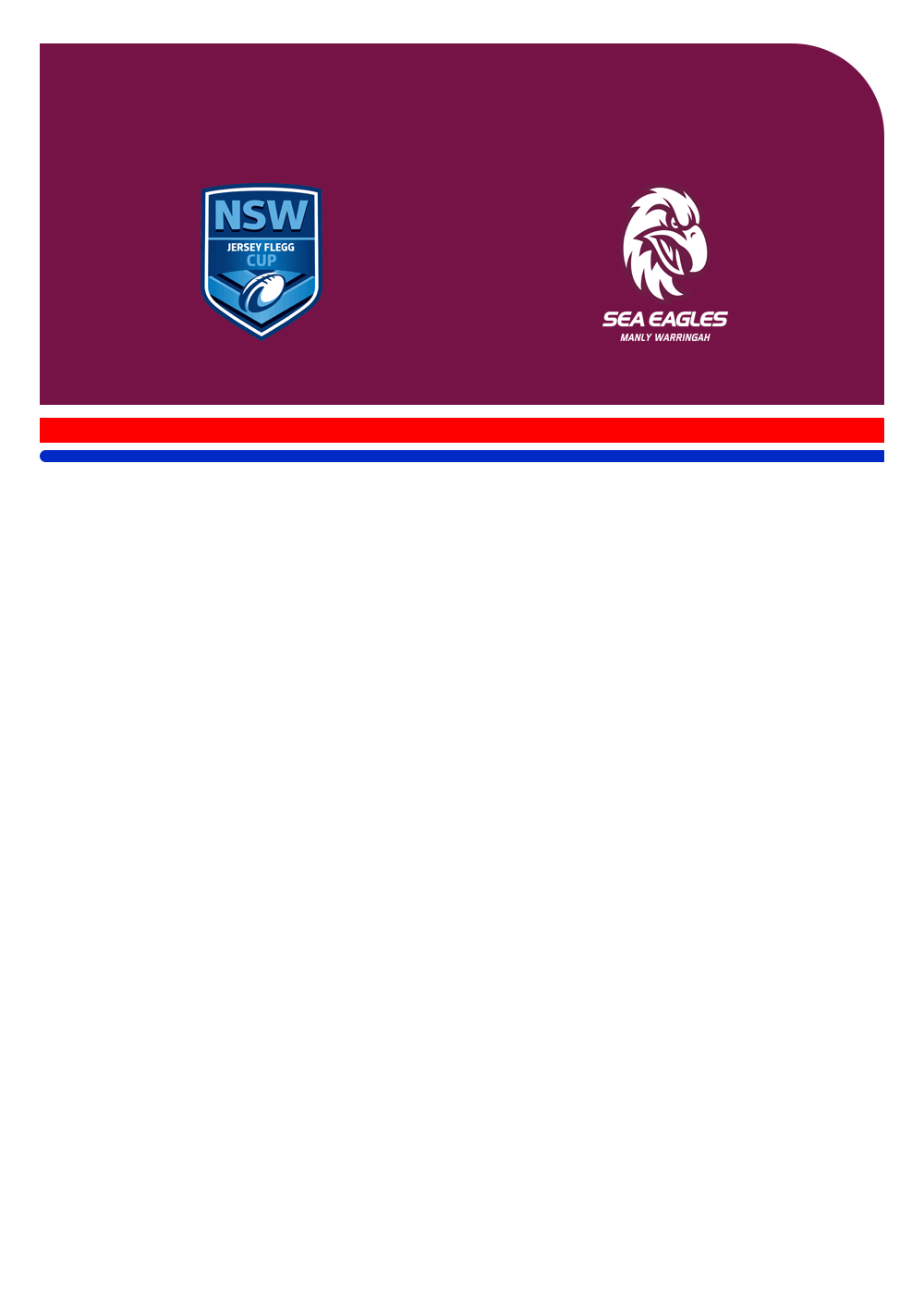
Manly Warringah; Sea Eagles Ground: 4 Pines Park City/Suburb: Sydney (Brookvale) Coach: Chris Crotty Affiliate: Manly Warringah Sea Eagles

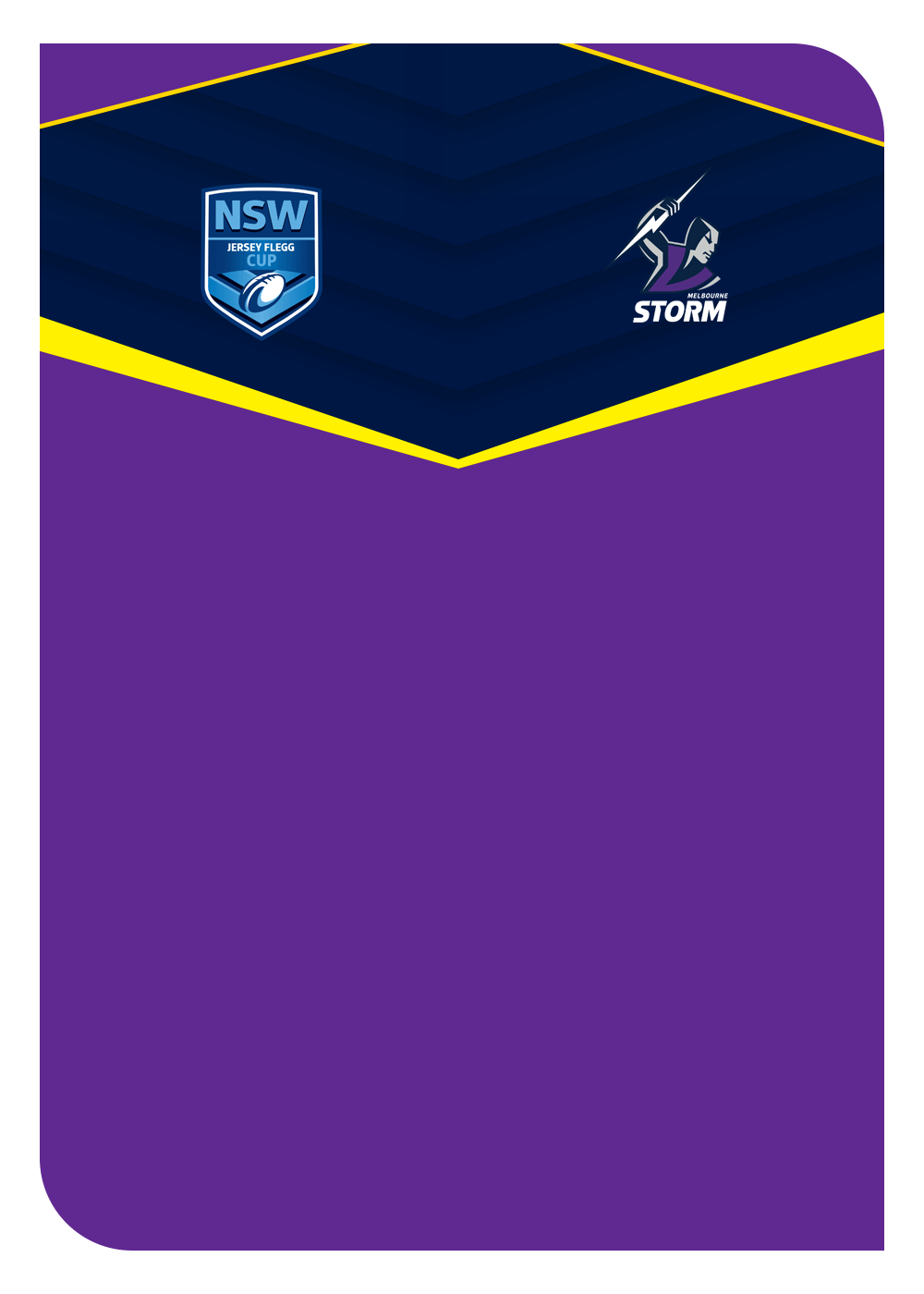
Melbourne; Storm Ground: Seabrook Reserve City/Suburb: Melbourne (Broadmeadows) Coach: Dan Murphy Affiliate: Melbourne Storm

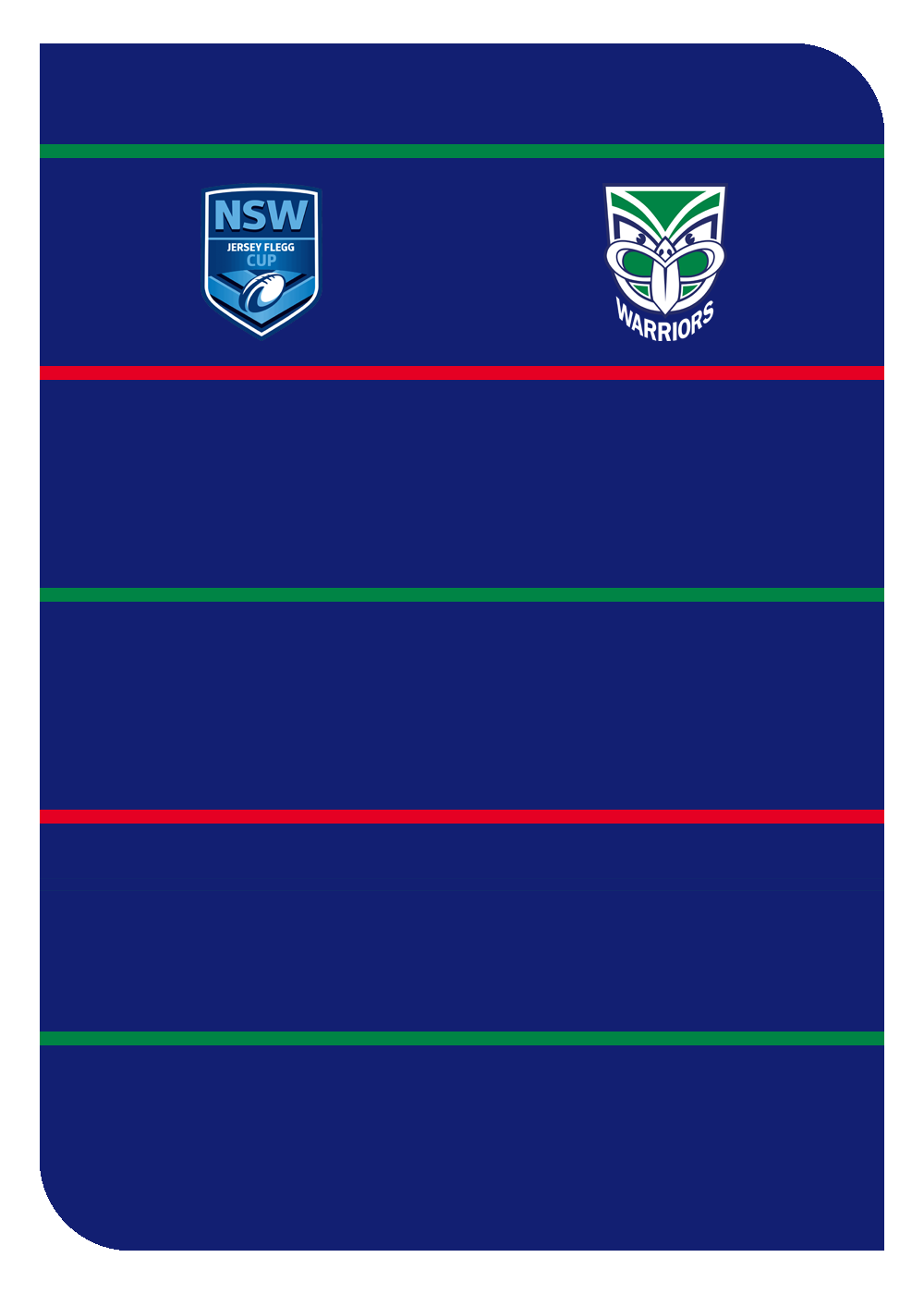
New Zealand; Warriors Ground: Trusts Stadium City/Suburb: Auckland (Henderson) Coach: TBA Affiliate: New Zealand Warriors

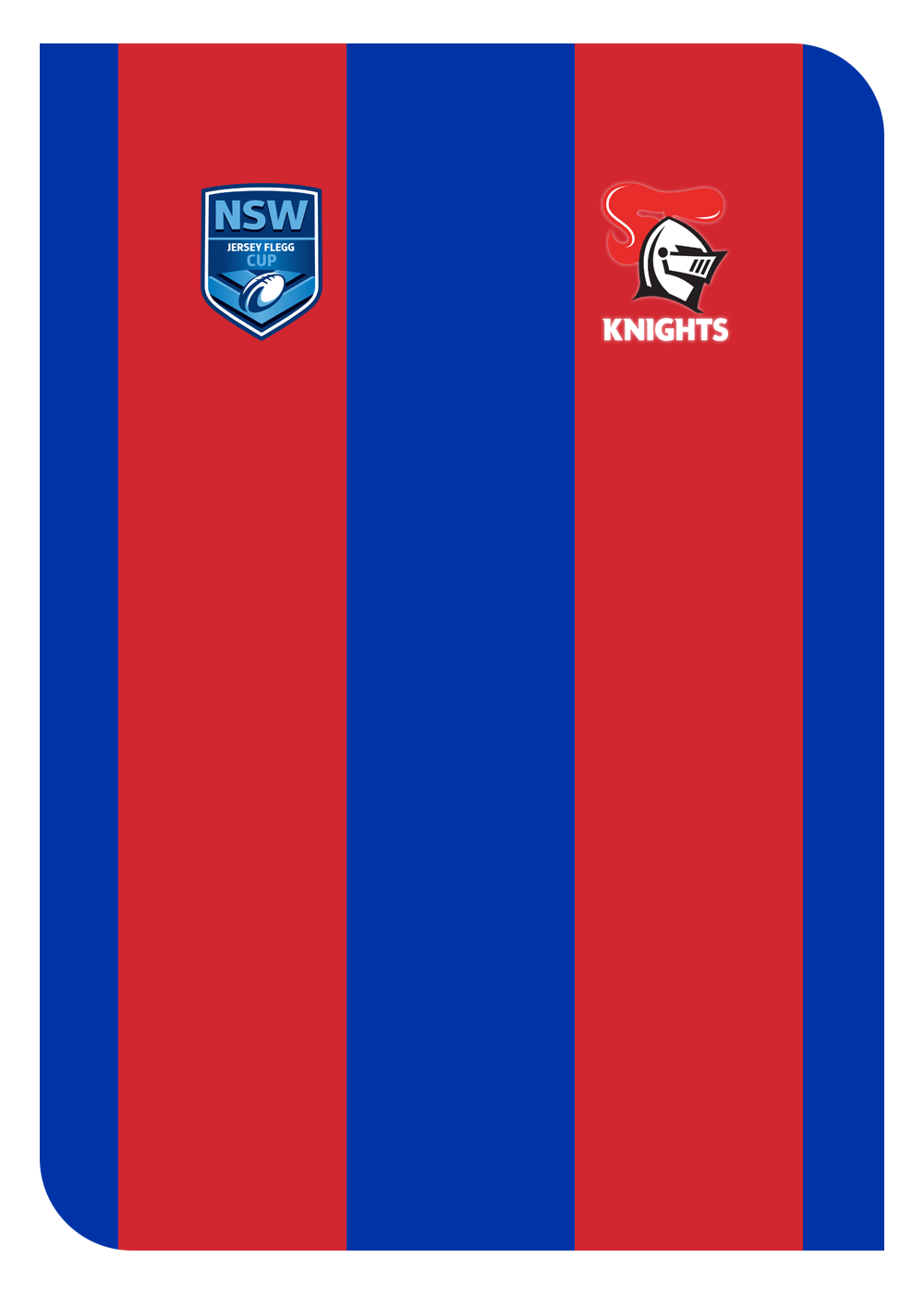
Newcastle; Knights Ground: Newcastle Knights Centre of Excellence City/Suburb: Newcastle (Broadmeadow) Coach: Alex Moore Affiliate: Newcastle Knights

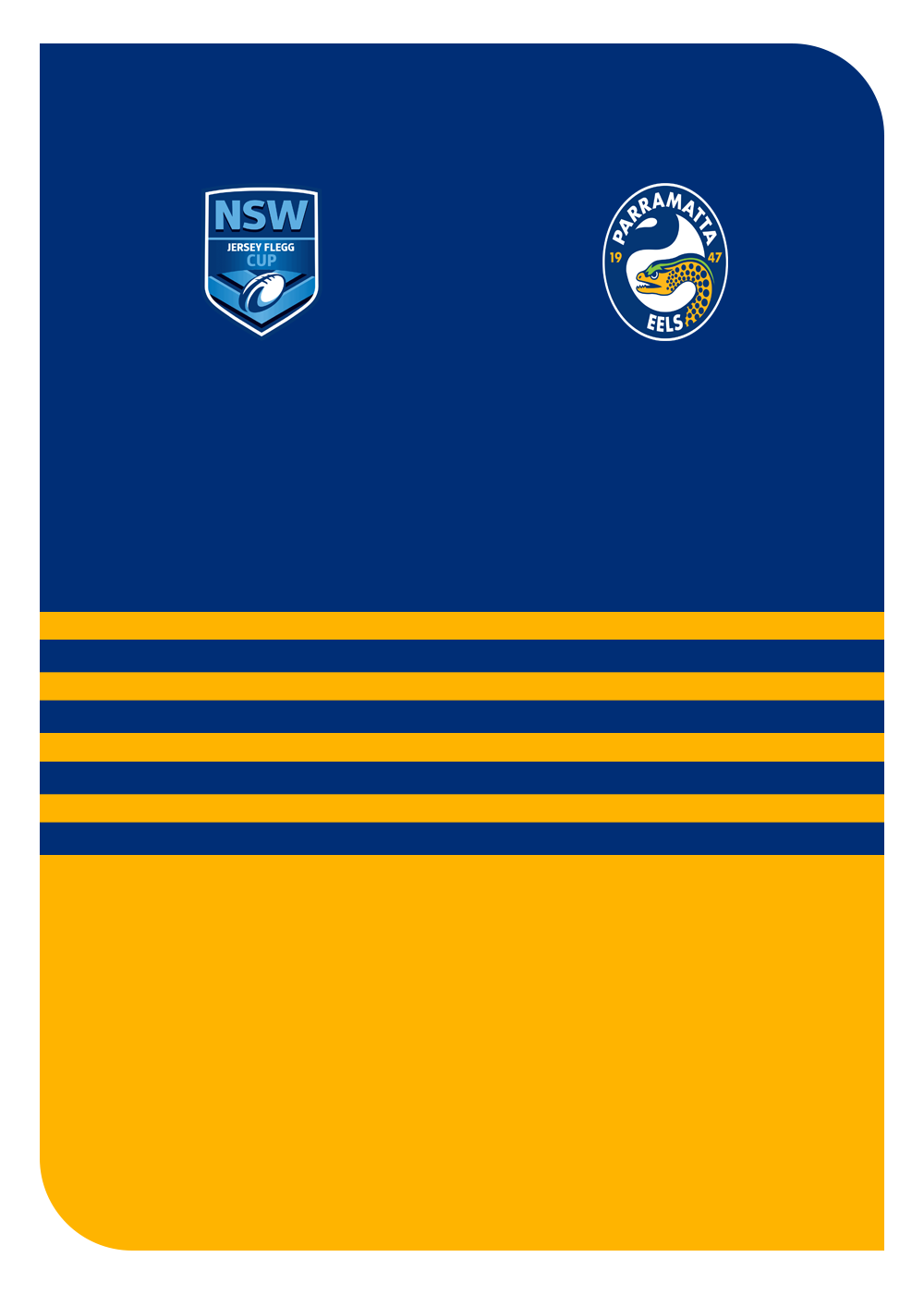
Parramatta; Eels Ground: James Hardie Centre of Excellence City/Suburb: Sydney (Kellyville) Coach: Jordan Rankin Affiliate: Parramatta Eels

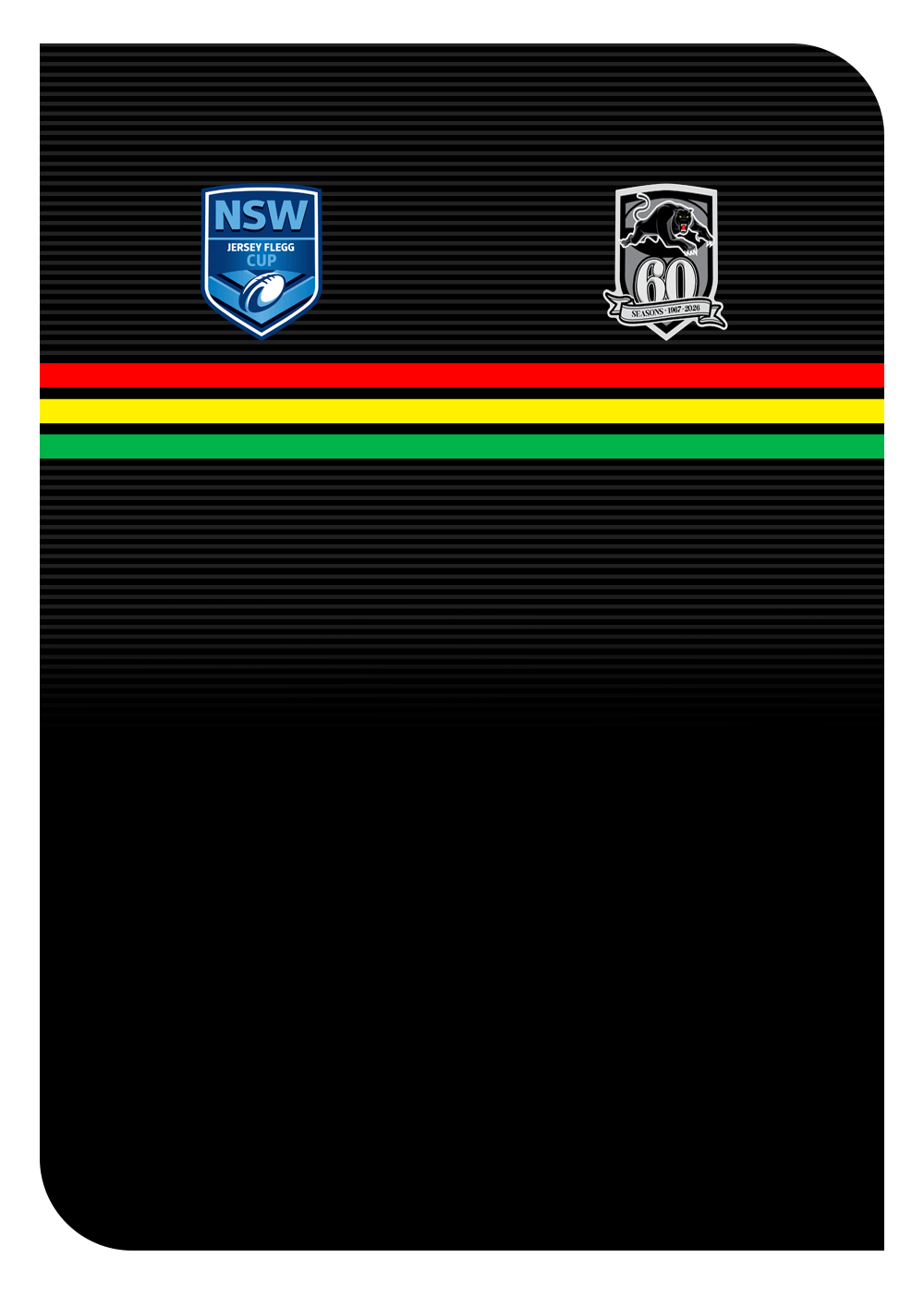
Penrith; Panthers Ground: Parker Street Reserve City/Suburb: Sydney (Penrith) Coach: TBA Affiliate: Penrith Panthers

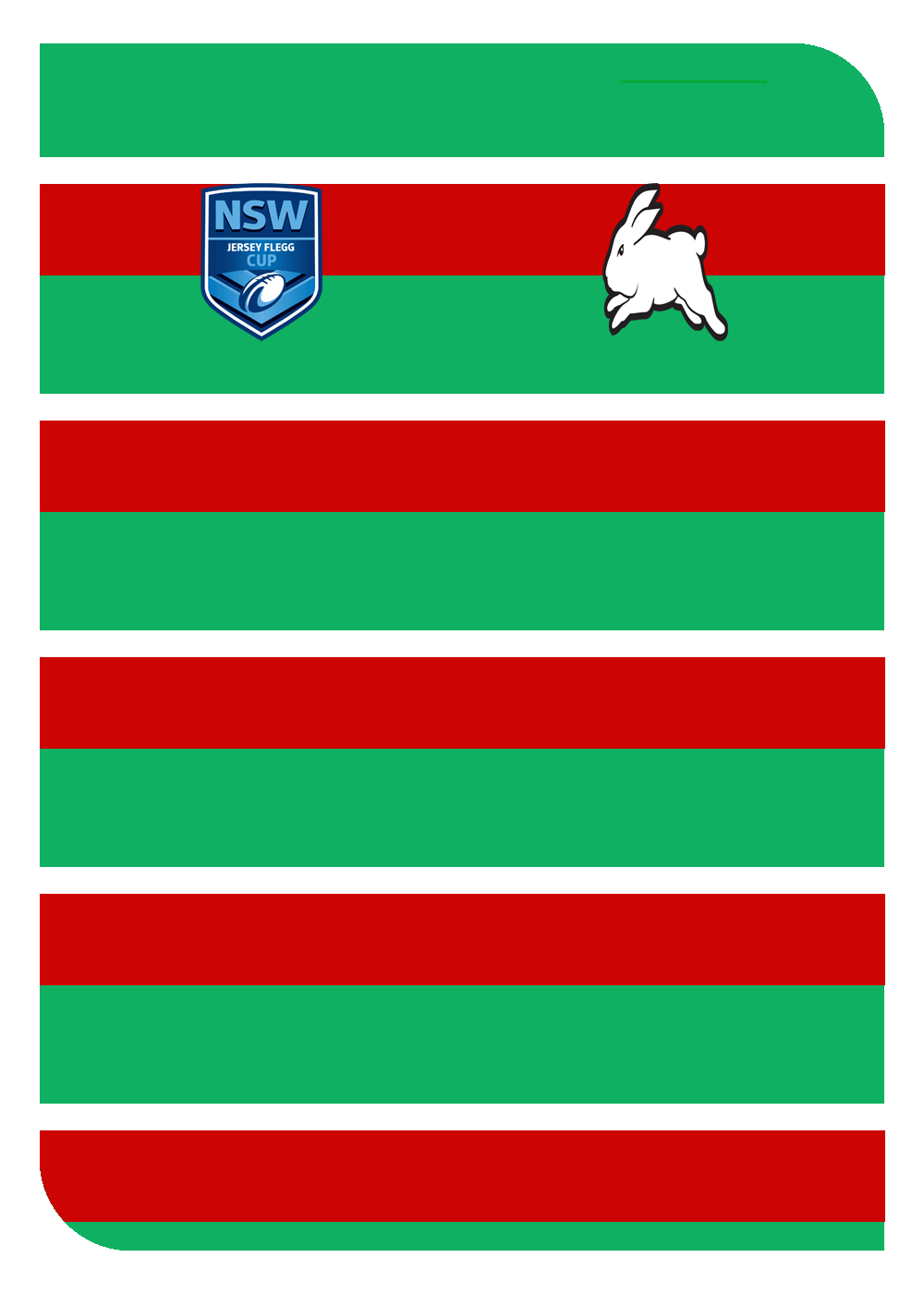
South Sydney; Rabbitohs Ground: Redfern Oval City/Suburb: Sydney (Redfern) Coach: Scott Kenna Affiliate: South Sydney Rabbitohs

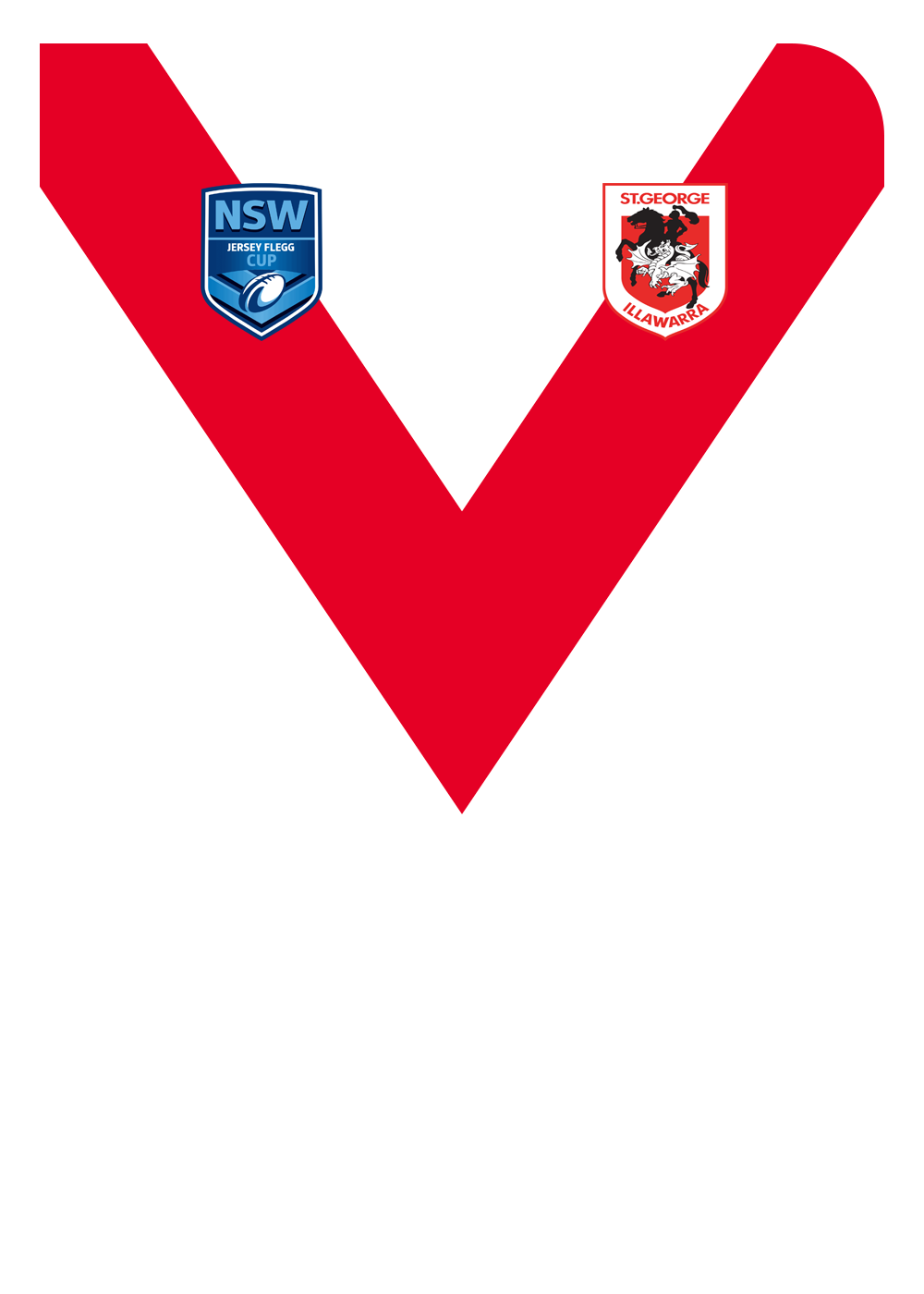
St George Illawarra; Dragons Ground: Collegians Sports Stadium City/Suburb: Wollongong (Figtree) Coach: Aaron Gorrell Affiliate: St. George Illawarra Dragons

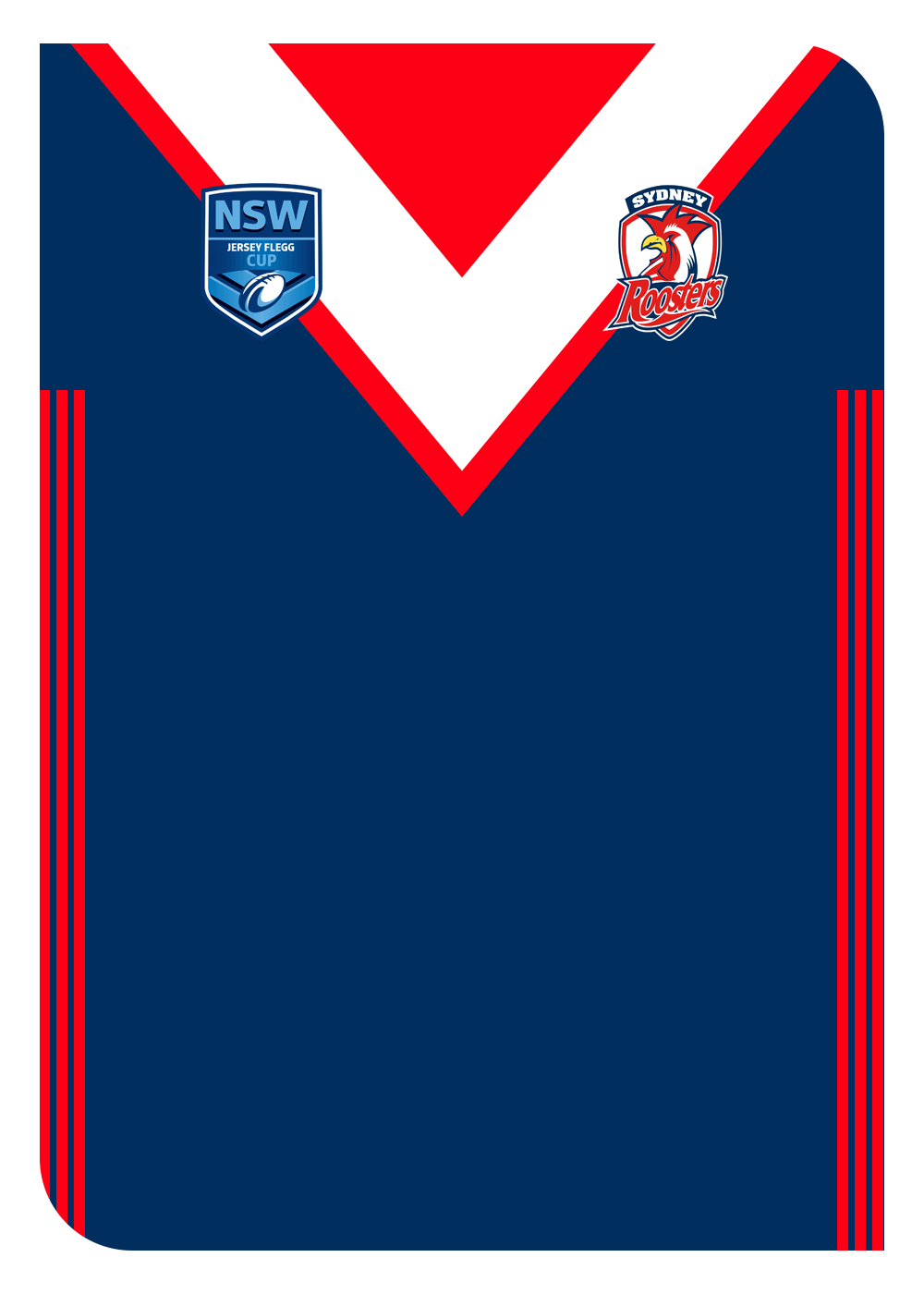
Sydney; Roosters Ground: Wentworth Park City/Suburb: Sydney (Glebe) Coach: Dean Feeney Affiliate: Sydney Roosters

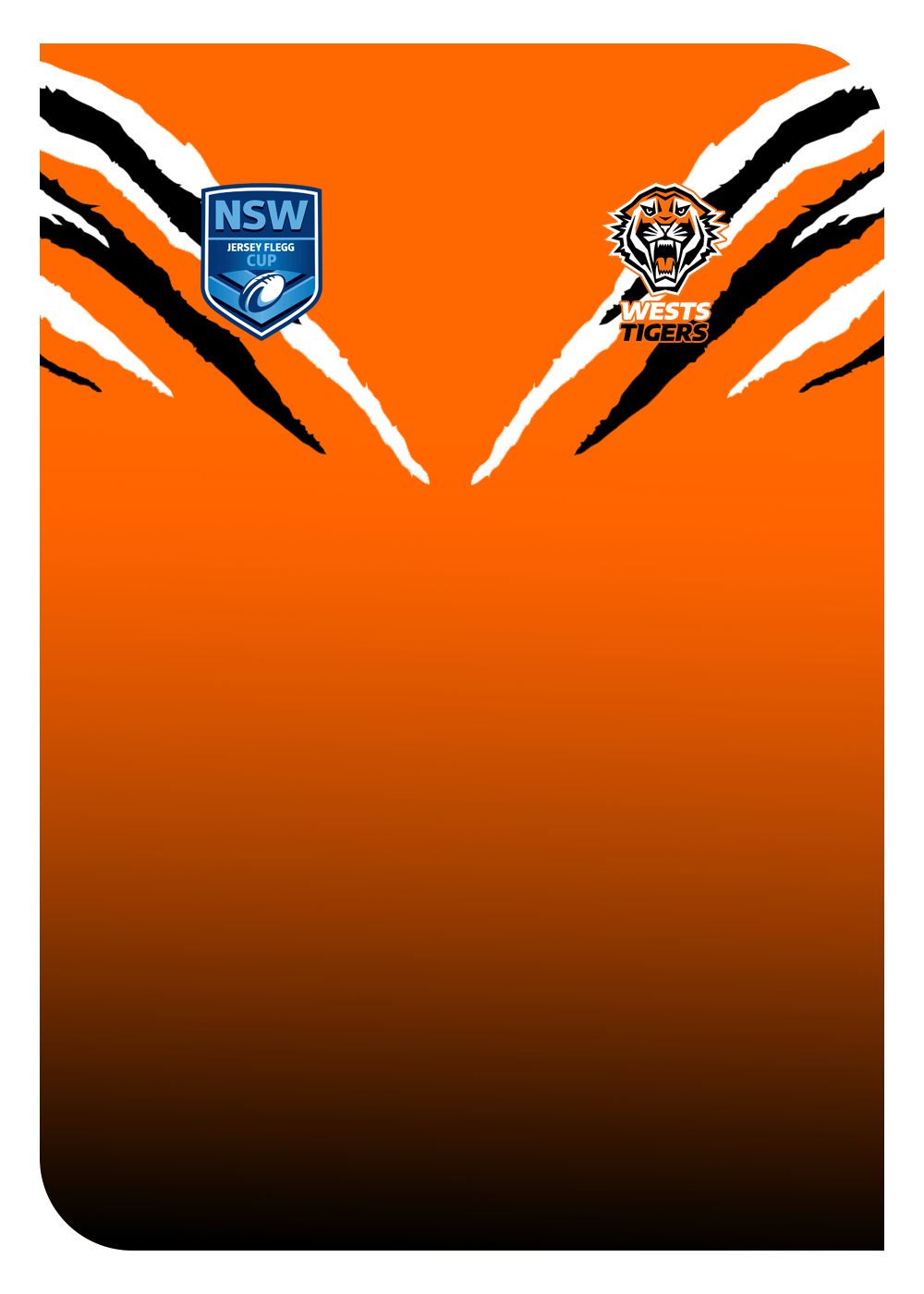
Wests; Tigers Ground: Lidcombe Oval City/Suburb: Sydney (Lidcombe) Coach: Shane Sultana Affiliate: Wests Tigers

=== Ladder ===
Pos	Team	Pld	W	D	L	B	PF	PA	PD	Pts	Qualification
1	Penrith Panthers (U21s)	5	5	0	0	0	146	122	+24	10	Minor Premiers & Major Semi-Final
2	St George Illawarra Dragons (U21s)	4	3	0	1	1	98	52	+46	8	Qualifying Final
3	Parramatta Eels (U21s)	4	3	0	1	1	96	60	+36	8	Qualifying Final
4	Canterbury-Bankstown Bulldogs (U21s)	4	3	0	1	1	92	96	–4	8	Elimination Final
5	South Sydney Rabbitohs (U21s)	4	2	1	1	1	108	88	+20	7	Elimination Final
6	Wests Tigers (U21s)	4	2	1	1	1	114	98	+16	7	
7	New Zealand Warriors (U21s)	5	3	0	2	0	178	120	+58	6	
8	Canberra Raiders (U21s)	5	3	0	2	0	180	144	+36	6	
9	Cronulla-Sutherland Sharks (U21s)	4	2	0	2	1	110	100	+10	6	
10	Sydney Roosters (U21s)	4	1	0	3	1	106	132	–26	4	
11	Kaiviti Silktails (U21s)	4	1	0	3	1	68	128	–60	4	
12	Melbourne Storm (U21s)	4	0	0	4	1	84	114	–30	2	
13	Manly Warringah Sea Eagles (U21s)	4	0	0	4	1	88	126	–34	2	
14	Newcastle Knights (U21s)	5	1	0	4	0	74	162	–88	2	

Updated to match(es) played on 1 September. Source:
Rules for classification: 1) points; 2) point difference; 3) points scored

==== Ladder progression ====
- Numbers highlighted in green indicate that the team finished the round inside the top 5.
- Numbers highlighted in blue indicates the team finished first on the ladder in that round.
- Numbers highlighted in red indicates the team finished last place on the ladder in that round.
- Underlined numbers indicate that the team had a bye during that round.

Pos	Team	1	2	3	4	5	6	7	8	9	10	11	12	13	14	15	16	17	18	19	20	21	22	23	24	25	26
1	Penrith Panthers (U21s)	2	4	6	8	10																					
2	St George Illawarra Dragons (U21s)	2	4	4	6	8																					
3	Parramatta Eels (U21s)	2	4	6	6	8																					
4	Canterbury-Bankstown Bulldogs (U21s)	0	2	4	6	8																					
5	South Sydney Rabbitohs (U21s)	2	4	5	7	7																					
6	Wests Tigers (U21s)	2	4	5	7	7																					
7	New Zealand Warriors (U21s)	2	4	6	6	6																					
8	Canberra Raiders (U21s)	2	2	2	4	6																					
9	Cronulla-Sutherland Sharks (U21s)	2	2	4	4	6																					
10	Sydney Roosters (U21s)	0	0	0	2	4																					
11	Kaiviti Silktails (U21s)	0	0	2	2	4																					
12	Melbourne Storm (U21s)	0	0	0	2	2																					
13	Manly Warringah Sea Eagles (U21s)	0	0	2	2	2																					
14	Newcastle Knights (U21s)	0	2	2	2	2																					

Season Results:

Home	Score	Away	Match Information
Home	Score	Away	Date and Time	Venue	Referee	Video
Round 1
New Zealand Warriors (U21s)	44 – 14	Sydney Roosters (U21s)	Saturday, 7 March, 12:00pm	Navigation Homes Stadium	Jack Feavers
Penrith Panthers (U21s)	22 – 12	Kaiviti Silktails (U21s)	Saturday, 7 March, 12:00pm	St Marys Leagues Stadium	Michael Ford
Canterbury-Bankstown Bulldogs (U21s)	0 – 28	St George Illawarra Dragons (U21s)	Saturday, 7 March, 2:00pm	Belmore Sports Ground	Karra-Lee Nolan
Manly Warringah Sea Eagles (U21s)	30 – 38	Canberra Raiders (U21s)	Saturday, 7 March, 3:15pm	4 Pines Park	Tom Stindl
Melbourne Storm (U21s)	18 – 28	Parramatta Eels (U21s)	Saturday, 7 March, 3:30pm	Gosch's Paddock	Billy Greatbatch
Newcastle Knights (U21s)	14 – 26	South Sydney Rabbitohs (U21s)	Sunday, 8 March, 12:00pm	Cessnock Sportsground	Brayden Hunt
Cronulla-Sutherland Sharks (U21s)	BYE	Wests Tigers (U21s)
Round 2
New Zealand Warriors (U21s)	48 – 28	Canberra Raiders (U21s)	Saturday, 14 March, 11:00am	Aubrey Keech Reserve	Gage Miles
St George Illawarra Dragons (U21s)	30 – 28	Melbourne Storm (U21s)	Saturday, 14 March, 1:00pm	Croome Road Sporting Complex	Michael Ford
Penrith Panthers (U21s)	34 – 32	Cronulla-Sutherland Sharks (U21s)	Saturday, 14 March, 2:30pm	St Marys Leagues Stadium	Karra-Lee Nolan
South Sydney Rabbitohs (U21s)	40 – 22	Sydney Roosters (U21s)	Sunday, 15 March, 11:45am	Redfern Oval	Billy Greatbatch
Manly Warringah Sea Eagles (U21s)	14 – 16	Newcastle Knights (U21s)	Sunday, 15 March, 12:00pm	4 Pines Park	Brendan Mani
Wests Tigers (U21s)	52 – 16	Kaiviti Silktails (U21s)	Sunday, 15 March, 3:00pm	Leichhardt Oval	Mitchell Pitscheider
Canterbury-Bankstown Bulldogs (U21s)	BYE	Parramatta Eels (U21s)
Round 3
Newcastle Knights (U21s)	6 – 44	New Zealand Warriors (U21s)	Saturday, 21 March, 10:30am	McDonald Jones Stadium	Harrison Baysarri
Canberra Raiders (U21s)	26 – 30	Canterbury-Bankstown Bulldogs (U21s)	Saturday, 21 March, 12:45pm	Raiders Belconnen	Liam Richardson
Parramatta Eels (U21s)	12 – 10	St George Illawarra Dragons (U21s)	Saturday, 21 March, 2:00pm	James Hardie Centre of Excellence	Bailey Warren
Cronulla-Sutherland Sharks (U21s)	22 – 12	Melbourne Storm (U21s)	Saturday, 21 March, 3:05pm	Ocean Projects Stadium	Salvatore Marigliano
South Sydney Rabbitohs (U21s)	22 – 22	Wests Tigers (U21s)	Saturday, 21 March, 3:25pm	Polytec Stadium	Mitchell Pitscheider
Sydney Roosters (U21s)	26 – 28	Penrith Panthers (U21s)	Sunday, 22 March, 12:30pm	Wentworth Park	Lachlan Greenfield
Kaiviti Silktails (U21s)	BYE	Manly Warringah Sea Eagles (U21s)
Round 4
Kaiviti Silktails (U21s)	12 – 30	St George Illawarra Dragons (U21s)	Saturday, 28 March, 12:00pm	Churchill Park	Salvatore Marigliano
Canterbury-Bankstown Bulldogs (U21s)	32 – 22	Newcastle Knights (U21s)	Saturday, 28 March, 2:15pm	Belmore Sports Ground	Lachlan Greenfield
Penrith Panthers (U21s)	28 – 26	Parramatta Eels (U21s)	Saturday, 28 March, 4:45pm	St Marys Leagues Stadium	Ryan Micallef
Canberra Raiders (U21s)	42 – 20	Cronulla-Sutherland Sharks (U21s)	Sunday, 29 March, 11:45am	GIO Stadium	Liam Richardson
New Zealand Warriors (U21s)	30 – 36	Wests Tigers (U21s)	Sunday, 29 March, 1:15pm	Bruce Pulman Park	Jack Feavers
Manly Warringah Sea Eagles (U21s)	20 – 44	Sydney Roosters (U21s)	Sunday, 29 March, 4:00pm	Sydney Academy of Sport	Harrison Baysarri
South Sydney Rabbitohs (U21s)	BYE	Melbourne Storm (U21s)
Round 5 (Easter Round)
South Sydney Rabbitohs (U21s)	20 – 30	Canterbury-Bankstown Bulldogs (U21s)	Friday, 3 April, 11:00am	Redfern Oval	Harrison Baysarri
Manly Warringah Sea Eagles (U21s)	24 – 28	Kaiviti Silktails (U21s)	Saturday, 4 April, 1:00pm	Sydney Academy of Sport	Mitchell Pitscheider
Penrith Panthers (U21s)	34 – 26	Melbourne Storm (U21s)	Saturday, 4 April, 2:00pm	Penrith Panthers Academy	Gage Miles
Parramatta Eels (U21s)	30 – 4	Wests Tigers (U21s)	Saturday, 4 April, 4:15pm	James Hardie Centre of Excellence	Lachlan Greenfield
Newcastle Knights (U21s)	16 – 46	Canberra Raiders (U21s)	Sunday, 5 April, 10:30am	Newcastle Knights Centre of Excellence	Brayden Hunt
Cronulla-Sutherland Sharks (U21s)	36 – 12	New Zealand Warriors (U21s)	Sunday, 5 April, 11:35am	Ocean Protect Stadium	Salvatore Marigliano
St George Illawarra Dragons (U21s)	BYE	Sydney Roosters (U21s)
Round 6
St George Illawarra Dragons (U21s)	V	Manly Warringah Sea Eagles (U21s)	Saturday, 11 April, 11:00am	Collegians Sports Stadium	TBA
Kaiviti Silktails (U21s)	V	Canberra Raiders (U21s)	Saturday, 11 April, 12:00pm	TBA	TBA
Canterbury-Bankstown Bulldogs (U21s)	V	Penrith Panthers (U21s)	Saturday, 11 April, 12:00pm	Belmore Sports Ground	TBA
Cronulla-Sutherland Sharks (U21s)	V	Sydney Roosters (U21s)	Saturday, 11 April, 12:50pm	Henson Park	TBA
Wests Tigers (U21s)	V	Newcastle Knights (U21s)	Saturday, 11 April, 3:00pm	Leichhardt Oval	TBA
Melbourne Storm (U21s)	V	New Zealand Warriors (U21s)	Saturday, 11 April, 3:00pm	Gosch's Paddock	TBA
Parramatta Eels (U21s)	V	South Sydney Rabbitohs (U21s)	Sunday, 12 April, 3:30pm	James Hardie Centre of Excellence	TBA
Round 7
New Zealand Warriors (U21s)	V	Manly Warringah Sea Eagles (U21s)	Friday, 17 April, TBA	Go Media Stadium	TBA
South Sydney Rabbitohs (U21s)	V	St George Illawarra Dragons (U21s)	Saturday, 18 April, 11:45am	Redfern Oval	TBA
Kaiviti Silktails (U21s)	V	Cronulla-Sutherland Sharks (U21s)	Saturday, 18 April, 12:00pm	Churchill Park	TBA
Canberra Raiders (U21s)	V	Melbourne Storm (U21s)	Saturday, 18 April, 12:00pm	Seiffert Oval	TBA
Parramatta Eels (U21s)	V	Canterbury-Bankstown Bulldogs (U21s)	Sunday, 19 April, 2:00pm	James Hardie Centre of Excellence	TBA
Sydney Roosters (U21s)	V	Newcastle Knights (U21s)	Sunday, 19 April, 12:30pm	Wentworth Park	TBA
Wests Tigers (U21s)	BYE	Penrith Panthers (U21s)
Round 8 (ANZAC Round)
Cronulla-Sutherland Sharks (U21s)	V	Canterbury-Bankstown Bulldogs (U21s)	Friday, 24 April, 11:50am	Henson Park	TBA
Melbourne Storm (U21s)	V	South Sydney Rabbitohs (U21s)	Friday, 24 April, 2:00pm	Seabrook Reserve	TBA
New Zealand Warriors (U21s)	V	Kaiviti Silktails (U21s)	Friday, 24 April, TBA	Go Media Stadium	TBA
Wests Tigers (U21s)	V	Canberra Raiders (U21s)	Saturday, 25 April, 12:00pm	Lidcombe Oval	TBA
Newcastle Knights (U21s)	V	Penrith Panthers (U21s)	Saturday, 25 April, 1:00pm	Knights Centre of Excellence	TBA
St George Illawarra Dragons (U21s)	V	Sydney Roosters (U21s)	Sunday, 26 April, 11:00am	Collegians Sports Stadium	TBA
Manly Warringah Sea Eagles (U21s)	V	Parramatta Eels (U21s)	Sunday, 26 April, 12:00pm	Sydney Academy of Sport	TBA
Round 9
Parramatta Eels (U21s)	V	New Zealand Warriors (U21s)	Saturday, 2 May, 11:00am	James Hardie Centre of Excellence	TBA
Canterbury-Bankstown Bulldogs (U21s)	V	Kaiviti Silktails (U21s)	Saturday, 2 May, 12:00pm	Belmore Sports Ground	TBA
Newcastle Knights (U21s)	V	Melbourne Storm (U21s)	Sunday, 3 May, 10:00am	Knights Centre of Excellence	TBA
Penrith Panthers (U21s)	V	Manly Warringah Sea Eagles (U21s)	Sunday, 3 May, 11:00am	Parker Street Reserve	TBA
Sydney Roosters (U21s)	V	Canberra Raiders (U21s)	Sunday, 3 May, 12:30pm	Wentworth Park	TBA
Cronulla-Sutherland Sharks (U21s)	V	Wests Tigers (U21s)	Sunday, 3 May, 1:50pm	Ocean Protect Stadium	TBA
St George Illawarra Dragons (U21s)	BYE	South Sydney Rabbitohs (U21s)
Round 10
Parramatta Eels (U21s)	V	Kaiviti Silktails (U21s)	Saturday, 9 May, 12:00pm	James Hardie Centre of Excellence	TBA
Canterbury-Bankstown Bulldogs (U21s)	V	Sydney Roosters (U21s)	Saturday, 9 May, 12:00pm	Belmore Sports Ground	TBA
St George Illawarra Dragons (U21s)	V	Newcastle Knights (U21s)	Saturday, 9 May, 1:00pm	Collegians Sports Stadium	TBA
Melbourne Storm (U21s)	V	Wests Tigers (U21s)	Saturday, 9 May, 1:00pm	Gosch's Paddock	TBA
South Sydney Rabbitohs (U21s)	V	Cronulla-Sutherland Sharks (U21s)	Sunday, 10 May, 11:45am	Coogee Oval	TBA
Canberra Raiders (U21s)	V	Penrith Panthers (U21s)	Sunday, 10 May, 11:45am	GIO Stadium	TBA
Manly Warringah Sea Eagles (U21s)	BYE	New Zealand Warriors (U21s)
Round 11
Penrith Panthers (U21s)	BYE	Wests Tigers (U21s)
Newcastle Knights (U21s)	BYE	Cronulla-Sutherland Sharks (U21s)
Kaiviti Silktails (U21s)	BYE	Sydney Roosters (U21s)
South Sydney Rabbitohs (U21s)	BYE	Manly Warringah Sea Eagles (U21s)
New Zealand Warriors (U21s)	BYE	Melbourne Storm (U21s)
St George Illawarra Dragons (U21s)	BYE	Parramatta Eels (U21s)
Canterbury-Bankstown Bulldogs (U21s)	BYE	Canberra Raiders (U21s)
Round 12
St George Illawarra Dragons (U21s)	V	New Zealand Warriors (U21s)	Saturday, 23 May, 11:00am	Collegians Sports Stadium	TBA
Kaiviti Silktails (U21s)	V	South Sydney Rabbitohs (U21s)	Saturday, 23 May, 12:00pm	Churchill Park	TBA
Canberra Raiders (U21s)	V	Manly Warringah Sea Eagles (U21s)	Saturday, 23 May, 1:00pm	Seiffert Oval	TBA
Canterbury-Bankstown Bulldogs (U21s)	V	Melbourne Storm (U21s)	Saturday, 23 May, 2:00pm	Belmore Sports Ground	TBA
Parramatta Eels (U21s)	BYE	Cronulla-Sutherland Sharks (U21s)
Newcastle Knights (U21s)	BYE	Wests Tigers (U21s)
Penrith Panthers (U21s)	BYE	Sydney Roosters (U21s)
Round 13
Cronulla-Sutherland Sharks (U21s)	V	Manly Warringah Sea Eagles (U21s)	Friday, 29 May, 5:45pm	Ocean Protect Stadium	TBA
Newcastle Knights (U21s)	V	Parramatta Eels (U21s)	Saturday, 30 May, 10:30am	McDonald Jones Stadium	TBA
Wests Tigers (U21s)	V	Canterbury-Bankstown Bulldogs (U21s)	Saturday, 30 May, 12:00pm	Lidcombe Oval	TBA
Melbourne Storm (U21s)	V	Sydney Roosters (U21s)	Saturday, 30 May, 3:00pm	Gosch's Paddock	TBA
Penrith Panthers (U21s)	V	New Zealand Warriors (U21s)	Sunday, 31 May, 11:00am	Parker Street Reserve	TBA
Canberra Raiders (U21s)	V	St George Illawarra Dragons (U21s)	Sunday, 31 May, 11:45am	GIO Stadium	TBA
Kaiviti Silktails (U21s)	BYE	South Sydney Rabbitohs (U21s)
Round 14
Melbourne Storm (U21s)	V	Newcastle Knights (U21s)	Saturday, 6 June, 10:00am	Seabrook Reserve	TBA
Kaiviti Silktails (U21s)	V	Sydney Roosters (U21s)	Saturday, 6 June, 12:00pm	Churchill Park	TBA
Canterbury-Bankstown Bulldogs (U21s)	V	Parramatta Eels (U21s)	Saturday, 6 June, 12:00pm	Belmore Sports Ground	TBA
Manly Warringah Sea Eagles (U21s)	V	South Sydney Rabbitohs (U21s)	Saturday, 6 June, 1:00pm	4 Pines Park	TBA
Cronulla-Sutherland Sharks (U21s)	V	St George Illawarra Dragons (U21s)	Sunday, 7 June, 1:50pm	Ocean Protect Stadium	TBA
Wests Tigers (U21s)	V	Penrith Panthers (U21s)	Sunday, 7 June, 2:00pm	Lidcombe Oval	TBA
Canberra Raiders (U21s)	BYE	New Zealand Warriors (U21s)
Round 15
South Sydney Rabbitohs (U21s)	V	Kaiviti Silktails (U21s)	Saturday, 13 June, 11:45am	Redfern Oval	TBA
Parramatta Eels (U21s)	V	Canberra Raiders (U21s)	Saturday, 13 June, 1:00pm	James Hardie Centre of Excellence	TBA
New Zealand Warriors (U21s)	V	Cronulla-Sutherland Sharks (U21s)	Saturday, 13 June, 2:45pm	Go Media Stadium	TBA
Wests Tigers (U21s)	V	Sydney Roosters (U21s)	Sunday, 14 June, 11:00am	Lidcombe Oval	TBA
Canterbury-Bankstown Bulldogs (U21s)	BYE	St George Illawarra Dragons (U21s)
Newcastle Knights (U21s)	BYE	Penrith Panthers (U21s)
Manly Warringah Sea Eagles (U21s)	BYE	Melbourne Storm (U21s)
Round 16
Wests Tigers (U21s)	V	Manly Warringah Sea Eagles (U21s)	Saturday, 20 June, 12:00pm	Lidcombe Oval	TBA
Kaiviti Silktails (U21s)	V	Penrith Panthers (U21s)	Saturday, 20 June, 12:00pm	Churchill Park	TBA
Newcastle Knights (U21s)	V	St George Illawarra Dragons (U21s)	Saturday, 20 June, 1:00pm	Knights Centre of Excellence	TBA
New Zealand Warriors (U21s)	V	Canterbury-Bankstown Bulldogs (U21s)	Sunday, 21 June, 12:00pm	Trusts Stadium	TBA
Melbourne Storm (U21s)	V	Canberra Raiders (U21s)	Sunday, 21 June, 12:00pm	Gosch's Paddock	TBA
Sydney Roosters (U21s)	V	Cronulla-Sutherland Sharks (U21s)	Sunday, 21 June, 12:00pm	Wentworth Park	TBA
Parramatta Eels (U21s)	BYE	South Sydney Rabbitohs (U21s)
Round 17
Canberra Raiders (U21s)	V	New Zealand Warriors (U21s)	Saturday, 27 June, 12:30pm	Dudley Chesham Sports Ground	TBA
Parramatta Eels (U21s)	V	Melbourne Storm (U21s)	Saturday, 27 June, 1:00pm	James Hardie Centre of Excellence	TBA
Manly Warringah Sea Eagles (U21s)	V	Canterbury-Bankstown Bulldogs (U21s)	Saturday, 27 June, 5:00pm	4 Pines Park	TBA
St George Illawarra Dragons (U21s)	V	Penrith Panthers (U21s)	Sunday, 28 June, 11:00am	Collegians Sports Stadium	TBA
Sydney Roosters (U21s)	V	South Sydney Rabbitohs (U21s)	Sunday, 28 June, 12:30pm	Wentworth Park	TBA
Newcastle Knights (U21s)	V	Kaiviti Silktails (U21s)	Sunday, 28 June, 1:35pm	McDonald Jones Stadium	TBA
Cronulla-Sutherland Sharks (U21s)	BYE	Wests Tigers (U21s)
Round 18
Cronulla-Sutherland Sharks (U21s)	V	Kaiviti Silktails (U21s)	Saturday, 4 July, 11:00am	Ocean Protect Stadium	TBA
Penrith Panthers (U21s)	V	South Sydney Rabbitohs (U21s)	Saturday, 4 July, 11:00am	Parker Street Reserve	TBA
St George Illawarra Dragons (U21s)	V	Wests Tigers (U21s)	Saturday, 4 July, 11:00am	Collegians Sports Stadium	TBA
Parramatta Eels (U21s)	V	Manly Warringah Sea Eagles (U21s)	Sunday, 5 July, 4:00pm	James Hardie Centre of Excellence	TBA
Canterbury-Bankstown Bulldogs (U21s)	BYE	Newcastle Knights (U21s)
Canberra Raiders (U21s)	BYE	Sydney Roosters (U21s)
Melbourne Storm (U21s)	BYE	New Zealand Warriors (U21s)
Round 19
South Sydney Rabbitohs (U21s)	V	Newcastle Knights (U21s)	Saturday, 11 July, 11:45am	Redfern Oval	TBA
Kaiviti Silktails (U21s)	V	Manly Warringah Sea Eagles (U21s)	Saturday, 11 July, 12:00pm	Churchill Park	TBA
Wests Tigers (U21s)	V	New Zealand Warriors (U21s)	Saturday, 11 July, 12:00pm	Lidcombe Oval	TBA
Sydney Roosters (U21s)	V	Parramatta Eels (U21s)	Sunday, 12 July, 12:30pm	Wentworth Park	TBA
Melbourne Storm (U21s)	V	Cronulla-Sutherland Sharks (U21s)	Sunday, 12 July, 3:45pm	AAMI Park	TBA
Canterbury-Bankstown Bulldogs (U21s)	BYE	Canberra Raiders (U21s)
St George Illawarra Dragons (U21s)	BYE	Penrith Panthers (U21s)
Round 20
Cronulla-Sutherland Sharks (U21s)	V	Newcastle Knights (U21s)	Friday, 17 July, 3:45pm	Ocean Protect Stadium	TBA
Manly Warringah Sea Eagles (U21s)	V	Penrith Panthers (U21s)	Saturday, 18 July, 11:00am	4 Pines Park	TBA
Canterbury-Bankstown Bulldogs (U21s)	V	Wests Tigers (U21s)	Saturday, 18 July, 12:00pm	Belmore Sports Ground	TBA
Canberra Raiders (U21s)	V	South Sydney Rabbitohs (U21s)	Saturday, 18 July, TBA	Raiders Belconnen	TBA
New Zealand Warriors (U21s)	V	St George Illawarra Dragons (U21s)	Sunday, 19 July, 12:00pm	Trusts Stadium	TBA
Sydney Roosters (U21s)	V	Melbourne Storm (U21s)	Sunday, 19 July, 12:30pm	Wentworth Park	TBA
Kaiviti Silktails (U21s)	BYE	Parramatta Eels (U21s)
Round 21
Parramatta Eels (U21s)	V	Penrith Panthers (U21s)	Friday, 24 July, 6:30pm	James Hardie Centre of Excellence	TBA
Canterbury-Bankstown Bulldogs (U21s)	V	New Zealand Warriors (U21s)	Saturday, 25 July, 11:00am	Belmore Sports Ground	TBA
South Sydney Rabbitohs (U21s)	V	Melbourne Storm (U21s)	Saturday, 25 July, 11:45am	Redfern Oval	TBA
Newcastle Knights (U21s)	V	Sydney Roosters (U21s)	Saturday, 25 July, 12:00pm	Knights Centre of Excellence	TBA
Canberra Raiders (U21s)	V	Wests Tigers (U21s)	Saturday, 25 July, TBA	Raiders Belconnen	TBA
Manly Warringah Sea Eagles (U21s)	V	Cronulla-Sutherland Sharks (U21s)	Sunday, 26 July, 11:45am	4 Pines Park	TBA
St George Illawarra Dragons (U21s)	V	Kaiviti Silktails (U21s)	Sunday, 26 July, 11:45am	Jubilee Stadium	TBA
Round 22
Kaiviti Silktails (U21s)	V	Newcastle Knights (U21s)	Saturday, 1 August, 12:00pm	Four R Stadium	TBA
Penrith Panthers (U21s)	V	Canberra Raiders (U21s)	Saturday, 1 August, 12:00pm	Parker Street Reserve	TBA
Melbourne Storm (U21s)	V	Canterbury-Bankstown Bulldogs (U21s)	Saturday, 1 August, 2:00pm	Seabrook Reserve	TBA
Wests Tigers (U21s)	V	Parramatta Eels (U21s)	Sunday, 2 August, 11:00am	Lidcombe Oval	TBA
Cronulla-Sutherland Sharks (U21s)	V	South Sydney Rabbitohs (U21s)	Sunday, 2 August, 11:45am	Ocean Protect Stadium	TBA
Sydney Roosters (U21s)	V	St George Illawarra Dragons (U21s)	Sunday, 2 August, 12:30pm	Wentworth Park	TBA
Manly Warringah Sea Eagles (U21s)	BYE	New Zealand Warriors (U21s)
Round 23
St George Illawarra Dragons (U21s)	V	Cronulla-Sutherland Sharks (U21s)	Saturday, 8 August, 11:00am	Collegians Sports Stadium	TBA
Kaiviti Silktails (U21s)	V	Wests Tigers (U21s)	Saturday, 8 August, 12:00pm	Churchill Park	TBA
New Zealand Warriors (U21s)	V	Penrith Panthers (U21s)	Saturday, 8 August, 12:00pm	Trusts Stadium	TBA
South Sydney Rabbitohs (U21s)	V	Parramatta Eels (U21s)	Saturday, 8 August, 11:45am	Redfern Oval	TBA
Melbourne Storm (U21s)	V	Manly Warringah Sea Eagles (U21s)	Saturday, 8 August, TBA	Seabrook Reserve	TBA
Canberra Raiders (U21s)	V	Newcastle Knights (U21s)	Sunday, 9 August, 11:00am	Raiders Belconnen	TBA
Sydney Roosters (U21s)	V	Canterbury-Bankstown Bulldogs (U21s)	Sunday, 9 August, 12:30pm	Wentworth Park	TBA
Round 24
Penrith Panthers (U21s)	V	Sydney Roosters (U21s)	Friday, 14 August, 7:30pm	Parker Street Reserve	TBA
Manly Warringah Sea Eagles (U21s)	V	New Zealand Warriors (U21s)	Saturday, 15 August, 11:00am	4 Pines Park	TBA
Kaiviti Silktails (U21s)	V	Parramatta Eels (U21s)	Saturday, 15 August, 12:00pm	TBA	TBA
Canterbury-Bankstown Bulldogs (U21s)	V	South Sydney Rabbitohs (U21s)	Saturday, 15 August, 12:00pm	Belmore Sports Ground	TBA
Cronulla-Sutherland Sharks (U21s)	V	Canberra Raiders (U21s)	Saturday, 15 August, 12:45pm	Ocean Protect Stadium	TBA
Wests Tigers (U21s)	V	St George Illawarra Dragons (U21s)	Sunday, 16 August, 11:00am	Lidcombe Oval	TBA
Newcastle Knights (U21s)	BYE	Melbourne Storm (U21s)
Round 25
Melbourne Storm (U21s)	V	Penrith Panthers (U21s)	Friday, 21 August, 3:00pm	Seabrook Reserve	TBA
Newcastle Knights (U21s)	V	Manly Warringah Sea Eagles (U21s)	Saturday, 22 August, 10:00am	Knights Centre of Excellence	TBA
St George Illawarra Dragons (U21s)	V	Canterbury-Bankstown Bulldogs (U21s)	Saturday, 22 August, 11:00am	Collegians Sports Stadium	TBA
South Sydney Rabbitohs (U21s)	V	New Zealand Warriors (U21s)	Saturday, 22 August, 11:15am	Redfern Oval	TBA
Canberra Raiders (U21s)	V	Parramatta Eels (U21s)	Saturday, 22 August, 1:00pm	Seiffert Oval	TBA
Sydney Roosters (U21s)	V	Wests Tigers (U21s)	Sunday, 23 August, 12:30pm	Wentworth Park	TBA
Cronulla-Sutherland Sharks (U21s)	BYE	Kaiviti Silktails (U21s)
Round 26
Kaiviti Silktails (U21s)	V	Melbourne Storm (U21s)	Saturday, 29 August, 12:00pm	Churchill Park	TBA
New Zealand Warriors (U21s)	V	Newcastle Knights (U21s)	Saturday, 29 August, 12:00pm	Trusts Stadium	TBA
Penrith Panthers (U21s)	V	Canterbury-Bankstown Bulldogs (U21s)	Saturday, 29 August, 12:00pm	Parker Street Reserve	TBA
Wests Tigers (U21s)	V	South Sydney Rabbitohs (U21s)	Saturday, 29 August, 12:00pm	Lidcombe Oval	TBA
Manly Warringah Sea Eagles (U21s)	V	St George Illawarra Dragons (U21s)	Sunday, 30 August, 12:00pm	Sydney Academy of Sport	TBA
Parramatta Eels (U21s)	V	Cronulla-Sutherland Sharks (U21s)	Sunday, 30 August, 2:00pm	James Hardie Centre of Excellence	TBA
Canberra Raiders (U21s)	BYE	Sydney Roosters (U21s)
Finals Series
Qualifying & Elimination Finals
2nd Place	V	3rd Place	5/6 September	TBA	TBA
4th Place	V	5th Place	5/6 September	TBA	TBA
Semi-Finals
1st Place	V	QF Winner	12/13 September	TBA	TBA
QF Loser	V	EF Winner	12/13 September	TBA	TBA
Preliminary Final
Major SF Loser	V	Minor SF Winner	19/20 September	TBA	TBA
Grand Final
Major SF Winner	V	PF Winner	26/27 September	TBA	TBA

=== Grand Final ===
Qualifying & Elimination Finals
2
3
4
5

Major Semi-Final
1
2/3
Minor Semi-Final
2/3
4/5

Preliminary Final
1/2/3
2/3/4/5

Grand Final
1/2/3
1/2/3/4/5

2026 Jersey Flegg Cup Grand Final

26/27 September 2026
TBA

Major SF Winner	v	PF Winner

TBA

== SG Ball Cup ==
2026 UNE SG Ball Cup
- Duration: 7 February – 2/3 May 2026
- Teams: 17
- Broadcast partners: Streaming; BarTV Sports (All Matches)

The SG Ball Cup (named the UNE SG Ball Cup for sponsorship reasons) is a junior representative competition for male players in the older teenage age bracket. It features NSWRL and NRL pathway clubs from across New South Wales and, in some seasons, invited teams from other states or territories. Many players who progress to the Jersey Flegg Cup and beyond first come through the SG Ball system.

=== Teams ===
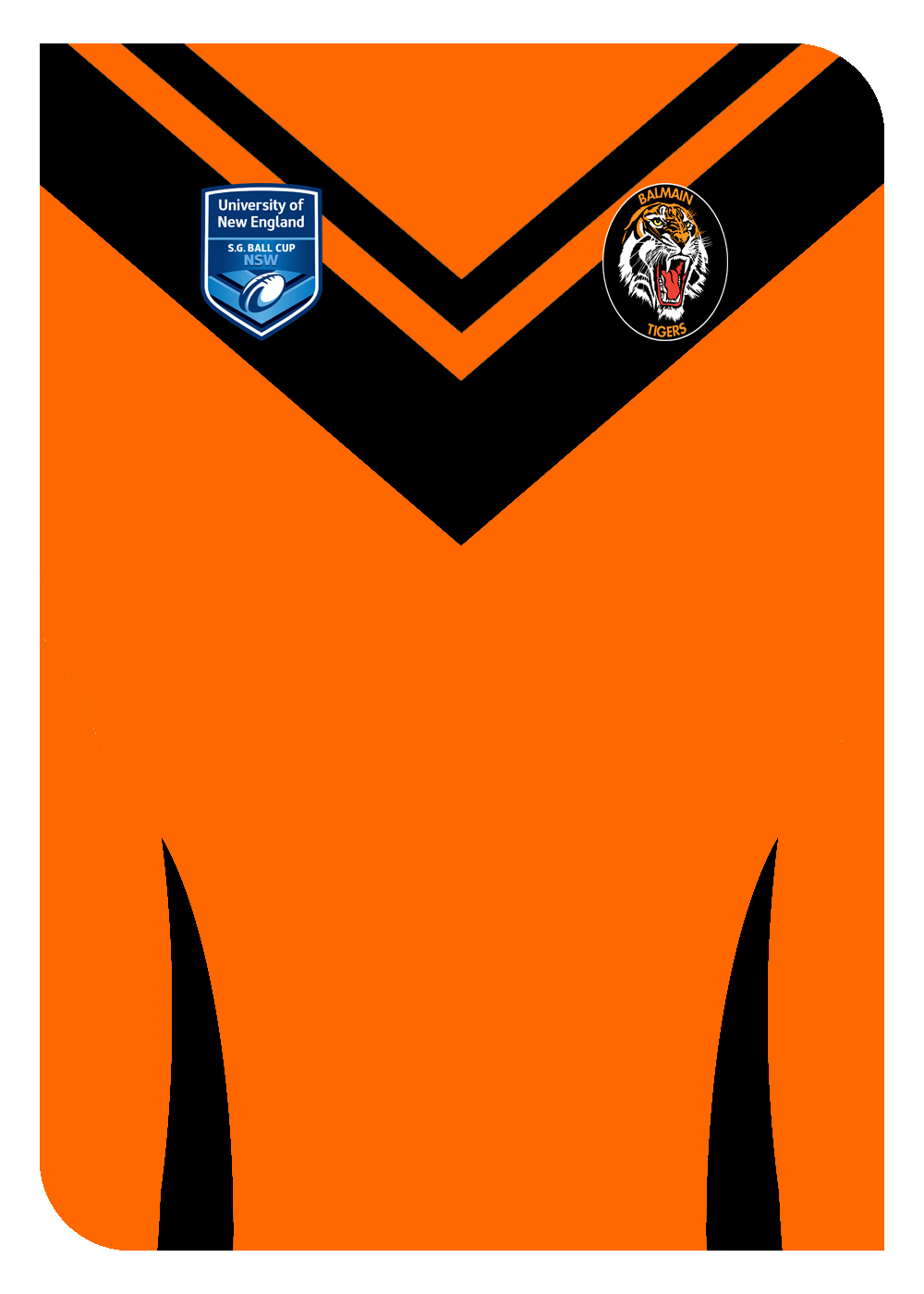
Balmain; Tigers Ground: Leichhardt Oval City/Suburb: Sydney (Leichhardt) Coach: TBA Affiliate: Wests Tigers

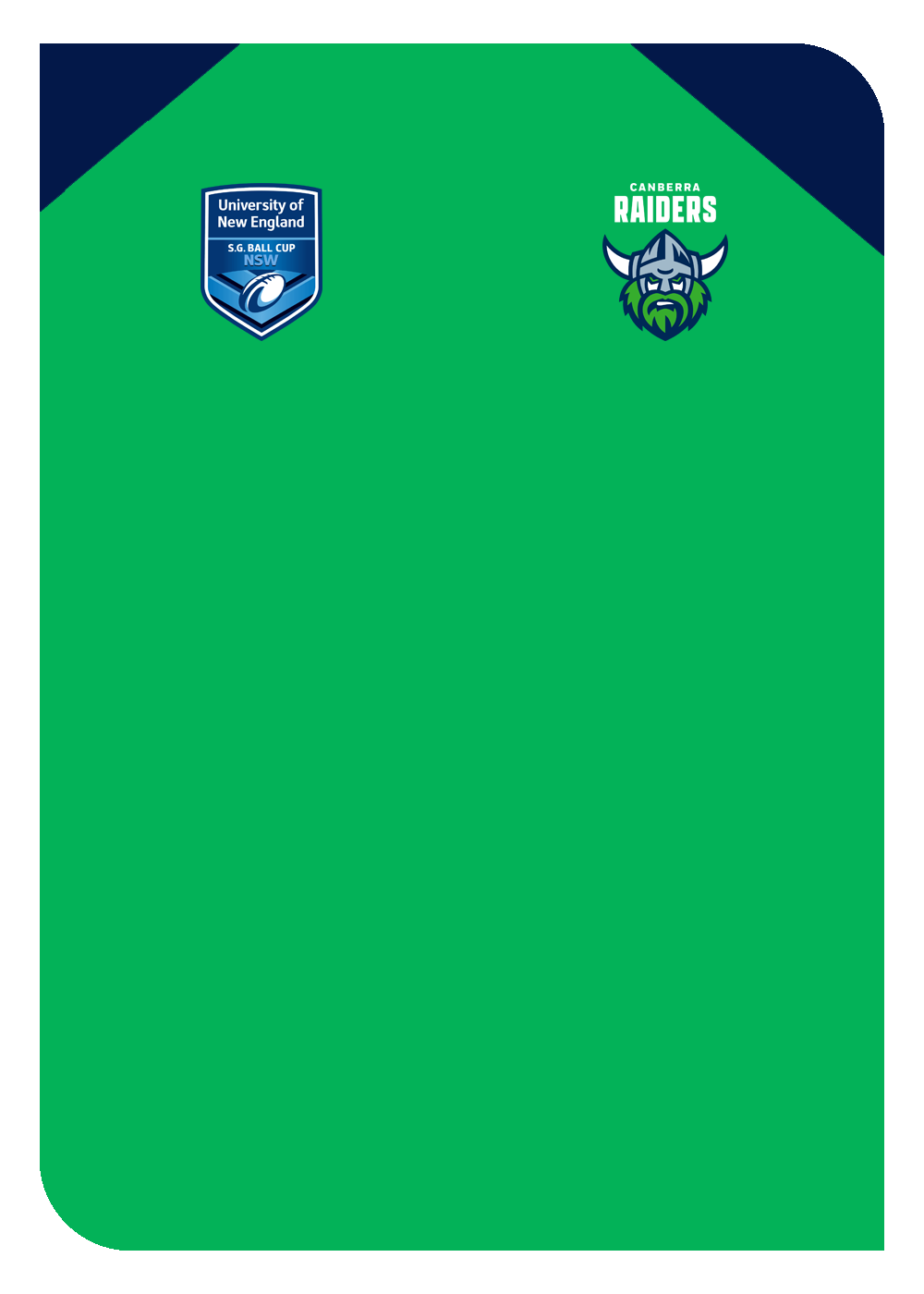
Canberra; Raiders Ground: Raiders Belconnen City/Suburb: Canberra (Holt) Coach: TBA Affiliate: Canberra Raiders

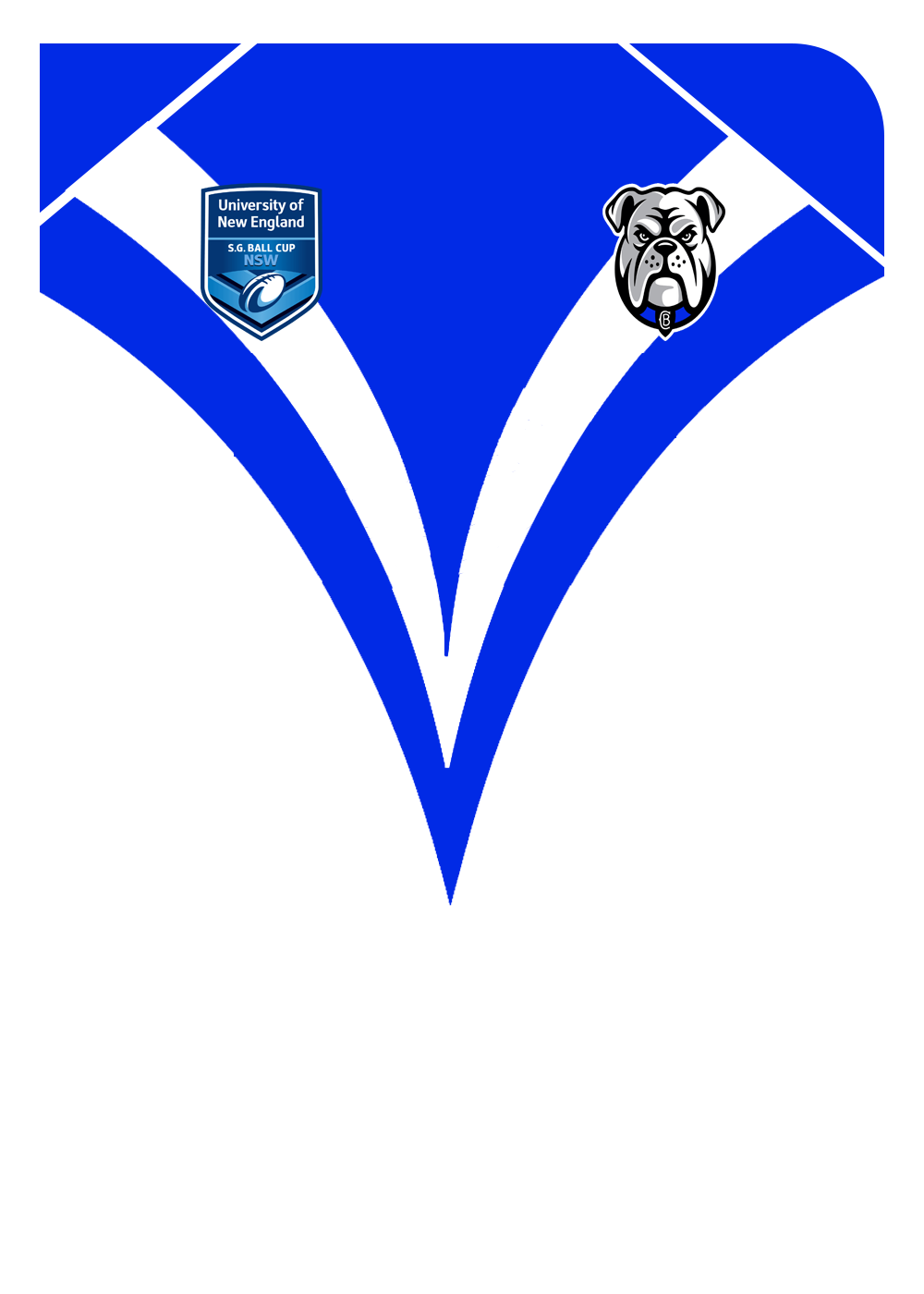
Canterbury-Bankstown; Bulldogs Ground: Belmore Sports Ground City/Suburb: Sydney (Belmore) Coach: TBA Affiliate: Canterbury-Bankstown Bulldogs

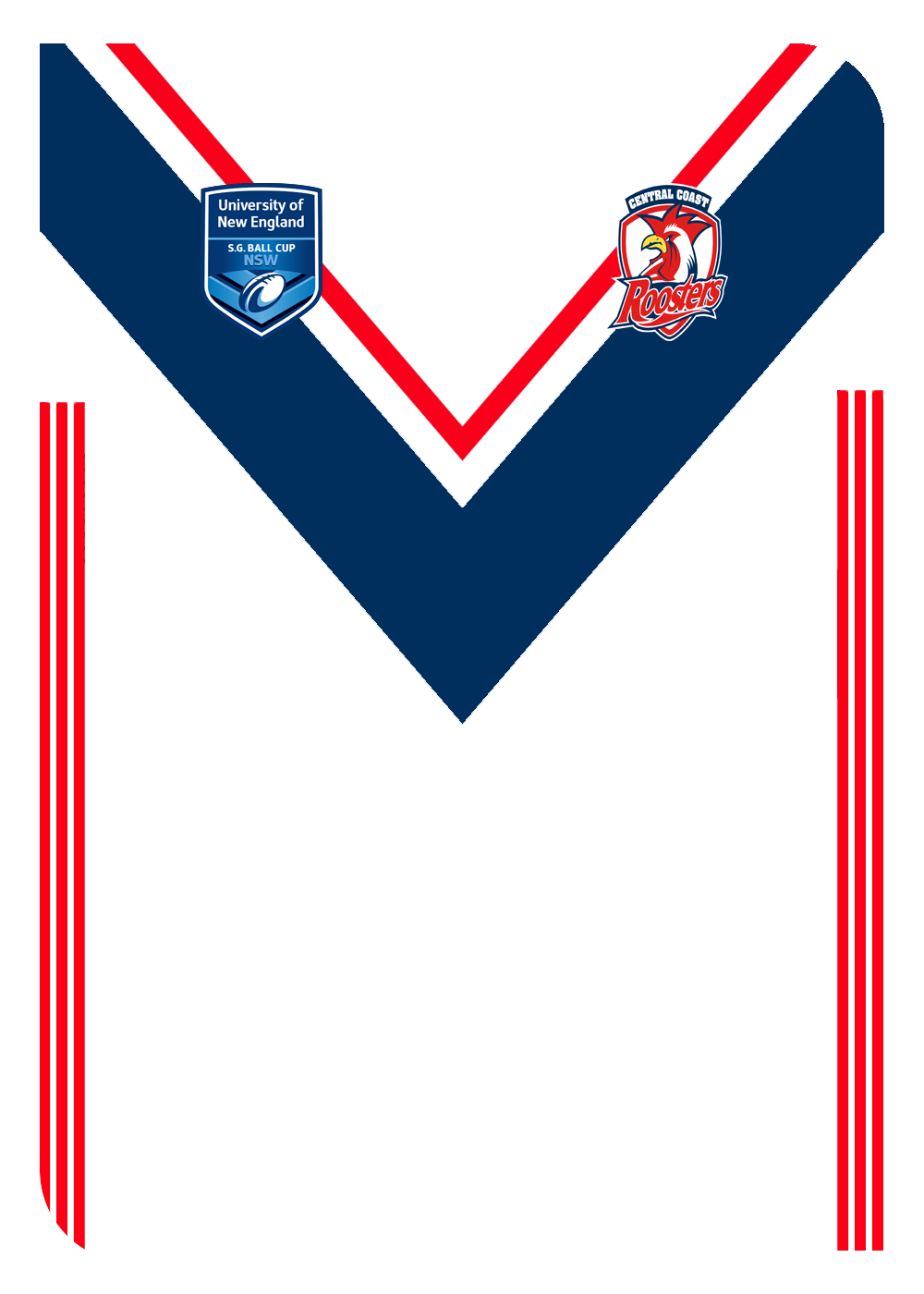
Central Coast; Roosters Ground: Woy Woy Oval City/Suburb: Woy Woy Coach: TBA Affiliate: Sydney Roosters

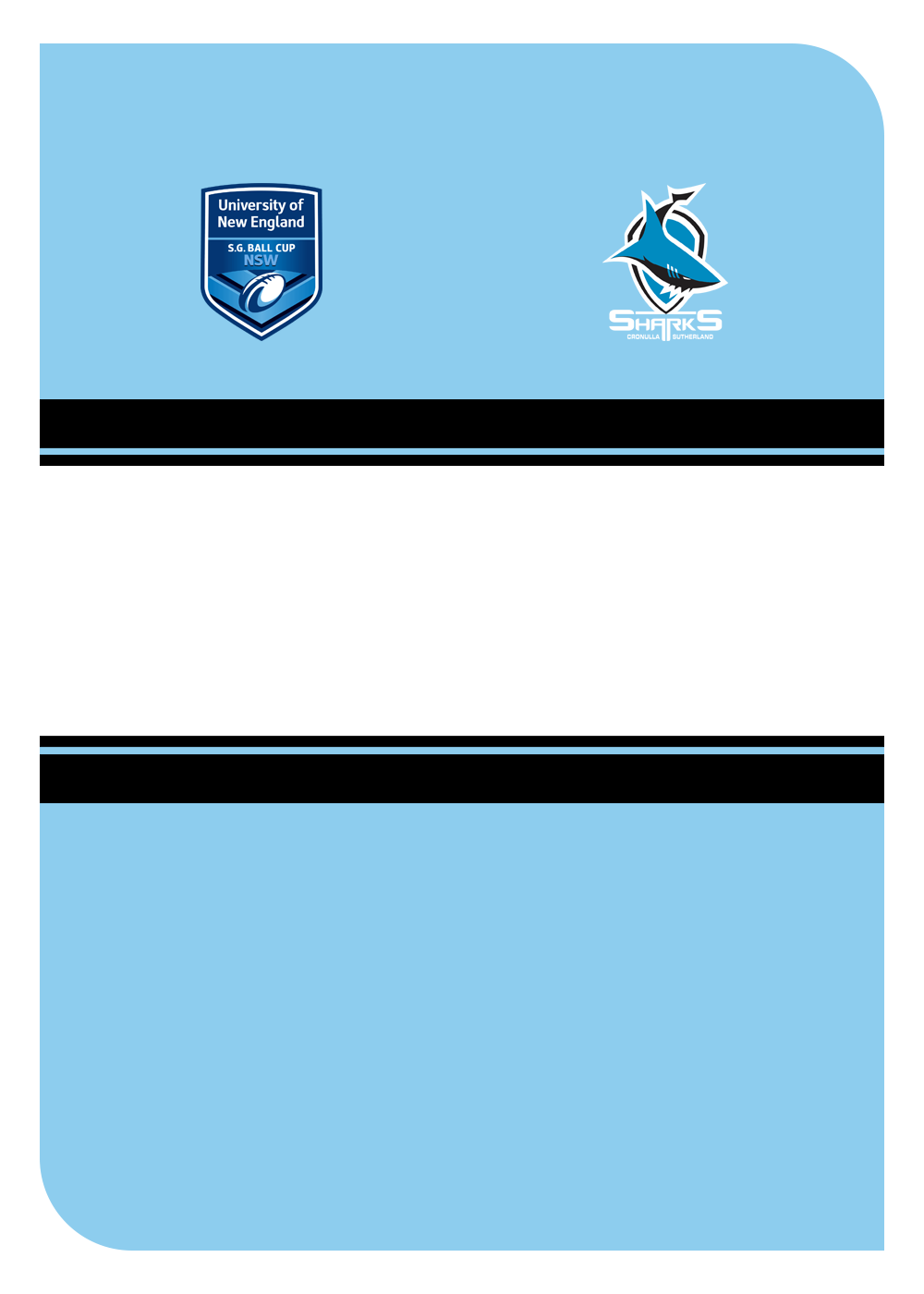
Cronulla-Sutherland; Sharks Ground: Ocean Protect Stadium City/Suburb: Sydney (Woolooware) Coach: TBA Affiliate: Cronulla-Sutherland Sharks

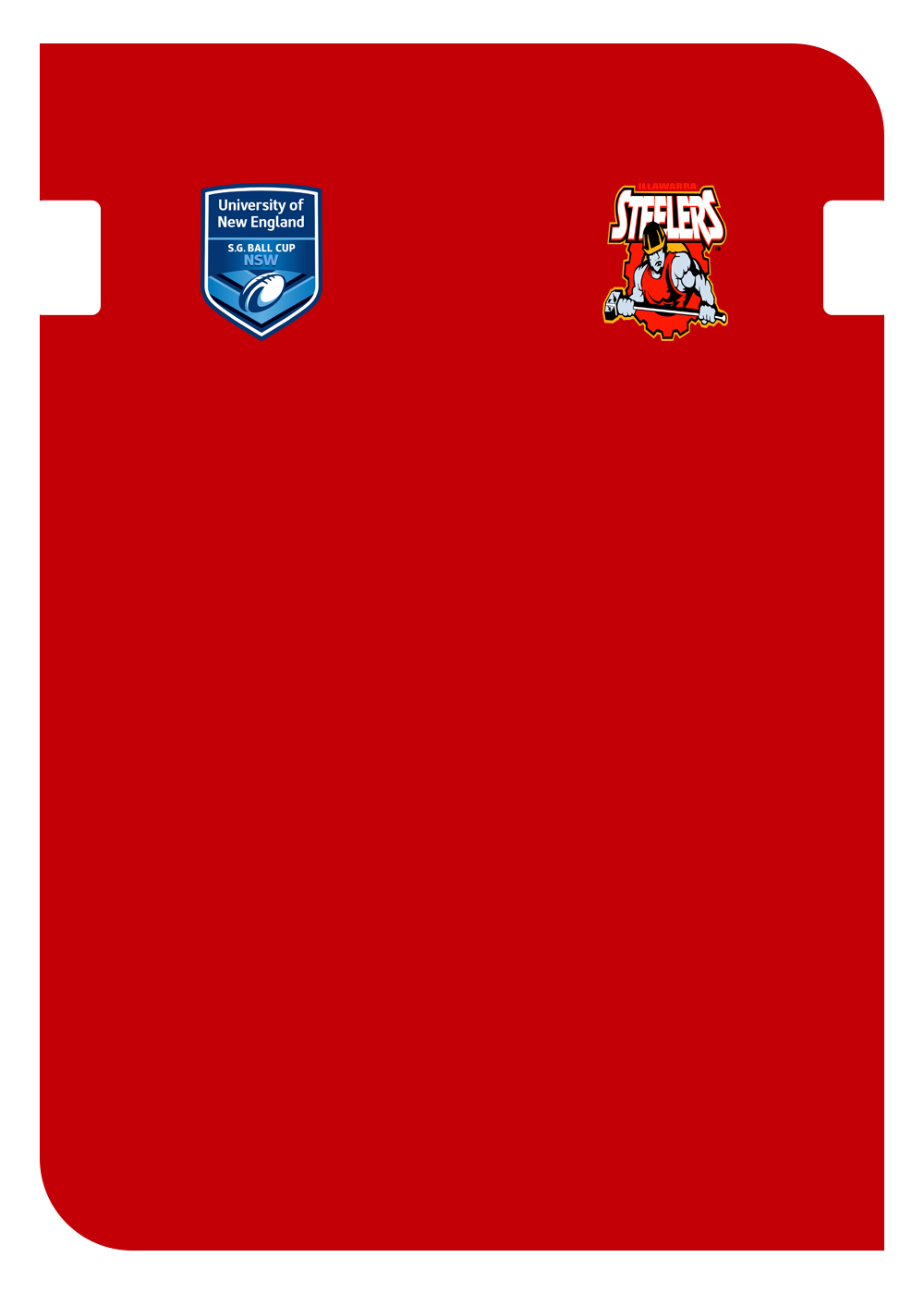
Illawarra; Steelers Ground: Collegians Sports Stadium City/Suburb: Wollongong (Figtree) Coach: TBA Affiliate: St George Illawarra Dragons

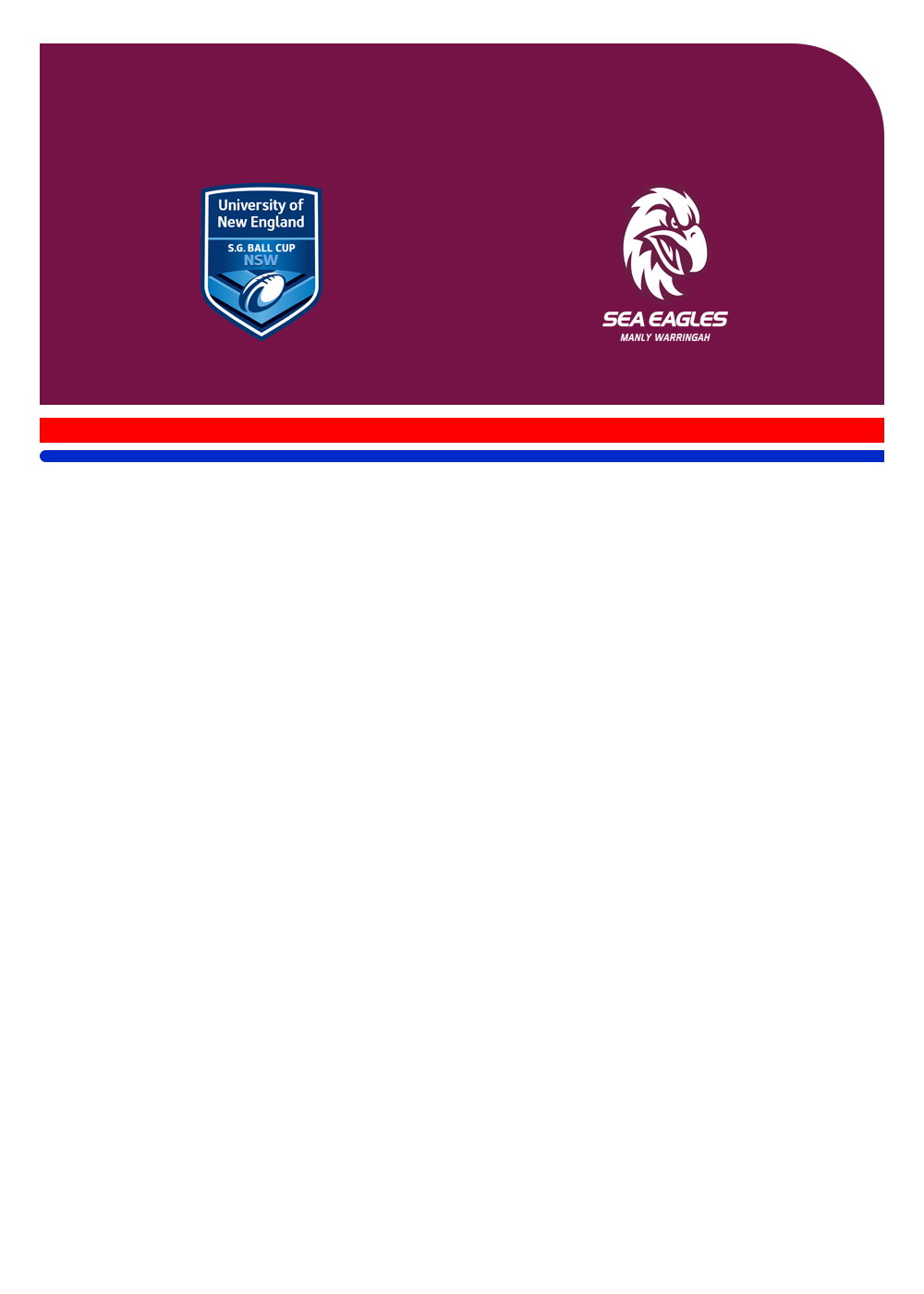
Manly Warringah; Sea Eagles Ground: 4 Pines Park City/Suburb: Sydney (Brookvale) Coach: TBA Affiliate: Manly Warringah Sea Eagles

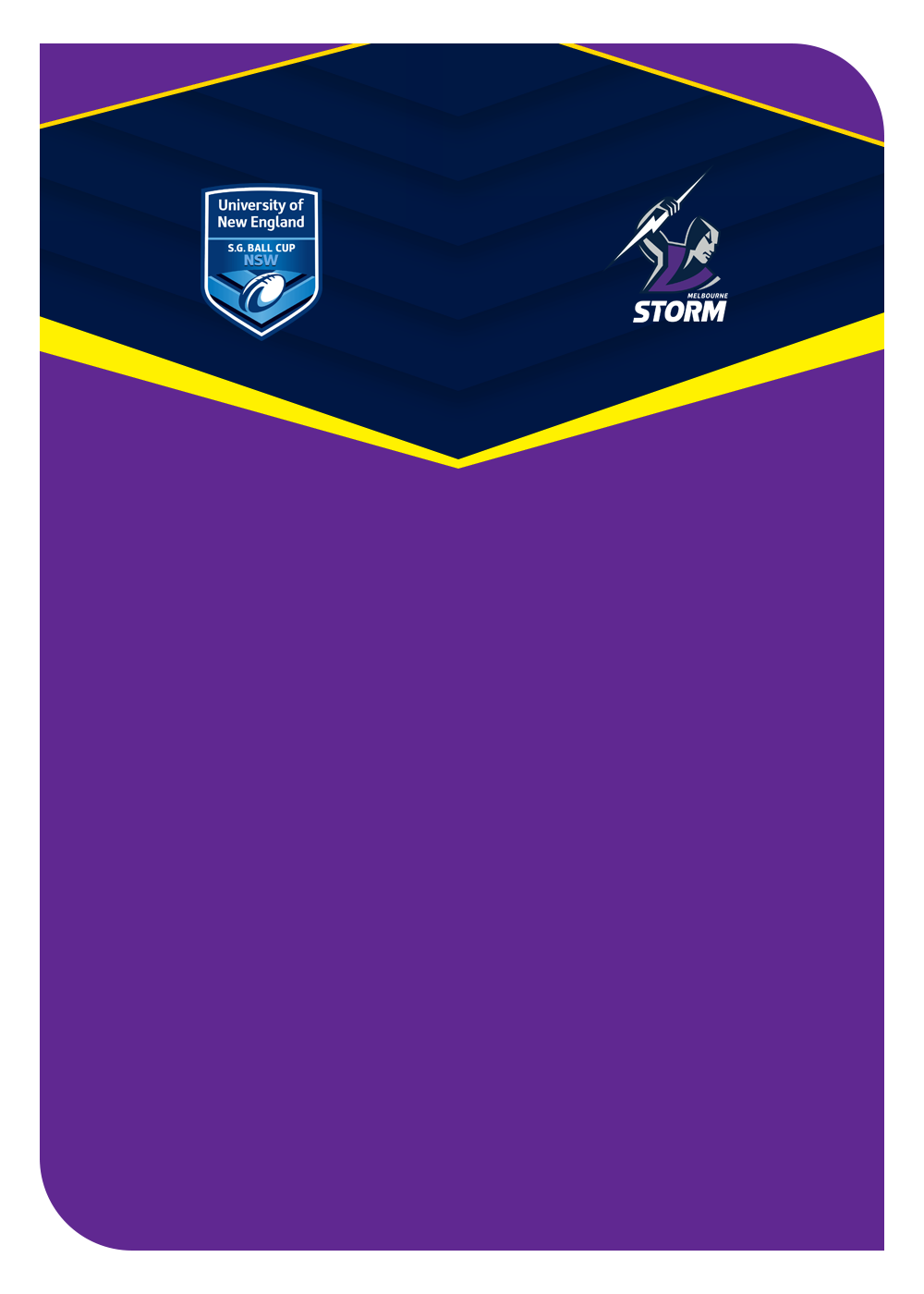
Melbourne; Storm Ground: Seabrook Reserve City/Suburb: Melbourne (Broadmeadows) Coach: TBA Affiliate: Melbourne Storm

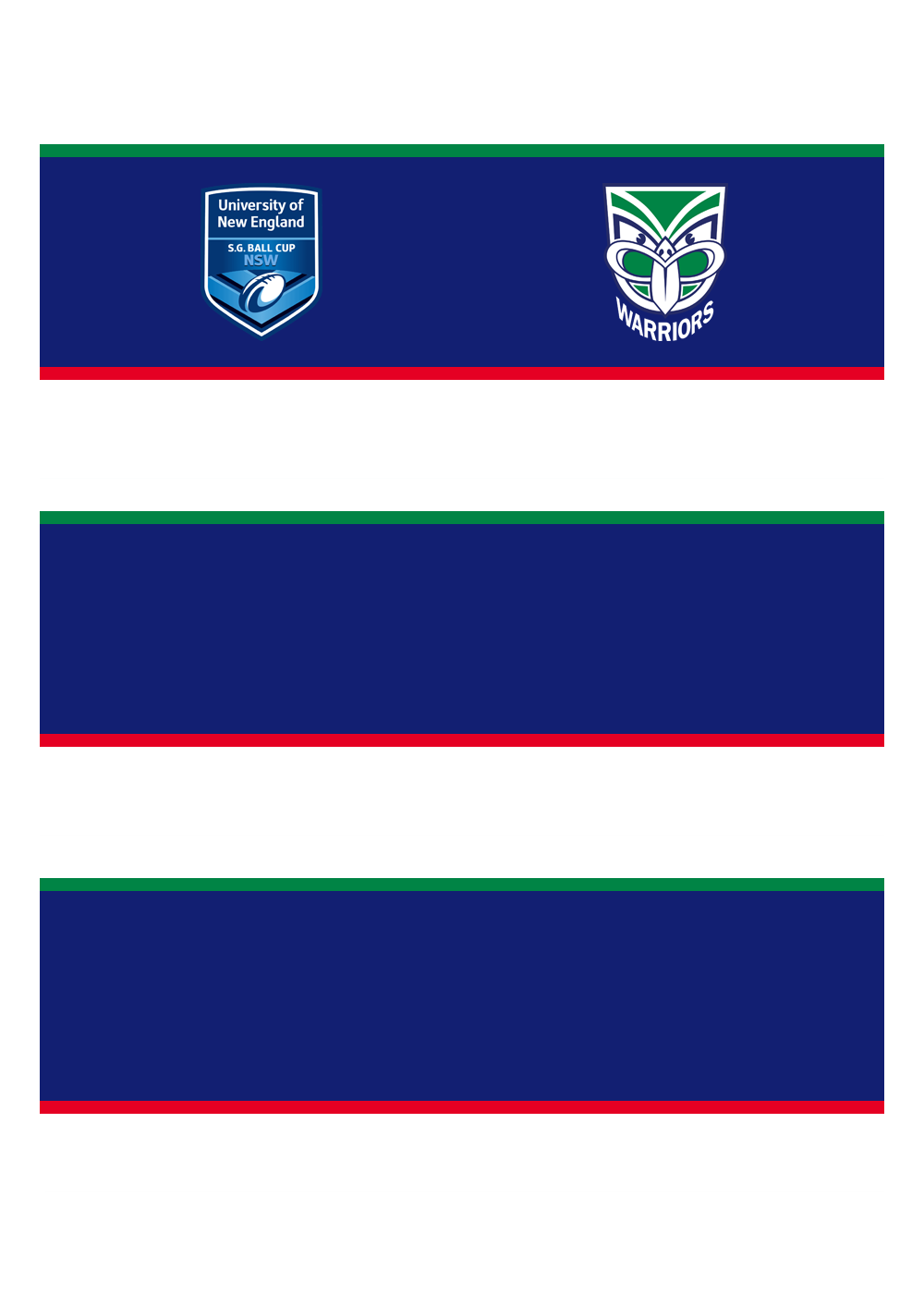
New Zealand; Warriors Ground: Bruce Pulman Park City/Suburb: Auckland (Takanini) Coach: TBA Affiliate: New Zealand Warriors

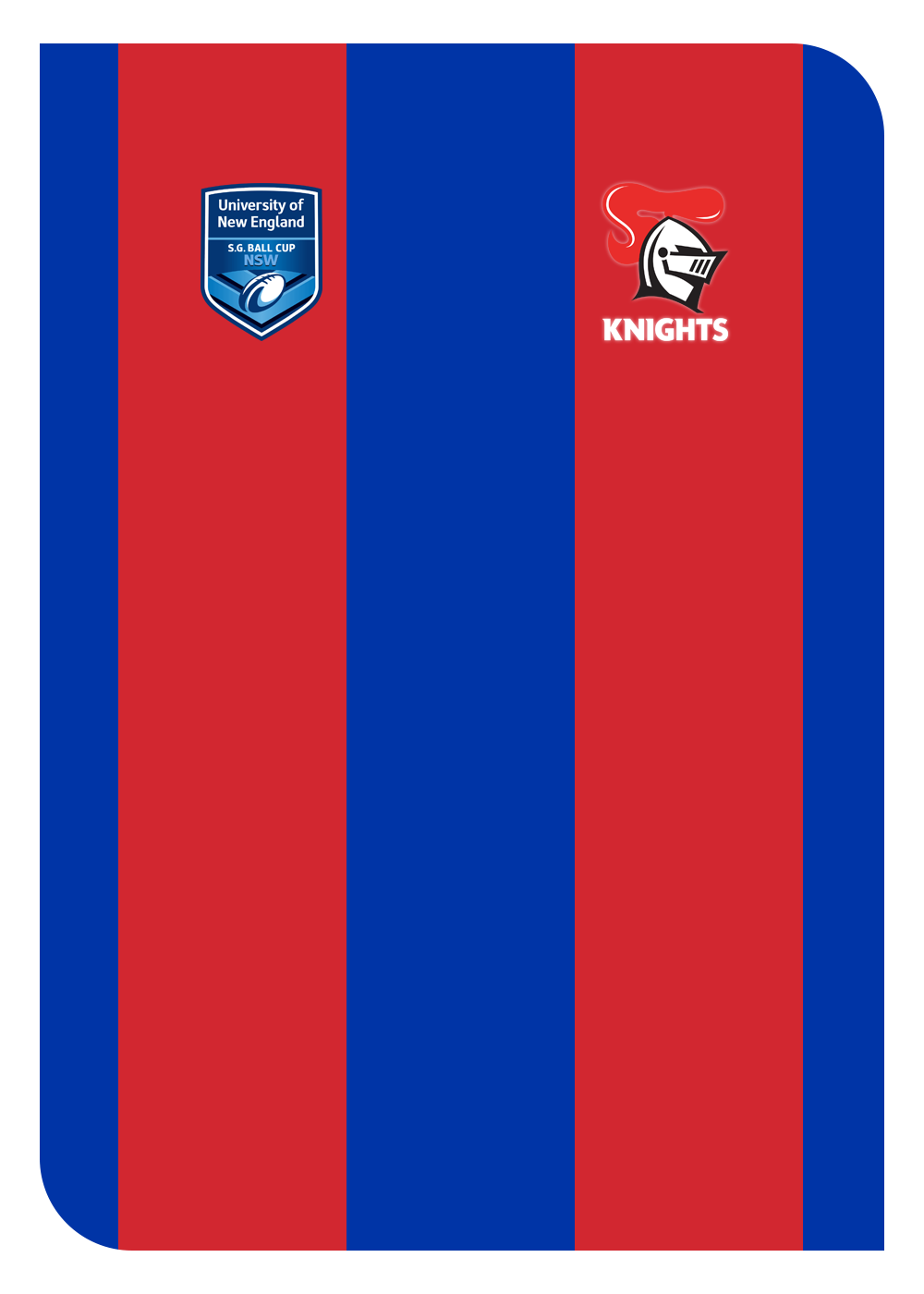
Newcastle; Knights Ground: Lakeside Sporting Complex City/Suburb: Raymond Terrace Coach: TBA Affiliate: Newcastle Knights

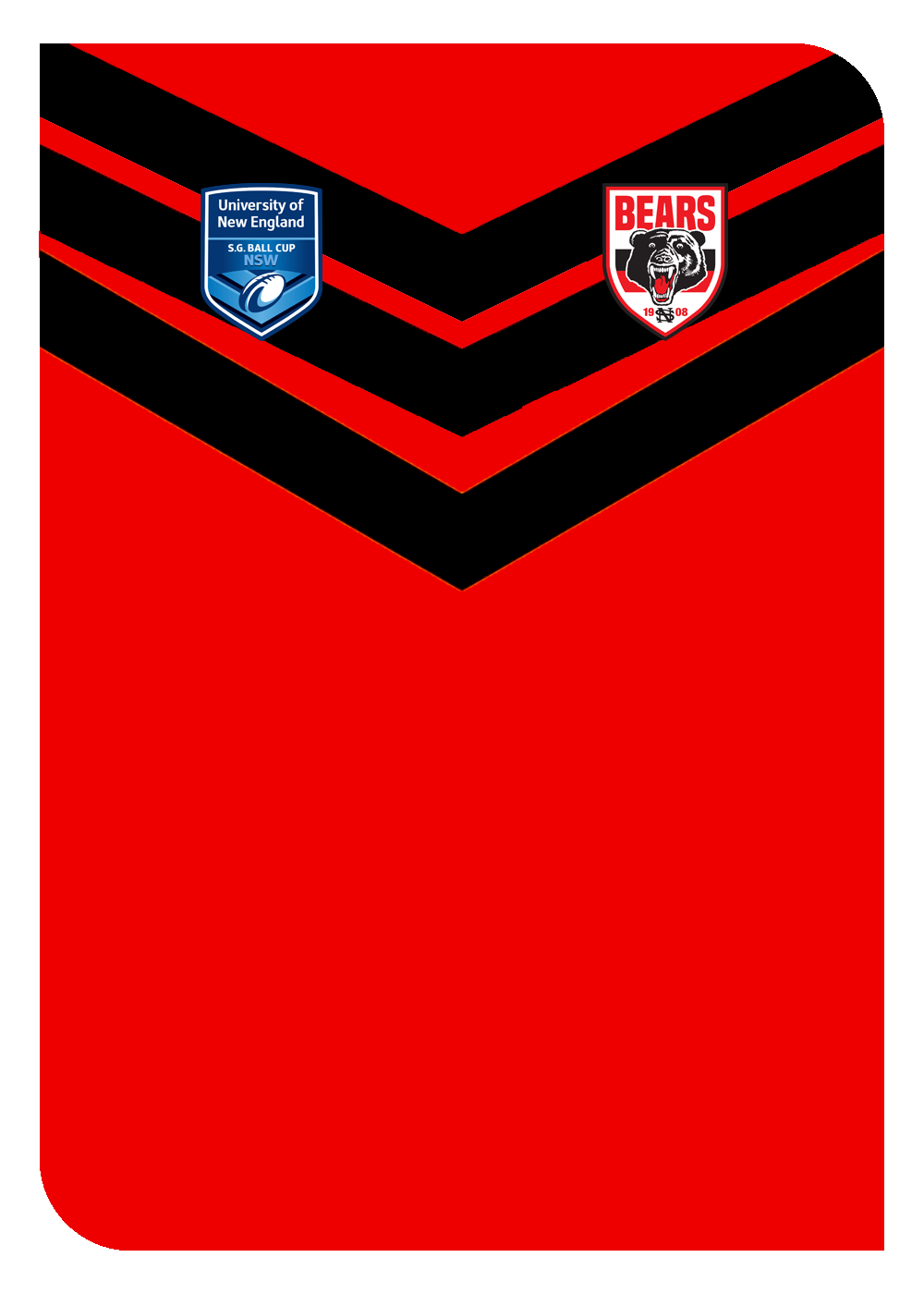
North Sydney; Bears Ground: Hills Grammar Oval City/Suburb: Sydney (Kenthurst) Coach: TBA Affiliate: Perth Bears

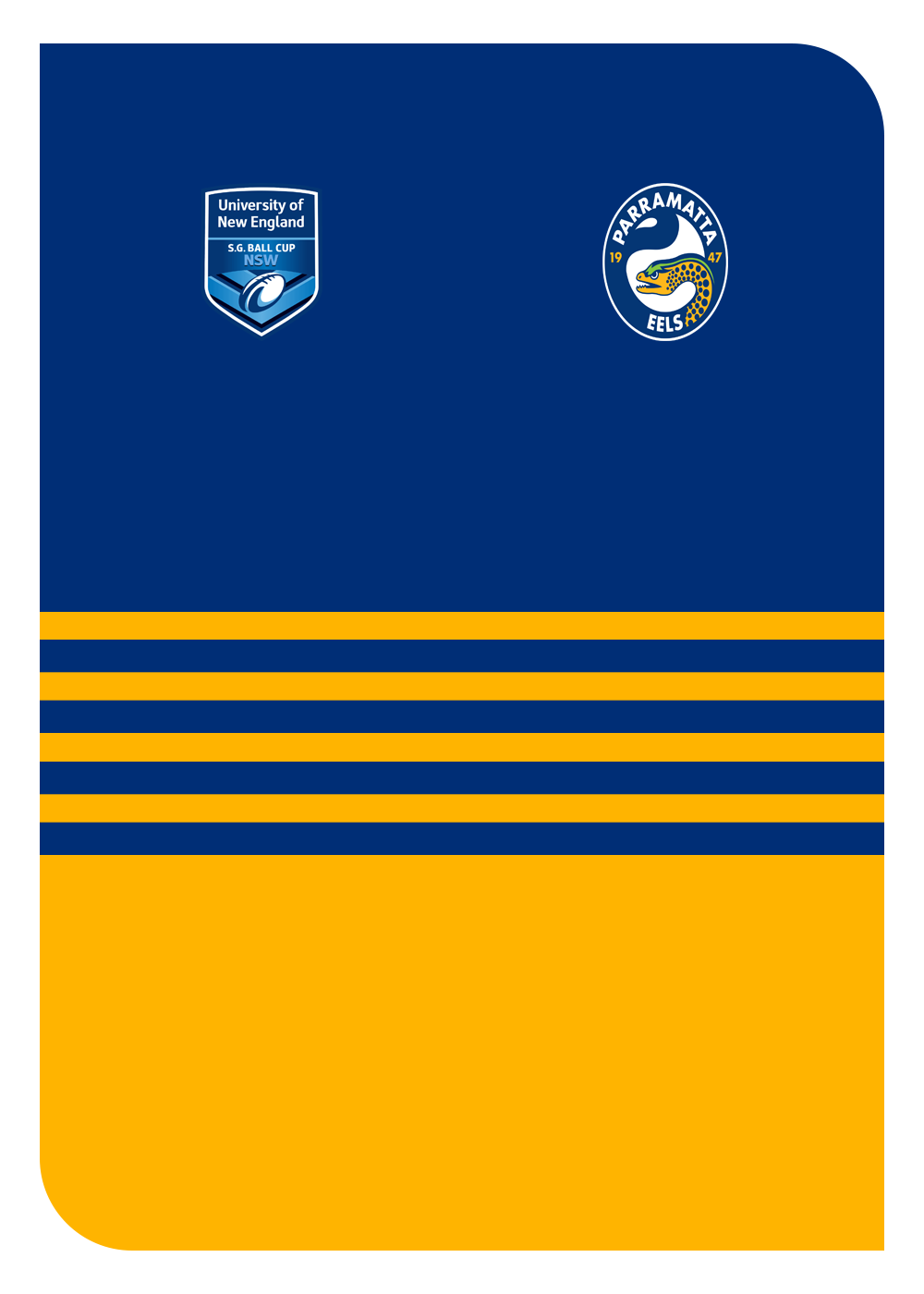
Parramatta; Eels Ground: James Hardie Centre of Excellence City/Suburb: Sydney (Kellyville) Coach: TBA Affiliate: Parramatta Eels

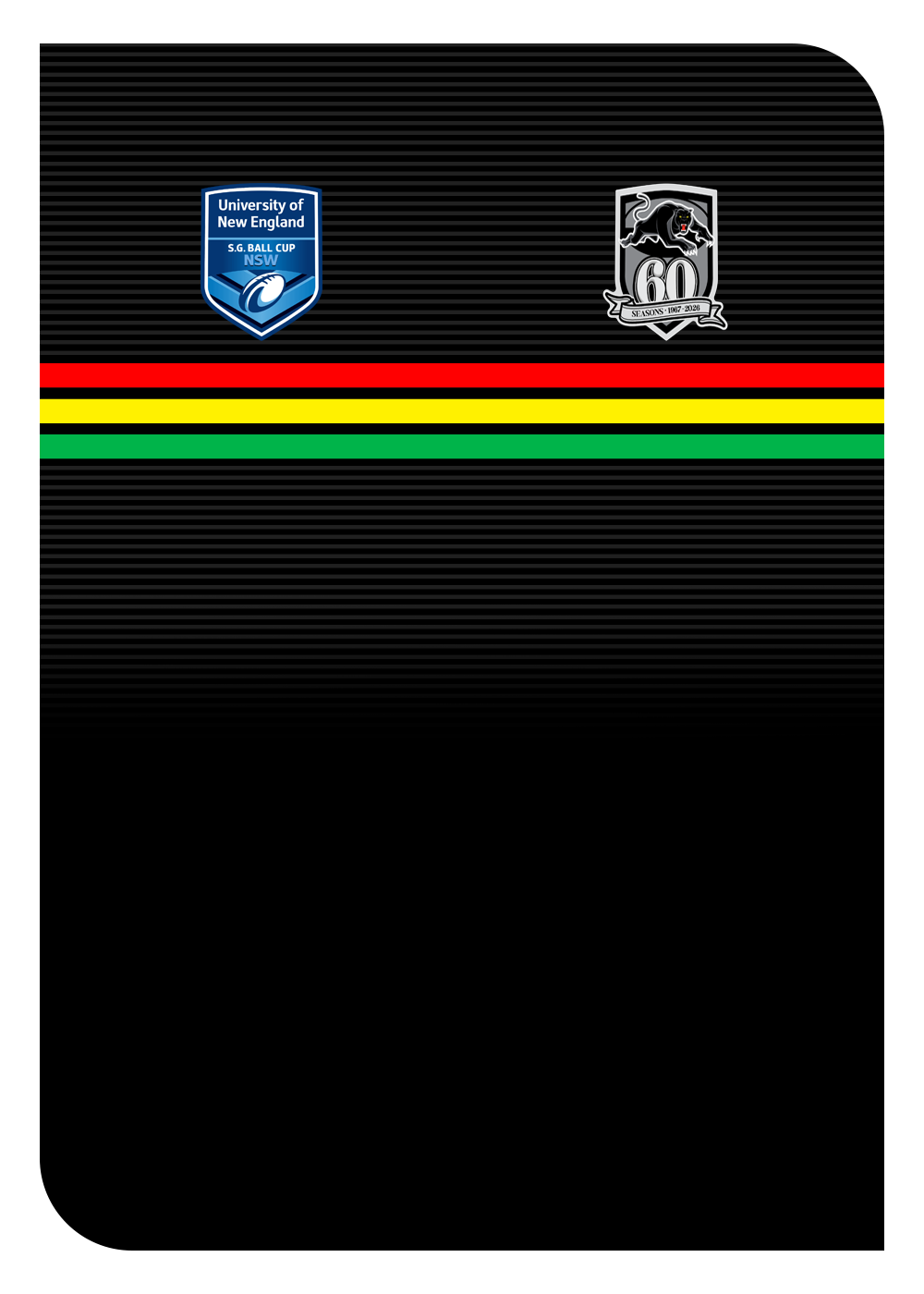
Penrith; Panthers Ground: Parker Street Reserve City/Suburb: Sydney (Penrith) Coach: TBA Affiliate: Penrith Panthers

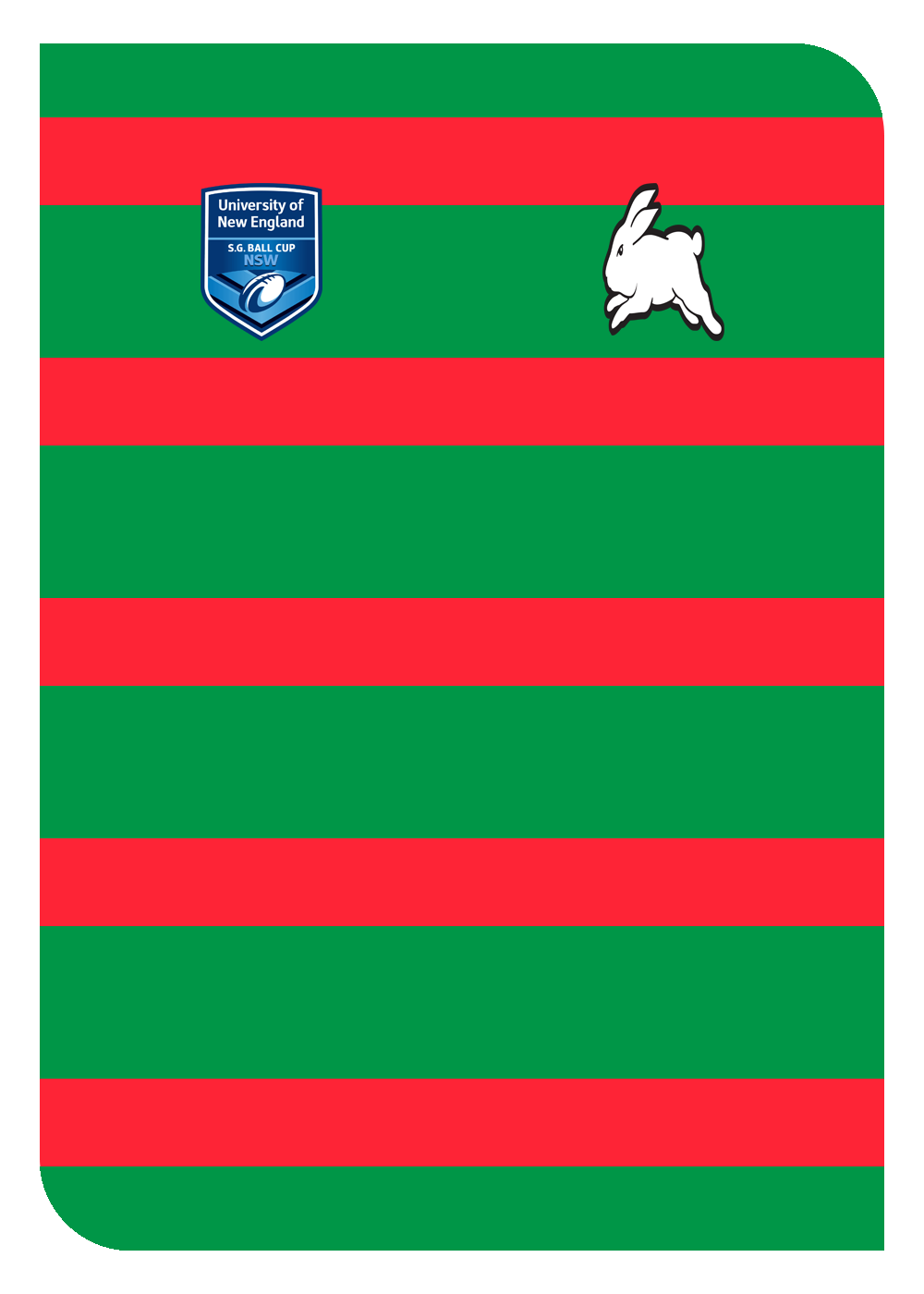
South Sydney; Rabbitohs Ground: Redfern Oval City/Suburb: Sydney (Redfern) Coach: TBA Affiliate: South Sydney Rabbitohs

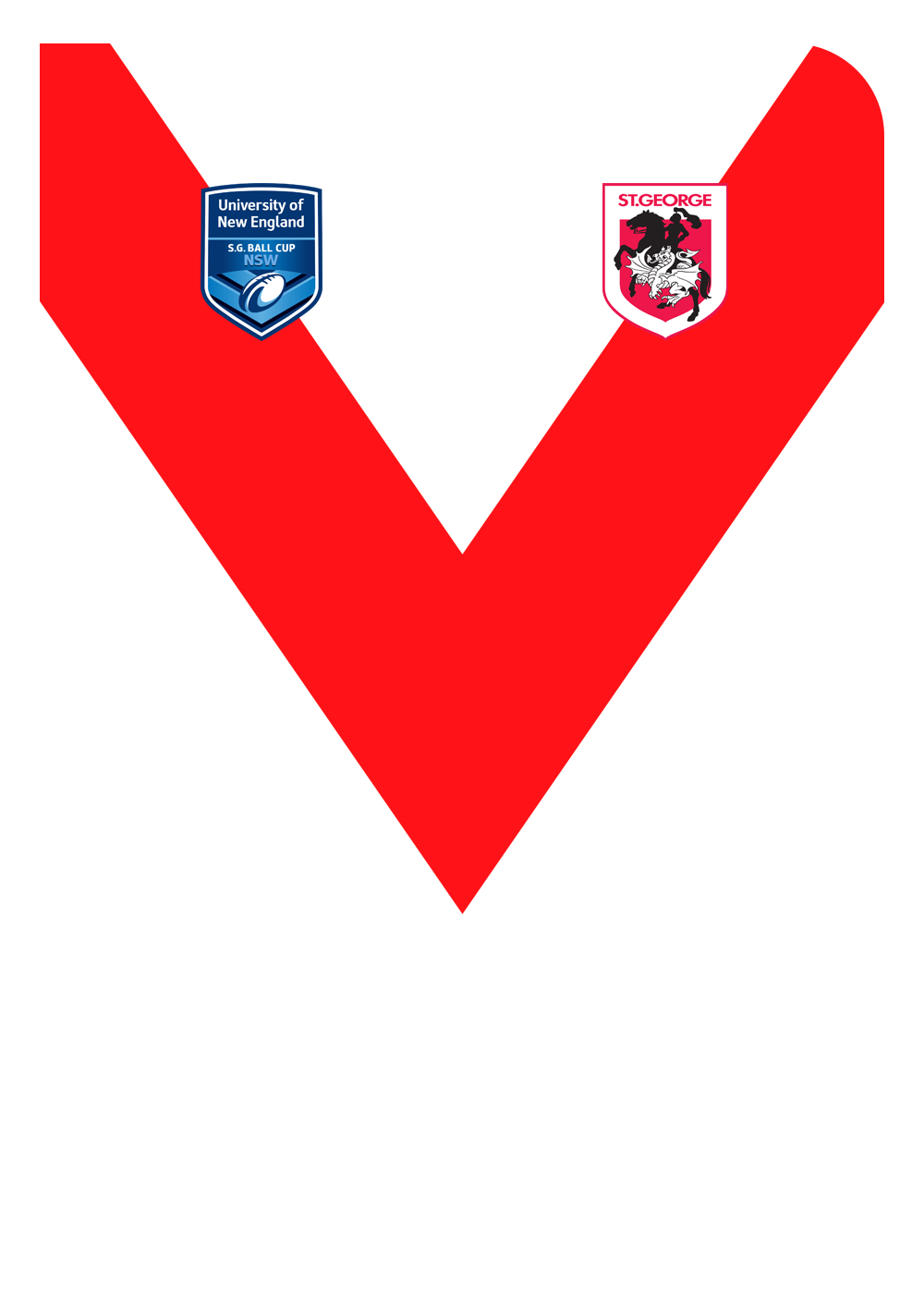
St George; Dragons Ground: Jubilee Stadium City/Suburb: Sydney (Kogarah) Coach: TBA Affiliate: St George Illawarra Dragons

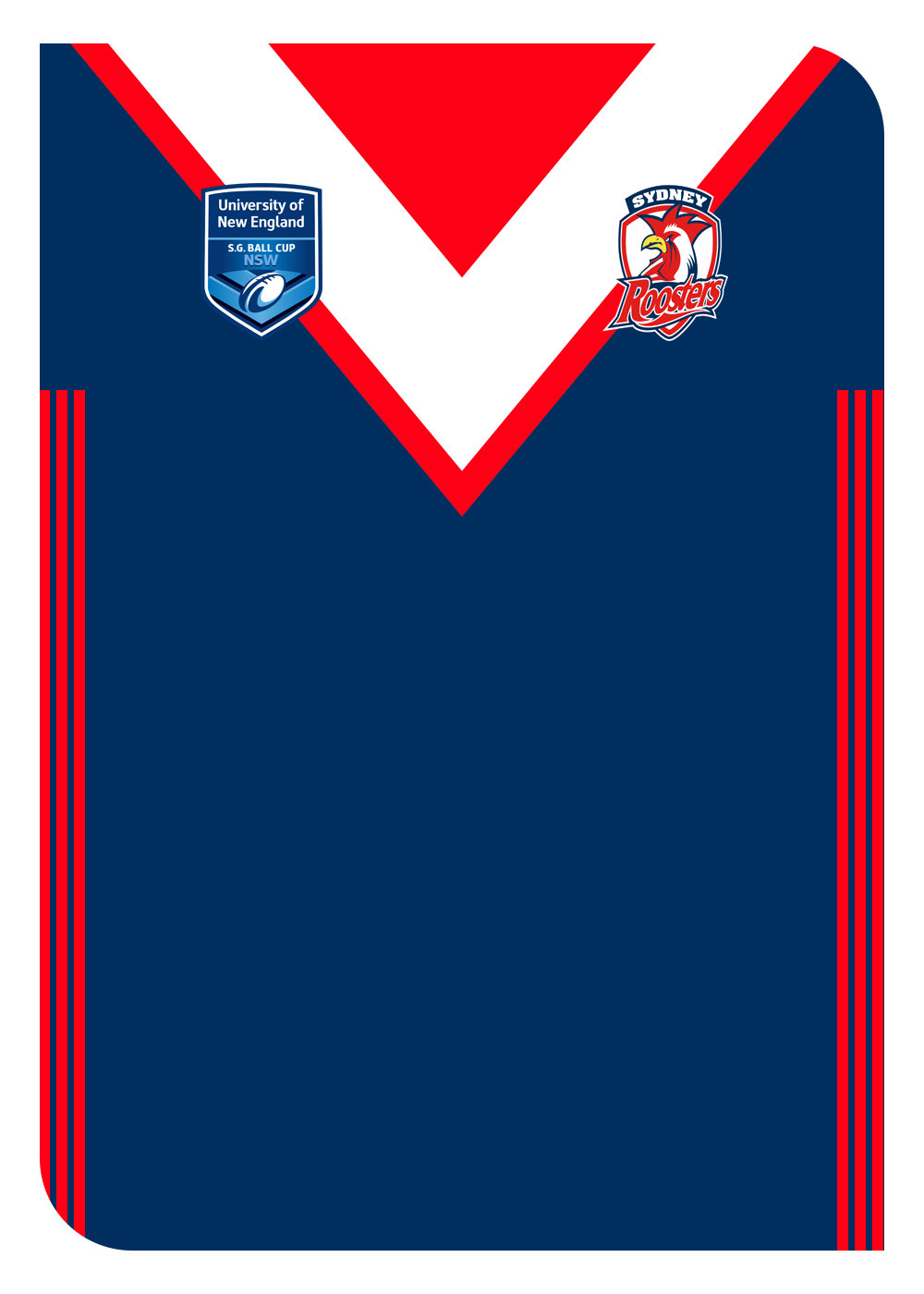
Sydney; Roosters Ground: Henson Park City/Suburb: Sydney (Marrickville) Coach: TBA Affiliate: Sydney Roosters

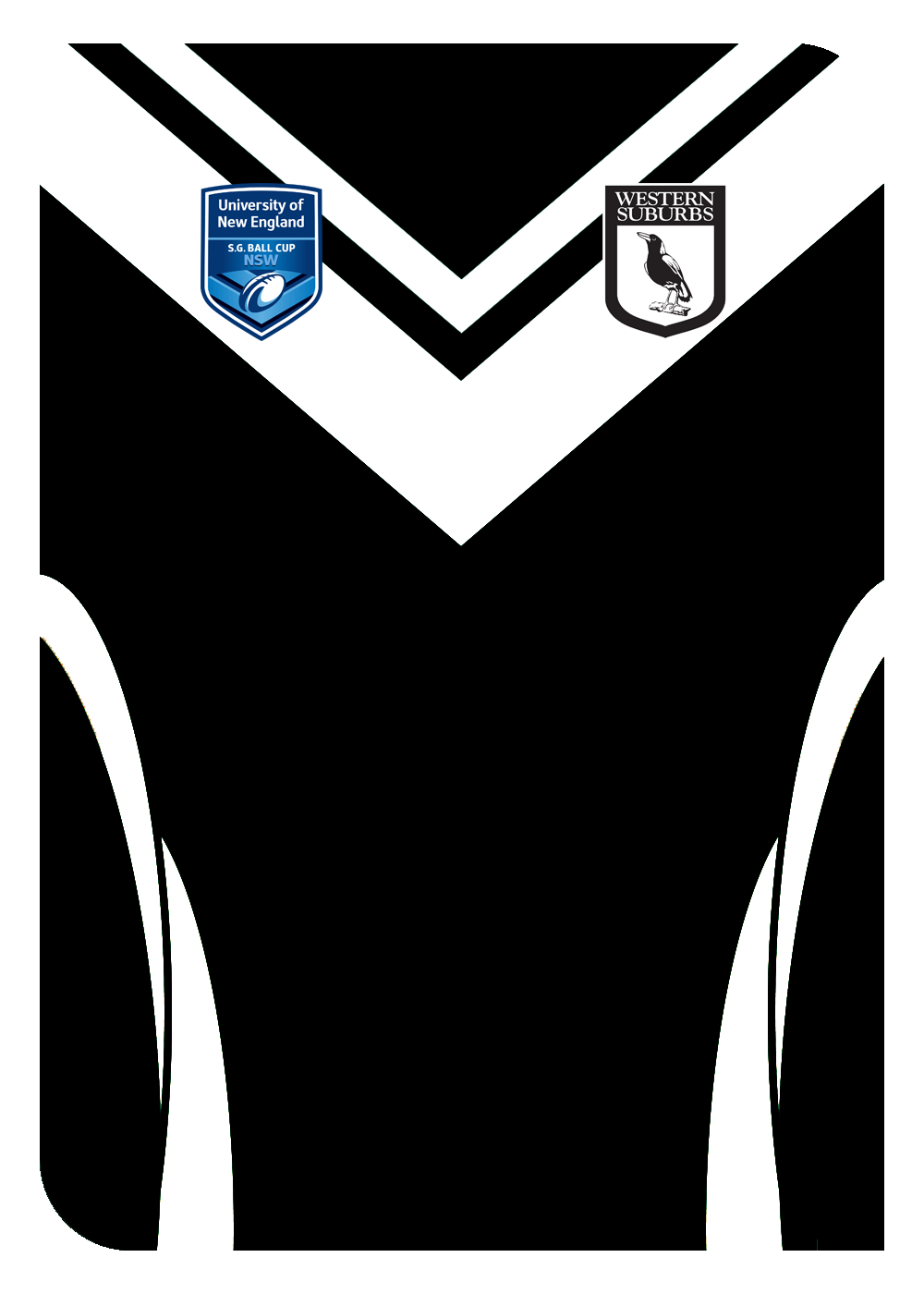
Western Suburbs; Magpies Ground: Kirkham Oval City/Suburb: Sydney (Elderslie) Coach: TBA Affiliate: Wests Tigers

=== Ladder ===
Pos	Team	Pld	W	D	L	B	PF	PA	PD	Pts	Qualification
1	South Sydney Rabbitohs (U19s)	8	7	1	0	1	282	96	+186	17	Minor Premiers & Qualifying Finals
2	Sydney Roosters (U19s)	8	7	0	1	1	275	72	+203	16	Qualifying Finals
3	Melbourne Storm (U19s)	8	7	0	1	1	260	132	+128	16	Qualifying Finals
4	Manly Warringah Sea Eagles (U19s)	8	7	0	1	1	218	158	+60	16	Qualifying Finals
5	Parramatta Eels (U19s)	8	6	1	1	1	279	126	+153	15	Elimination Finals
6	Penrith Panthers (U19s)	8	6	0	2	1	226	130	+96	14	Elimination Finals
7	Newcastle Knights (U19s)	8	5	0	3	1	186	138	+48	12	Elimination Finals
8	Canterbury-Bankstown Bulldogs (U19s)	8	4	0	4	1	214	187	+27	10	Elimination Finals
9	Cronulla-Sutherland Sharks (U19s)	8	3	0	5	1	144	199	–55	8	
10	Western Suburbs Magpies (U19s)	8	3	0	5	1	180	238	–58	8	
11	Illawarra Steelers (U19s)	8	2	1	5	1	154	177	–23	7	
12	Canberra Raiders (U19s)	8	2	0	6	1	146	246	-100	6	
13	New Zealand Warriors (U19s)	8	2	0	6	1	140	254	-114	6	
14	North Sydney Bears (U19s)	8	2	0	6	1	125	262	-137	6	
15	St George Dragons (U19s)	8	1	1	6	1	114	254	-140	5	
16	Balmain Tigers (U19s)	8	1	0	7	1	132	268	-136	4	
17	Central Coast Roosters (U19s)	8	1	0	7	1	132	270	-138	4	

Updated to match(es) played on 1 September. Source:
Rules for classification: 1) points; 2) point difference; 3) points scored

==== Ladder progression ====
- Numbers highlighted in green indicate that the team finished the round inside the top 8.
- Numbers highlighted in blue indicates the team finished first on the ladder in that round.
- Numbers highlighted in red indicates the team finished last place on the ladder in that round.
- Underlined numbers indicate that the team had a bye during that round.

Pos	Team	1	2	3	4	5	6	7	8	9
1	South Sydney Rabbitohs (U19s)	2	4	6	8	10	12	13	15	17
2	Sydney Roosters (U19s)	2	4	6	8	10	12	14	16	16
3	Melbourne Storm (U19s)	2	4	6	8	10	12	12	14	16
4	Manly Warringah Sea Eagles (U19s)	2	4	6	8	8	10	12	14	16
5	Parramatta Eels (U19s)	2	4	6	7	9	9	11	13	15
6	Penrith Panthers (U19s)	0	2	4	6	8	10	12	12	14
7	Newcastle Knights (U19s)	2	4	4	4	6	6	8	10	12
8	Canterbury-Bankstown Bulldogs (U19s)	2	2	4	4	6	6	8	10	10
9	Cronulla-Sutherland Sharks (U19s)	0	0	0	2	2	2	4	6	8
10	Western Suburbs Magpies (U19s)	0	0	0	2	4	4	4	6	8
11	Illawarra Steelers (U19s)	0	0	0	1	1	3	3	5	7
12	Canberra Raiders (U19s)	2	4	4	4	4	4	6	6	6
13	New Zealand Warriors (U19s)	0	0	2	4	4	6	6	6	6
14	North Sydney Bears (U19s)	0	0	2	2	4	4	4	6	6
15	St George Dragons (U19s)	0	0	0	0	2	4	5	5	5
16	Balmain Tigers (U19s)	2	4	4	4	4	4	4	4	4
17	Central Coast Roosters (U19s)	0	0	0	0	0	2	4	4	4

Season Results:

Home	Score	Away	Match Information
Home	Score	Away	Date and Time	Venue	Referee	Video
Round 1
Sydney Roosters (U19s)	18 – 16	Penrith Panthers (U19s)	Saturday, 7 February, 11:30am	Mascot Oval	Bailey Clark
Western Suburbs Magpies (U19s)	12 – 48	Parramatta Eels (U19s)	Saturday, 7 February, 12:00pm	Kirkham Oval	Jayden Kastelan
Canberra Raiders (U19s)	32 – 24	St George Dragons (U19s)	Saturday, 7 February, 12:30pm	Raiders Belconnen	Balunn Simon
Melbourne Storm (U19s)	34 – 12	North Sydney Bears (U19s)	Saturday, 7 February, 2:30pm	Seabrook Reserve	Jonathan Nicholls
Central Coast Roosters (U19s)	4 – 40	Balmain Tigers (U19s)	Saturday, 7 February, 2:30pm	Woy Woy Oval	Liam O'Brien
South Sydney Rabbitohs (U19s)	28 – 22	Illawarra Steelers (U19s)	Saturday, 7 February, 3:15pm	Redfern Oval	Bailey Warren
New Zealand Warriors (U19s)	14 – 28	Manly Warringah Sea Eagles (U19s)	Sunday, 8 February, 11:30am	Bruce Pulman Park	Joseph Green
Newcastle Knights (U19s)	24 – 18	Cronulla-Sutherland Sharks (U19s)	Sunday, 8 February, 3:00pm	Maitland Sports Ground	Jake Walsh
Canterbury-Bankstown Bulldogs (U19s)		BYE
Round 2
Manly Warringah Sea Eagles (U19s)	32 – 18	North Sydney Bears (U19s)	Saturday, 14 February, 2:30pm	4 Pines Park	Jake Walsh
Penrith Panthers (U19s)	56 – 6	Central Coast Roosters (U19s)	Saturday, 14 February, 2:30pm	St Marys Leagues Stadium	Jabril Daizli
Canterbury-Bankstown Bulldogs (U19s)	20 – 28	Canberra Raiders (U19s)	Saturday, 14 February, 3:00pm	McCredie Park	Bailey Clark
Illawarra Steelers (U19s)	8 – 9	Sydney Roosters (U19s)	Saturday, 14 February, 3:00pm	Collegians Sports Stadium	Balunn Simon
Newcastle Knights (U19s)	24 – 12	Western Suburbs Magpies (U19s)	Saturday, 14 February, 3:30pm	Lakeside Sporting Complex	Jayden Kastelan
St George Dragons (U19s)	14 – 44	Melbourne Storm (U19s)	Saturday, 14 February, 4:30pm	Mascot Oval	Liam O'Brien
New Zealand Warriors (U19s)	12 – 36	South Sydney Rabbitohs (U19s)	Sunday, 15 February, 11:30am	Bruce Pulman Park	Jack Feavers
Cronulla-Sutherland Sharks (U19s)	16 – 40	Parramatta Eels (U19s)	Sunday, 15 February, 12:00pm	Henson Park	Bailey Warren
Balmain Tigers (U19s)		BYE
Round 3
Balmain Tigers (U19s)	12 – 54	Parramatta Eels (U19s)	Saturday, 21 February, 12:00pm	Leichhardt Oval	Liam O'Brien
Canterbury-Bankstown Bulldogs (U19s)	44 – 30	Central Coast Roosters (U19s)	Saturday, 21 February, 12:30pm	McCredie Park	Jayden Kastelan
North Sydney Bears (U19s)	23 – 16	Cronulla-Sutherland Sharks (U19s)	Saturday, 21 February, 2:30pm	Hills Grammar Oval	Jabril Daizli
South Sydney Rabbitohs (U19s)	38 – 18	Western Suburbs Magpies (U19s)	Saturday, 21 February, 3:15pm	Redfern Oval	Jake Walsh
Canberra Raiders (U19s)	24 – 30	Penrith Panthers (U19s)	Saturday, 21 February, 3:30pm	Raiders Belconnen	Matthew Gomes
Newcastle Knights (U19s)	24 – 28	Melbourne Storm (U19s)	Saturday, 21 February, 4:30pm	Lakeside Sporting Complex	Bailey Clark
Illawarra Steelers (U19s)	10 – 26	Manly Warringah Sea Eagles (U19s)	Saturday, 21 February, 5:30pm	WIN Stadium	Bailey Warren
Sydney Roosters (U19s)	52 – 0	St George Dragons (U19s)	Sunday, 22 February, 12:30pm	Henson Park	Balunn Simon
New Zealand Warriors (U19s)		BYE
Round 4
South Sydney Rabbitohs (U19s)	38 – 10	Canterbury-Bankstown Bulldogs (U19s)	Saturday, 28 February, 1:15pm	Redfern Oval	Balunn Simon
Sydney Roosters (U19s)	28 – 4	Newcastle Knights (U19s)	Saturday, 28 February, 2:00pm	Leichhardt Oval	Bailey Clark
Western Suburbs Magpies (U19s)	36 – 14	Balmain Tigers (U19s)	Saturday, 28 February, 2:30pm	Kirkham Oval	Bailey Warren
Cronulla-Sutherland Sharks (U19s)	20 – 0	St George Dragons (U19s)	Saturday, 28 February, 2:45pm	Ocean Protect Stadium	Jabril Daizli
North Sydney Bears (U19s)	12 – 38	Penrith Panthers (U19s)	Saturday, 28 February, 3:00pm	St Marys Leagues Stadium	Liam O'Brien
Parramatta Eels (U19s)	24 – 24	Illawarra Steelers (U19s)	Saturday, 28 February, 5:00pm	James Hardie Centre of Excellence	Jake Walsh
New Zealand Warriors (U19s)	34 – 18	Central Coast Roosters (U19s)	Sunday, 1 March, 11:30am	Bruce Pulman Park	Joseph Green
Canberra Raiders (U19s)	22 – 28	Melbourne Storm (U19s)	Sunday, 1 March, 2:30pm	Raiders Belconnen	Jayden Kastelan
Manly Warringah Sea Eagles (U19s)		BYE
Round 5
Canterbury-Bankstown Bulldogs (U19s)	50 – 4	New Zealand Warriors (U19s)	Saturday, 7 March, 12:00pm	Hammondville Oval	Bailey Clark
Melbourne Storm (U19s)	34 – 20	Balmain Tigers (U19s)	Saturday, 7 March, 2:00pm	Gosch's Paddock	Jonathan Nicholls
Central Coast Roosters (U19s)	18 – 26	Newcastle Knights (U19s)	Saturday, 7 March, 2:00pm	Woy Woy Oval	Matthew Gomes
Illawarra Steelers (U19s)	18 – 22	Western Suburbs Magpies (U19s)	Saturday, 7 March, 3:00pm	Collegians Sports Stadium	Matthew Galvin
Cronulla-Sutherland Sharks (U19s)	6 – 38	Sydney Roosters (U19s)	Saturday, 7 March, 3:15pm	Ocean Protect Stadium	Bailey Warren
Canberra Raiders (U19s)	16 – 24	North Sydney Bears (U19s)	Saturday, 7 March, 4:30pm	Raiders Belconnen	Liam O'Brien
Manly Warringah Sea Eagles (U19s)	6 – 38	South Sydney Rabbitohs (U19s)	Sunday, 8 March, 12:30pm	4 Pines Park	Jake Walsh
St George Dragons (U19s)	BYE	Parramatta Eels (U19s)
Penrith Panthers (U19s)	BYE
Round 6
Penrith Panthers (U19s)	20 – 18	Newcastle Knights (U19s)	Saturday, 14 March, 12:15pm	St Marys Leagues Stadium	Jayden Kastelan
Western Suburbs Magpies (U19s)	26 – 44	Manly Warringah Sea Eagles (U19s)	Saturday, 14 March, 12:25pm	Lidcombe Oval	Brayden Silvester
Canterbury-Bankstown Bulldogs (U19s)	16 – 24	Illawarra Steelers (U19s)	Saturday, 14 March, 12:30pm	Hammondville Oval	Matthew Gomes
Sydney Roosters (U19s)	56 – 0	Canberra Raiders (U19s)	Saturday, 14 March, 1:30pm	Mascot Oval	Aidan Richardson
Melbourne Storm (U19s)	50 – 6	Cronulla-Sutherland Sharks (U19s)	Saturday, 14 March, 2:00pm	Seabrook Reserve	Bailey Clark
St George Dragons (U19s)	32 – 22	North Sydney Bears (U19s)	Saturday, 14 March, 2:30pm	Collegians Sports Stadium	Matthew Galvin
South Sydney Rabbitohs (U19s)	44 – 10	Parramatta Eels (U19s)	Saturday, 14 March, 3:45pm	Redfern Oval	Bailey Warren
Balmain Tigers (U19s)	16 – 24	New Zealand Warriors (U19s)	Sunday, 15 March, 1:30pm	Leichhardt Oval	Liam O'Brien
Central Coast Roosters (U19s)		BYE
Round 7
North Sydney Bears (U19s)	10 – 56	Sydney Roosters (U19s)	Saturday, 21 March, 11:30am	Hills Grammar Oval	Bailey Clark
Parramatta Eels (U19s)	44 – 4	New Zealand Warriors (U19s)	Saturday, 21 March, 12:00pm	James Hardie Centre of Excellence	Liam O'Brien
Manly Warringah Sea Eagles (U19s)	28 – 16	Balmain Tigers (U19s)	Saturday, 21 March, 1:30pm	4 Pines Park	Matthew Gomes
Penrith Panthers (U19s)	16 – 14	Melbourne Storm (U19s)	Saturday, 21 March, 2:30pm	HE Laybutt Sporting Complex	Jayden Kastelan
St George Dragons (U19s)	14 – 14	South Sydney Rabbitohs (U19s)	Saturday, 21 March, 2:30pm	Collegians Sports Stadium	Matthew Galvin
Western Suburbs Magpies (U19s)	22 – 26	Canterbury-Bankstown Bulldogs (U19s)	Saturday, 21 March, 3:30pm	Kirkham Oval	Balunn Simon
Central Coast Roosters (U19s)	30 – 18	Illawarra Steelers (U19s)	Saturday, 21 March, 3:30pm	Woy Woy Oval	Brayden Silvester
Newcastle Knights (U19s)	BYE	Canberra Raiders (U19s)
Cronulla-Sutherland Sharks (U19s)	BYE
Round 8
Newcastle Knights (U19s)	28 – 10	Canberra Raiders (U19s)	Saturday, 28 March, 3:00pm	Cessnock Sportsground	Bailey Clark
Penrith Panthers (U19s)	10 – 26	Cronulla-Sutherland Sharks (U19s)	Saturday, 28 March, 3:00pm	St Marys Leagues Stadium	Jayden Kastelan
Parramatta Eels (U19s)	28 – 8	Central Coast Roosters (U19s)	Saturday, 28 March, 4:00pm	Eric Tweedale Stadium	Balunn Simon
New Zealand Warriors (U19s)	26 – 32	Western Suburbs Magpies (U19s)	Sunday, 29 March, 11:30am	Bruce Pulman Park	Paki Parkinson
Balmain Tigers (U19s)	10 – 42	Canterbury-Bankstown Bulldogs (U19s)	Sunday, 29 March, 12:00pm	Leichhardt Oval	Bailey Warren
Manly Warringah Sea Eagles (U19s)	30 – 18	St George Dragons (U19s)	Sunday, 29 March, 2:30pm	Sydney Academy of Sport	Liam O'Brien
North Sydney Bears (U19s)	BYE	South Sydney Rabbitohs (U19s)
Sydney Roosters (U19s)	BYE	Illawarra Steelers (U19s)
Melbourne Storm (U19s)	BYE
Round 9 (Easter Round)
Cronulla-Sutherland Sharks (U19s)	36 – 14	Canberra Raiders (U19s)	Friday, 3 April, 5:15pm	Ocean Protect Stadium	Bailey Clark
Illawarra Steelers (U19s)	30 – 22	New Zealand Warriors (U19s)	Saturday, 4 April, 11:50am	Collegians Sports Stadium	Liam O'Brien
Balmain Tigers (U19s)	4 – 46	South Sydney Rabbitohs (U19s)	Saturday, 4 April, 12:00pm	Leichhardt Oval	Jayden Kastelan
Melbourne Storm (U19s)	28 – 18	Sydney Roosters (U19s)	Saturday, 4 April, 2:00pm	Seabrook Reserve	Bailey Warren
Parramatta Eels (U19s)	31 – 6	Canterbury-Bankstown Bulldogs (U19s)	Saturday, 4 April, 2:30pm	James Hardie Centre of Excellence	Matthew Galvin
North Sydney Bears (U19s)	4 – 38	Newcastle Knights (U19s)	Saturday, 4 April, 3:00pm	Hills Grammar Oval	Balunn Simon
Central Coast Roosters (U19s)	18 – 24	Manly Warringah Sea Eagles (U19s)	Sunday, 5 April, 11:30am	Central Coast Regional Sporting Complex	Stuart Halsey
St George Dragons (U19s)	12 – 40	Penrith Panthers (U19s)	Sunday, 5 April, 2:30pm	Jubilee Stadium	Matthew Gomes
Western Suburbs Magpies (U19s)		BYE
Finals Series
Qualifying & Elimination Finals
South Sydney Rabbitohs (U19s)	V	Manly Warringah Sea Eagles (U19s)	11/12 April	TBA	TBA
Sydney Roosters (U19s)	V	Melbourne Storm (U19s)	11/12 April	TBA	TBA
Parramatta Eels (U19s)	V	Canterbury-Bankstown Bulldogs (U19s)	11/12 April	TBA	TBA
Penrith Panthers (U19s)	V	Newcastle Knights (U19s)	11/12 April	TBA	TBA
Semi-Finals
QF1 Loser	V	EF1 Winner	18/19 April	TBA	TBA
QF2 Loser	V	EF2 Winner	18/19 April	TBA	TBA
Preliminary Finals
QF2 Winner	V	SF1 Winner	25/26 April	TBA	TBA
QF1 Winner	V	SF2 Winner	25/26 April	TBA	TBA
Grand Final
PF1 Winner	V	PF2 Winner	2/3 May	TBA	TBA

=== Grand Final ===
Qualifying & Elimination Finals
1	South Sydney
4	Manly Warringah
5	Parramatta
8	Canterbury-Bankstown
6	Penrith
7	Newcastle
2	Sydney
3	Melbourne

Semi-Finals
1/4
5/8
2/3
6/7

Preliminary Finals
1/4
2/3/6/7
2/3
1/4/5/8

Grand Final

2026 SG Ball Cup Grand Final

2/3 May 2026
TBA

PF1 Winner	v	PF2 Winner

TBA

== Tarsha Gale Cup ==
2026 Westpac Tarsha Gale Cup
- Duration: 7 February – 2/3 May 2026
- Teams: 14
- Broadcast partners: Streaming; BarTV Sports (All Matches)

The Tarsha Gale Cup (named the Westpac Tarsha Gale Cup for sponsorship reasons) is a junior representative competition for female players and one of the key stages in the NSWRL female participation pathway. The competition provides a high-performance environment for young women progressing towards senior women's competitions and the NRLW.

=== Teams ===
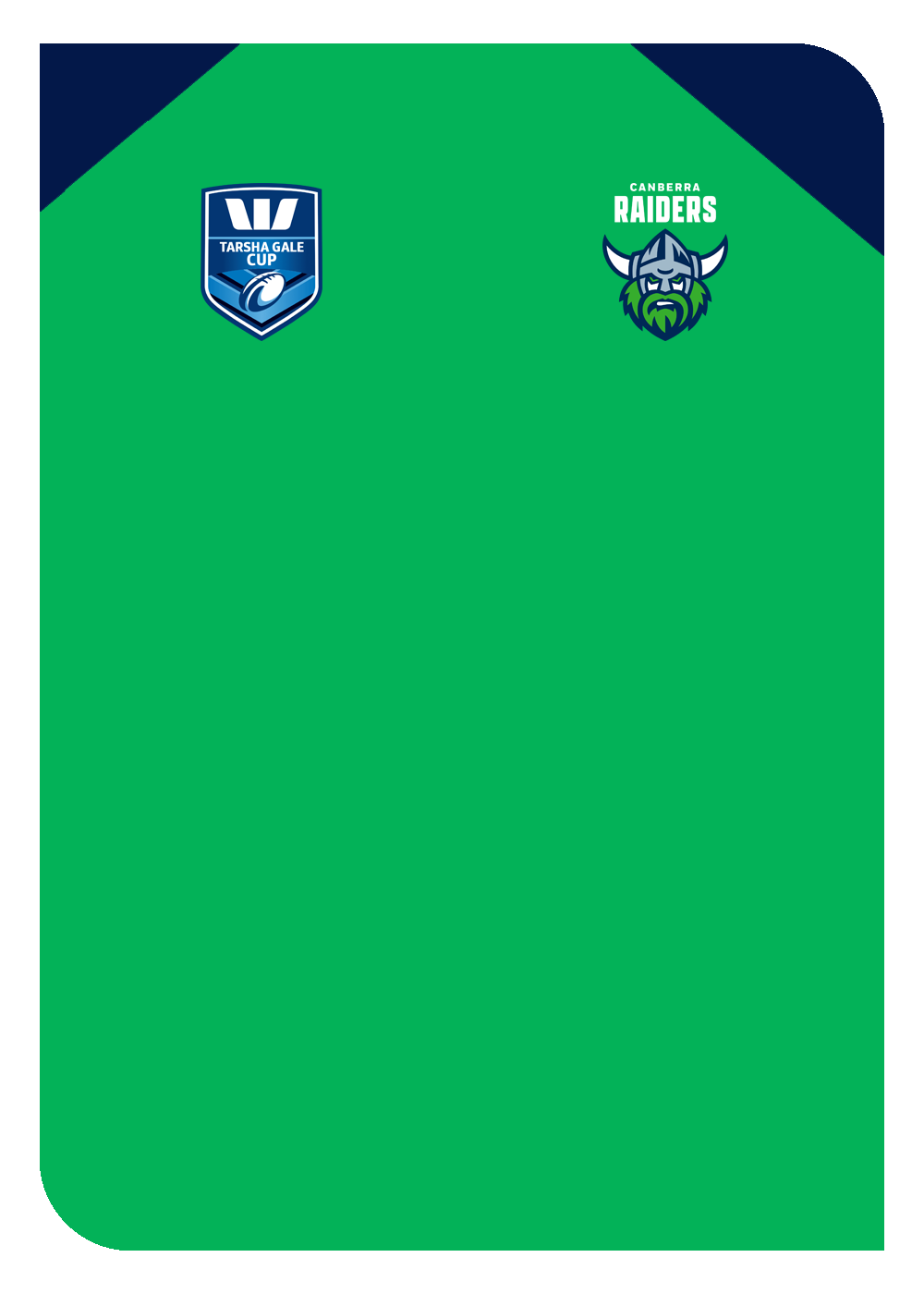
Canberra; Raiders Ground: Raiders Belconnen City/Suburb: Canberra (Holt) Coach: TBA Affiliate: Canberra Raiders

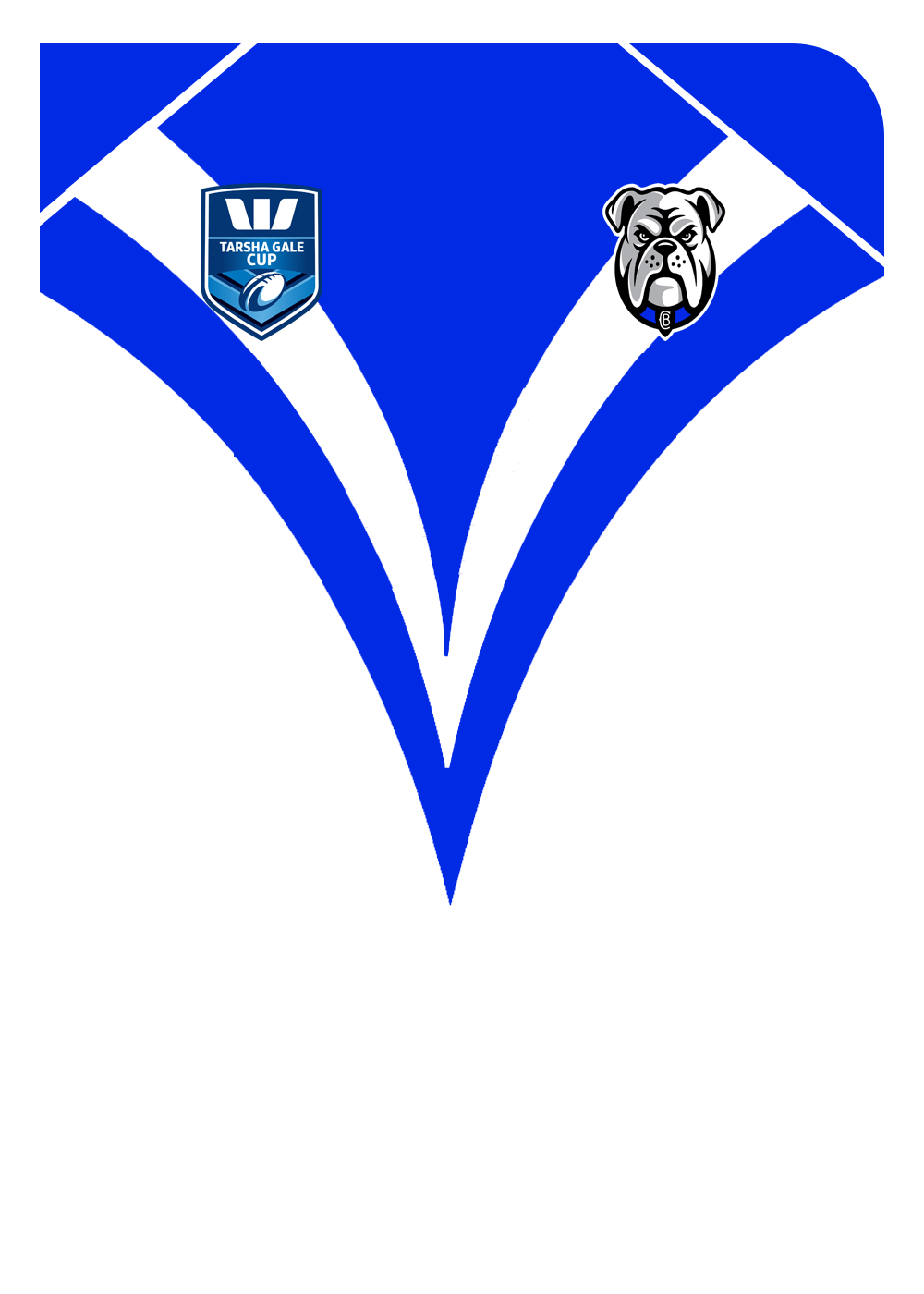
Canterbury-Bankstown; Bulldogs Ground: Hammondville Oval City/Suburb: Sydney (Hammondville) Coach: TBA Affiliate: Canterbury-Bankstown Bulldogs

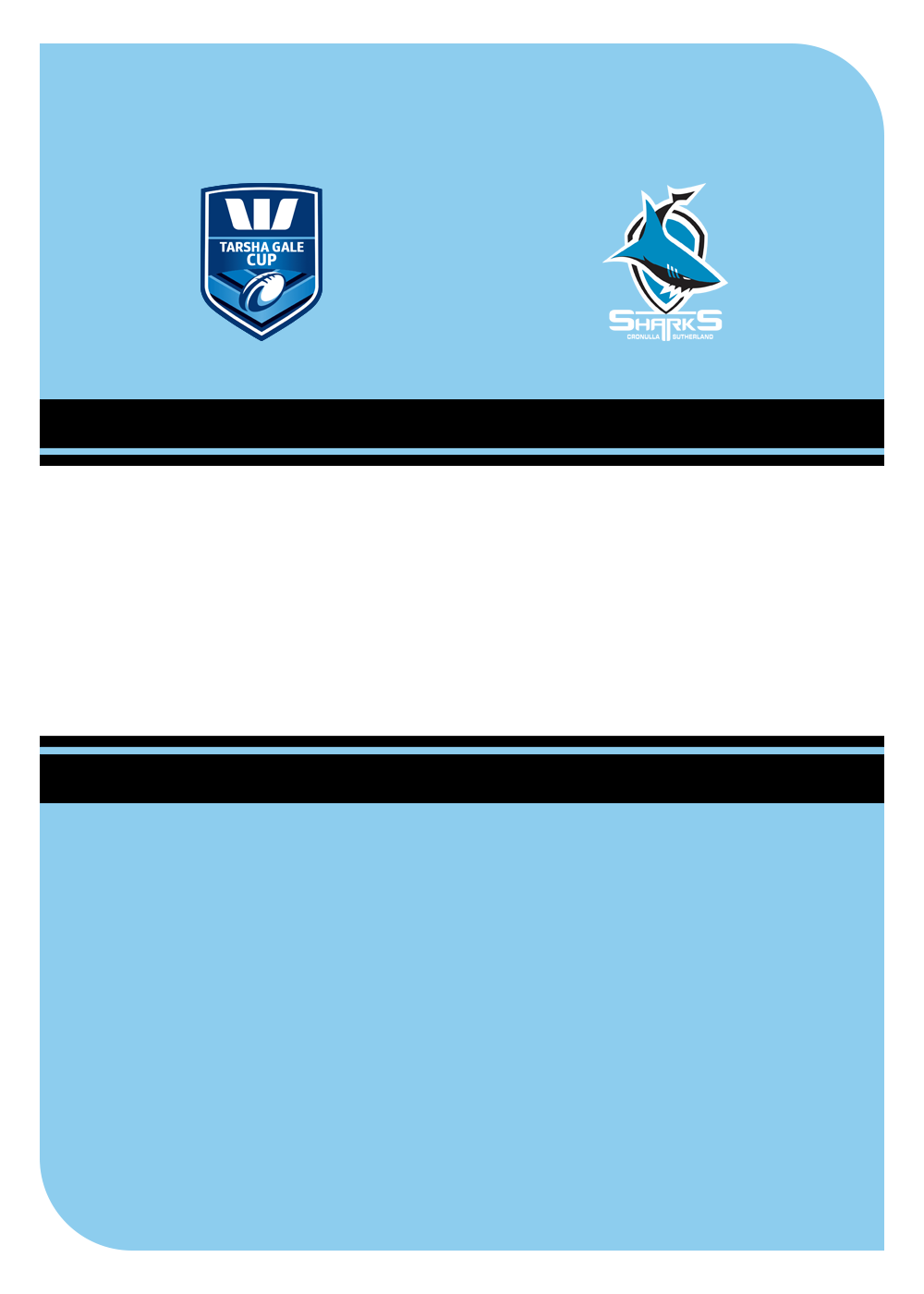
Cronulla-Sutherland; Sharks Ground: Ocean Protect Stadium City/Suburb: Sydney (Woolooware) Coach: TBA Affiliate: Cronulla-Sutherland Sharks

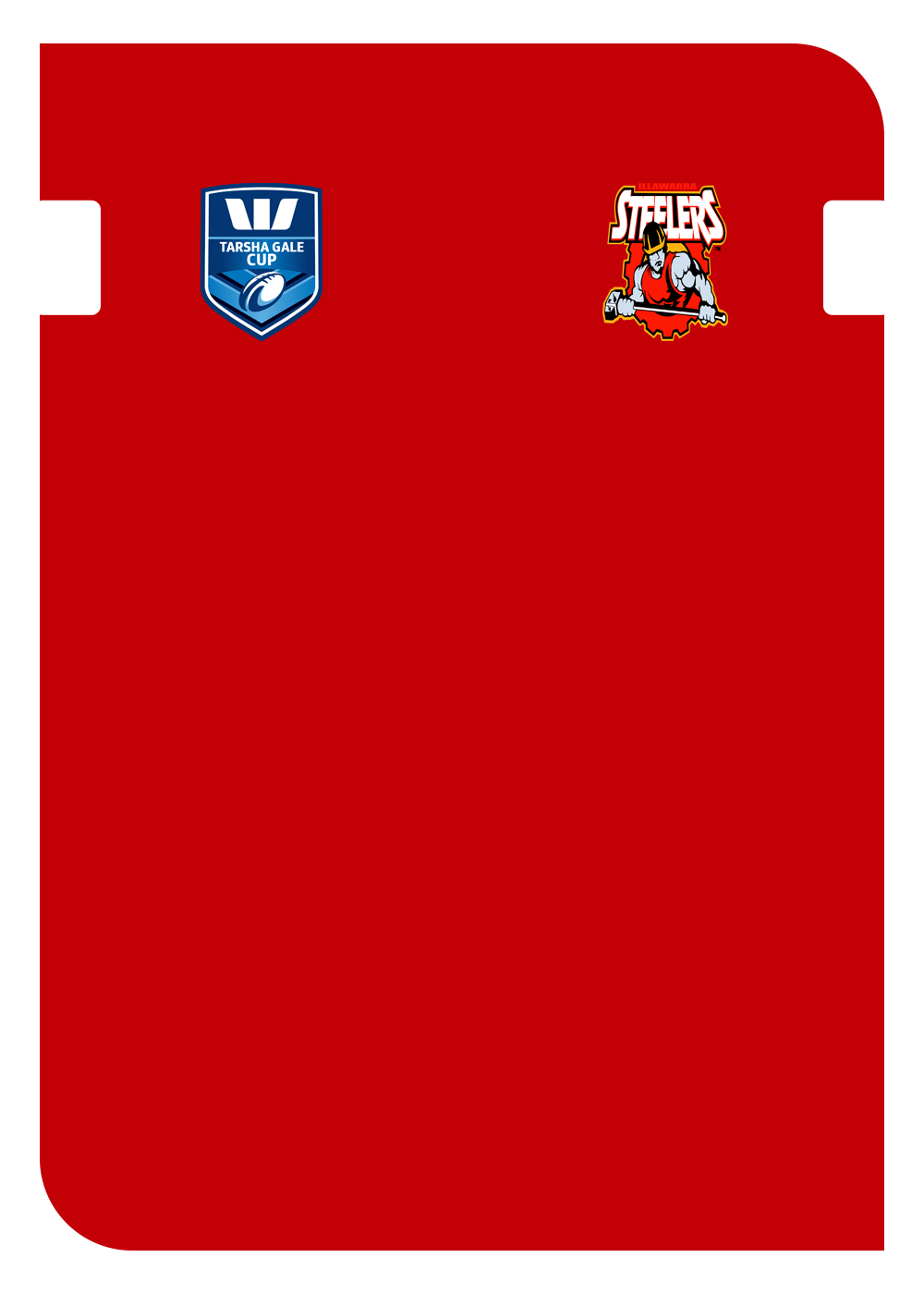
Illawarra; Steelers Ground: Collegians Sports Stadium City/Suburb: Wollongong (Figtree) Coach: TBA Affiliate: St George Illawarra Dragons

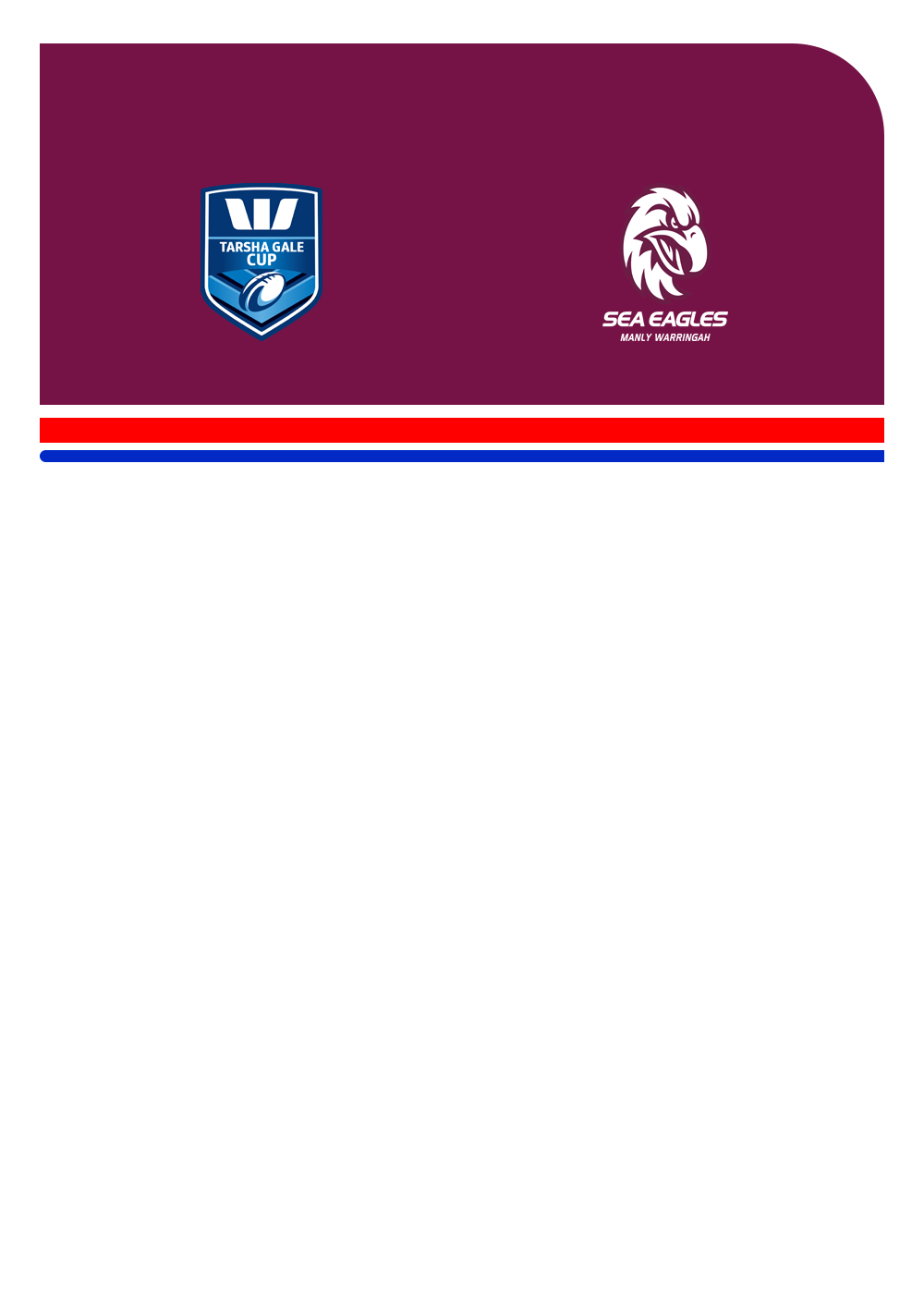
Manly Warringah; Sea Eagles Ground: 4 Pines Park City/Suburb: Sydney (Brookvale) Coach: TBA Affiliate: Manly Warringah Sea Eagles

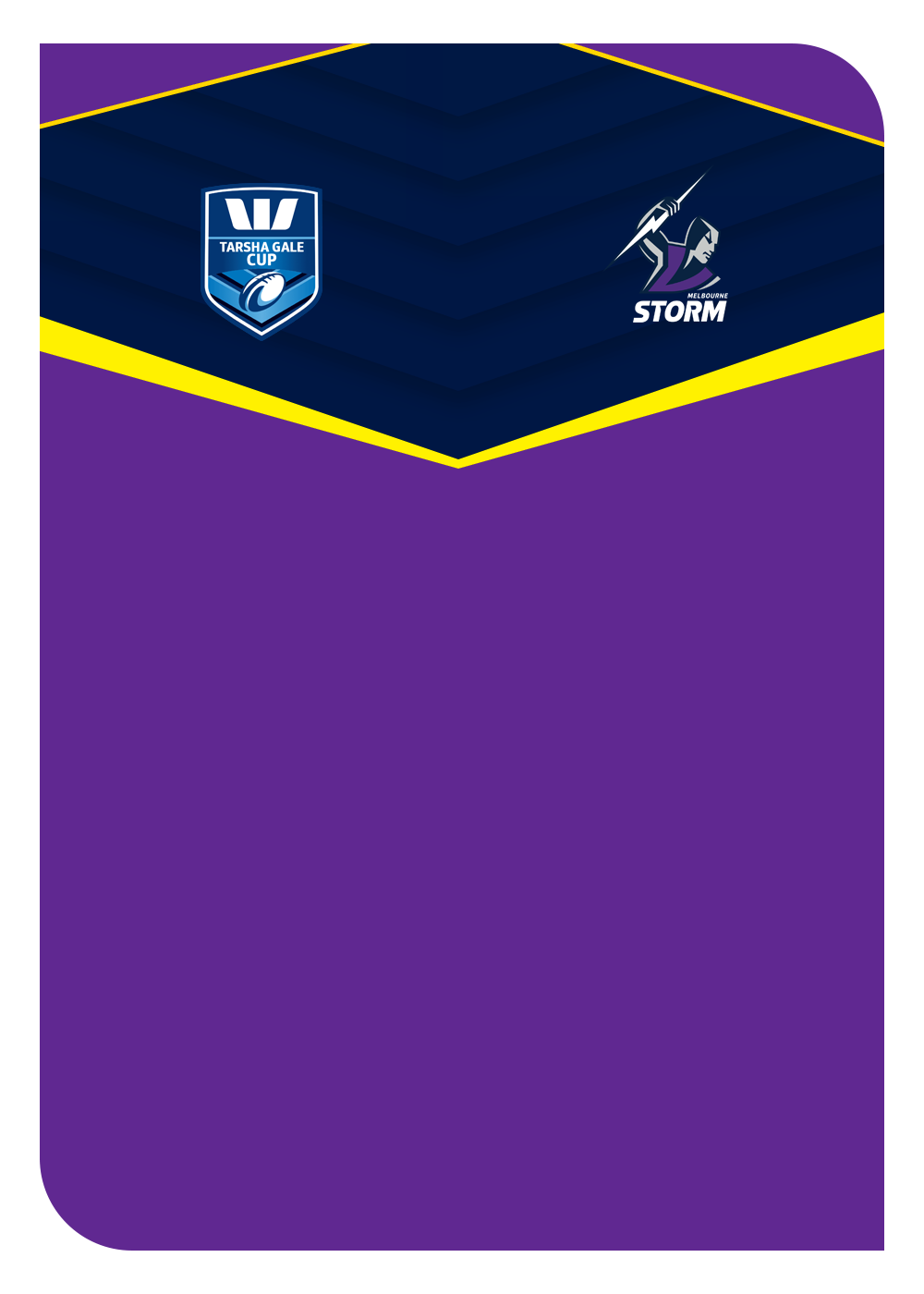
Melbourne; Storm Ground: Seabrook Reserve City/Suburb: Melbourne (Broadmeadows) Coach: TBA Affiliate: Melbourne Storm

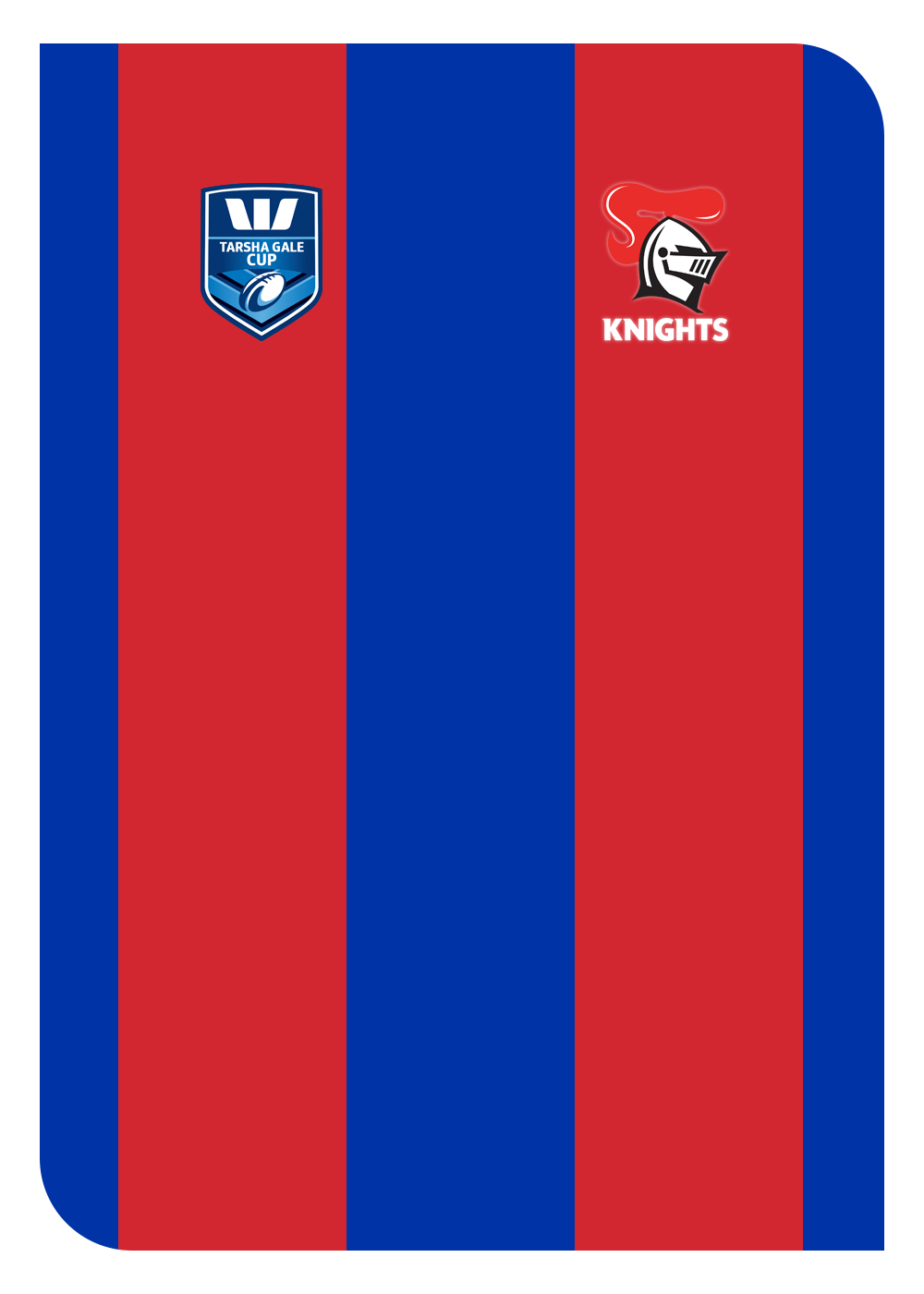
Newcastle; Knights Ground: Lakeside Sporting Complex City/Suburb: Raymond Terrace Coach: TBA Affiliate: Newcastle Knights

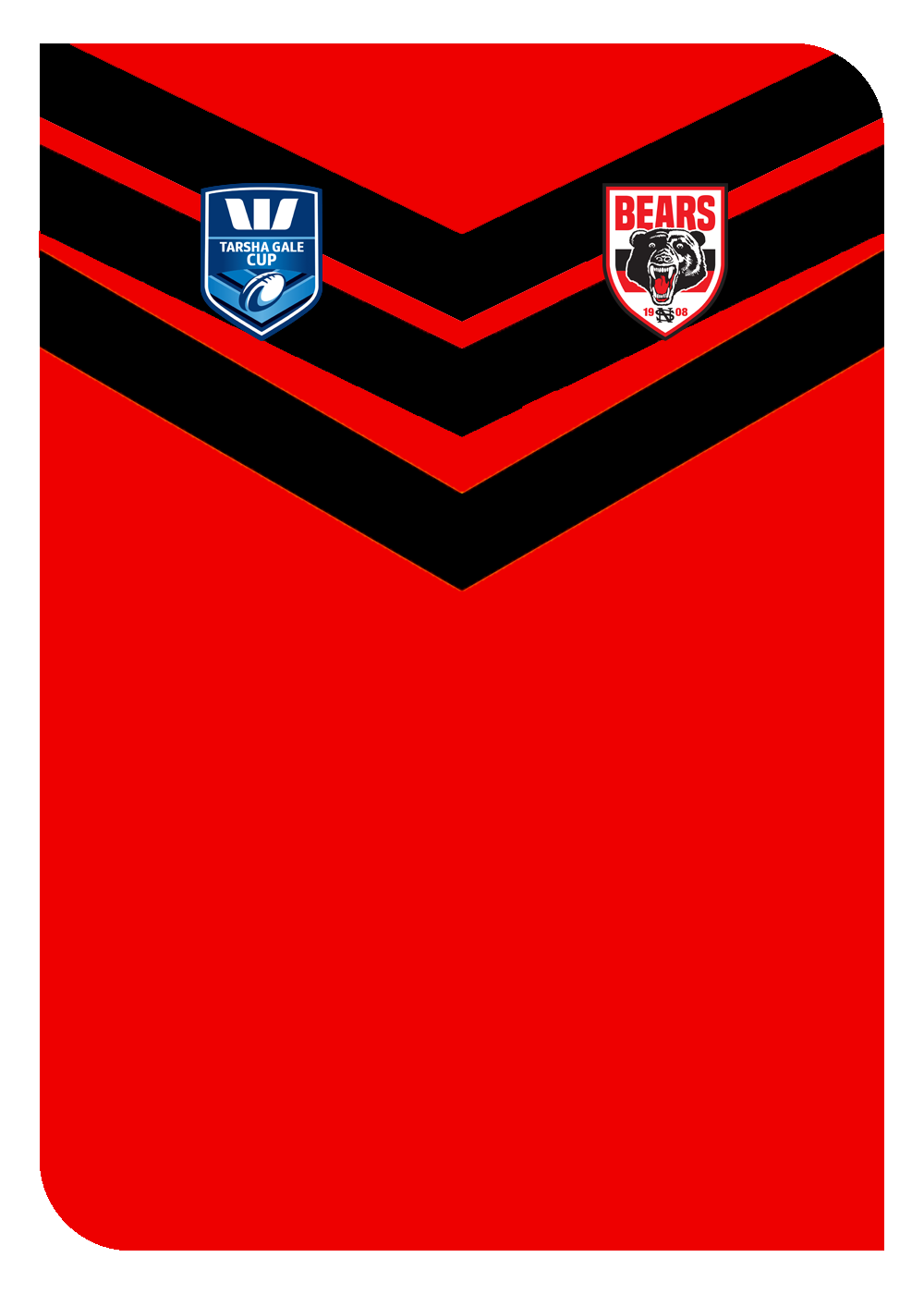
North Sydney; Bears Ground: Hills Grammar Oval City/Suburb: Sydney (Kenthurst) Coach: TBA Affiliate: Perth Bears

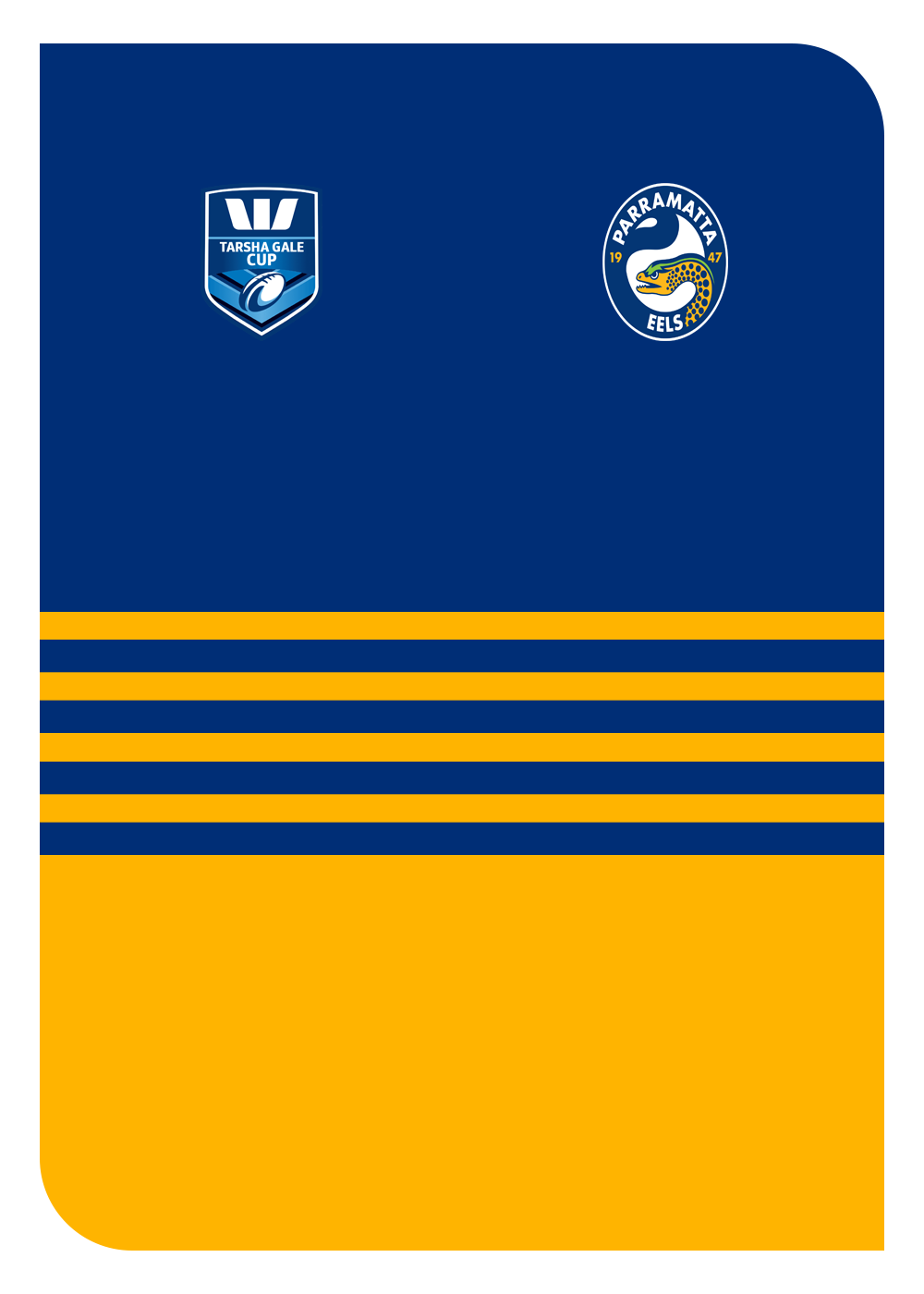
Parramatta; Eels Ground: James Hardie Centre of Excellence City/Suburb: Sydney (Kellyville) Coach: TBA Affiliate: Parramatta Eels

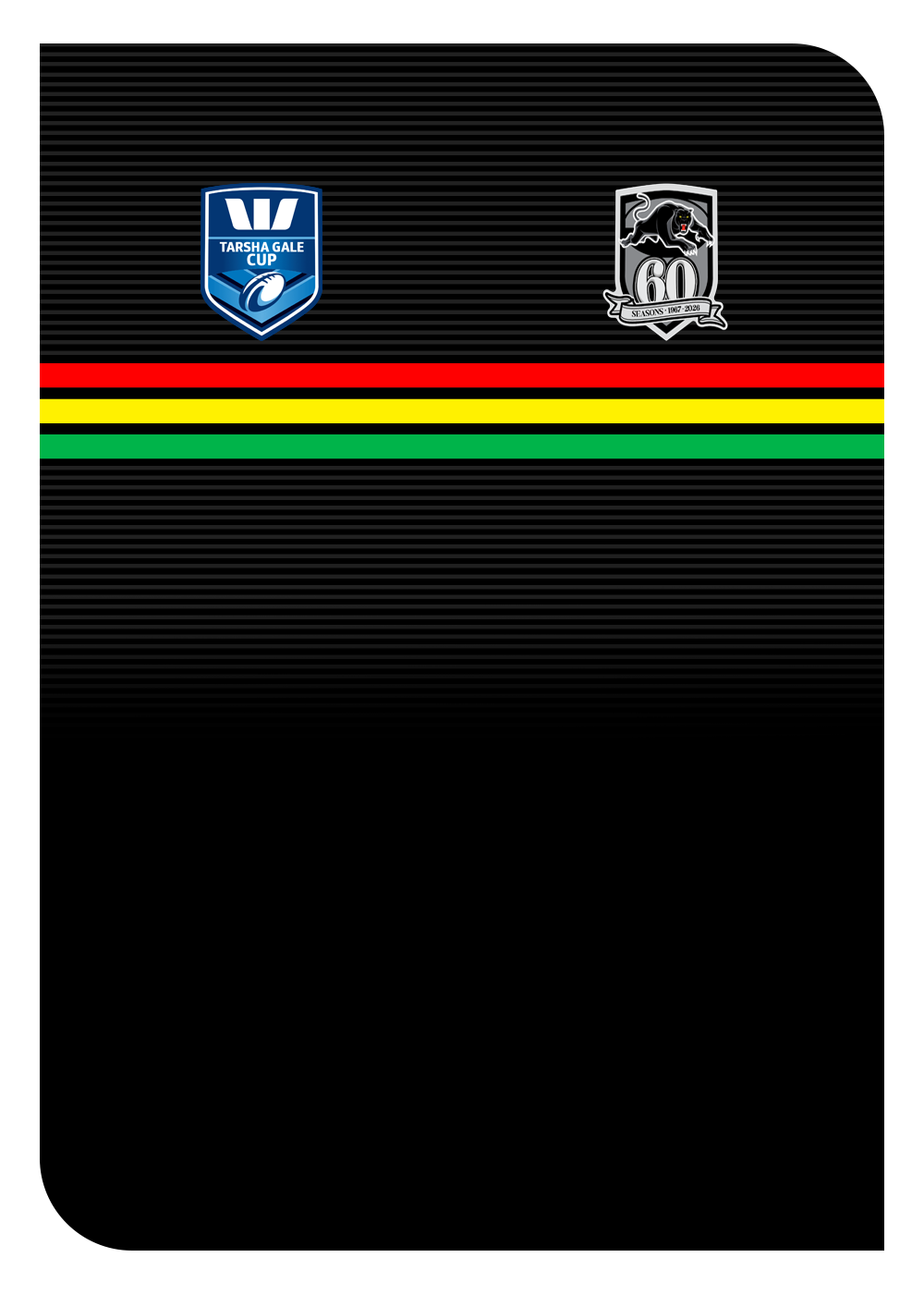
Penrith; Panthers Ground: Parker Street Reserve City/Suburb: Sydney (Penrith) Coach: TBA Affiliate: Penrith Panthers

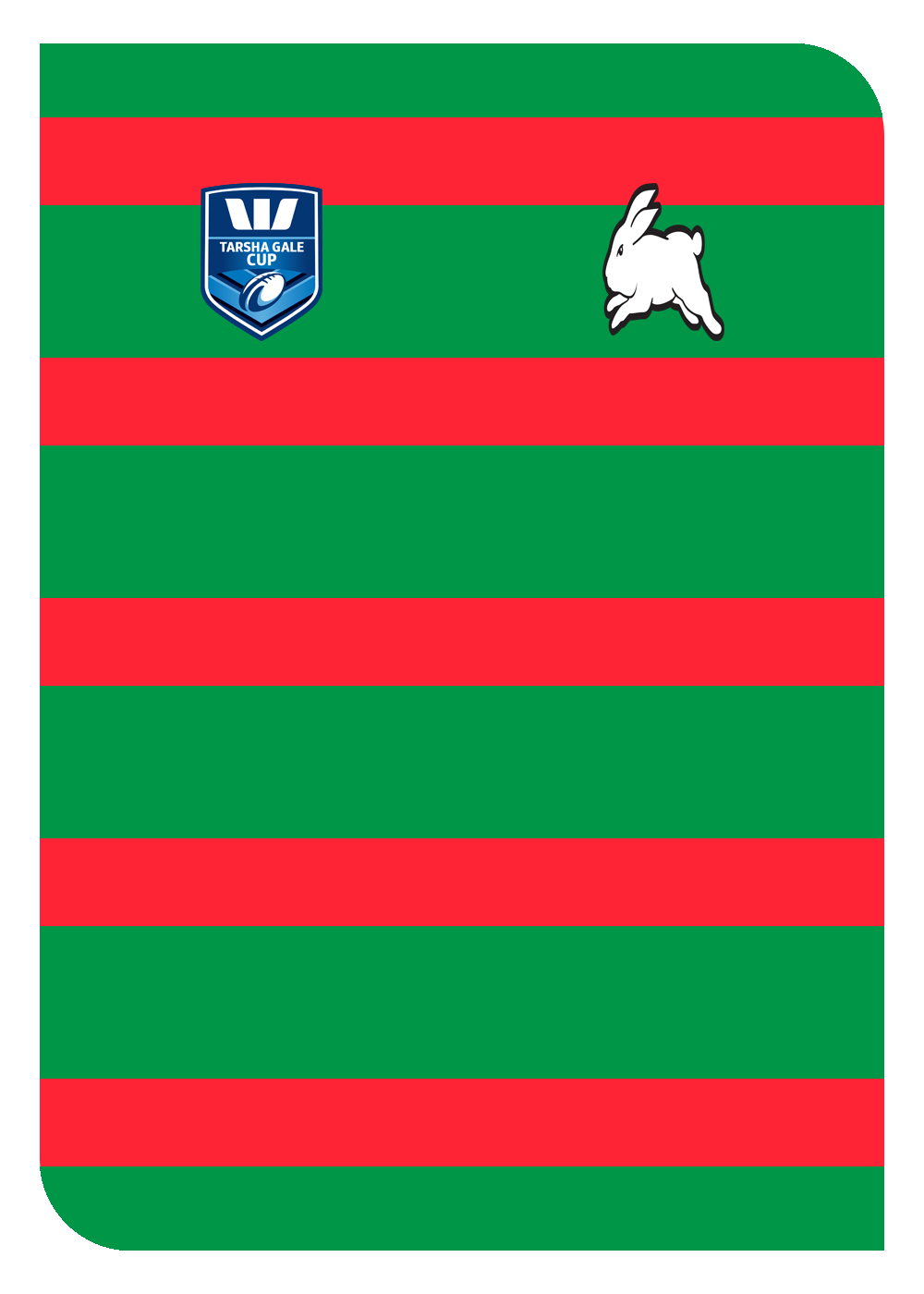
South Sydney; Rabbitohs Ground: Redfern Oval City/Suburb: Sydney (Redfern) Coach: TBA Affiliate: South Sydney Rabbitohs

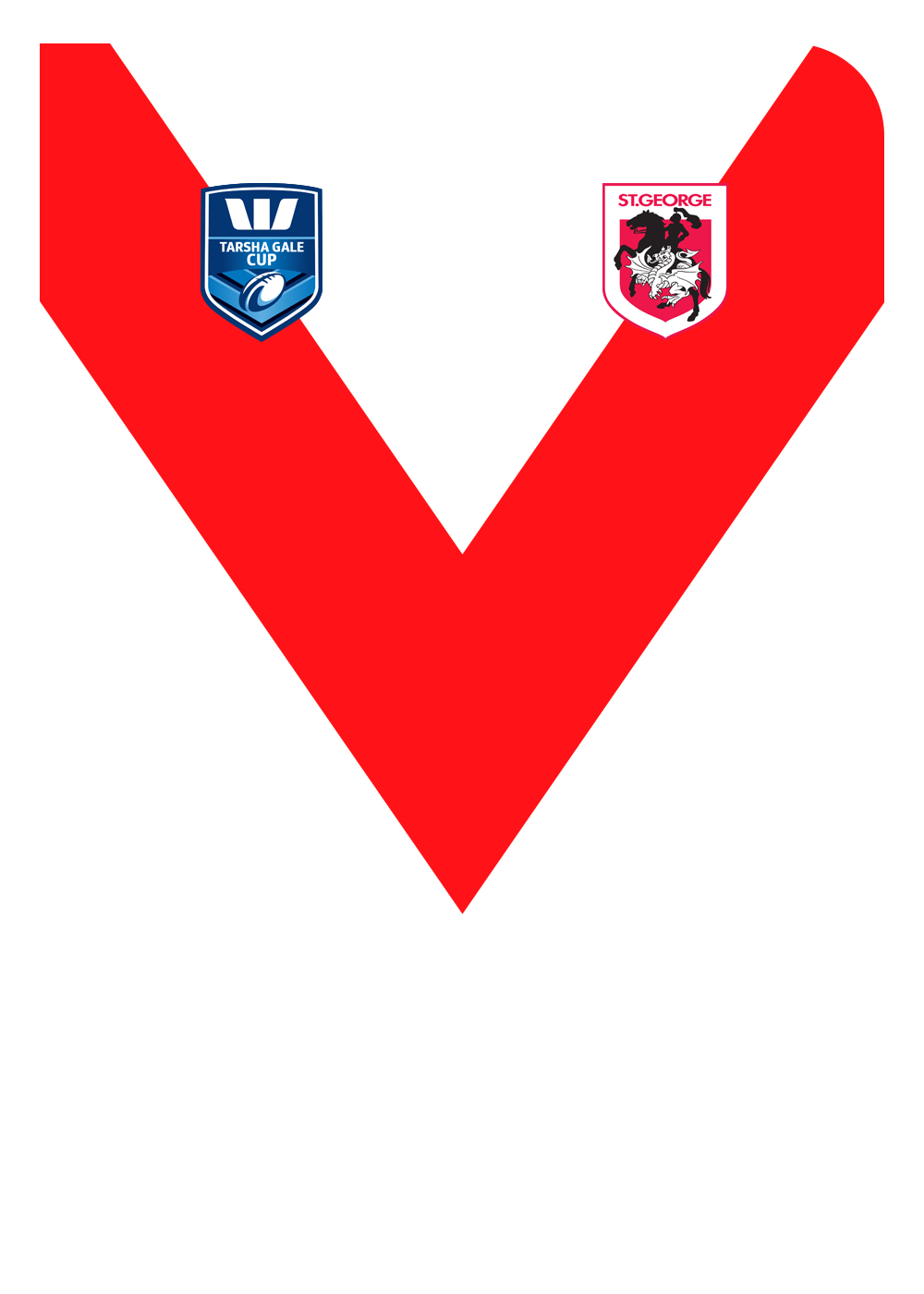
St George; Dragons Ground: Jubilee Stadium City/Suburb: Sydney (Kogarah) Coach: TBA Affiliate: St George Illawarra Dragons

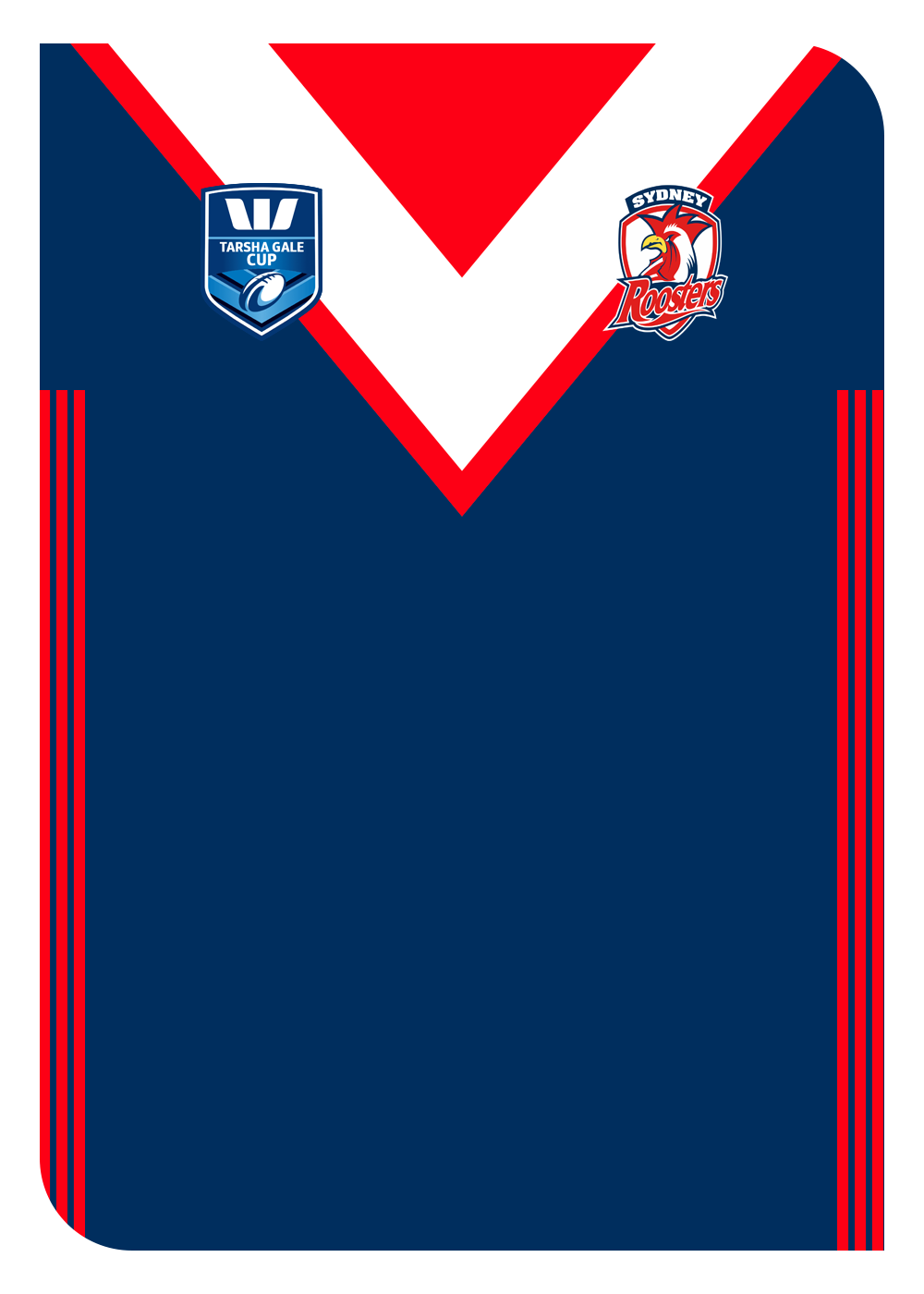
Sydney; Roosters Ground: Mascot Oval City/Suburb: Sydney (Mascot) Coach: TBA Affiliate: Sydney Roosters

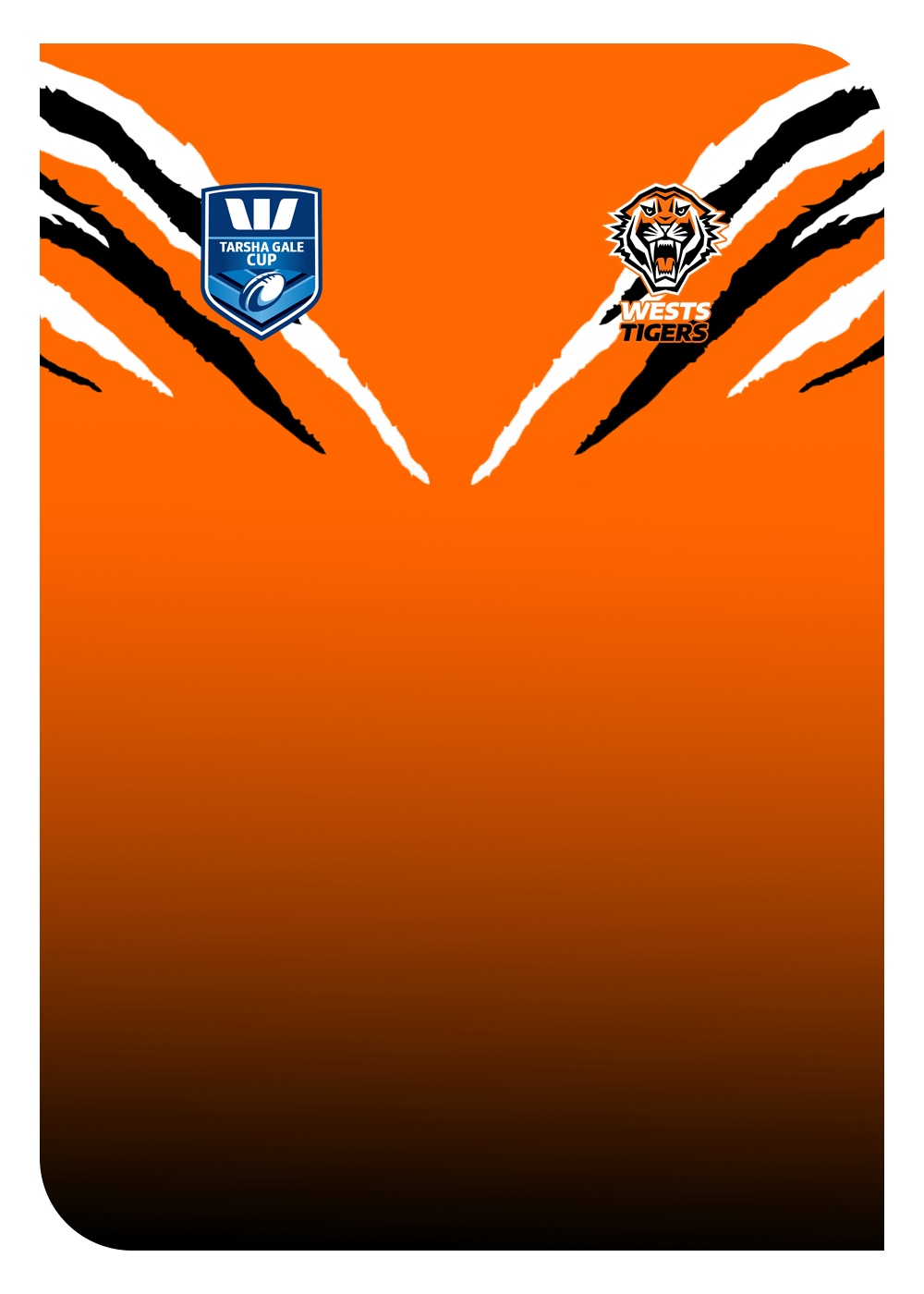
Wests; Tigers Ground: Leichhardt Oval City/Suburb: Sydney (Leichhardt) Coach: TBA Affiliate: Wests Tigers

=== Ladder ===
Pos	Team	Pld	W	D	L	B	PF	PA	PD	Pts	Qualification
1	Sydney Roosters (U19s G)	8	7	0	1	1	286	74	+212	16	Minor Premiers & Qualifying Finals
2	Parramatta Eels (U19s G)	8	7	0	1	1	256	92	+164	16	Qualifying Finals
3	Canterbury-Bankstown Bulldogs (U19s G)	8	6	0	2	1	264	112	+152	14	Qualifying Finals
4	Cronulla-Sutherland Sharks (U19s G)	8	6	0	2	1	192	88	+104	14	Qualifying Finals
5	Penrith Panthers (U19s G)	8	5	1	2	1	184	122	+62	13	Elimination Finals
6	Newcastle Knights (U19s G)	8	5	0	3	1	224	116	+108	12	Elimination Finals
7	Illawarra Steelers (U19s G)	8	5	0	3	1	156	116	+40	12	Elimination Finals
8	Wests Tigers (U19s G)	8	3	1	4	1	144	130	+14	9	Elimination Finals
9	North Sydney Bears (U19s G)	8	3	1	4	1	126	238	-112	9	
10	Canberra Raiders (U19s G)	8	3	0	5	1	152	182	–30	8	
11	Melbourne Storm (U19s G)	8	1	1	6	1	118	270	-152	5	
12	South Sydney Rabbitohs (U19s G)	8	1	1	6	1	68	234	-166	5	
13	St George Dragons (U19s G)	8	1	0	7	1	98	240	-142	4	
14	Manly Warringah Sea Eagles (U19s G)	8	0	1	7	1	48	302	-254	3	

Updated to match(es) played on 1 September. Source:
Rules for classification: 1) points; 2) point difference; 3) points scored

==== Ladder progression ====
- Numbers highlighted in green indicate that the team finished the round inside the top 8.
- Numbers highlighted in blue indicates the team finished first on the ladder in that round.
- Numbers highlighted in red indicates the team finished last place on the ladder in that round.
- Underlined numbers indicate that the team had a bye during that round.

Pos	Team	1	2	3	4	5	6	7	8	9
1	Sydney Roosters (U19s G)	2	4	6	8	10	12	14	14	16
2	Parramatta Eels (U19s G)	0	2	4	6	8	10	12	14	16
3	Canterbury-Bankstown Bulldogs (U19s G)	2	4	6	8	10	10	12	14	14
4	Cronulla-Sutherland Sharks (U19s G)	2	2	4	6	8	10	12	12	14
5	Penrith Panthers (U19s G)	0	2	4	5	5	7	9	11	13
6	Newcastle Knights (U19s G)	0	2	4	4	6	6	8	10	12
7	Illawarra Steelers (U19s G)	2	2	4	4	4	6	8	10	12
8	Wests Tigers (U19s G)	2	2	4	6	7	9	9	9	9
9	North Sydney Bears (U19s G)	2	4	4	5	5	7	7	9	9
10	Canberra Raiders (U19s G)	2	2	2	4	6	6	8	8	8
11	Melbourne Storm (U19s G)	0	2	2	2	3	3	3	5	5
12	South Sydney Rabbitohs (U19s G)	0	0	0	0	0	0	2	4	5
13	St George Dragons (U19s G)	0	0	0	0	2	2	2	4	4
14	Manly Warringah Sea Eagles (U19s G)	0	0	0	2	2	2	2	2	3

Season Results:

Home	Score	Away	Match Information
Home	Score	Away	Date and Time	Venue	Referee	Video
Round 1
Canterbury-Bankstown Bulldogs (U19s G)	60 – 4	Manly Warringah Sea Eagles (U19s G)	Saturday, 7 February, 11:30am	Hammondville Oval	Carter Spowert-Lehman
South Sydney Rabbitohs (U19s G)	4 – 22	Illawarra Steelers (U19s G)	Saturday, 7 February, 11:45am	Redfern Oval	William Flint
Melbourne Storm (U19s G)	22 – 36	North Sydney Bears (U19s G)	Saturday, 7 February, 2:30pm	Seabrook Reserve	Matt Hicks
Wests Tigers (U19s G)	22 – 16	Parramatta Eels (U19s G)	Saturday, 7 February, 3:00pm	Kirkham Oval	Jaylen Chasle
Canberra Raiders (U19s G)	32 – 10	St George Dragons (U19s G)	Saturday, 7 February, 3:30pm	Raiders Belconnen	Thomas Inness
Sydney Roosters (U19s G)	34 – 4	Penrith Panthers (U19s G)	Saturday, 7 February, 4:15pm	Woy Woy Oval	Ben Thompson
Newcastle Knights (U19s G)	10 – 16	Cronulla-Sutherland Sharks (U19s G)	Sunday, 8 February, 12:00pm	Maitland Sports Ground	Aleksandr Fitzgerald
Round 2
Manly Warringah Sea Eagles (U19s G)	6 – 30	North Sydney Bears (U19s G)	Saturday, 14 February, 11:30am	4 Pines Park	Lachlan Bryant
Penrith Panthers (U19s G)	26 – 12	South Sydney Rabbitohs (U19s G)	Saturday, 14 February, 11:30am	St Marys Leagues Stadium	William Flint
Illawarra Steelers (U19s G)	0 – 32	Sydney Roosters (U19s G)	Saturday, 14 February, 12:00pm	Collegians Sports Stadium	Jack Catania
Newcastle Knights (U19s G)	16 – 10	Wests Tigers (U19s G)	Saturday, 14 February, 12:30pm	Lakeside Sporting Complex	Aleksandr Fitzgerald
St George Dragons (U19s G)	16 – 26	Melbourne Storm (U19s G)	Saturday, 14 February, 1:30pm	Jubilee Stadium	Tallon Irons
Canterbury-Bankstown Bulldogs (U19s G)	30 – 6	Canberra Raiders (U19s G)	Saturday, 14 February, 3:30pm	Hammondville Oval	Ben Thompson
Cronulla-Sutherland Sharks (U19s G)	6 – 10	Parramatta Eels (U19s G)	Saturday, 14 February, 4:45pm	Ocean Protect Stadium	Reece Sammut
Round 3
North Sydney Bears (U19s G)	14 – 38	Cronulla-Sutherland Sharks (U19s G)	Saturday, 21 February, 11:30am	Hills Grammar Oval	Aleksandr Fitzgerald
Sydney Roosters (U19s G)	52 – 6	St George Dragons (U19s G)	Saturday, 21 February, 11:30am	Woy Woy Oval	Ben Thompson
Illawarra Steelers (U19s G)	34 – 6	Manly Warringah Sea Eagles (U19s G)	Saturday, 21 February, 11:30am	WIN Stadium	William Flint
South Sydney Rabbitohs (U19s G)	0 – 24	Wests Tigers (U19s G)	Saturday, 21 February, 11:45am	Redfern Oval	Jack Catania
Canberra Raiders (U19s G)	0 – 36	Penrith Panthers (U19s G)	Saturday, 21 February, 12:30pm	Raiders Belconnen	James Fitzgerald
Newcastle Knights (U19s G)	50 – 8	Melbourne Storm (U19s G)	Saturday, 21 February, 1:30pm	Lakeside Sporting Complex	Riley Hayes
Canterbury-Bankstown Bulldogs (U19s G)	BYE	Parramatta Eels (U19s G)
Round 4
Cronulla-Sutherland Sharks (U19s G)	24 – 0	St George Dragons (U19s G)	Saturday, 28 February, 11:15am	Ocean Protect Stadium	William Flint
Canterbury-Bankstown Bulldogs (U19s G)	42 – 10	South Sydney Rabbitohs (U19s G)	Saturday, 28 February, 11:30am	Hammondville Oval	Tallon Irons
Sydney Roosters (U19s G)	32 – 16	Newcastle Knights (U19s G)	Saturday, 28 February, 12:00pm	Mascot Oval	Aleksandr Fitzgerald
Illawarra Steelers (U19s G)	12 – 22	Parramatta Eels (U19s G)	Saturday, 28 February, 12:30pm	James Hardie Centre of Excellence	Maisy Macarthur
Canberra Raiders (U19s G)	26 – 14	Melbourne Storm (U19s G)	Saturday, 28 February, 1:15pm	Raiders Belconnen	Jack Catania
North Sydney Bears (U19s G)	8 – 8	Penrith Panthers (U19s G)	Saturday, 28 February, 6:00pm	St Marys Leagues Stadium	Ben Thompson
Manly Warringah Sea Eagles (U19s G)	BYE	Wests Tigers (U19s G)
Round 5
Penrith Panthers (U19s G)	20 – 26	Canterbury-Bankstown Bulldogs (U19s G)	Saturday, 7 March, 11:30am	Blacktown International Sports Park	Aleksandr Fitzgerald
Parramatta Eels (U19s G)	32 – 14	North Sydney Bears (U19s G)	Saturday, 7 March, 12:00pm	Eric Tweedale Stadium	Maisy Macarthur
South Sydney Rabbitohs (U19s G)	8 – 28	Newcastle Knights (U19s G)	Saturday, 7 March, 12:15pm	Redfern Oval	Tallon Irons
Cronulla-Sutherland Sharks (U19s G)	18 – 14	Illawarra Steelers (U19s G)	Saturday, 7 March, 12:30pm	Cronulla High School	Toby Parrott
Canberra Raiders (U19s G)	52 – 6	Manly Warringah Sea Eagles (U19s G)	Saturday, 7 March, 1:30pm	Raiders Belconnen	Jack Catania
Melbourne Storm (U19s G)	18 – 18	Wests Tigers (U19s G)	Saturday, 7 March, 2:00pm	Seabrook Reserve	Kai Davenport
St George Dragons (U19s G)	BYE	Sydney Roosters (U19s G)
Round 6
St George Dragons (U19s G)	10 – 18	North Sydney Bears (U19s G)	Saturday, 14 March, 11:30am	Collegians Sports Stadium	Thomas Inness
Penrith Panthers (U19s G)	22 – 16	Newcastle Knights (U19s G)	Saturday, 14 March, 12:00pm	Blacktown International Sports Park	William Flint
South Sydney Rabbitohs (U19s G)	0 – 62	Parramatta Eels (U19s G)	Saturday, 14 March, 12:15pm	Redfern Oval	Ben Raymond
Melbourne Storm (U19s G)	6 – 46	Cronulla-Sutherland Sharks (U19s G)	Saturday, 14 March, 2:00pm	Casey Fields	William Roache
Canterbury-Bankstown Bulldogs (U19s G)	16 – 22	Illawarra Steelers (U19s G)	Saturday, 14 March, 3:30pm	Hammondville Oval	Jaylen Chasle
Sydney Roosters (U19s G)	38 – 12	Canberra Raiders (U19s G)	Saturday, 14 March, 4:30pm	Mascot Oval	James Fitzgerald
Manly Warringah Sea Eagles (U19s G)	6 – 34	Wests Tigers (U19s G)	Sunday, 15 March, 11:30am	Sydney Academy of Sport	Lachlan Bryant
Round 7
North Sydney Bears (U19s G)	0 – 60	Sydney Roosters (U19s G)	Saturday, 21 March, 11:30am	Aubrey Keech Reserve	Tallon Irons
St George Dragons (U19s G)	20 – 34	South Sydney Rabbitohs (U19s G)	Saturday, 21 March, 11:30am	Collegians Sports Stadium	Caitlin Sherry
Parramatta Eels (U19s G)	60 – 10	Manly Warringah Sea Eagles (U19s G)	Saturday, 21 March, 12:00pm	Eric Tweedale Stadium	Toby Parrott
Wests Tigers (U19s G)	8 – 20	Illawarra Steelers (U19s G)	Saturday, 21 March, 12:30pm	Kirkham Oval	Maisy Macarthur
Melbourne Storm (U19s G)	14 – 46	Canterbury-Bankstown Bulldogs (U19s G)	Saturday, 21 March, 2:00pm	Casey Fields	Achillies Ngaue
Newcastle Knights (U19s G)	BYE	Canberra Raiders (U19s G)
Cronulla-Sutherland Sharks (U19s G)	BYE	Penrith Panthers (U19s G)
Round 8
Newcastle Knights (U19s G)	26 – 14	Canberra Raiders (U19s G)	Saturday, 28 March, 12:00pm	Cessnock Sportsground	Ben Raymond
Parramatta Eels (U19s G)	30 – 6	Sydney Roosters (U19s G)	Saturday, 28 March, 12:00pm	Eric Tweedale Stadium	Thomas Inness
Penrith Panthers (U19s G)	24 – 22	Cronulla-Sutherland Sharks (U19s G)	Saturday, 28 March, 12:00pm	St Marys Leagues Stadium	Lachlan Bryant
Manly Warringah Sea Eagles (U19s G)	10 – 32	St George Dragons (U19s G)	Sunday, 29 March, 11:30am	Sydney Academy of Sport	Stuart Halsey
Wests Tigers (U19s G)	12 – 22	Canterbury-Bankstown Bulldogs (U19s G)	Sunday, 29 March, 3:00pm	Leichhardt Oval	Jaylen Chasle
North Sydney Bears (U19s G)	BYE	South Sydney Rabbitohs (U19s G)
Illawarra Steelers (U19s G)	BYE	Melbourne Storm (U19s G)
Round 9 (Easter Round)
Cronulla-Sutherland Sharks (U19s G)	22 – 10	Canberra Raiders (U19s G)	Friday, 3 April, 1:45pm	Ocean Protect Stadium	Tallon Irons
Parramatta Eels (U19s G)	24 – 22	Canterbury-Bankstown Bulldogs (U19s G)	Saturday, 4 April, 11:30am	James Hardie Centre of Excellence	Josh Leigh
North Sydney Bears (U19s G)	6 – 62	Newcastle Knights (U19s G)	Saturday, 4 April, 12:00pm	Hills Grammar Oval	Jack Catania
Illawarra Steelers (U19s G)	32 – 10	Melbourne Storm (U19s G)	Saturday, 4 April, 1:20pm	Collegians Sports Stadium	Thomas Inness
Wests Tigers (U19s G)	6 – 32	Sydney Roosters (U19s G)	Saturday, 4 April, 3:00pm	Leichhardt Oval	Maisy Macarthur
St George Dragons (U19s G)	4 – 44	Penrith Panthers (U19s G)	Sunday, 5 April, 11:30am	Jubilee Stadium	Toby Parrott
Manly Warringah Sea Eagles (U19s G)	0 – 0*	South Sydney Rabbitohs (U19s G)	N/A
Finals Series
Qualifying & Elimination Finals
Sydney Roosters (U19s G)	V	Cronulla-Sutherland Sharks (U19s G)	11/12 April	TBA	TBA
Parramatta Eels (U19s G)	V	Canterbury-Bankstown Bulldogs (U19s G)	11/12 April	TBA	TBA
Penrith Panthers (U19s G)	V	Wests Tigers (U19s G)	11/12 April	TBA	TBA
Newcastle Knights (U19s G)	V	Illawarra Steelers (U19s G)	11/12 April	TBA	TBA
Semi-Finals
QF1 Loser	V	EF1 Winner	18/19 April	TBA	TBA
QF2 Loser	V	EF2 Winner	18/19 April	TBA	TBA
Preliminary Finals
QF2 Winner	V	SF1 Winner	25/26 April	TBA	TBA
QF1 Winner	V	SF2 Winner	25/26 April	TBA	TBA
Grand Final
PF1 Winner	V	PF2 Winner	2/3 May	TBA	TBA

=== Grand Final ===
Qualifying & Elimination Finals
1	Sydney
4	Cronulla-Sutherland
5	Penrith
8	Wests
6	Newcastle
7	Illawarra
2	Parramatta
3	Canterbury-Bankstown

Semi-Finals
1/4
5/8
2/3
6/7

Preliminary Finals
1/4
2/3/6/7
2/3
1/4/5/8

Grand Final

2026 Tarsha Gale Cup Grand Final

2/3 May 2026
TBA

PF1 Winner	v	PF2 Winner

TBA

== Laurie Daley Cup ==
2026 SLE Laurie Daley Cup
- Duration: 31 January – 28 March 2026
- Teams: 10
- Broadcast partners: Streaming; BarTV Sports (All Matches)

The Laurie Daley Cup (named the SLE Laurie Daley Cup for sponsorship reasons) is a regional representative competition for male players in the older teenage age bracket, drawing its teams from country and regional New South Wales. Named after former New South Wales captain Laurie Daley, it forms part of the NSWRL's Country Rugby League pathway structure alongside the SLE Andrew Johns Cup.

=== Teams ===
==== Club Changes ====
- Illawarra-South Coast Dragons renamed to Illawarra-South Coast Steelers for 2026.

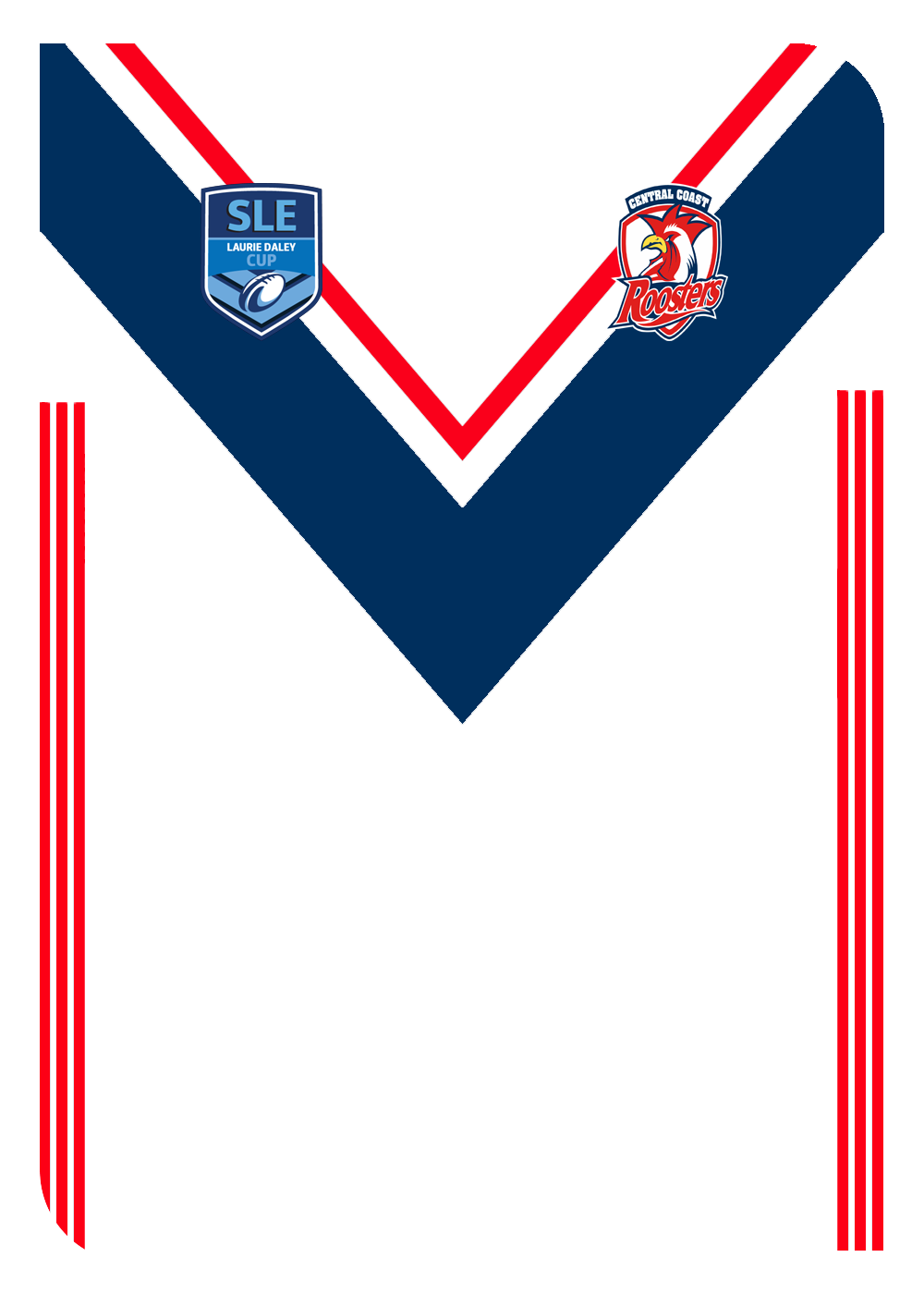
Central Coast; Roosters Ground: Woy Woy Oval City/Suburb: Woy Woy (Woy Woy) Head coach: TBA

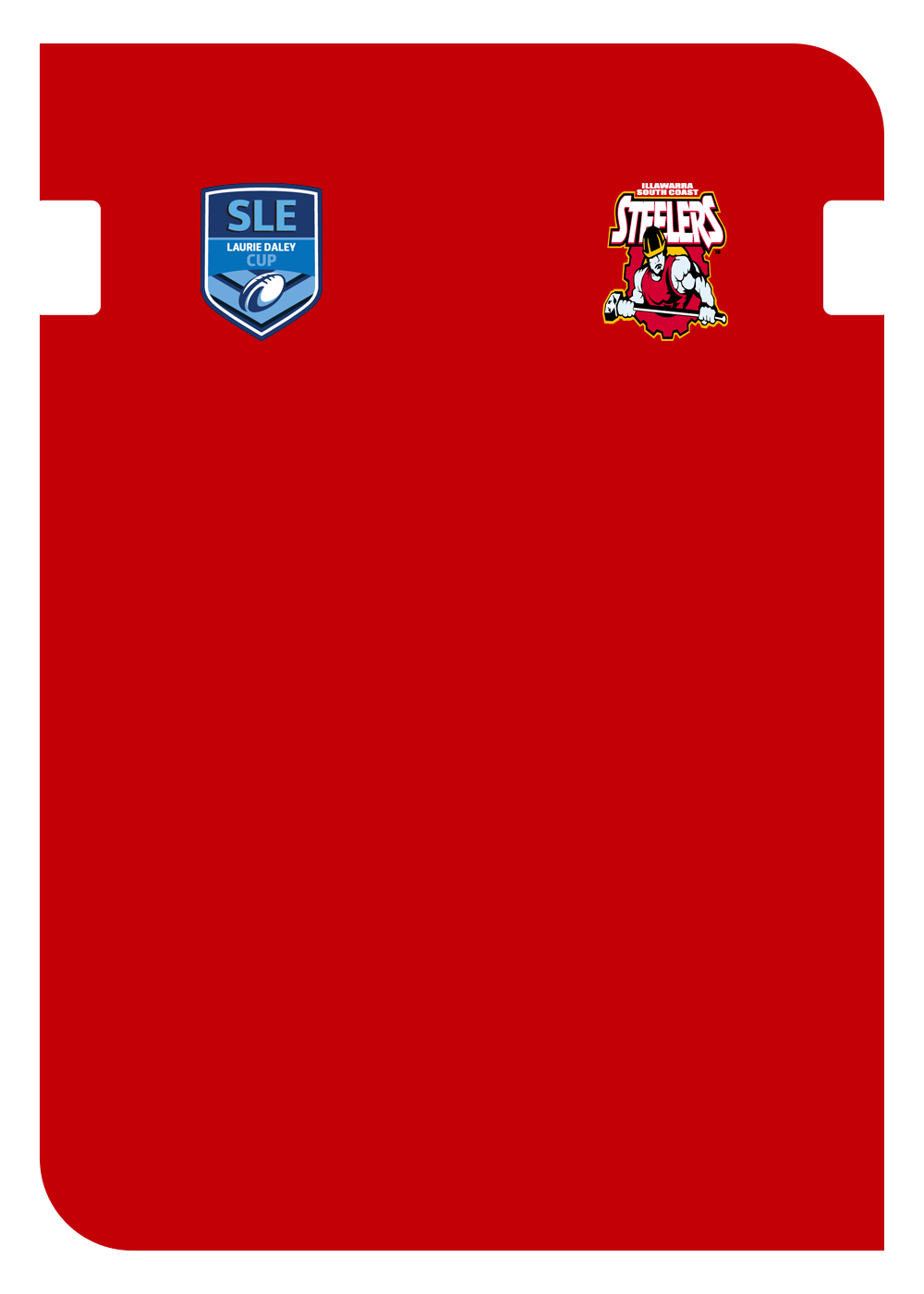
Illawarra-South Coast; Steelers Ground: Collegians Sports Stadium City/Suburb: Wollongong (Figtree) Head coach: TBA

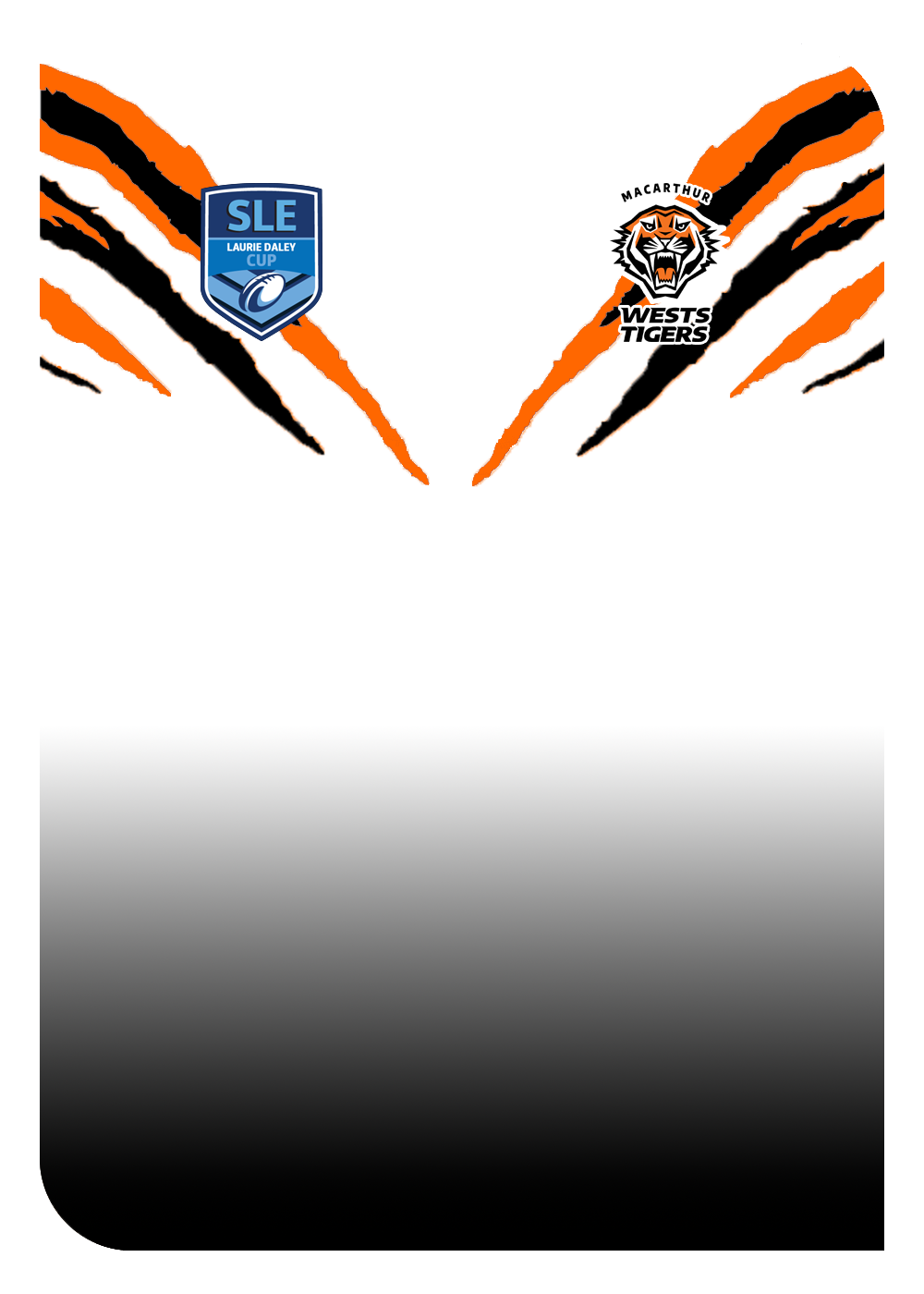
Macarthur-Wests; Tigers Ground: Kirkham Oval City/Suburb: Sydney (Elderslie) Head coach: TBA

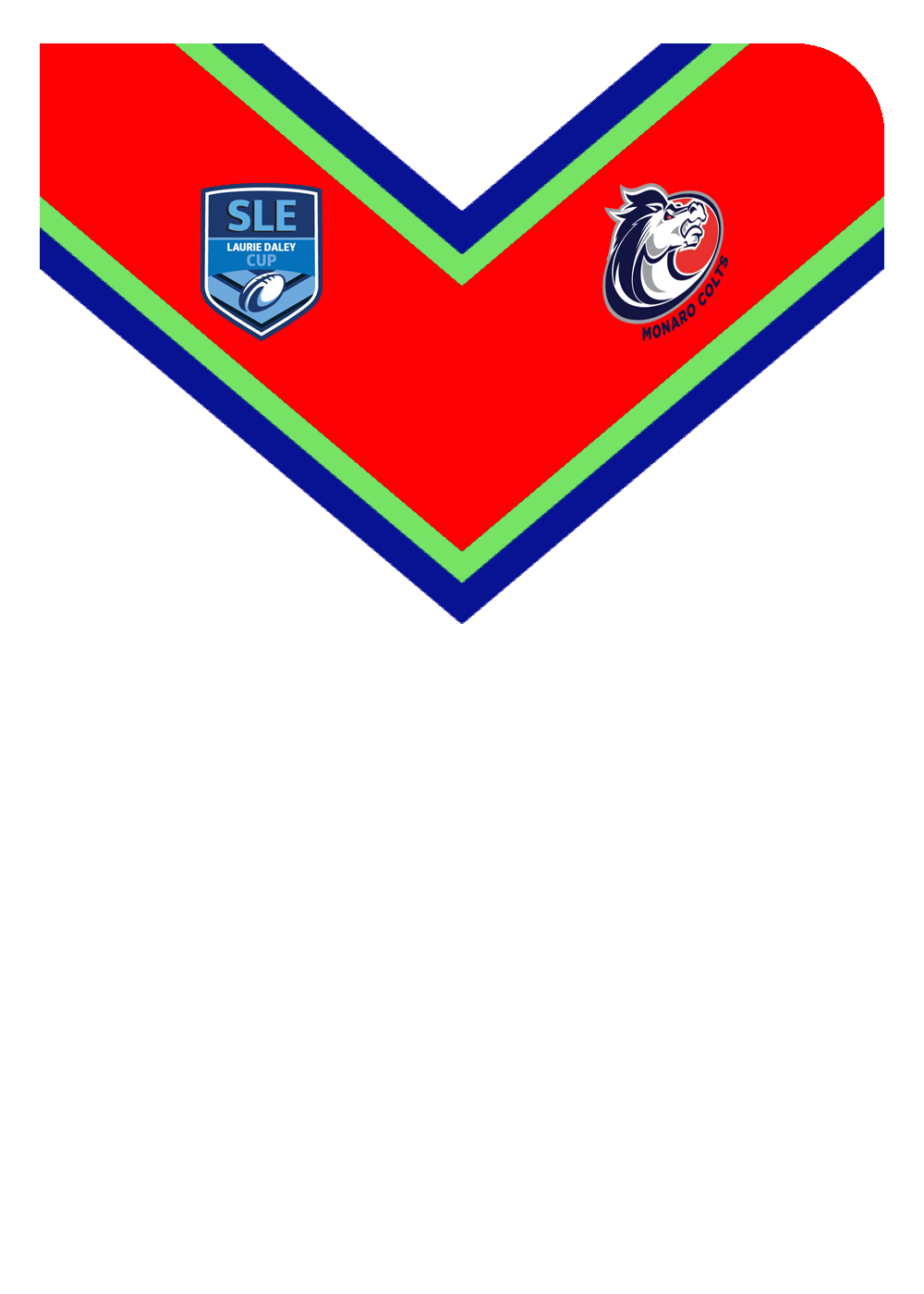
Monaro; Colts Ground: Seiffert Oval City/Suburb: Queanbeyan (Queanbeyan East) Head coach: TBA

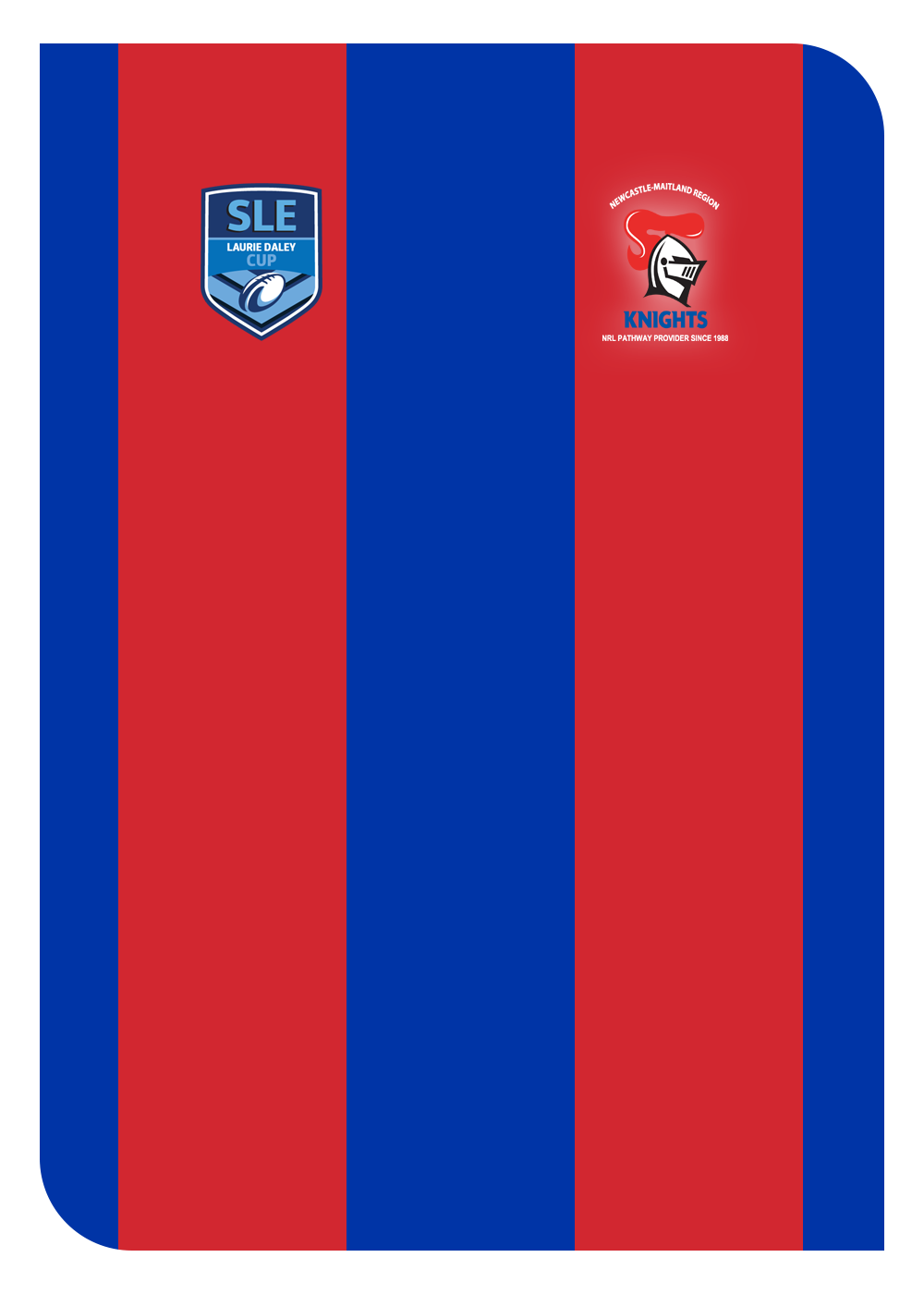
Newcastle-Maitland Region; Knights Ground: Lakeside Sporting Complex City/Suburb: Raymond Terrace Head coach: TBA

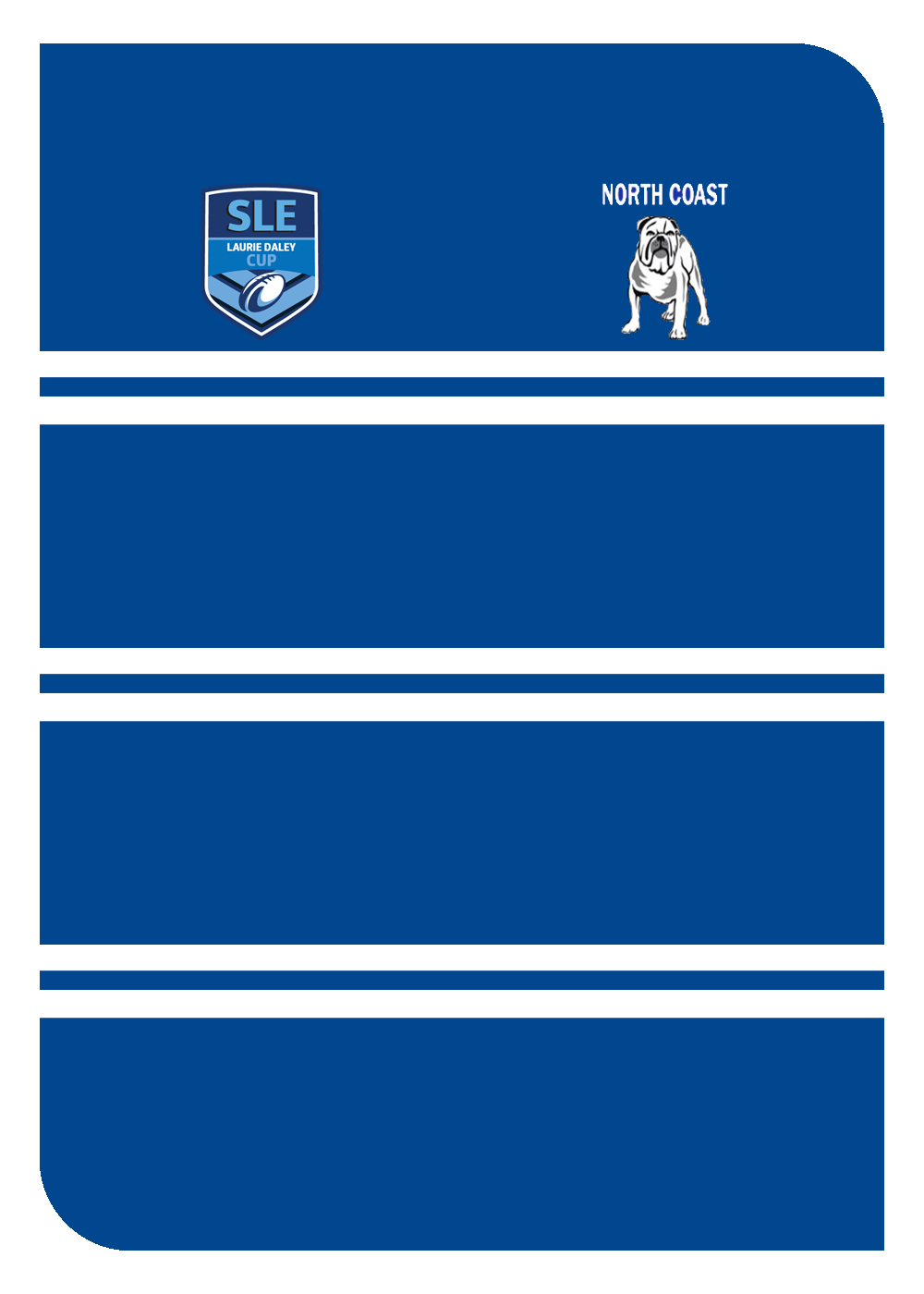
North Coast; Bulldogs Ground: Port Macquarie Regional Stadium City/Suburb: Port Macquarie Head coach: TBA

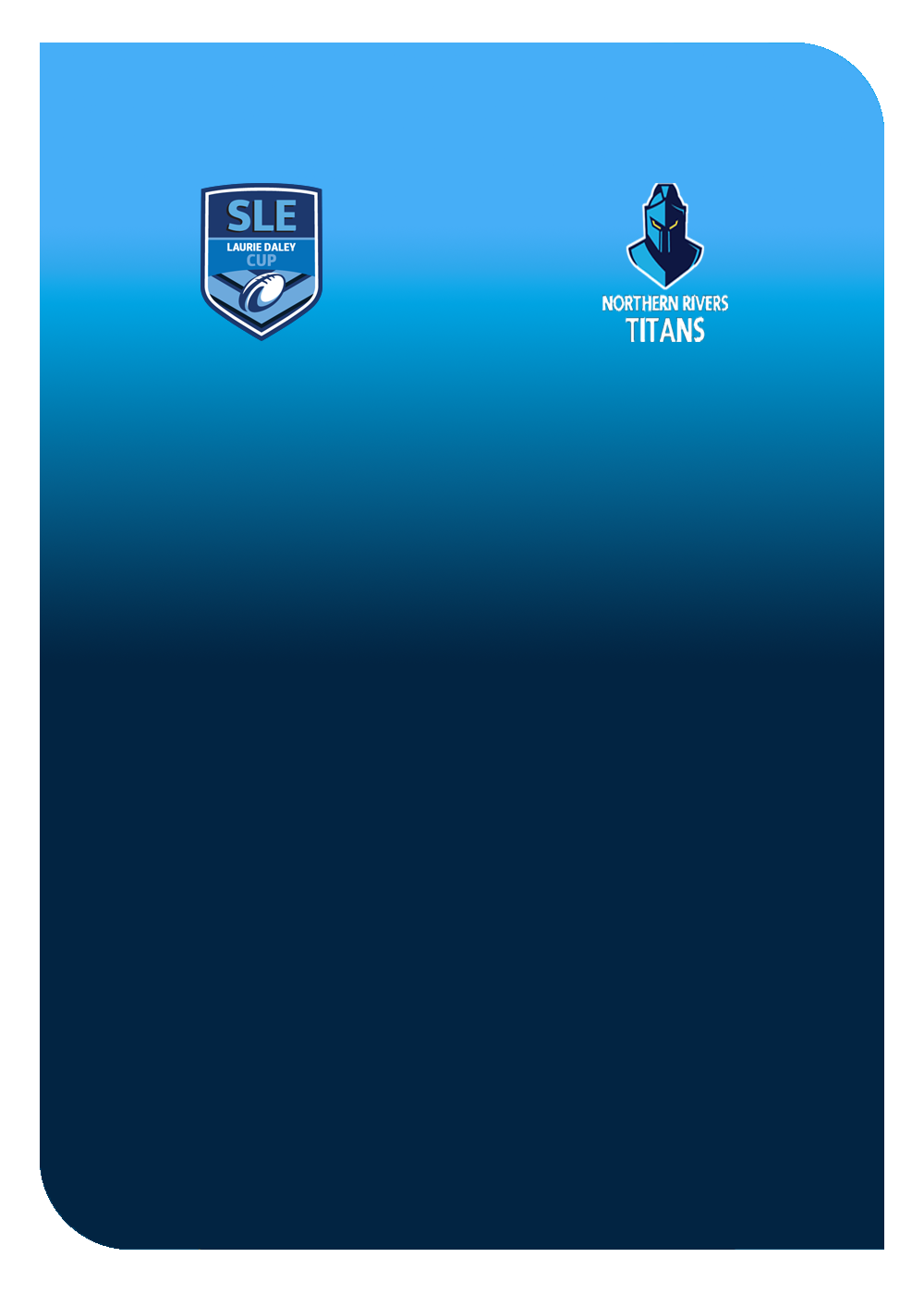
Northern Rivers; Titans Ground: Crozier Field City/Suburb: Lismore (Lismore) Head coach: TBA

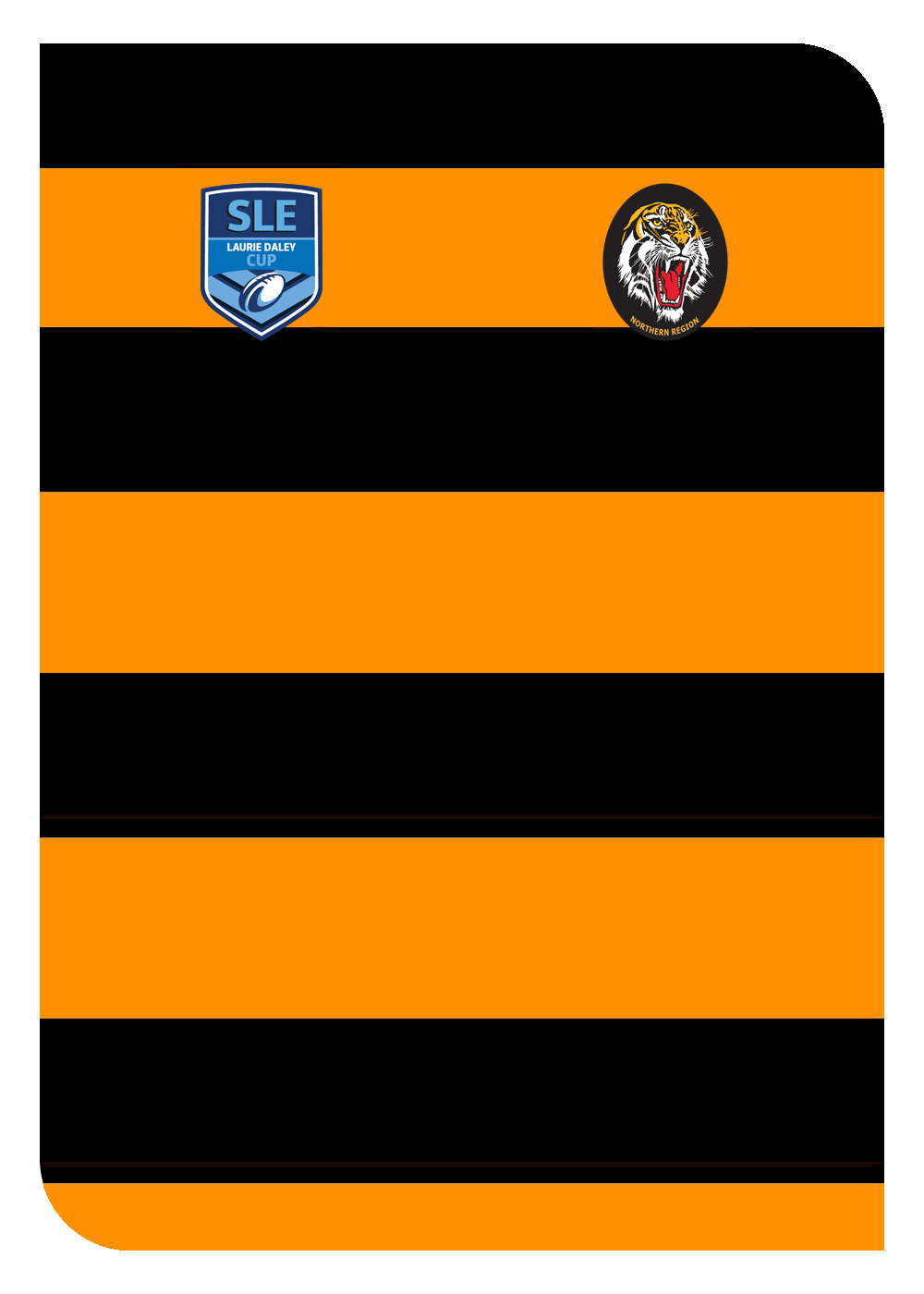
Northern; Tigers Ground: Scully Park City/Suburb: Tamworth (West Tamworth) Head coach: TBA

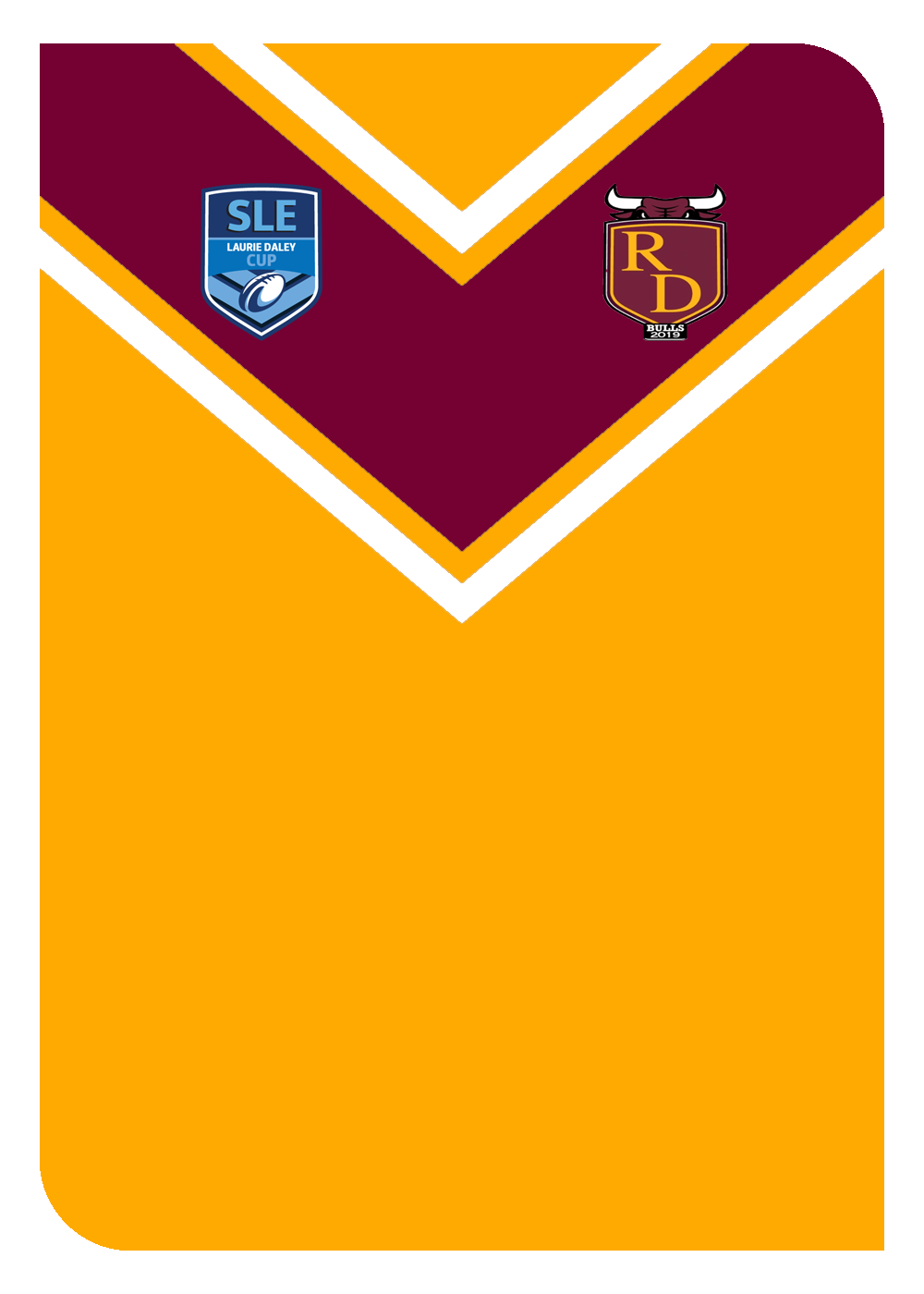
Riverina; Bulls Ground: GeoHex Park City/Suburb: Wagga Wagga (East Wagga Wagga) Head coach: TBA

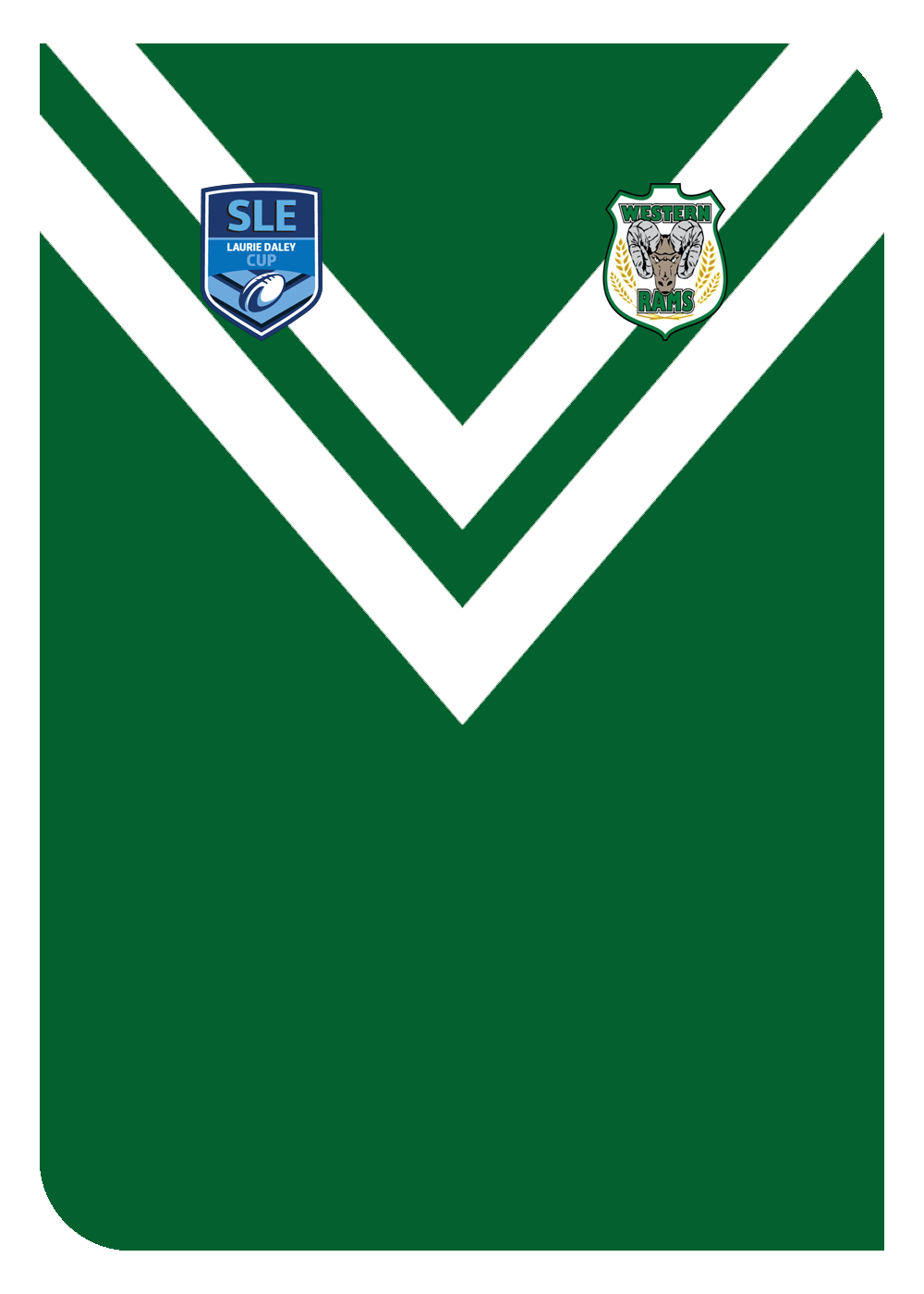
Western; Rams Ground: Carrington Park City/Suburb: Bathurst (Bathurst) Head coach: TBA

=== Ladder ===
Northern Conference

Pos	Team	Pld	W	D	L	B	PF	PA	PD	Pts	Qualification
1	Northern Rivers Titans (U18s)	5	4	0	1	1	134	82	+52	10	Semi-Finals
2	Newcastle-Maitland Region Knights (U18s)	5	4	0	1	1	104	62	+42	10	Semi-Finals
3	Central Coast Roosters (U18s)	5	2	1	2	1	158	122	+36	7	
4	North Coast Bulldogs (U18s)	5	2	1	2	1	124	126	–2	7	
5	Northern Tigers (U18s)	5	1	0	4	1	66	144	–78	4	

Updated to match(es) played on unknown. Source:
Rules for classification: 1) points; 2) point difference; 3) points scored

Southern Conference

Pos	Team	Pld	W	D	L	B	PF	PA	PD	Pts	Qualification
1	Macarthur-Wests Tigers (U18s)	5	5	0	0	1	224	44	+180	12	Semi-Finals
2	Illawarra-South Coast Steelers (U18s)	5	3	0	2	1	112	102	+10	8	Semi-Finals
3	Monaro Colts (U18s)	5	2	0	3	1	118	144	–26	6	
4	Western Rams (U18s)	5	1	0	4	1	106	216	-110	4	
5	Riverina Bulls (U18s)	5	0	0	5	1	96	200	-104	2	

Updated to match(es) played on unknown. Source:
Rules for classification: 1) points; 2) point difference; 3) points scored

==== Ladder Progression ====
- Numbers highlighted in green indicate that the team finished the round inside the top 2.
- Numbers highlighted in red indicates the team finished last place on the ladder in that round.
- Underlined numbers indicate that the team had a bye during that round.

Pos	Team	1	2	3	4	5	6
Northern Conference
1	Northern Rivers Titans (U18s)	2	4	4	6	8	10
2	Newcastle-Maitland Region Knights (U18s)	2	4	6	6	8	10
3	Central Coast Roosters (U18s)	2	4	6	7	7	7
4	North Coast Bulldogs (U18s)	0	0	2	3	5	7
5	Northern Tigers (U18s)	2	2	2	4	4	4
Southern Conference
1	Macarthur-Wests Tigers (U18s)	2	4	6	8	10	12
2	Illawarra-South Coast Steelers (U18s)	0	2	4	6	8	8
3	Monaro Colts (U18s)	0	2	2	2	4	6
4	Western Rams (U18s)	0	0	2	4	4	4
5	Riverina Bulls (U18s)	0	0	0	0	0	2

Season Results:

Home	Score	Away	Match Information
Home	Score	Away	Date and Time	Venue	Referee	Video
Round 1 (Magic Round)
Monaro Colts (U18s)	16 – 34	Northern Rivers Titans (U18s)	Saturday, 31 January, 12:10pm	Seiffert Oval	Stuart Halsey
Macarthur-Wests Tigers (U18s)	30 – 12	North Coast Bulldogs (U18s)	Saturday, 31 January, 12:10pm	David Campese Oval	Callum Rigby
Northern Tigers (U18s)	26 – 24	Riverina Bulls (U18s)	Saturday, 31 January, 12:10pm	Pirtek Park	Nicholas Willer
Central Coast Roosters (U18s)	58 – 12	Western Rams (U18s)	Saturday, 31 January, 1:30pm	David Campese Oval	Ben Raymond
Newcastle-Maitland Region Knights (U18s)	6 – 4	Illawarra-South Coast Steelers (U18s)	Saturday, 31 January, 2:50pm	Pirtek Park	Callum Richardson
Round 2
Central Coast Roosters (U18s)	36 – 12	Northern Tigers (U18s)	Saturday, 7 February, 11:20am	Woy Woy Oval	Callum Richardson
North Coast Bulldogs (U18s)	12 – 20	Newcastle-Maitland Region Knights (U18s)	Saturday, 7 February, 11:40am	Port Macquarie Regional Stadium	Lachlan Gillies
Western Rams (U18s)	18 – 24	Illawarra-South Coast Steelers (U18s)	Saturday, 7 February, 2:30pm	Tony Luchetti Sportsground	Stuart Halsey
Riverina Bulls (U18s)	0 – 52	Macarthur-Wests Tigers (U18s)	Sunday, 8 February, 11:50am	GeoHex Park	Callum Rigby
Monaro Colts (U18s)	BYE	Northern Rivers Titans (U18s)
Round 3
Newcastle-Maitland Region Knights (U18s)	40 – 6	Northern Tigers (U18s)	Saturday, 14 February, 10:50am	Lakeside Sporting Complex	Ben Raymond
Northern Rivers Titans (U18s)	24 – 26	North Coast Bulldogs (U18s)	Saturday, 14 February, 11:20am	Crozier Field	Lachlan Gillies
Macarthur-Wests Tigers (U18s)	36 – 18	Monaro Colts (U18s)	Saturday, 14 February, 12:20pm	Kirkham Oval	Carter Spowert-Lehman
Illawarra-South Coast Steelers (U18s)	42 – 22	Riverina Bulls (U18s)	Sunday, 15 February, 11:20am	Centenary Field	Rami Abu-Mansour
Central Coast Roosters (U18s)	BYE	Western Rams (U18s)
Round 4
Newcastle-Maitland Region Knights (U18s)	18 – 28	Northern Rivers Titans (U18s)	Saturday, 21 February, 10:50am	Lakeside Sporting Complex	Logan Neilsen
North Coast Bulldogs (U18s)	30 – 30	Central Coast Roosters (U18s)	Saturday, 21 February, 11:20am	Port Macquarie Regional Stadium	Lachlan Bryant
Western Rams (U18s)	52 – 28	Riverina Bulls (U18s)	Saturday, 21 February, 11:20am	Jock Colley Oval	Carter Spowert-Lehman
Illawarra-South Coast Steelers (U18s)	34 – 16	Monaro Colts (U18s)	Saturday, 21 February, 2:30pm	WIN Stadium	Jaylen Chasle
Macarthur-Wests Tigers (U18s)	BYE	Northern Tigers (U18s)
Round 5
Macarthur-Wests Tigers (U18s)	66 – 6	Western Rams (U18s)	Saturday, 28 February, 11:20am	Kirkham Oval	Callum Rigby
Northern Rivers Titans (U18s)	48 – 22	Central Coast Roosters (U18s)	Saturday, 28 February, 11:20am	Crozier Field	Logan Neilsen
Northern Tigers (U18s)	22 – 44	North Coast Bulldogs (U18s)	Saturday, 28 February, 2:00pm	Scully Park	Lachlan Bryant
Riverina Bulls (U18s)	22 – 28	Monaro Colts (U18s)	Sunday, 1 March, 2:00pm	Laurie Daley Oval	Jaylen Chasle
Newcastle-Maitland Region Knights (U18s)	BYE	Illawarra-South Coast Steelers (U18s)
Round 6
Central Coast Roosters (U18s)	12 – 20	Newcastle-Maitland Region Knights (U18s)	Saturday, 7 March, 10:50am	Woy Woy Oval	Ben Raymond
Monaro Colts (U18s)	40 – 18	Western Rams (U18s)	Saturday, 7 March, 10:50am	Seiffert Oval	Rami Abu-Mansour
Illawarra-South Coast Steelers (U18s)	8 – 40	Macarthur-Wests Tigers (U18s)	Saturday, 7 March, 12:00pm	Collegians Sports Stadium	Jaylen Chasle
Northern Rivers Titans (U18s)	0* – 0	Northern Tigers (U18s)	N/A
Riverina Bulls (U18s)	BYE	North Coast Bulldogs (U18s)
Finals Series
Semi-Finals
Macarthur-Wests Tigers (U18s)	38 – 12	Newcastle-Maitland Region Knights (U18s)	Saturday, 21 March, 11:30am	Dudley Chesham Sports Ground	Rami Abu-Mansour
Northern Rivers Titans (U18s)	47 – 6	Illawarra-South Coast Steelers (U18s)	Sunday, 22 March, 11:40am	Crozier Field	Carter Spowert-Lehman
Grand Final
Northern Rivers Titans (U18s)	22 – 40	Macarthur-Wests Tigers (U18s)	Saturday, 28 March, 1:15pm	Port Macquarie Regional Stadium	Callum Rigby

=== Grand Final ===
Semi-Finals
1N	Northern Rivers	47
2S	Illawarra-South Coast	6
1S	Macarthur-Wests	38
2N	Newcastle-Maitland	12

Grand Final
Northern Rivers	22
Macarthur-Wests	40

2026 Laurie Daley Cup Grand Final

Saturday, 28 March 2026
1:15pm

Northern Rivers Titans (U18s)	22 – 40	Macarthur-Wests Tigers (U18s)

Port Macquarie Regional Stadium, Port Macquarie
Referee: Callum Rigby
Touch judges: Declan Fitzgerald & Luke Donovan

== Harold Matthews Cup ==
2026 UNE Harold Matthews Cup
- Duration: 7 February – 2/3 May 2026
- Teams: 17
- Broadcast partners: Streaming; BarTV Sports (All Matches)

The Harold Matthews Cup (named the UNE Harold Matthews Cup for sponsorship reasons) is a junior representative competition for younger teenage male players, featuring NSWRL and NRL pathway clubs. It serves as an early entry point into the elite pathways system, with many participants progressing into UNE SG Ball Cup and beyond.

=== Teams ===
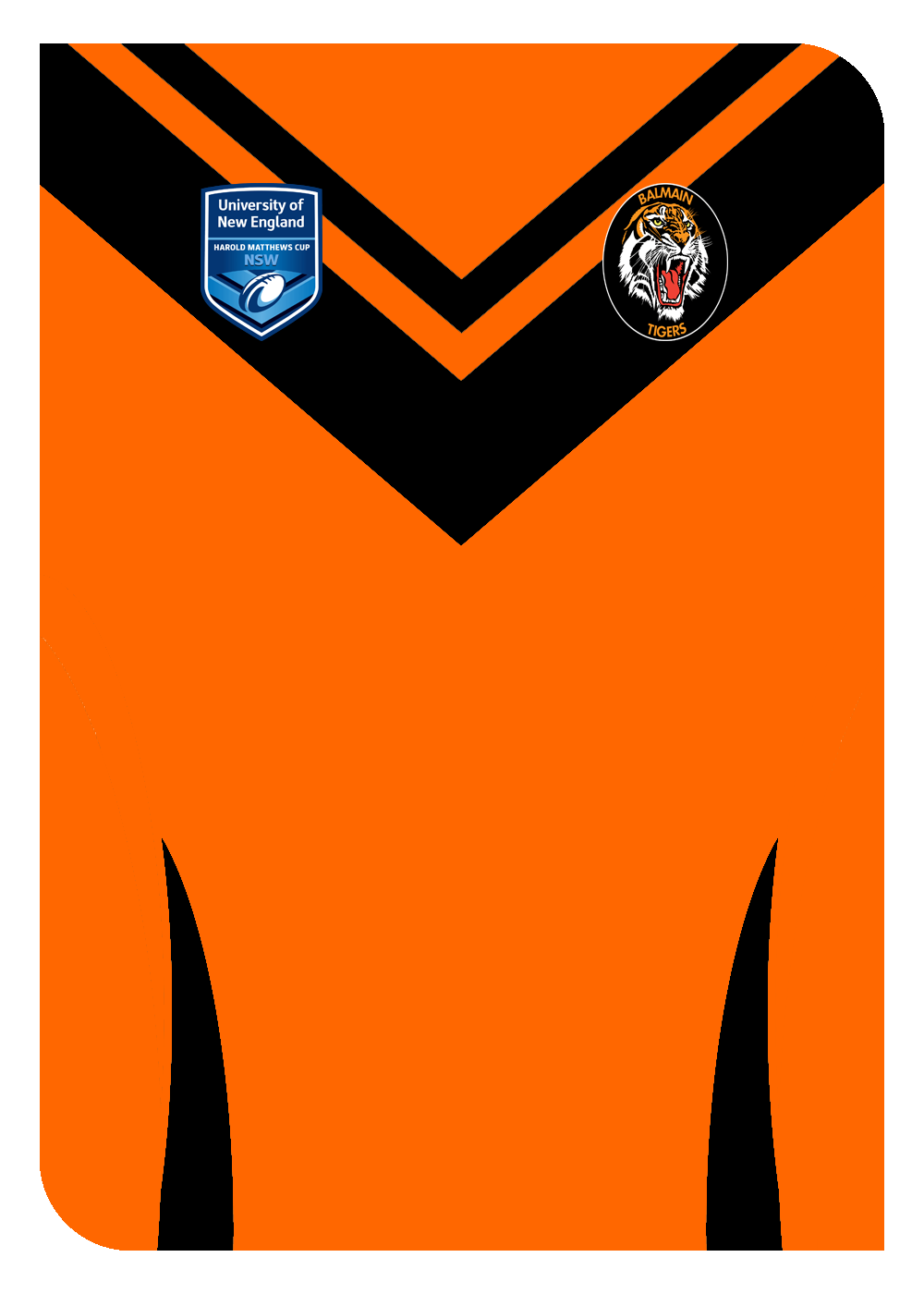
Balmain; Tigers Ground: Leichhardt Oval City/Suburb: Sydney (Leichhardt) Coach: TBA Affiliate: Wests Tigers

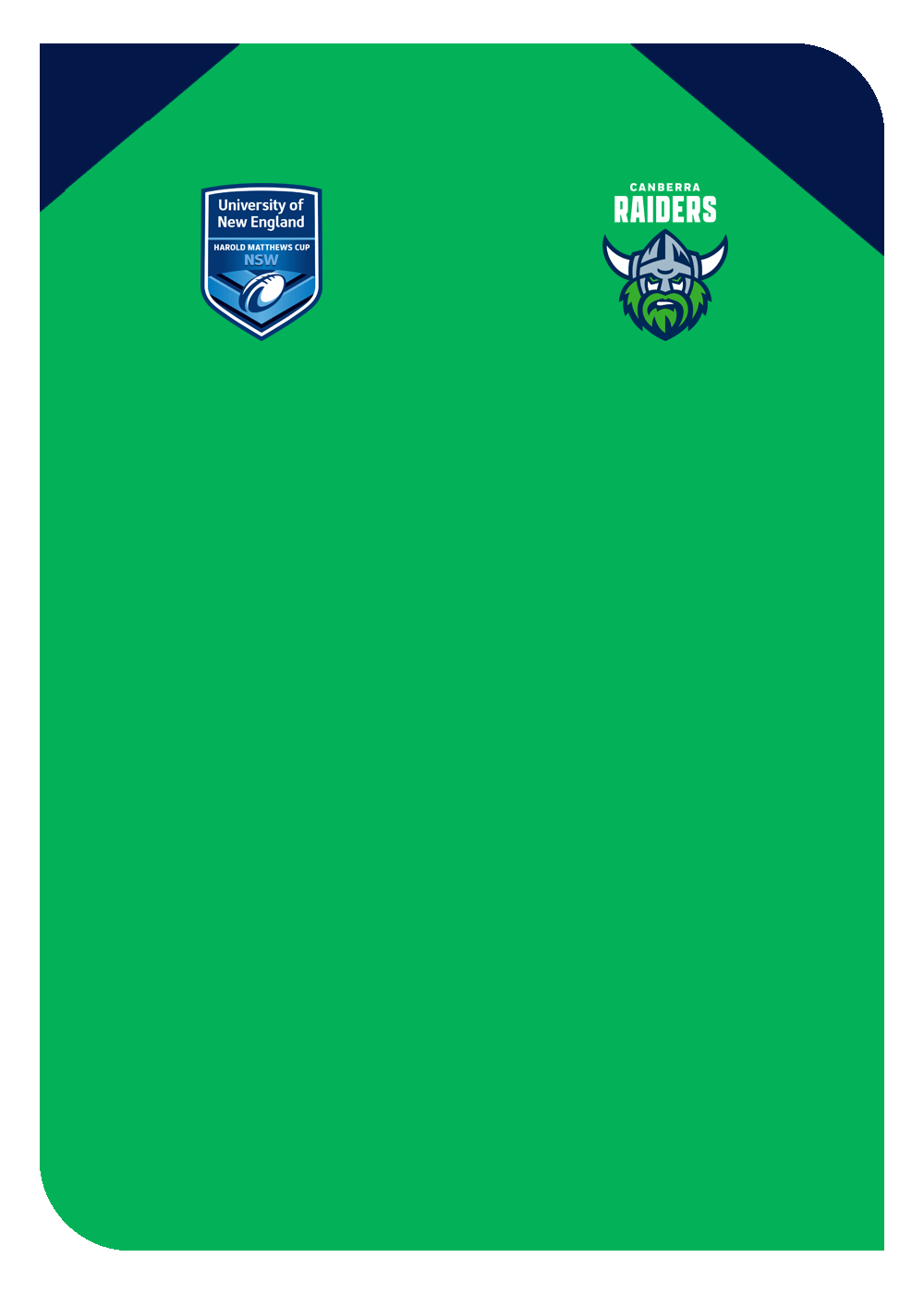
Canberra; Raiders Ground: Raiders Belconnen City/Suburb: Canberra (Holt) Coach: TBA Affiliate: Canberra Raiders

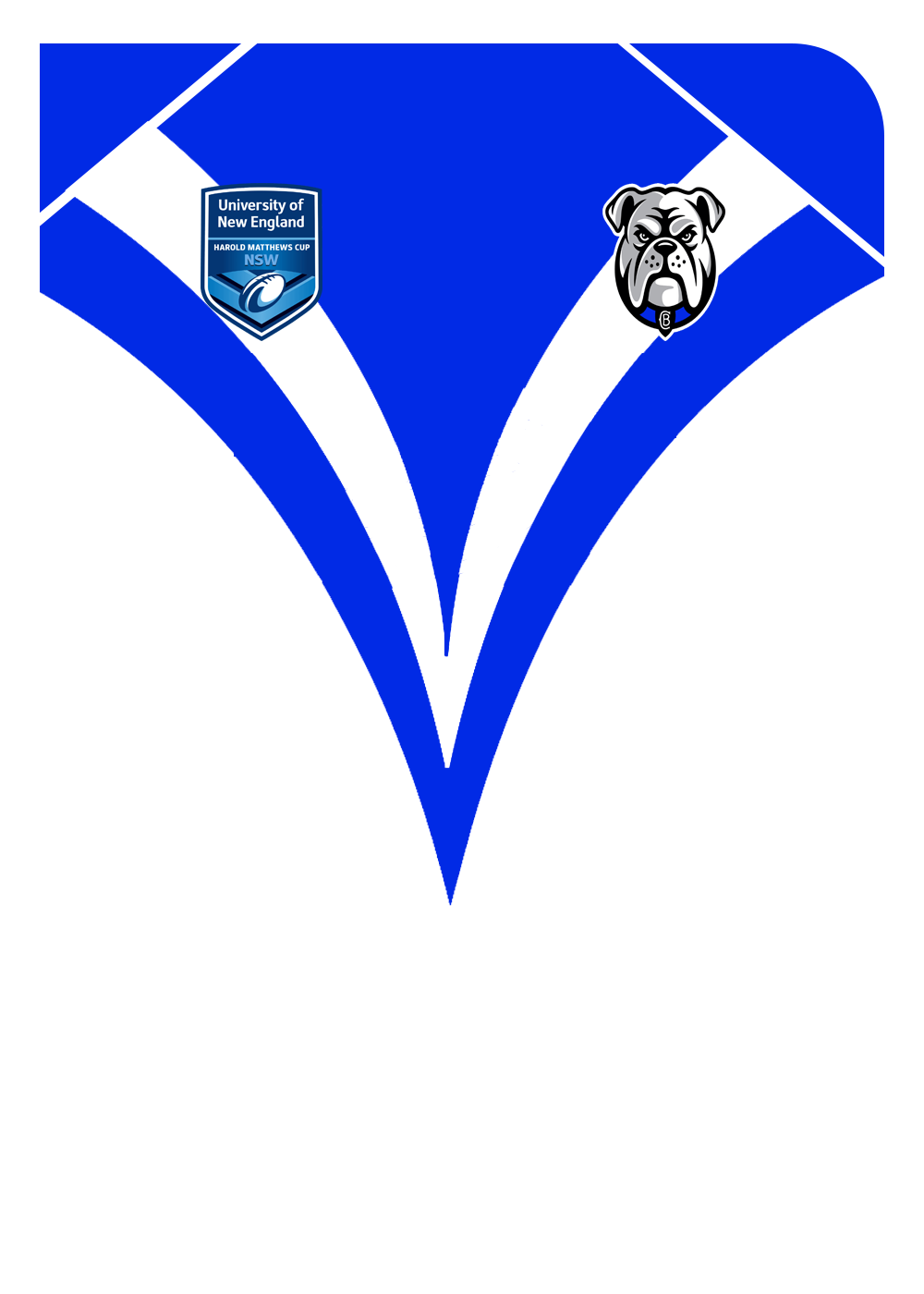
Canterbury-Bankstown; Bulldogs Ground: Belmore Sports Ground City/Suburb: Sydney (Belmore) Coach: TBA Affiliate: Canterbury-Bankstown Bulldogs

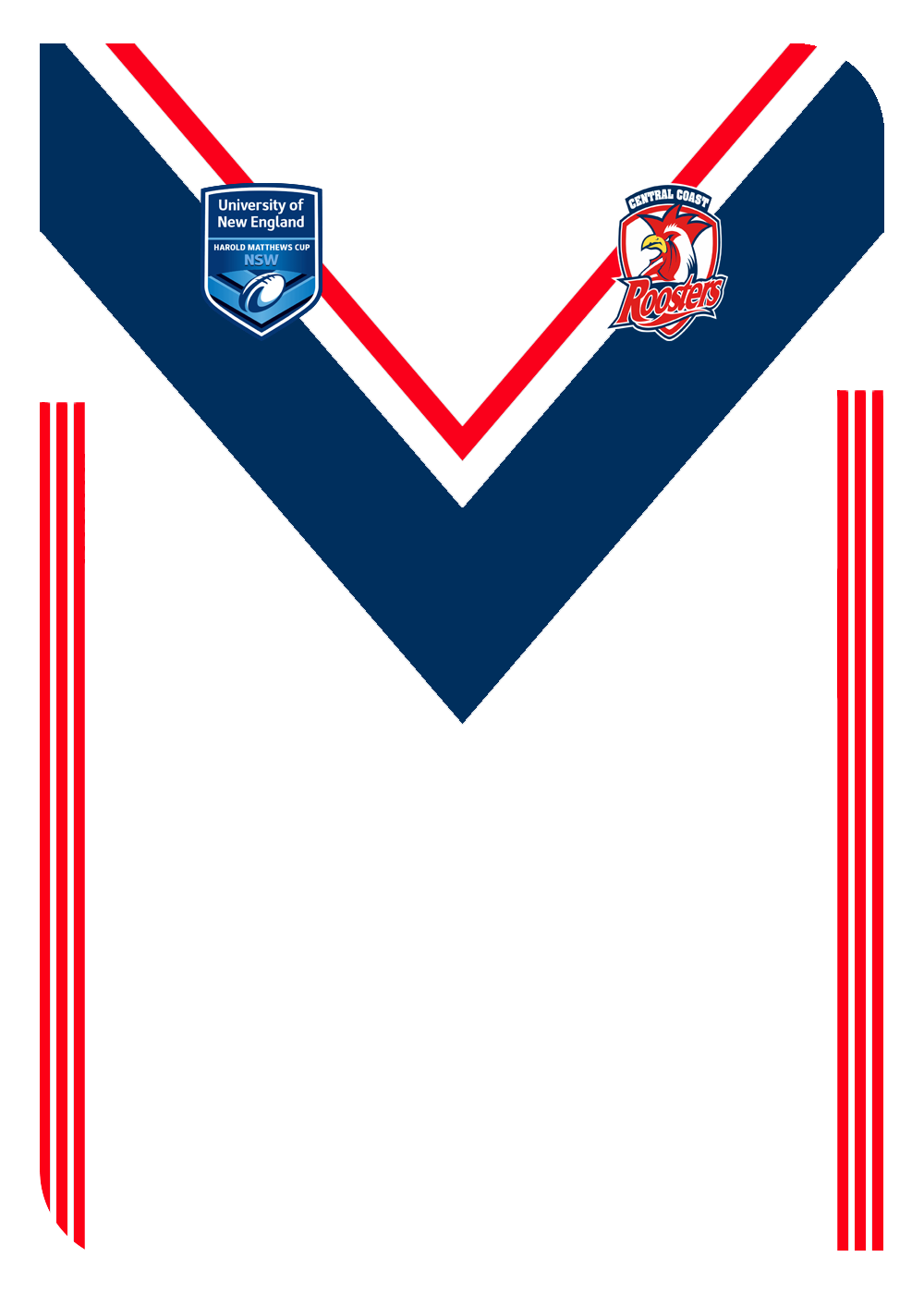
Central Coast; Roosters Ground: Woy Woy Oval City/Suburb: Woy Woy Coach: TBA Affiliate: Sydney Roosters

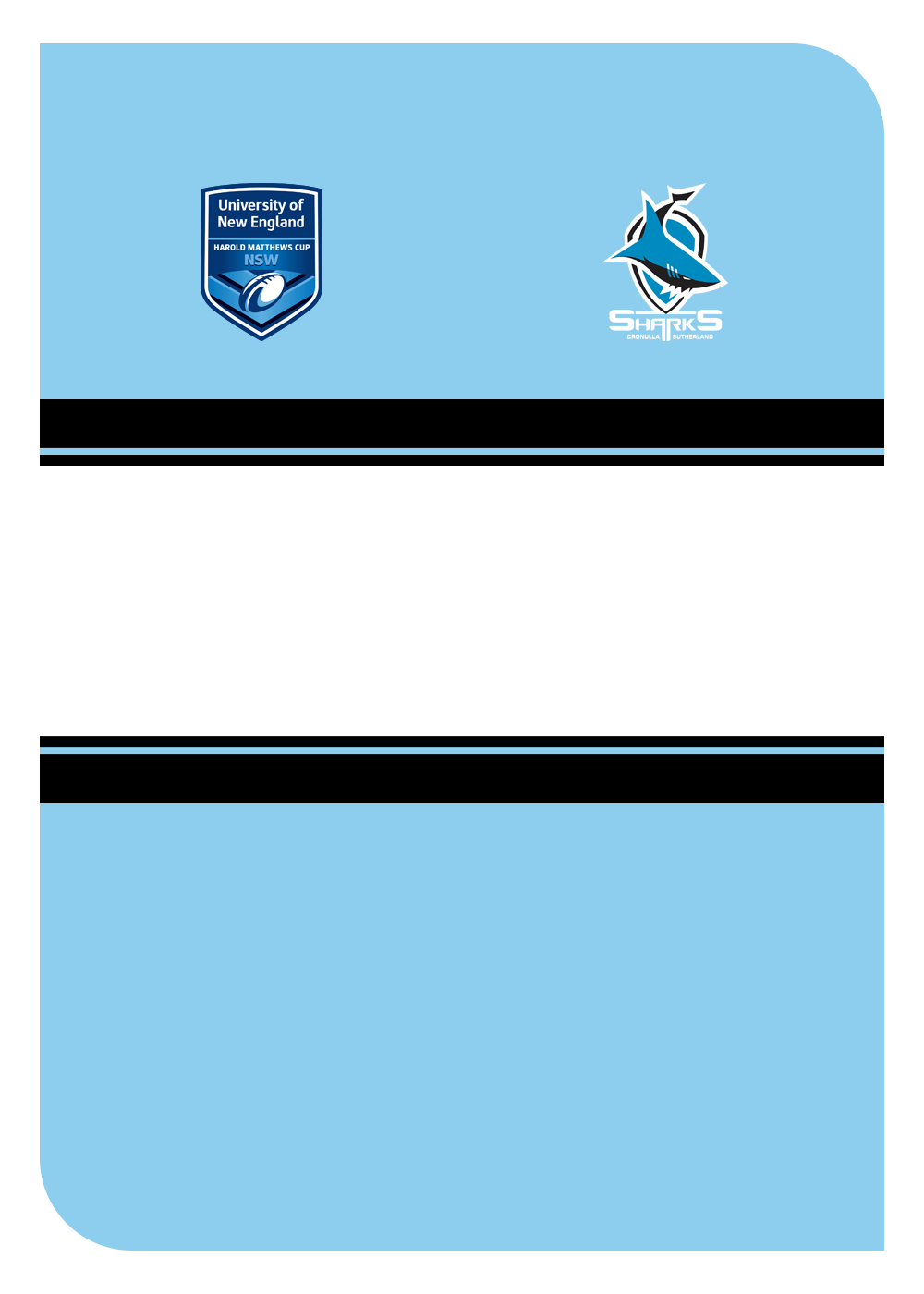
Cronulla-Sutherland; Sharks Ground: Ocean Protect Stadium City/Suburb: Sydney (Woolooware) Coach: TBA Affiliate: Cronulla-Sutherland Sharks

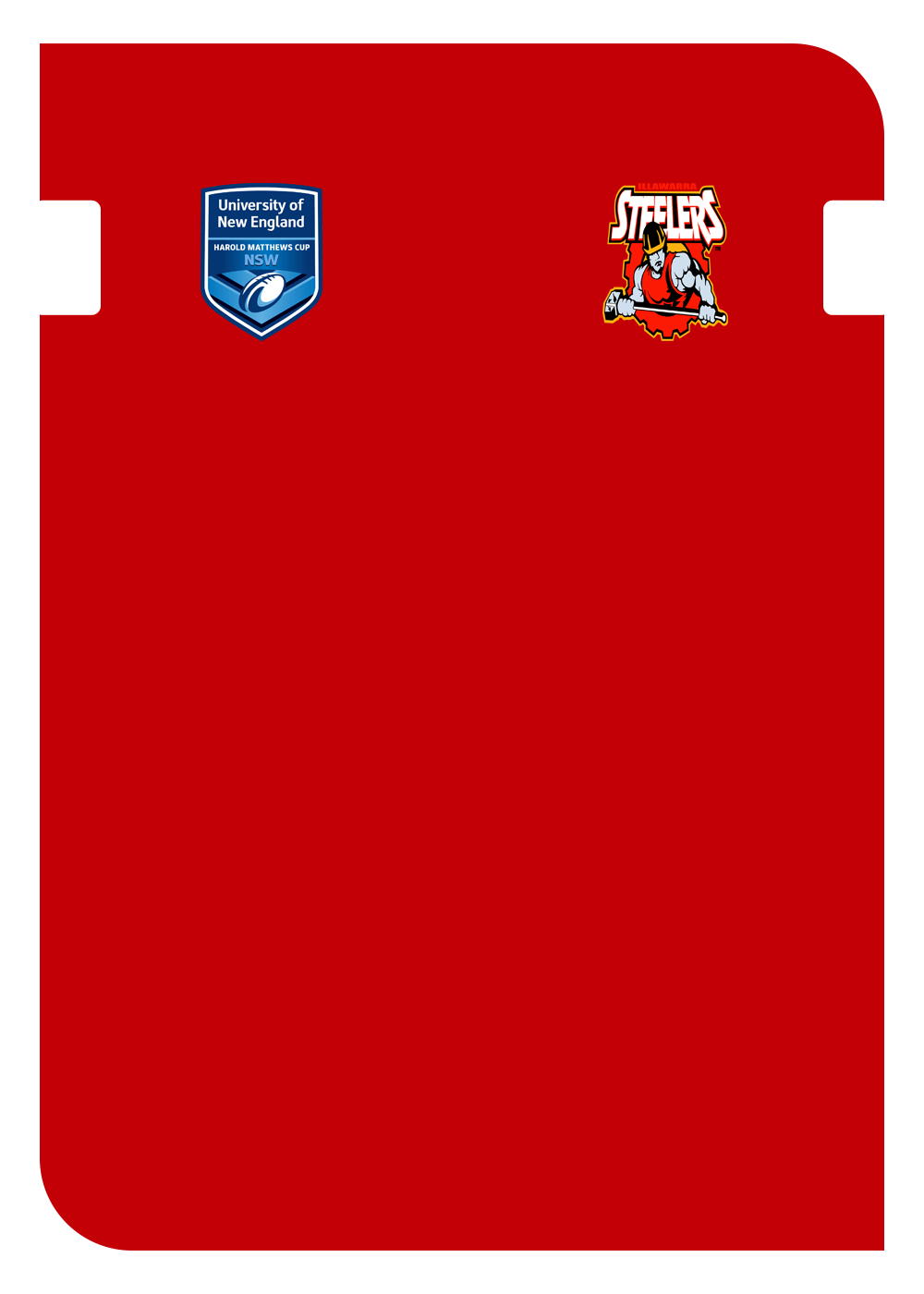
Illawarra; Steelers Ground: Collegians Sports Stadium City/Suburb: Wollongong (Figtree) Coach: TBA Affiliate: St George Illawarra Dragons

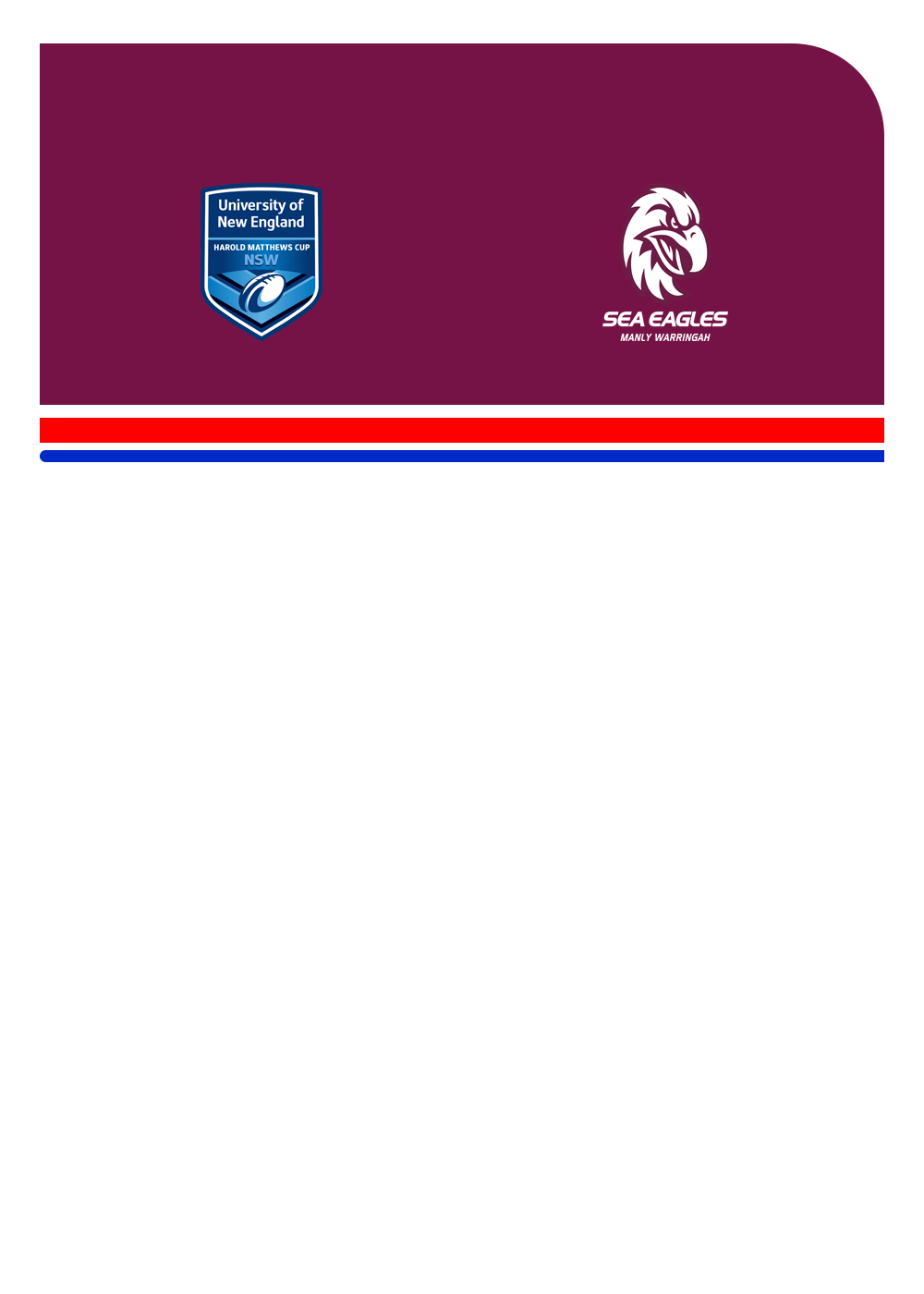
Manly Warringah; Sea Eagles Ground: 4 Pines Park City/Suburb: Sydney (Brookvale) Coach: TBA Affiliate: Manly Warringah Sea Eagles

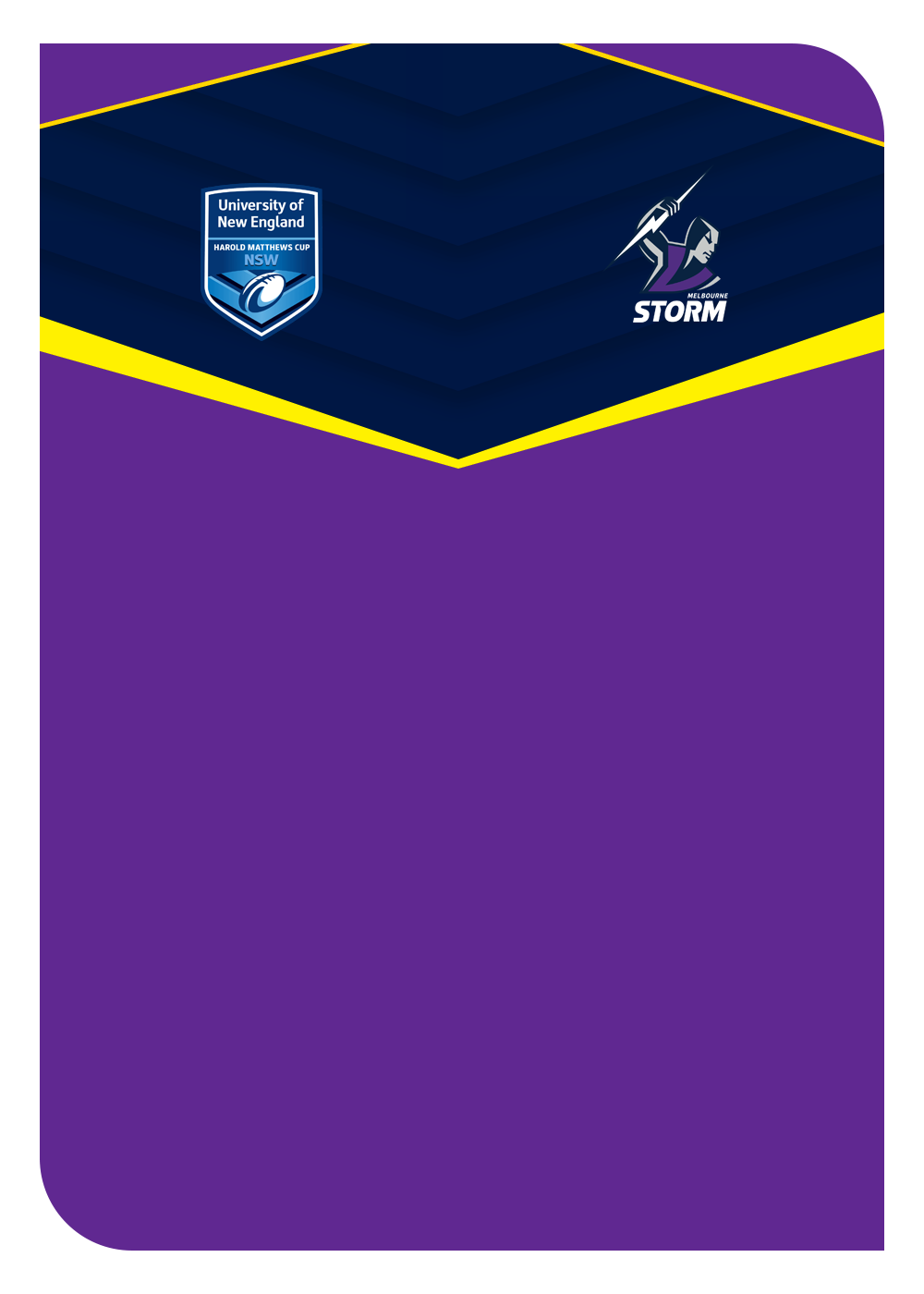
Melbourne; Storm Ground: Seabrook Reserve City/Suburb: Melbourne (Broadmeadows) Coach: TBA Affiliate: Melbourne Storm

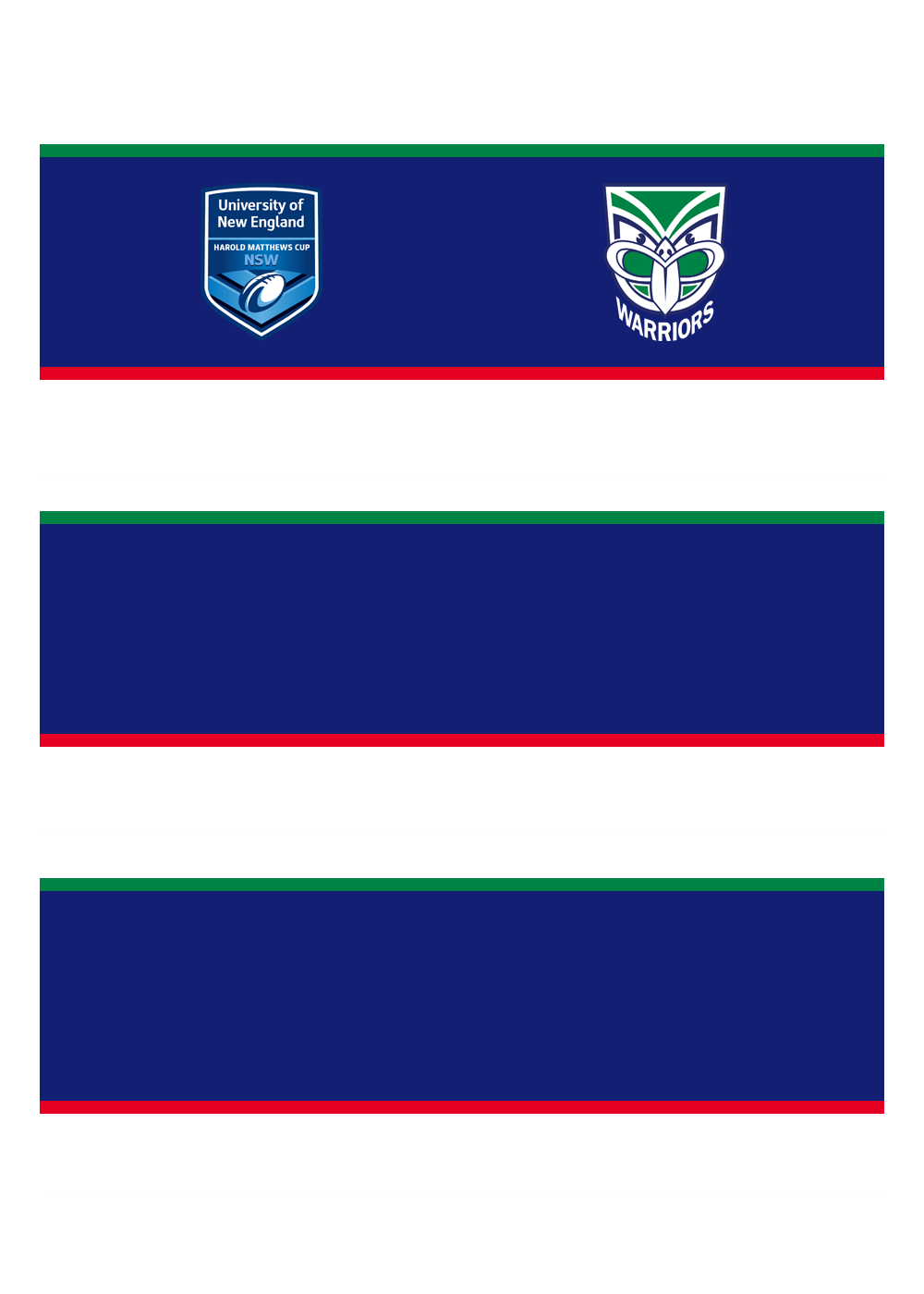
New Zealand; Warriors Ground: Bruce Pulman Park City/Suburb: Auckland (Takanini) Coach: TBA Affiliate: New Zealand Warriors

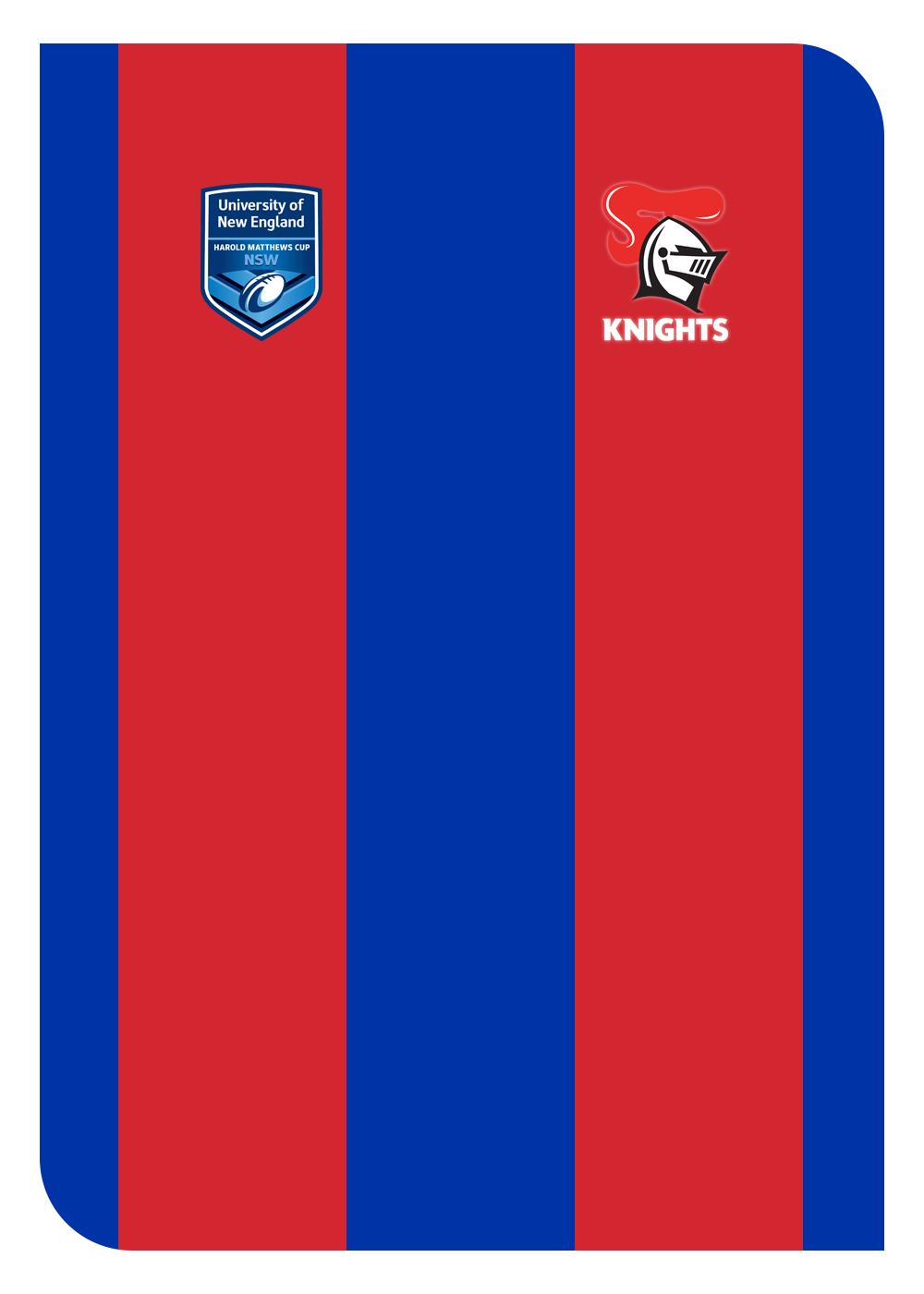
Newcastle; Knights Ground: Lakeside Sporting Complex City/Suburb: Raymond Terrace Coach: TBA Affiliate: Newcastle Knights

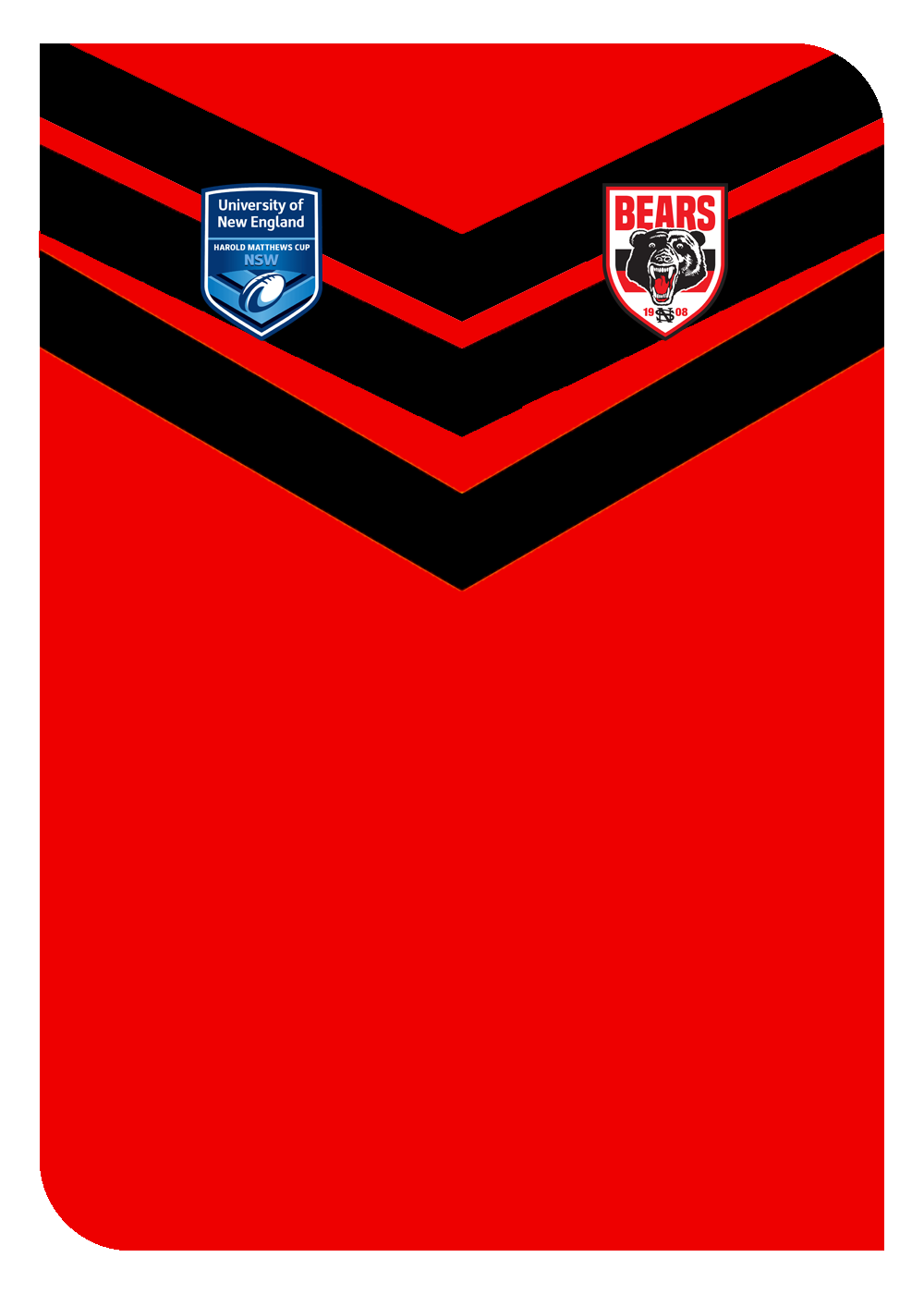
North Sydney; Bears Ground: Hills Grammar Oval City/Suburb: Sydney (Kenthurst) Coach: TBA Affiliate: Perth Bears

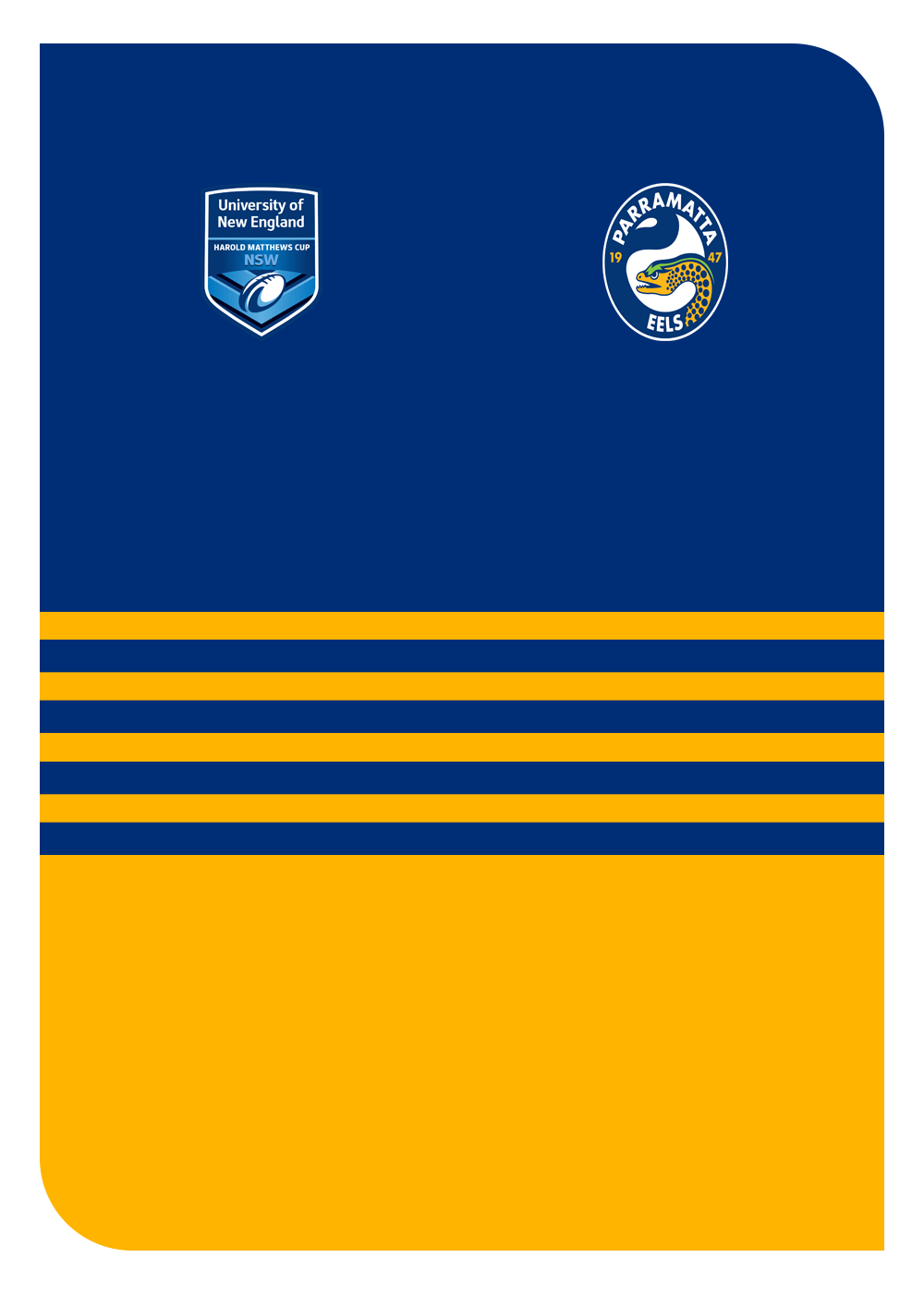
Parramatta; Eels Ground: James Hardie Centre of Excellence City/Suburb: Sydney (Kellyville) Coach: TBA Affiliate: Parramatta Eels

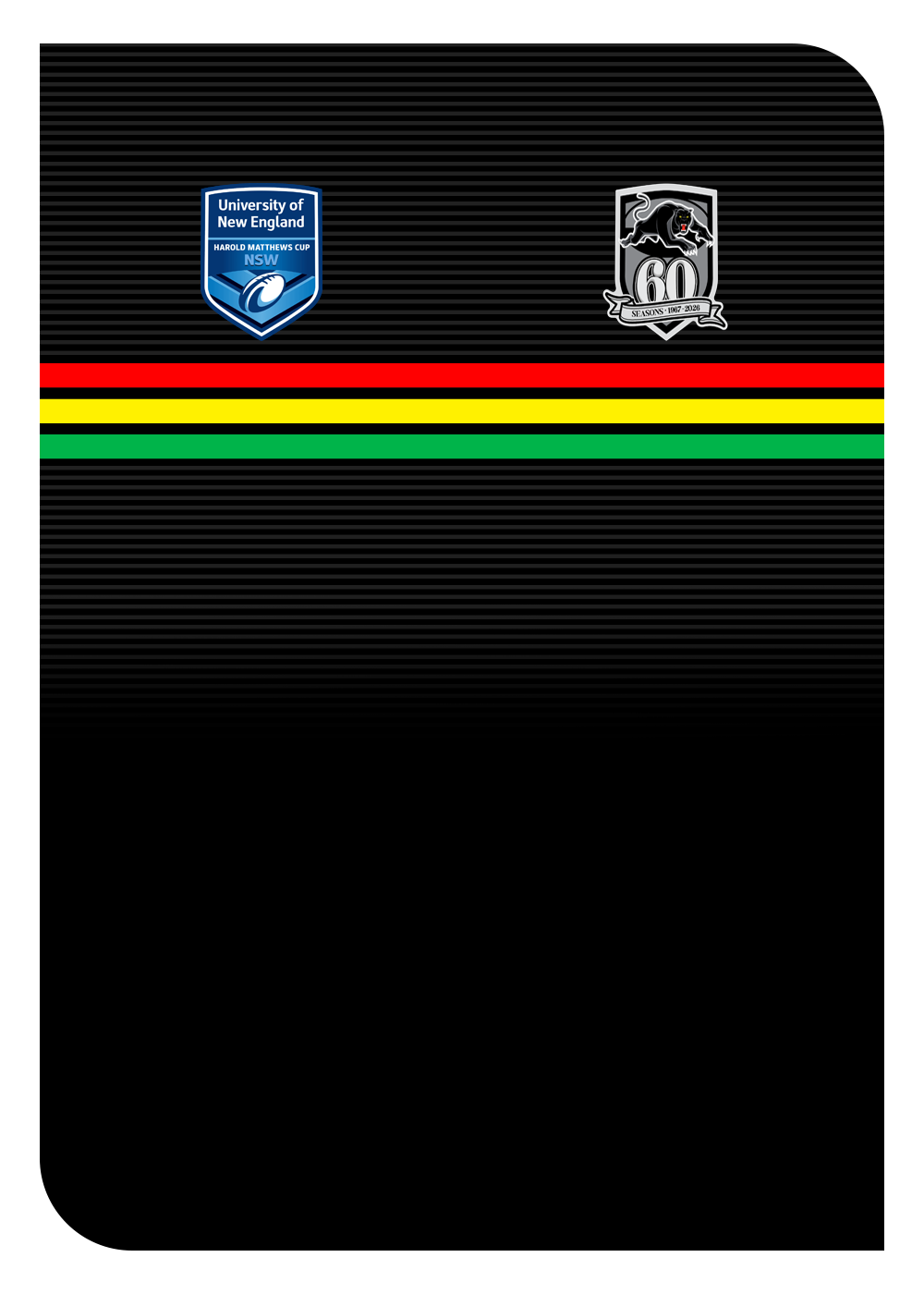
Penrith; Panthers Ground: Parker Street Reserve City/Suburb: Sydney (Penrith) Coach: TBA Affiliate: Penrith Panthers

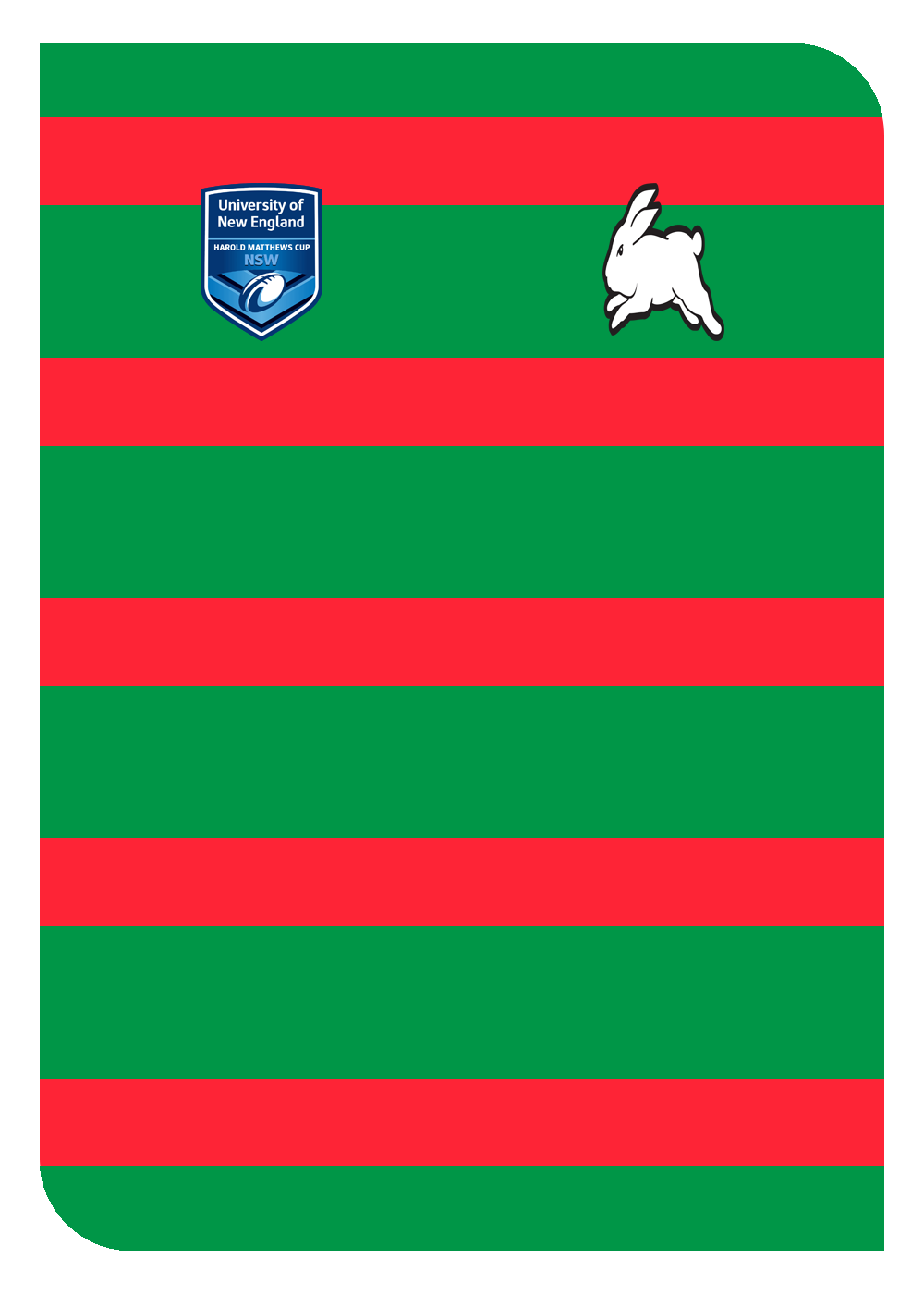
South Sydney; Rabbitohs Ground: Redfern Oval City/Suburb: Sydney (Redfern) Coach: TBA Affiliate: South Sydney Rabbitohs

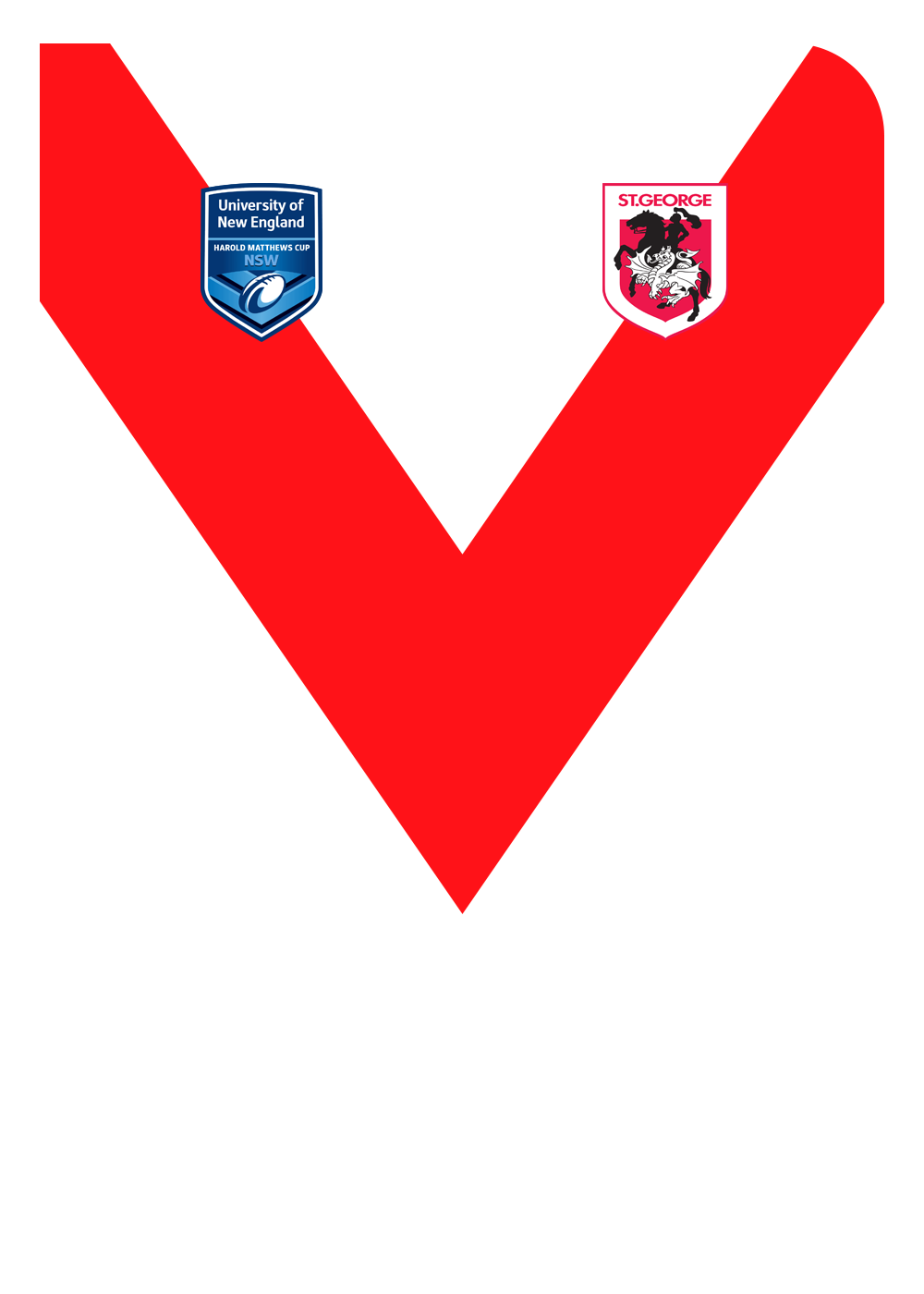
St George; Dragons Ground: Jubilee Stadium City/Suburb: Sydney (Kogarah) Coach: TBA Affiliate: St George Illawarra Dragons

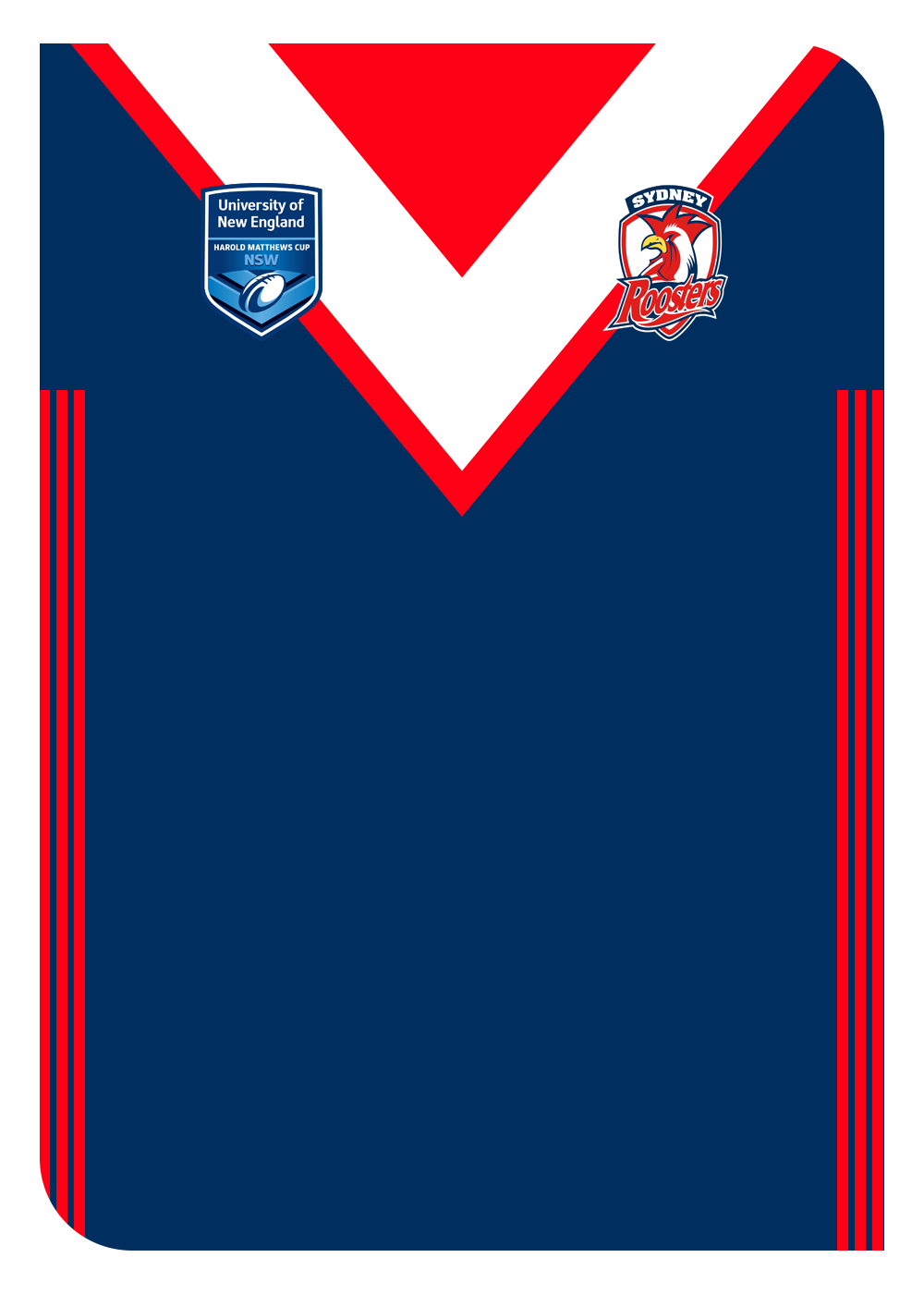
Sydney; Roosters Ground: Henson Park City/Suburb: Sydney (Marrickville) Coach: TBA Affiliate: Sydney Roosters

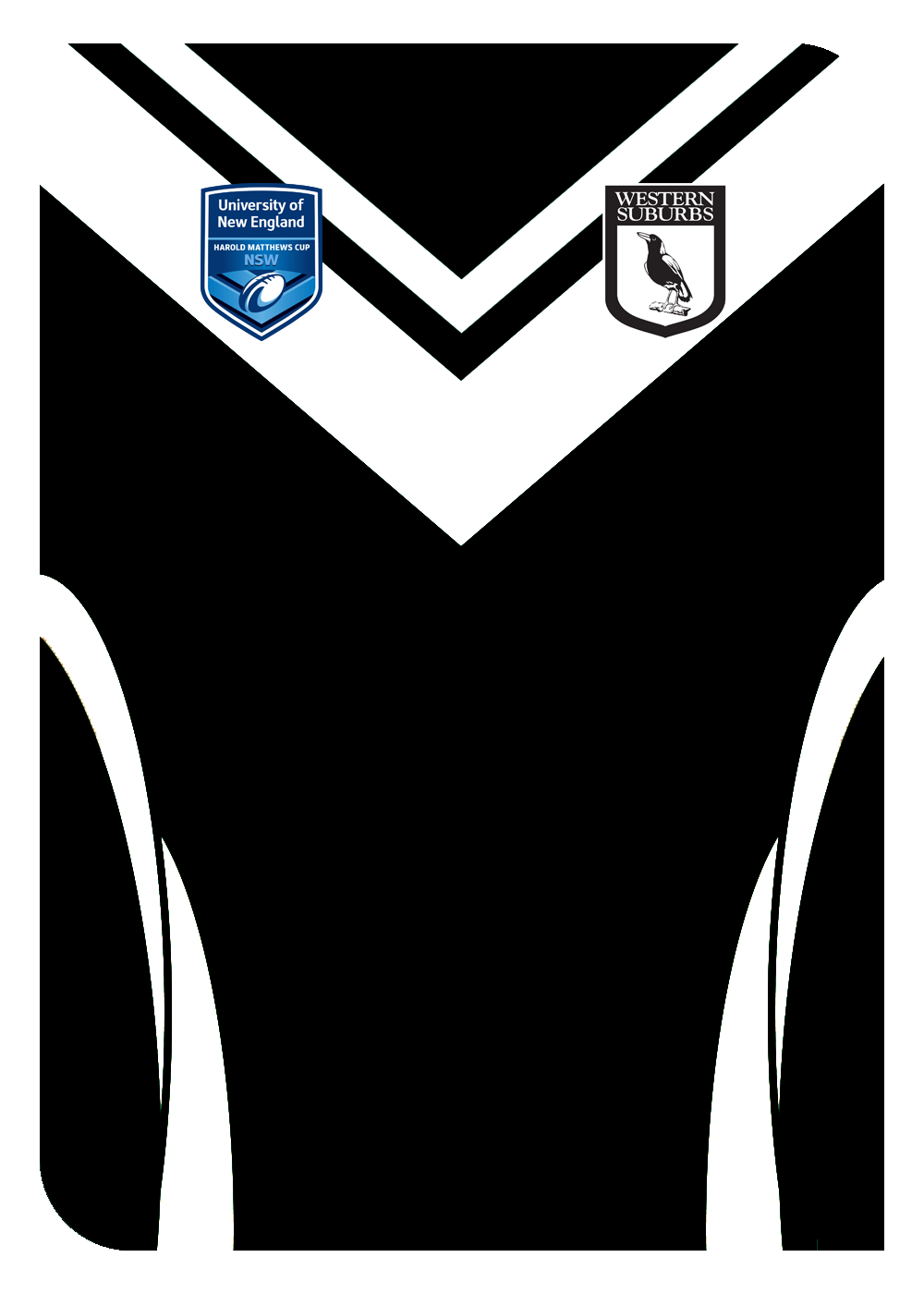
Western Suburbs; Magpies Ground: Kirkham Oval City/Suburb: Sydney (Elderslie) Coach: TBA Affiliate: Wests Tigers

=== Ladder ===
Pos	Team	Pld	W	D	L	B	PF	PA	PD	Pts	Qualification
1	Newcastle Knights (U17s)	7	7	0	0	1	180	86	+94	16	Minor Premiers & Qualifying Finals
2	Penrith Panthers (U17s)	7	6	0	1	1	244	78	+166	14	Qualifying Finals
3	Illawarra Steelers (U17s)	7	6	0	1	1	174	102	+72	14	Qualifying Finals
4	South Sydney Rabbitohs (U17s)	7	6	0	1	1	154	103	+51	14	Qualifying Finals
5	Parramatta Eels (U17s)	7	5	0	2	1	161	84	+77	12	Elimination Finals
6	Sydney Roosters (U17s)	7	4	0	3	1	148	124	+24	10	Elimination Finals
7	Manly Warringah Sea Eagles (U17s)	7	4	0	3	1	136	128	+8	10	Elimination Finals
8	Canterbury-Bankstown Bulldogs (U17s)	7	4	0	3	1	144	158	–14	10	Elimination Finals
9	Canberra Raiders (U17s)	7	3	0	4	1	132	142	–10	8	
10	Balmain Tigers (U17s)	7	3	0	4	1	118	146	–28	8	
11	North Sydney Bears (U17s)	7	3	0	4	1	108	190	–82	8	
12	Cronulla-Sutherland Sharks (U17s)	7	2	0	5	1	170	186	–16	6	
13	St George Dragons (U17s)	7	2	0	5	1	86	152	–66	6	
14	Western Suburbs Magpies (U17s)	8	2	0	6	0	160	166	–6	4	
15	New Zealand Warriors (U17s)	7	1	0	6	1	138	172	–34	4	
16	Melbourne Storm (U17s)	7	1	0	6	1	76	174	–98	4	
17	Central Coast Roosters (U17s)	7	1	0	6	1	88	236	-148	4	

Updated to match(es) played on 1 September. Source:
Rules for classification: 1) points; 2) point difference; 3) points scored

==== Ladder progression ====
- Numbers highlighted in green indicate that the team finished the round inside the top 8.
- Numbers highlighted in blue indicates the team finished first on the ladder in that round.
- Numbers highlighted in red indicates the team finished last place on the ladder in that round.
- Underlined numbers indicate that the team had a bye during that round.

Pos	Team	1	2	3	4	5	6	7	8	9
1	Newcastle Knights (U17s)	2	4	6	8	10	12	14	16	
2	Penrith Panthers (U17s)	2	4	6	8	10	10	12	14	
3	Illawarra Steelers (U17s)	2	2	4	6	8	10	12	14	
4	South Sydney Rabbitohs (U17s)	0	2	4	6	8	10	12	14	
5	Parramatta Eels (U17s)	2	4	6	6	8	8	10	12	
6	Sydney Roosters (U17s)	0	2	4	4	6	6	8	10	
7	Manly Warringah Sea Eagles (U17s)	2	4	4	6	6	8	8	10	
8	Canterbury-Bankstown Bulldogs (U17s)	2	4	6	6	8	8	10	10	
9	Canberra Raiders (U17s)	2	2	2	4	4	6	8	8	
10	Balmain Tigers (U17s)	0	2	2	2	2	4	6	8	
11	North Sydney Bears (U17s)	2	2	2	2	4	6	6	8	
12	Cronulla-Sutherland Sharks (U17s)	0	0	2	2	2	4	6	6	
13	St George Dragons (U17s)	0	2	2	4	6	6	6	6	
14	Western Suburbs Magpies (U17s)	0	0	0	2	2	2	2	4	
15	New Zealand Warriors (U17s)	0	0	2	4	4	4	4	4	
16	Melbourne Storm (U17s)	0	0	0	0	2	2	2	4	
17	Central Coast Roosters (U17s)	2	2	2	2	2	4	4	4	

Season Results:

Home	Score	Away	Match Information
Home	Score	Away	Date and Time	Venue	Referee	Video
Round 1
Sydney Roosters (U17s)	10 – 32	Penrith Panthers (U17s)	Saturday, 7 February, 10:00am	Mascot Oval	Rami Abu-Mansour
Western Suburbs Magpies (U17s)	16 – 18	Parramatta Eels (U17s)	Saturday, 7 February, 10:30am	Kirkham Oval	Matthew Galvin
Canberra Raiders (U17s)	24 – 10	St George Dragons (U17s)	Saturday, 7 February, 11:00am	Raiders Belconnen	Aidan Richardson
Melbourne Storm (U17s)	18 – 20	North Sydney Bears (U17s)	Saturday, 7 February, 1:00pm	Seabrook Reserve	William Roache
Central Coast Roosters (U17s)	34 – 16	Balmain Tigers (U17s)	Saturday, 7 February, 1:00pm	Woy Woy Oval	Matthew Gomes
South Sydney Rabbitohs (U17s)	16 – 18	Illawarra Steelers (U17s)	Saturday, 7 February, 1:30pm	Redfern Oval	Jabril Daizli
New Zealand Warriors (U17s)	18 – 24	Manly Warringah Sea Eagles (U17s)	Sunday, 8 February, 10:00am	Bruce Pulman Park	Kevin Ah Ken
Newcastle Knights (U17s)	34 – 32	Cronulla-Sutherland Sharks (U17s)	Sunday, 8 February, 1:30pm	Maitland Sports Ground	Brayden Silvester
Canterbury-Bankstown Bulldogs (U17s)		BYE
Round 2
Manly Warringah Sea Eagles (U17s)	24 – 18	North Sydney Bears (U17s)	Saturday, 14 February, 1:00pm	4 Pines Park	Callum Richardson
Penrith Panthers (U17s)	38 – 0	Central Coast Roosters (U17s)	Saturday, 14 February, 1:00pm	St Marys Leagues Stadium	Stuart Halsey
Canterbury-Bankstown Bulldogs (U17s)	28 – 6	Canberra Raiders (U17s)	Saturday, 14 February, 1:00pm	McCredie Park	Aidan Richardson
Illawarra Steelers (U17s)	12 – 22	Sydney Roosters (U17s)	Saturday, 14 February, 1:30pm	Collegians Sports Stadium	Matthew Galvin
Newcastle Knights (U17s)	24 – 12	Western Suburbs Magpies (U17s)	Saturday, 14 February, 2:00pm	Lakeside Sporting Complex	Callum Rigby
St George Dragons (U17s)	16 – 10	Melbourne Storm (U17s)	Saturday, 14 February, 3:00pm	Mascot Oval	Brayden Silvester
New Zealand Warriors (U17s)	16 – 28	South Sydney Rabbitohs (U17s)	Sunday, 15 February, 10:00am	Bruce Pulman Park	Porfi Vivas
Cronulla-Sutherland Sharks (U17s)	10 – 20	Parramatta Eels (U17s)	Sunday, 15 February, 10:30am	Henson Park	Matthew Gomes
Balmain Tigers (U17s)		BYE
Round 3
Canterbury-Bankstown Bulldogs (U17s)	28 – 22	Central Coast Roosters (U17s)	Saturday, 21 February, 10:30am	McCredie Park	Rami Abu-Mansour
Balmain Tigers (U17s)	8 – 22	Parramatta Eels (U17s)	Saturday, 21 February, 10:30am	Leichhardt Oval	Aidan Richardson
North Sydney Bears (U17s)	24 – 40	Cronulla-Sutherland Sharks (U17s)	Saturday, 21 February, 1:00pm	Hills Grammar Oval	Matthew Galvin
South Sydney Rabbitohs (U17s)	16 – 10	Western Suburbs Magpies (U17s)	Saturday, 21 February, 1:30pm	Redfern Oval	Callum Rigby
Canberra Raiders (U17s)	20 – 30	Penrith Panthers (U17s)	Saturday, 21 February, 2:00pm	Raiders Belconnen	Ben Raymond
Newcastle Knights (U17s)	28 – 6	Melbourne Storm (U17s)	Saturday, 21 February, 3:00pm	Lakeside Sporting Complex	Brayden Silvester
Illawarra Steelers (U17s)	18 – 12	Manly Warringah Sea Eagles (U17s)	Saturday, 21 February, 4:00pm	WIN Stadium	Stuart Halsey
Sydney Roosters (U17s)	32 – 4	St George Dragons (U17s)	Sunday, 22 February, 11:00am	Henson Park	Callum Richardson
New Zealand Warriors (U17s)		BYE
Round 4
South Sydney Rabbitohs (U17s)	26 – 22	Canterbury-Bankstown Bulldogs (U17s)	Saturday, 28 February, 11:30am	Redfern Oval	Stuart Halsey
Sydney Roosters (U17s)	6 – 20	Newcastle Knights (U17s)	Saturday, 28 February, 12:30pm	Leichhardt Oval	Carter Spowert-Lehman
Western Suburbs Magpies (U17s)	32 – 4	Balmain Tigers (U17s)	Saturday, 28 February, 1:00pm	Kirkham Oval	Ben Raymond
Cronulla-Sutherland Sharks (U17s)	18 – 24	St George Dragons (U17s)	Saturday, 28 February, 1:00pm	Ocean Protect Stadium	Matthew Gomes
North Sydney Bears (U17s)	0 – 54	Penrith Panthers (U17s)	Saturday, 28 February, 1:30pm	St Marys Leagues Stadium	Callum Richardson
Parramatta Eels (U17s)	18 – 22	Illawarra Steelers (U17s)	Saturday, 28 February, 3:30pm	James Hardie Centre of Excellence	Rami Abu-Mansour
New Zealand Warriors (U17s)	50 – 18	Central Coast Roosters (U17s)	Sunday, 1 March, 10:00am	Bruce Pulman Park	Epiha Muru-Kete
Canberra Raiders (U17s)	32 – 10	Melbourne Storm (U17s)	Sunday, 1 March, 1:00pm	Raiders Belconnen	Aidan Richardson
Manly Warringah Sea Eagles (U17s)		BYE
Round 5
Canterbury-Bankstown Bulldogs (U17s)	26 – 16	New Zealand Warriors (U17s)	Saturday, 7 March, 10:30am	Hammondville Oval	Stuart Halsey
Melbourne Storm (U17s)	18 – 16	Balmain Tigers (U17s)	Saturday, 7 March, 12:30pm	Gosch's Paddock	William Roache
Central Coast Roosters (U17s)	4 – 18	Newcastle Knights (U17s)	Saturday, 7 March, 12:20pm	Woy Woy Oval	Callum Richardson
Illawarra Steelers (U17s)	30 – 22	Western Suburbs Magpies (U17s)	Saturday, 7 March, 1:30pm	Collegians Sports Stadium	Callum Rigby
Cronulla-Sutherland Sharks (U17s)	26 – 32	Sydney Roosters (U17s)	Saturday, 7 March, 1:45pm	Ocean Protect Stadium	Jabril Daizli
Canberra Raiders (U17s)	14 – 16	North Sydney Bears (U17s)	Saturday, 7 March, 3:00pm	Raiders Belconnen	Carter Spowert-Lehman
Manly Warringah Sea Eagles (U17s)	10 – 30	South Sydney Rabbitohs (U17s)	Sunday, 8 March, 11:00am	4 Pines Park	Brayden Silvester
St George Dragons (U17s)	BYE	Parramatta Eels (U17s)
Penrith Panthers (U17s)	BYE
Round 6
Penrith Panthers (U17s)	10 – 24	Newcastle Knights (U17s)	Saturday, 14 March, 10:30am	St Marys Leagues Stadium	Rami Abu-Mansour
Western Suburbs Magpies (U17s)	18 – 32	Manly Warringah Sea Eagles (U17s)	Saturday, 14 March, 10:55am	Lidcombe Oval	Callum Rigby
Canterbury-Bankstown Bulldogs (U17s)	6 – 34	Illawarra Steelers (U17s)	Saturday, 14 March, 11:00am	Hammondville Oval	Jabril Daizli
Sydney Roosters (U17s)	16 – 20	Canberra Raiders (U17s)	Saturday, 14 March, 12:00pm	Mascot Oval	Callum Richardson
Melbourne Storm (U17s)	10 – 24	Cronulla-Sutherland Sharks (U17s)	Saturday, 14 March, 12:30pm	Seabrook Reserve	Kai Davenport
St George Dragons (U17s)	10 – 20	North Sydney Bears (U17s)	Saturday, 14 March, 1:00pm	Collegians Sports Stadium	Carter Spowert-Lehman
South Sydney Rabbitohs (U17s)	14 – 11	Parramatta Eels (U17s)	Saturday, 14 March, 2:00pm	Redfern Oval	Jonathan Nicholls
Balmain Tigers (U17s)	24 – 22	New Zealand Warriors (U17s)	Sunday, 15 March, 12:00pm	Leichhardt Oval	Jake Walsh
Central Coast Roosters (U17s)		BYE
Round 7
North Sydney Bears (U17s)	10 – 30	Sydney Roosters (U17s)	Saturday, 21 March, 10:00am	Hills Grammar Oval	Stuart Halsey
Parramatta Eels (U17s)	26 – 10	New Zealand Warriors (U17s)	Saturday, 21 March, 10:30am	James Hardie Centre of Excellence	Jaylen Chasle
Manly Warringah Sea Eagles (U17s)	10 – 20	Balmain Tigers (U17s)	Saturday, 21 March, 12:00pm	4 Pines Park	Jake Walsh
Penrith Panthers (U17s)	38 – 4	Melbourne Storm (U17s)	Saturday, 21 March, 1:00pm	HE Laybutt Sporting Complex	Aidan Richardson
St George Dragons (U17s)	16 – 24	South Sydney Rabbitohs (U17s)	Saturday, 21 March, 1:00pm	Collegians Sports Stadium	Thomas Inness
Western Suburbs Magpies (U17s)	24 – 26	Canterbury-Bankstown Bulldogs (U17s)	Saturday, 21 March, 2:00pm	Kirkham Oval	Ben Raymond
Central Coast Roosters (U17s)	6 – 40	Illawarra Steelers (U17s)	Saturday, 21 March, 2:00pm	Woy Woy Oval	Lachlan Bryant
Newcastle Knights (U17s)	BYE	Canberra Raiders (U17s)
Cronulla-Sutherland Sharks (U17s)	BYE
Round 8
Newcastle Knights (U17s)	32 – 16	Canberra Raiders (U17s)	Saturday, 28 March, 1:30pm	Cessnock Sportsground	Brayden Silvester
Penrith Panthers (U17s)	42 – 20	Cronulla-Sutherland Sharks (U17s)	Saturday, 28 March, 1:30pm	St Marys Leagues Stadium	Aidan Richardson
Parramatta Eels (U17s)	46 – 4	Central Coast Roosters (U17s)	Saturday, 28 March, 2:00pm	Eric Tweedale Stadium	Jake Walsh
New Zealand Warriors (U17s)	16 – 26	Western Suburbs Magpies (U17s)	Sunday, 29 March, 10:00am	Bruce Pulman Park	Luke Whittiker
Balmain Tigers (U17s)	30 – 8	Canterbury-Bankstown Bulldogs (U17s)	Sunday, 29 March, 10:30am	Leichhardt Oval	Matthew Galvin
Manly Warringah Sea Eagles (U17s)	24 – 6	St George Dragons (U17s)	Sunday, 28 March, 1:00pm	Sydney Academy of Sport	Matthew Gomes
North Sydney Bears (U17s)	BYE	South Sydney Rabbitohs (U17s)
Sydney Roosters (U17s)	BYE	Illawarra Steelers (U17s)
Melbourne Storm (U17s)	BYE
Round 9 (Easter Round)
Cronulla-Sutherland Sharks (U17s)	V	Canberra Raiders (U17s)	Friday, 3 April, 3:30pm	Ocean Protect Stadium	Jaylen Chasle
Illawarra Steelers (U17s)	V	New Zealand Warriors (U17s)	Saturday, 4 April, 10:30am	Collegians Sports Stadium	Carter Spowert-Lehman
Balmain Tigers (U17s)	V	South Sydney Rabbitohs (U17s)	Saturday, 4 April, 10:30am	Leichhardt Oval	Aidan Richardson
Melbourne Storm (U17s)	V	Sydney Roosters (U17s)	Saturday, 4 April, 12:30pm	Seabrook Reserve	Jonathan Nicholls
Parramatta Eels (U17s)	V	Canterbury-Bankstown Bulldogs (U17s)	Saturday, 4 April, 1:00pm	James Hardie Centre of Excellence	Lachlan Bryant
North Sydney Bears (U17s)	V	Newcastle Knights (U17s)	Saturday, 4 April, 1:30pm	Hills Grammar Oval	Brayden Silvester
Central Coast Roosters (U17s)	V	Manly Warringah Sea Eagles (U17s)	Sunday, 5 April, 10:00am	Central Coast Regional Sporting Complex	Ben Raymond
St George Dragons (U17s)	V	Penrith Panthers (U17s)	Sunday, 5 April, 1:00pm	Jubilee Stadium	Jake Walsh
Western Suburbs Magpies (U17s)		BYE
Finals Series
Qualifying & Elimination Finals
1st Place	V	4th Place	11/12 April	TBA	TBA
2nd Place	V	3rd Place	11/12 April	TBA	TBA
5th Place	V	8th Place	11/12 April	TBA	TBA
6th Place	V	7th Place	11/12 April	TBA	TBA
Semi-Finals
QF1 Loser	V	EF1 Winner	18/19 April	TBA	TBA
QF2 Loser	V	EF2 Winner	18/19 April	TBA	TBA
Preliminary Finals
QF2 Winner	V	SF1 Winner	25/26 April	TBA	TBA
QF1 Winner	V	SF2 Winner	25/26 April	TBA	TBA
Grand Final
PF1 Winner	V	PF2 Winner	2/3 May	TBA	TBA

=== Grand Final ===
Qualifying & Elimination Finals
1
4
5
8
6
7
2
3

Semi-Finals
1/4
5/8
2/3
6/7

Preliminary Finals
1/4
2/3/6/7
2/3
1/4/5/8

Grand Final

2026 Harold Matthews Cup Grand Final

2/3 May 2026
TBA

PF1 Winner	v	PF2 Winner

TBA

== Lisa Fiaola Cup (Metro) ==
2026 Westpac Metro Lisa Fiaola Cup
- Duration: 7 February – 2/3 May 2026
- Teams: 14
- Broadcast partners: Streaming; BarTV Sports (All Matches)

The Lisa Fiaola Cup (metropolitan conference, named the Westpac Lisa Fiaola Cup for sponsorship reasons) is a junior representative competition for female players based in metropolitan New South Wales. It forms a key part of the female development pathway, complementing the Westpac Tarsha Gale Cup and feeding into senior women's competitions run by the NSWRL within the broader Lisa Fiaola Cup structure.

=== Teams ===
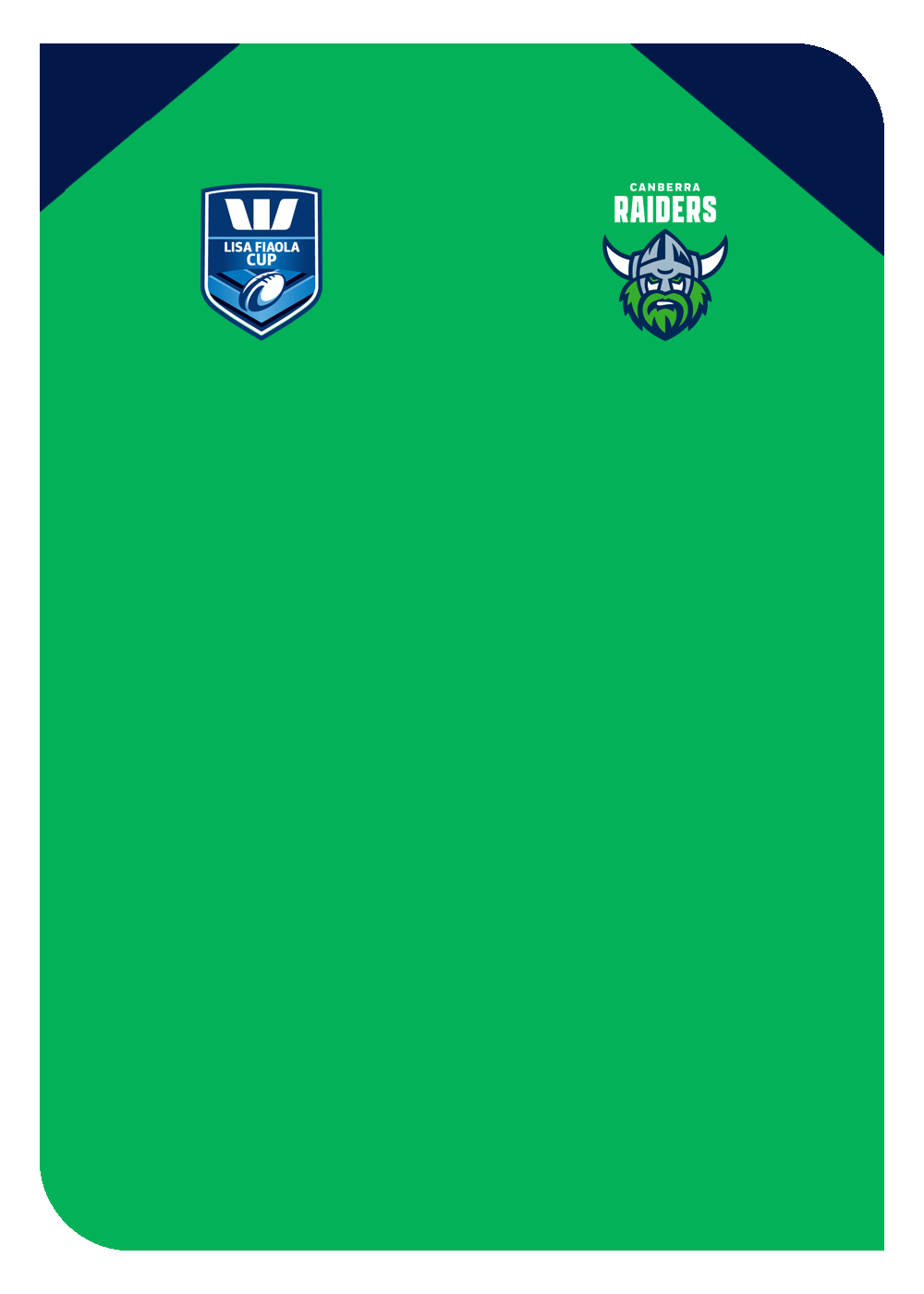
Canberra; Raiders Ground: Raiders Belconnen City/Suburb: Canberra (Holt) Coach: TBA Affiliate: Canberra Raiders

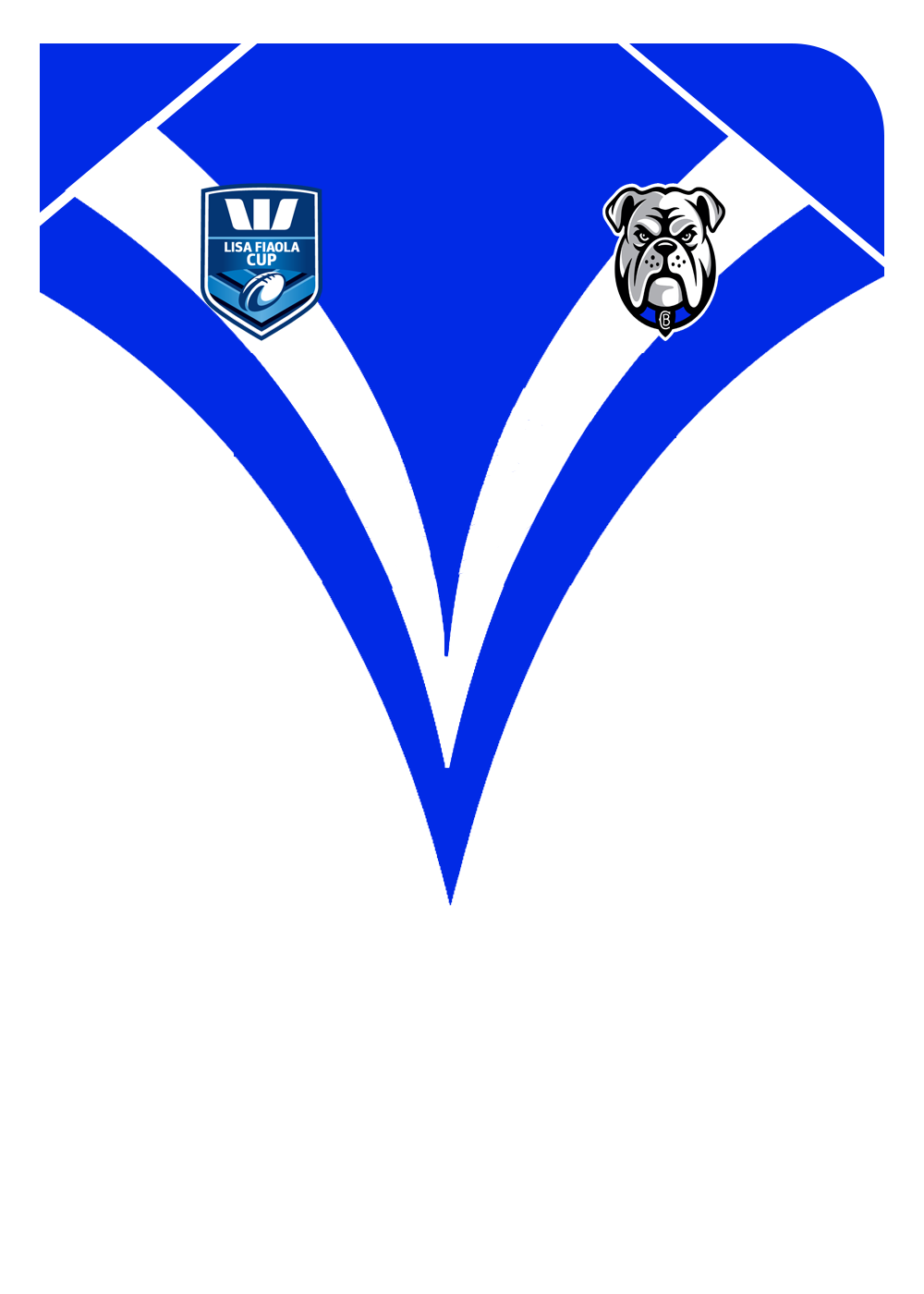
Canterbury-Bankstown; Bulldogs Ground: Hammondville Oval City/Suburb: Sydney (Hammondville) Coach: TBA Affiliate: Canterbury-Bankstown Bulldogs

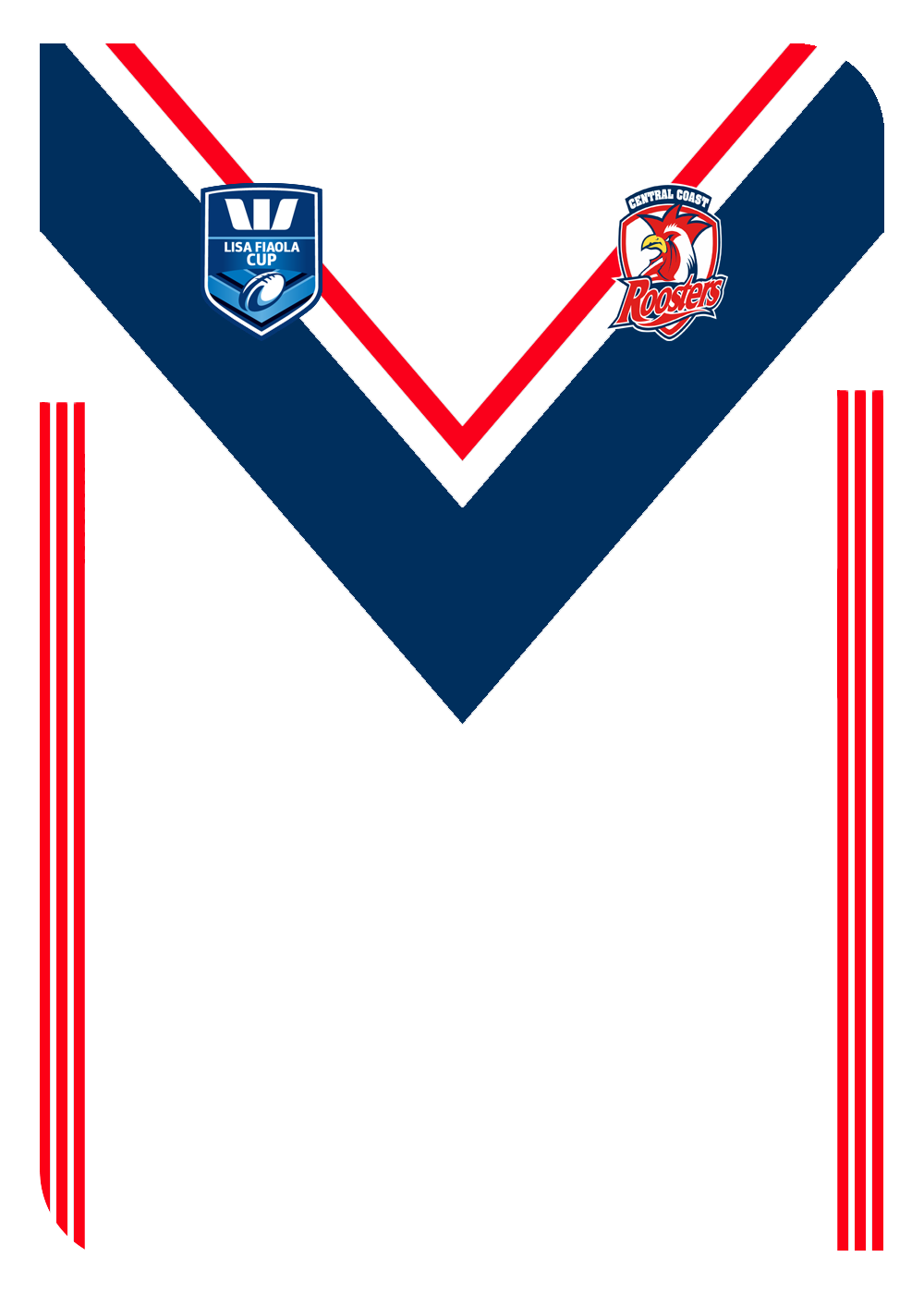
Central Coast; Roosters Ground: Woy Woy Oval City/Suburb: Woy Woy Coach: TBA Affiliate: Sydney Roosters

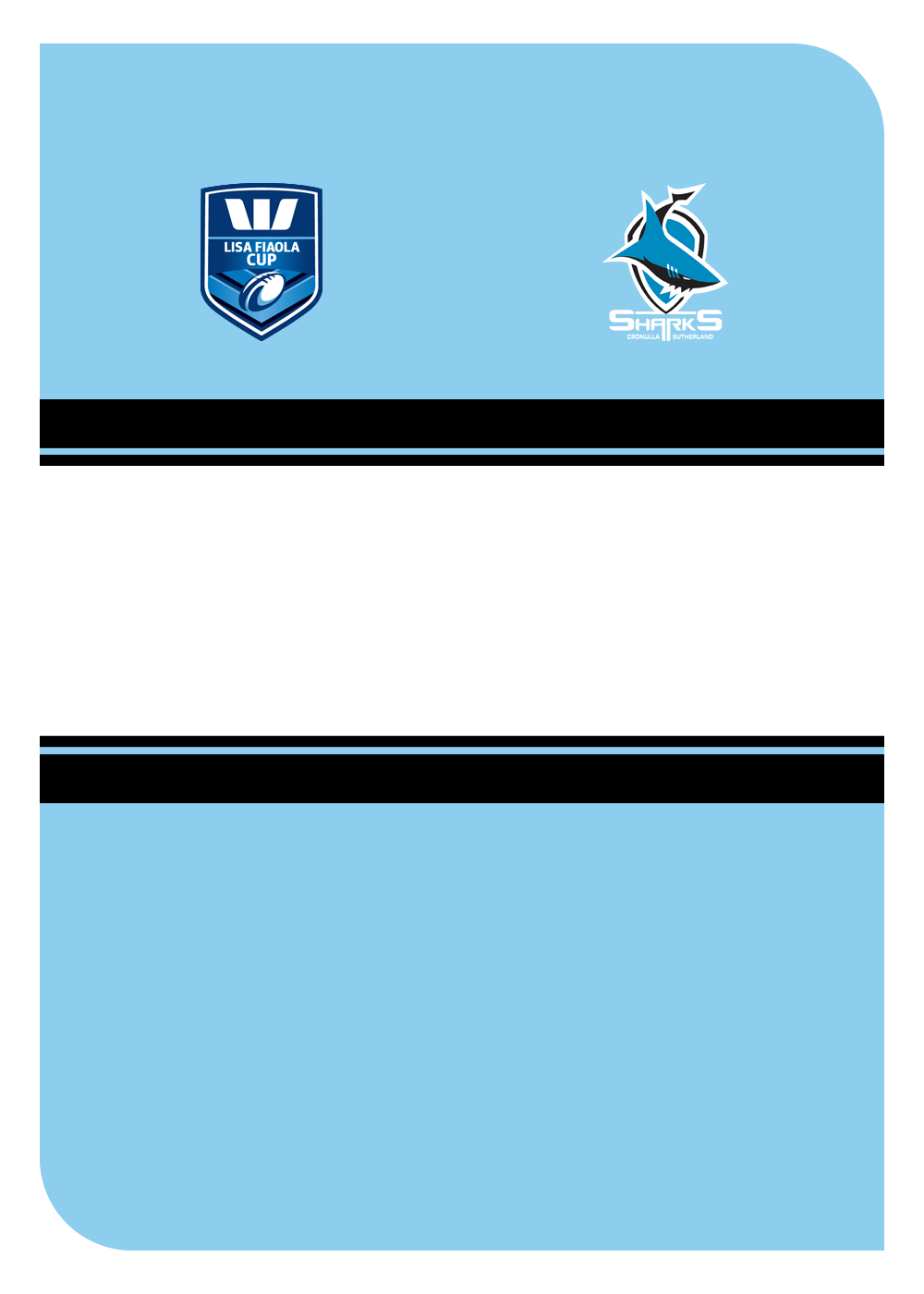
Cronulla-Sutherland; Sharks Ground: Ocean Protect Stadium City/Suburb: Sydney (Woolooware) Coach: TBA Affiliate: Cronulla-Sutherland Sharks

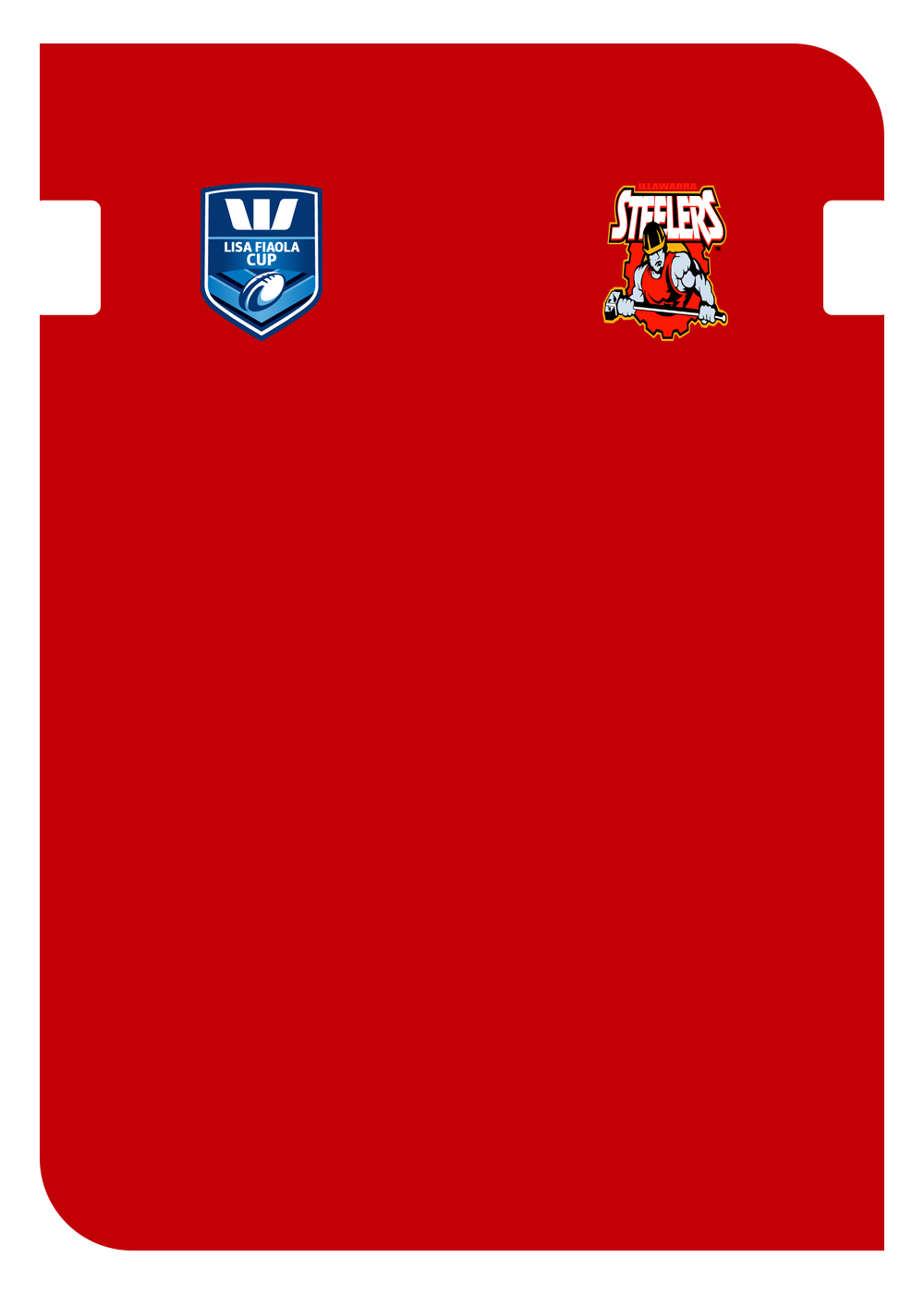
Illawarra; Steelers Ground: Collegians Sports Stadium City/Suburb: Wollongong (Figtree) Coach: TBA Affiliate: St George Illawarra Dragons

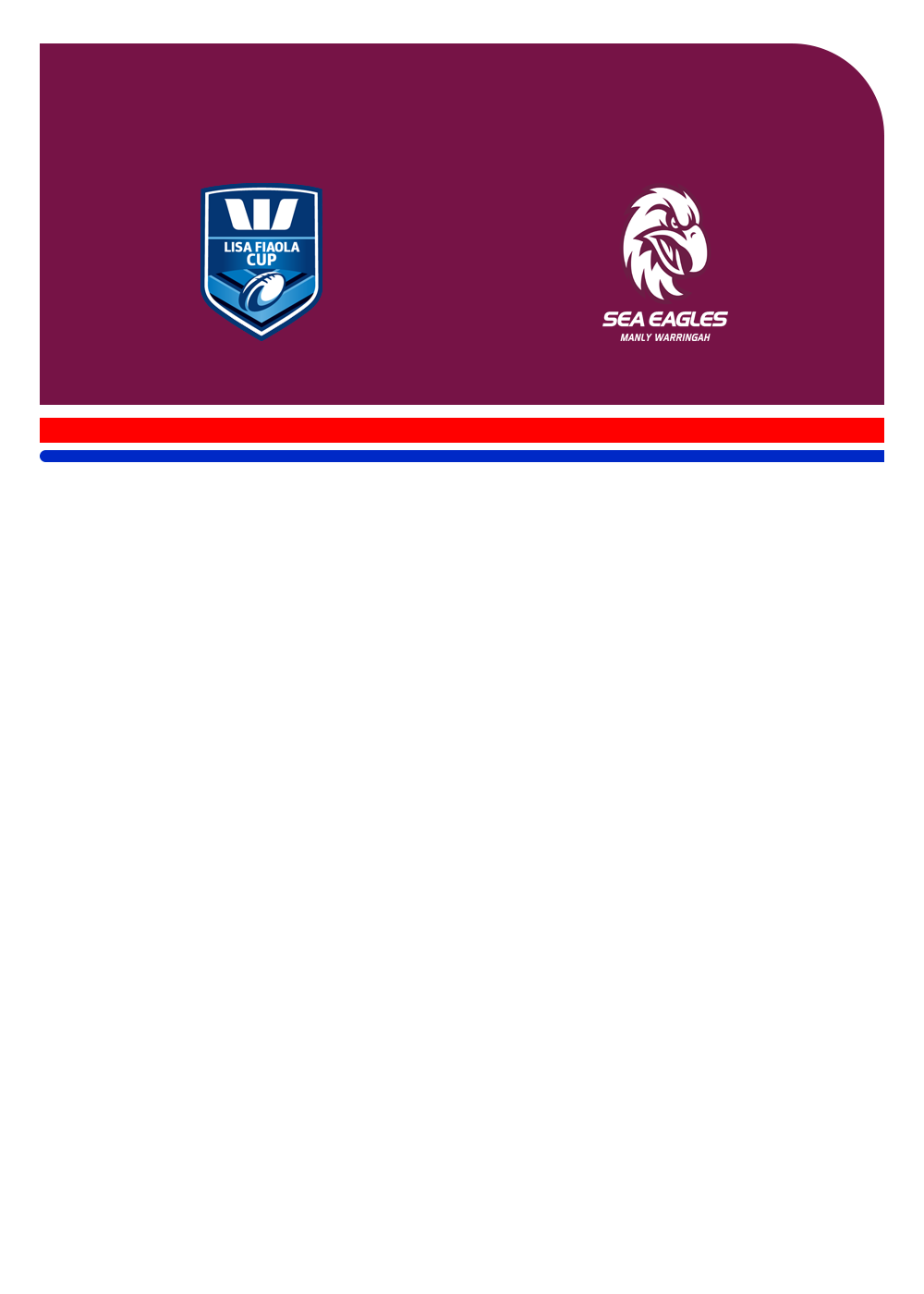
Manly Warringah; Sea Eagles Ground: 4 Pines Park City/Suburb: Sydney (Brookvale) Coach: TBA Affiliate: Manly Warringah Sea Eagles

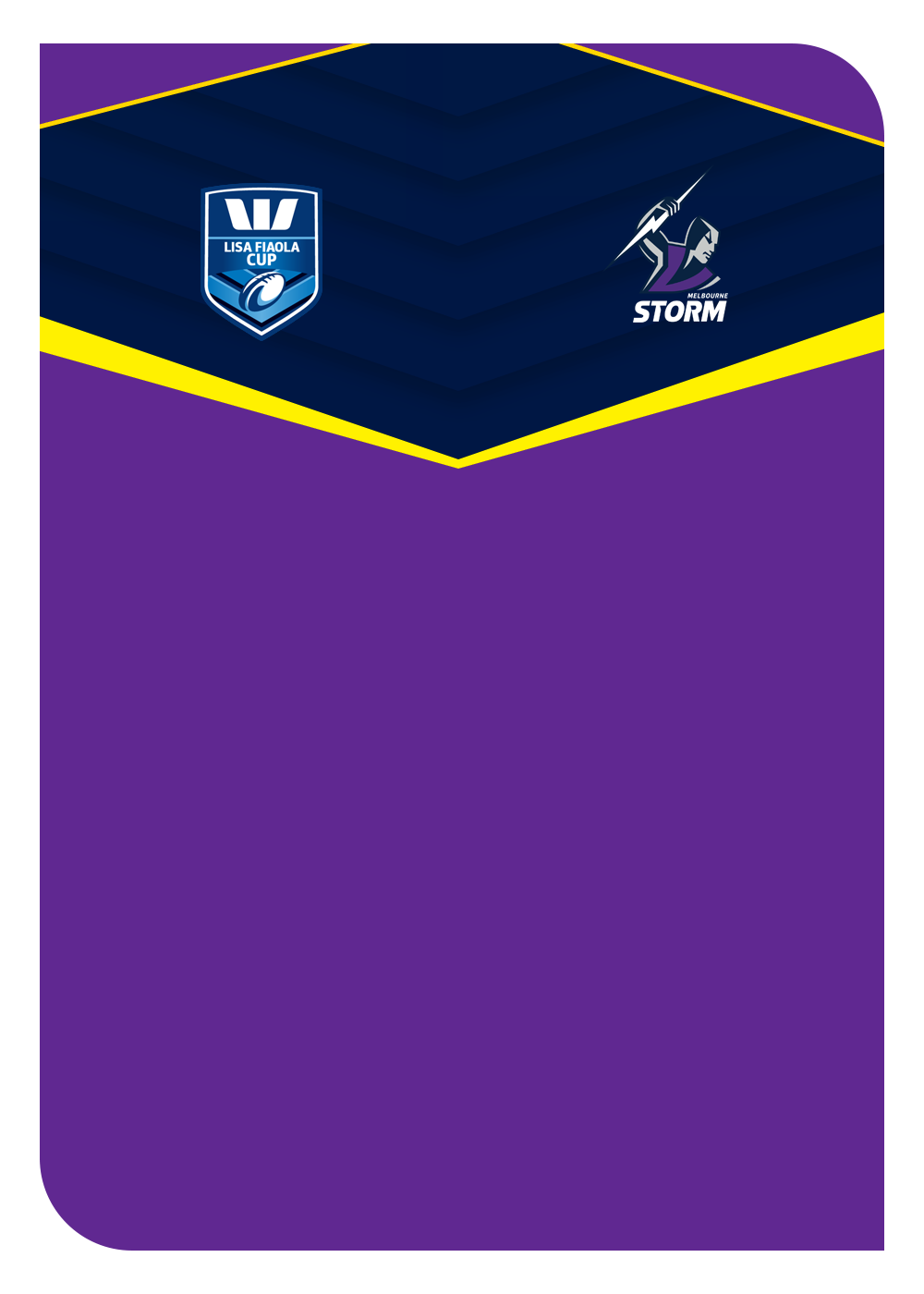
Melbourne; Storm Ground: Seabrook Reserve City/Suburb: Melbourne (Broadmeadows) Coach: TBA Affiliate: Melbourne Storm

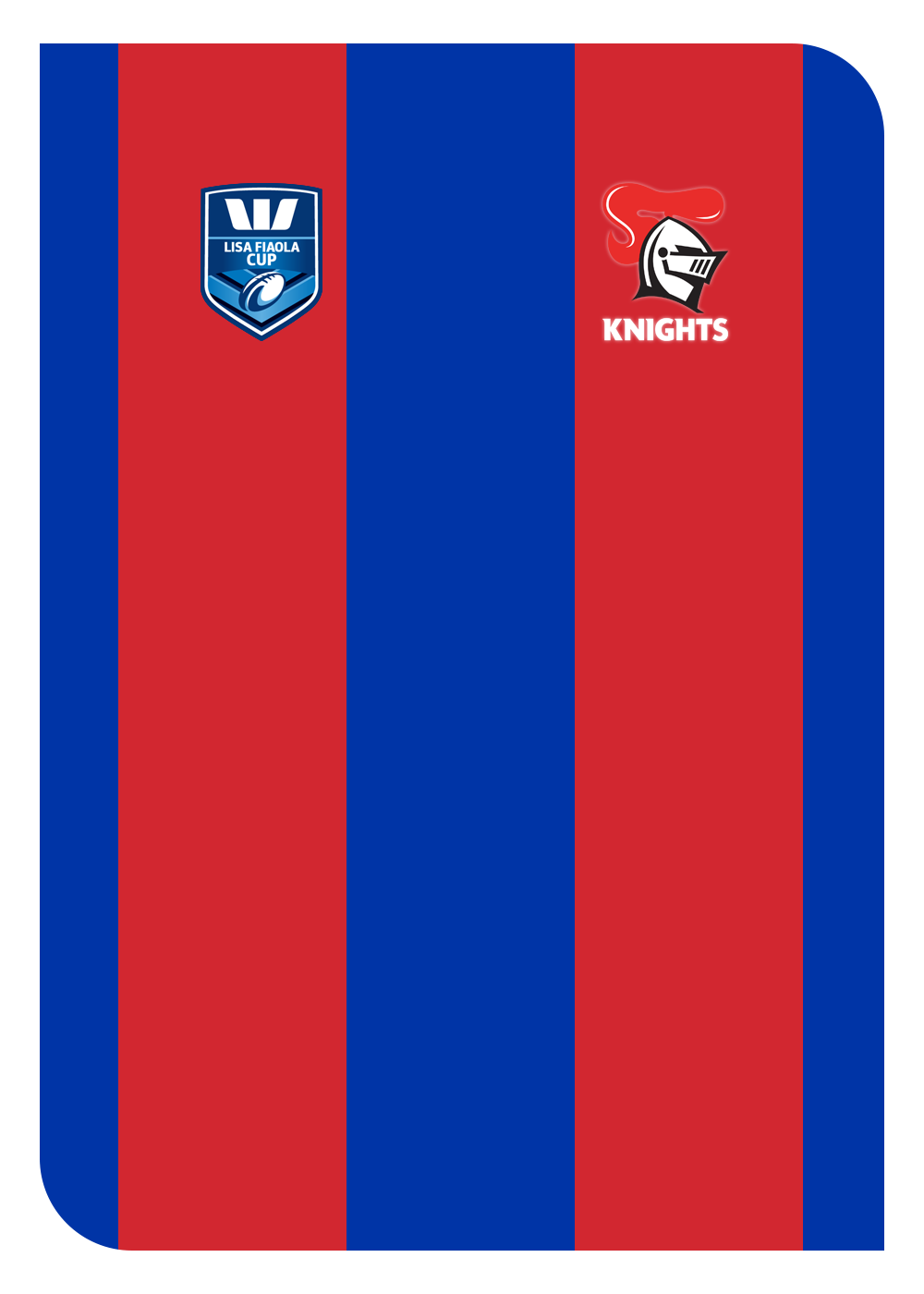
Newcastle; Knights Ground: Lakeside Sporting Complex City/Suburb: Raymond Terrace Coach: TBA Affiliate: Newcastle Knights

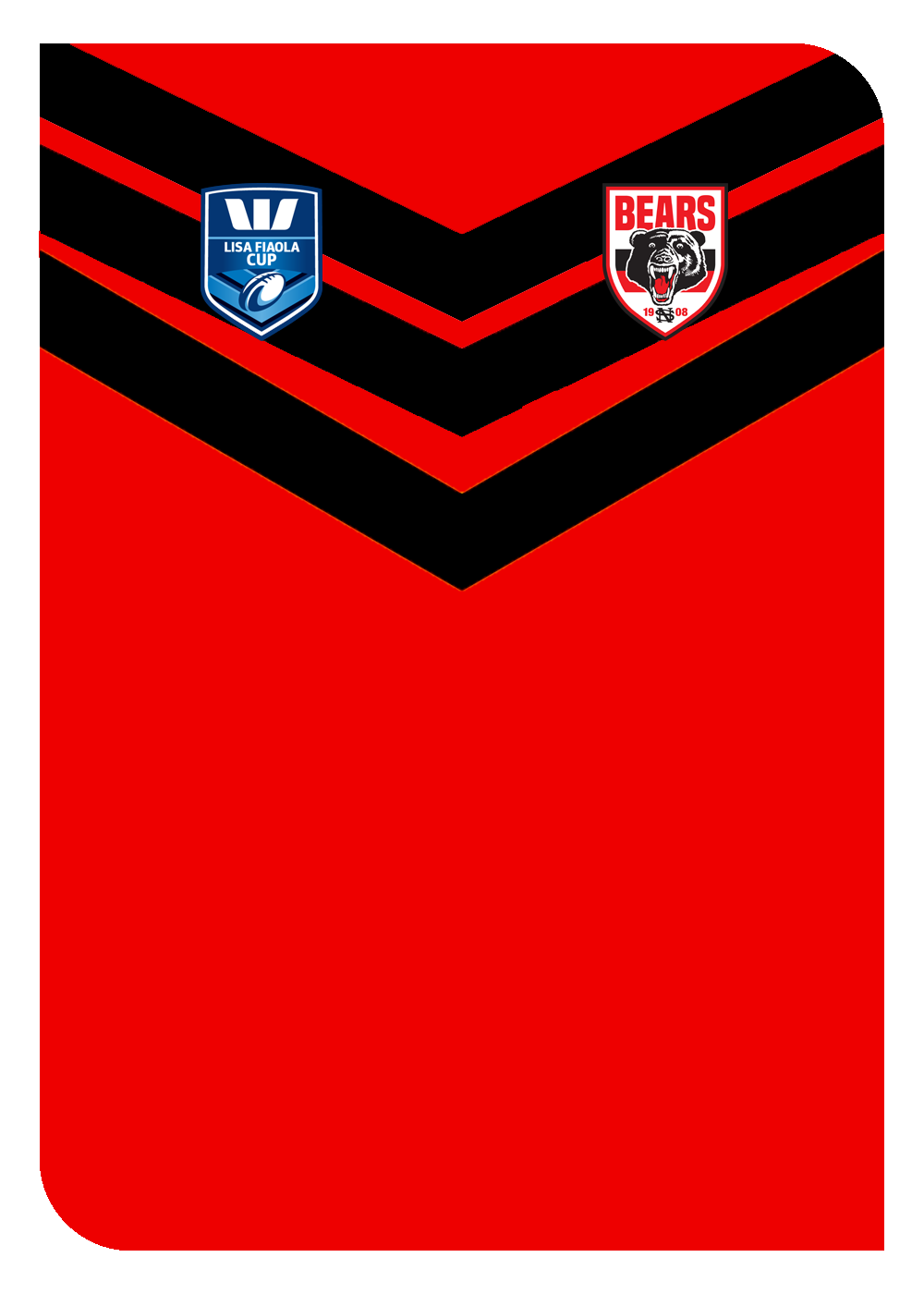
North Sydney; Bears Ground: Hills Grammar Oval City/Suburb: Sydney (Kenthurst) Coach: TBA Affiliate: Perth Bears

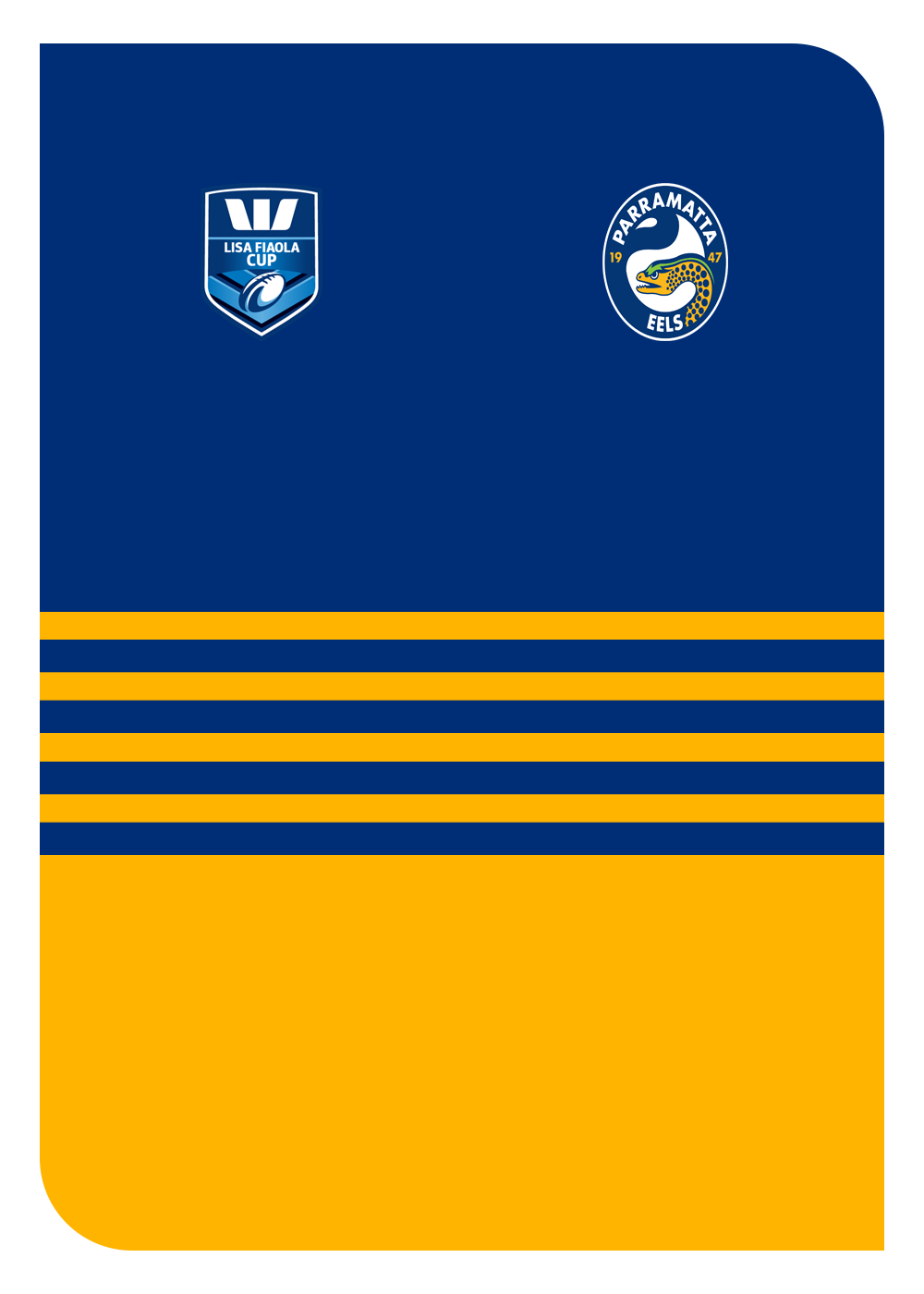
Parramatta; Eels Ground: James Hardie Centre of Excellence City/Suburb: Sydney (Kellyville) Coach: TBA Affiliate: Parramatta Eels

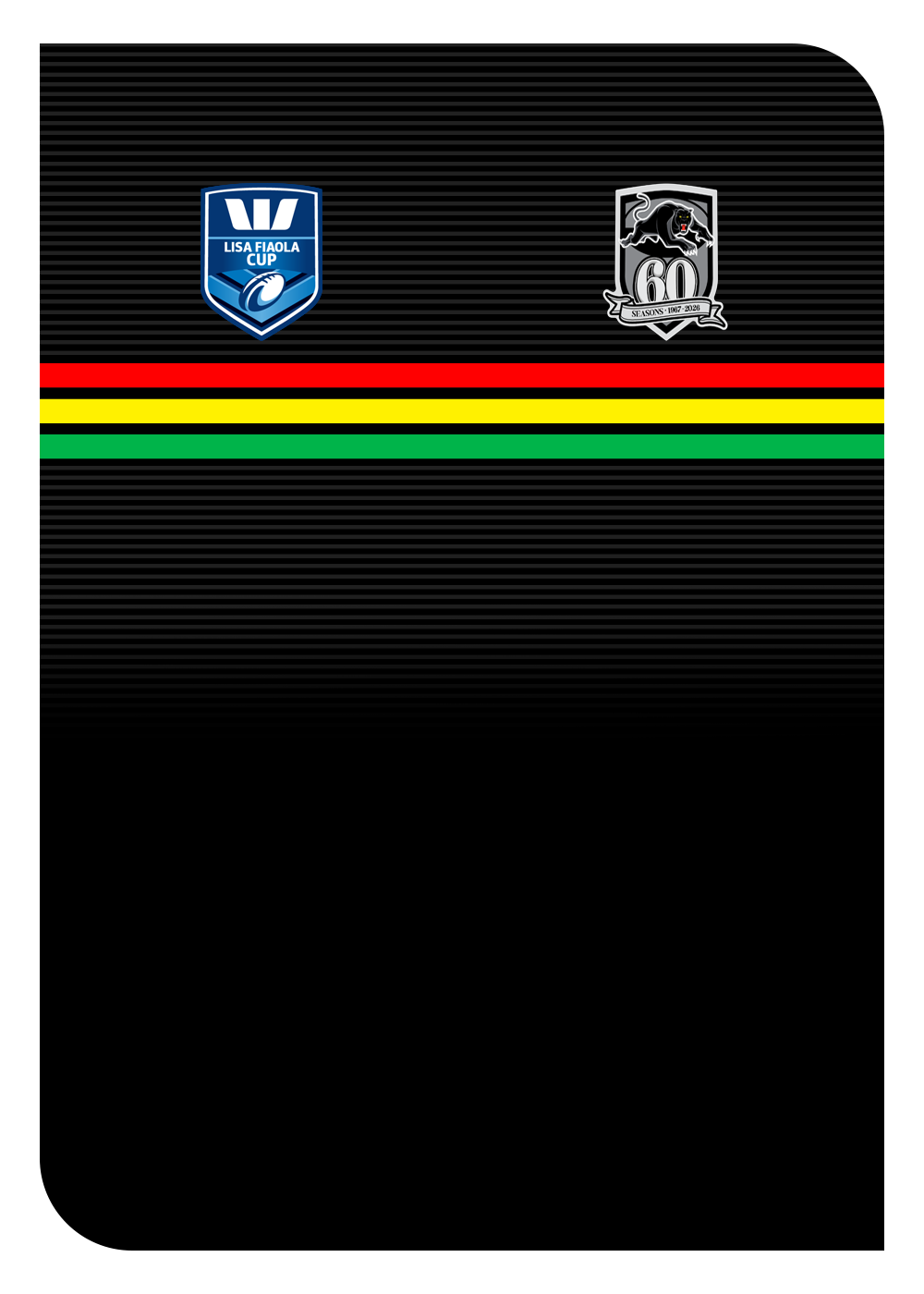
Penrith; Panthers Ground: Parker Street Reserve City/Suburb: Sydney (Penrith) Coach: TBA Affiliate: Penrith Panthers

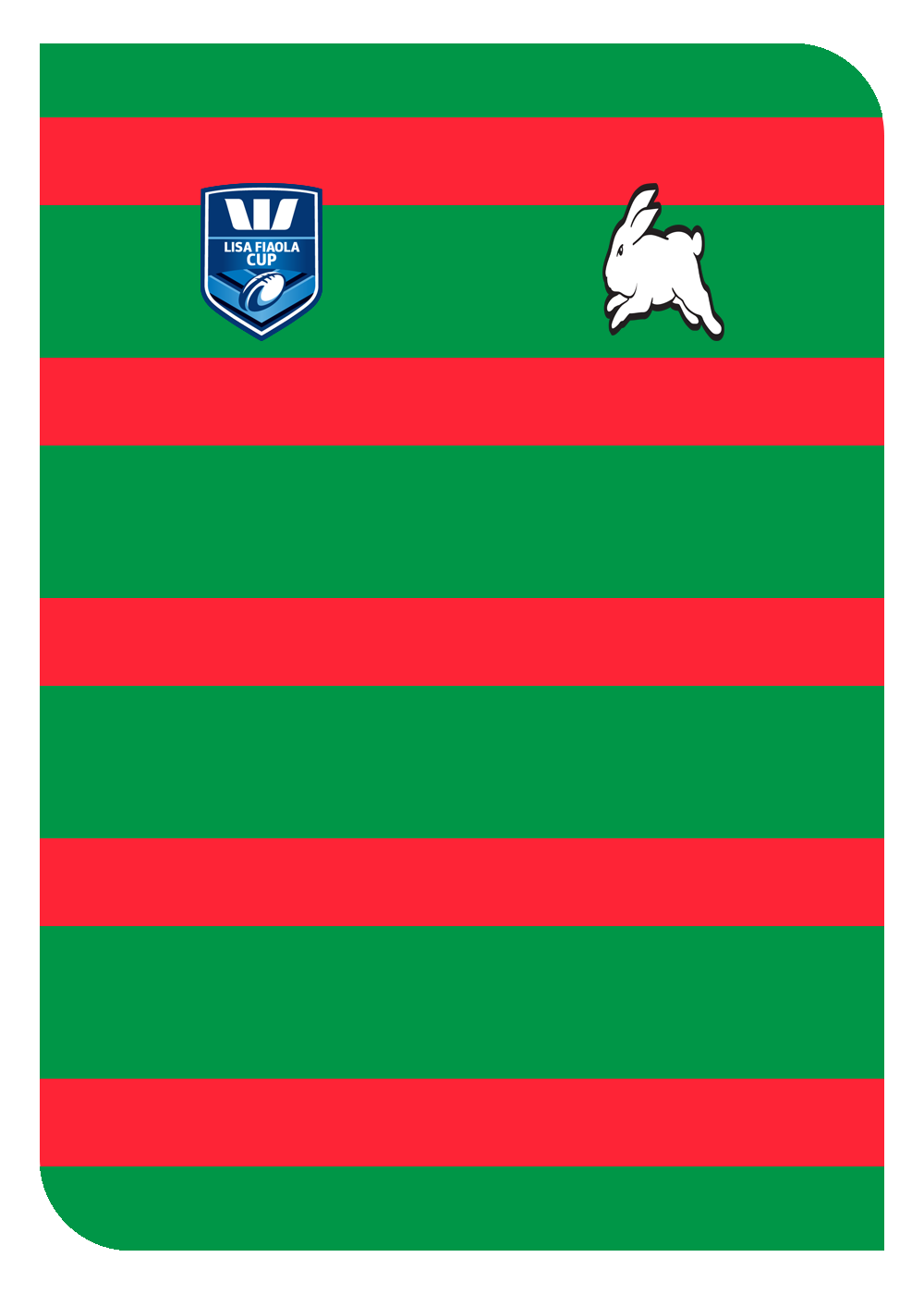
South Sydney; Rabbitohs Ground: Redfern Oval City/Suburb: Sydney (Redfern) Coach: TBA Affiliate: South Sydney Rabbitohs

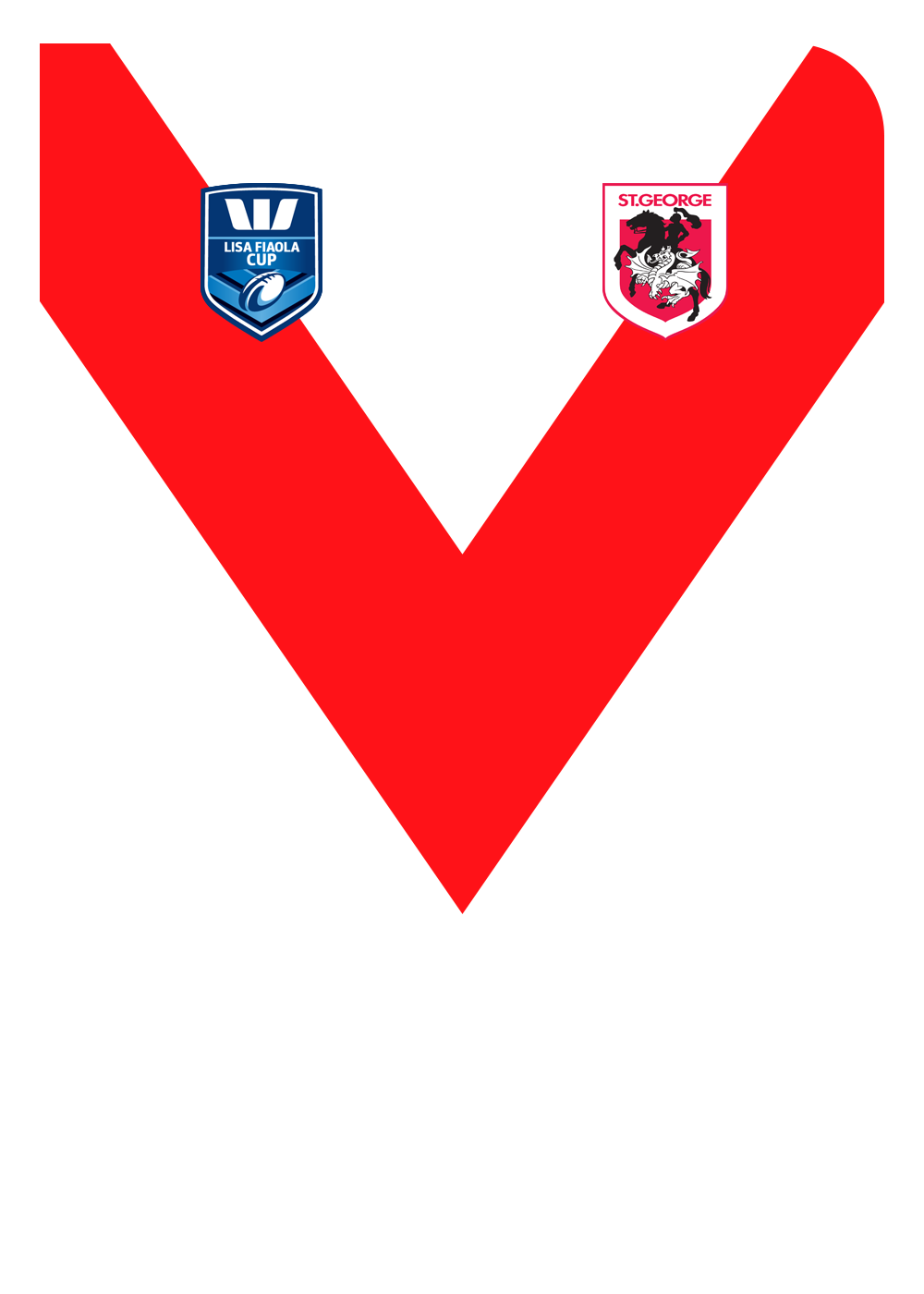
St George; Dragons Ground: Jubilee Stadium City/Suburb: Sydney (Kogarah) Coach: TBA Affiliate: St George Illawarra Dragons

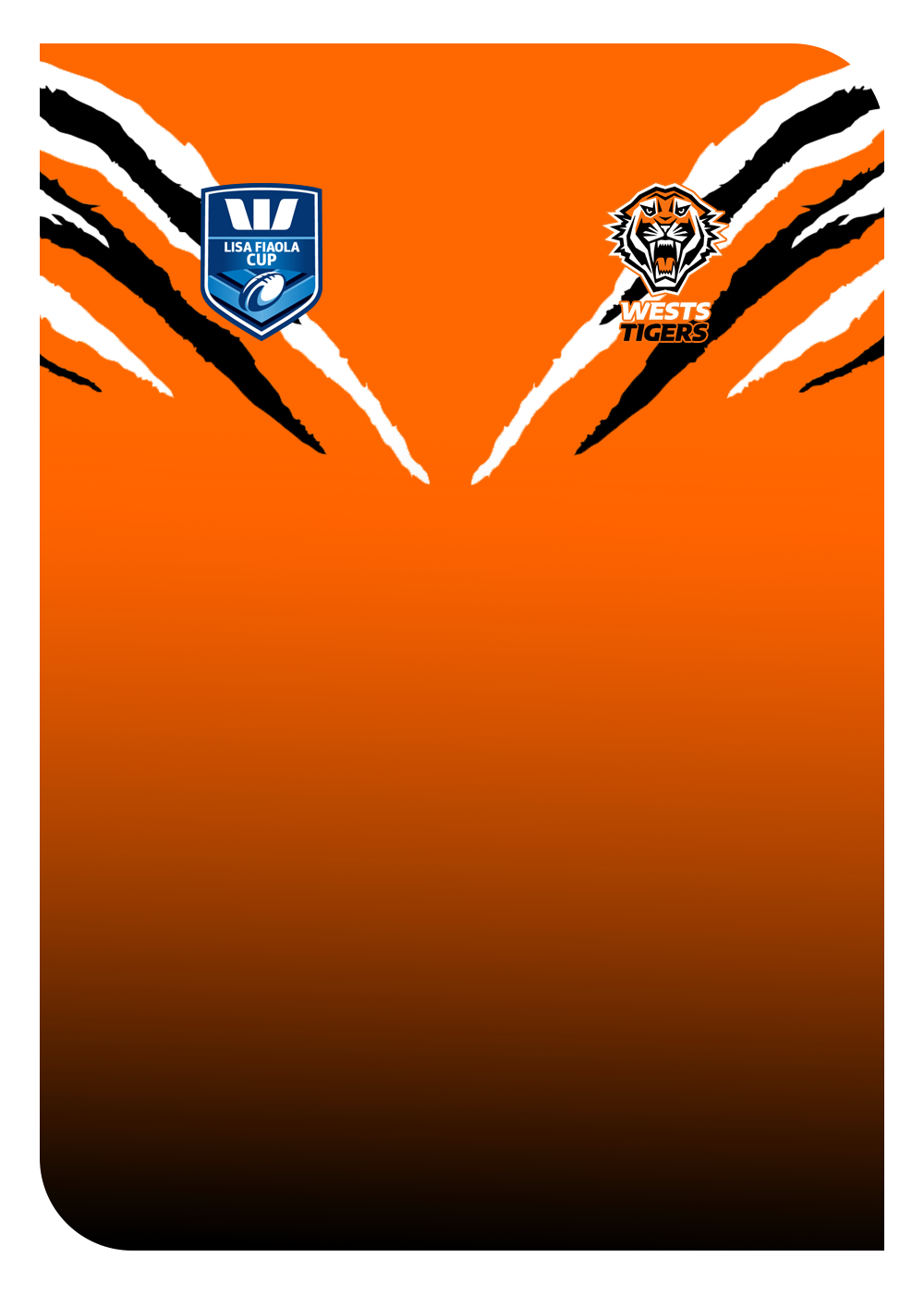
Wests; Tigers Ground: Leichhardt Oval City/Suburb: Sydney (Leichhardt) Coach: TBA Affiliate: Wests Tigers

=== Ladder ===
Pos	Team	Pld	W	D	L	B	PF	PA	PD	Pts	Qualification
1	Canterbury-Bankstown Bulldogs (U17s G)	7	7	0	0	1	282	32	+250	16	Minor Premiers & Qualifying Finals
2	Parramatta Eels (U17s G)	7	7	0	0	1	270	62	+208	16	Qualifying Finals
3	Newcastle Knights (U17s G)	7	7	0	0	1	230	72	+158	16	Qualifying Finals
4	Central Coast Roosters (U17s G)	7	5	0	2	1	216	110	+106	12	Qualifying Finals
5	Penrith Panthers (U17s G)	7	4	0	3	1	176	120	+56	10	Elimination Finals
6	Wests Tigers (U17s G)	7	4	0	3	1	120	98	+22	10	Elimination Finals
7	Melbourne Storm (U17s G)	7	3	1	3	1	180	126	+54	9	Elimination Finals
8	Cronulla-Sutherland Sharks (U17s G)	7	3	0	4	1	192	156	+36	8	Elimination Finals
9	Canberra Raiders (U17s G)	7	2	1	4	1	138	180	–42	7	
10	South Sydney Rabbitohs (U17s G)	7	2	0	5	1	116	154	–38	6	
11	North Sydney Bears (U17s G)	7	2	0	5	1	68	296	-228	6	
12	Illawarra Steelers (U17s G)	7	1	0	6	1	56	214	-158	4	
13	St George Dragons (U17s G)	7	1	0	6	1	62	236	-174	4	
14	Manly Warringah Sea Eagles (U17s G)	7	0	0	7	1	18	268	-250	2	

Updated to match(es) played on 1 September. Source:
Rules for classification: 1) points; 2) point difference; 3) points scored

==== Ladder progression ====
- Numbers highlighted in green indicate that the team finished the round inside the top 8.
- Numbers highlighted in blue indicates the team finished first on the ladder in that round.
- Numbers highlighted in red indicates the team finished last place on the ladder in that round.
- Underlined numbers indicate that the team had a bye during that round.

Pos	Team	1	2	3	4	5	6	7	8	9
1	Canterbury-Bankstown Bulldogs (U17s G)	2	4	6	8	10	12	14	16	
2	Parramatta Eels (U17s G)	2	4	6	8	10	12	14	16	
3	Newcastle Knights (U17s G)	2	4	6	8	10	12	14	16	
4	Central Coast Roosters (U17s G)	2	4	6	6	8	10	12	12	
5	Penrith Panthers (U17s G)	0	2	4	6	6	6	8	10	
6	Wests Tigers (U17s G)	0	0	2	4	6	8	10	10	
7	Melbourne Storm (U17s G)	2	4	4	5	5	7	7	9	
8	Cronulla-Sutherland Sharks (U17s G)	0	0	2	4	6	6	8	8	
9	Canberra Raiders (U17s G)	2	2	2	3	5	5	7	7	
10	South Sydney Rabbitohs (U17s G)	2	2	2	2	2	2	4	6	
11	North Sydney Bears (U17s G)	0	2	2	2	2	4	4	6	
12	Illawarra Steelers (U17s G)	0	0	2	2	2	2	2	4	
13	St George Dragons (U17s G)	0	0	0	0	2	2	2	4	
14	Manly Warringah Sea Eagles (U17s G)	0	0	0	2	2	2	2	2	

Season Results:

Home	Score	Away	Match Information
Home	Score	Away	Date and Time	Venue	Referee	Video
Round 1
Canterbury-Bankstown Bulldogs (U17s G)	68 – 0	Manly Warringah Sea Eagles (U17s G)	Saturday, 7 February, 10:00am	Hammondville Oval	Toby Parrott
South Sydney Rabbitohs (U17s G)	24 – 6	Illawarra Steelers (U17s G)	Saturday, 7 February, 10:00am	Redfern Oval	Josh Leigh
Melbourne Storm (U17s G)	50 – 4	North Sydney Bears (U17s G)	Saturday, 7 February, 1:00pm	Seabrook Reserve	Kai Davenport
Wests Tigers (U17s G)	4 – 24	Parramatta Eels (U17s G)	Saturday, 7 February, 1:30pm	Kirkham Oval	James Fitzgerald
Canberra Raiders (U17s G)	48 – 12	St George Dragons (U17s G)	Saturday, 7 February, 2:00pm	Raiders Belconnen	Reece Sammut
Central Coast Roosters (U17s G)	18 – 16	Penrith Panthers (U17s G)	Saturday, 7 February, 5:45pm	Woy Woy Oval	Lachlan Bryant
Newcastle Knights (U17s G)	24 – 6	Cronulla-Sutherland Sharks (U17s G)	Sunday, 8 February, 10:30am	Maitland Sports Ground	Riley Hayes
Round 2
Manly Warringah Sea Eagles (U17s G)	0 – 18	North Sydney Bears (U17s G)	Saturday, 14 February, 10:00am	4 Pines Park	Luke Donovan
Penrith Panthers (U17s G)	20 – 18	South Sydney Rabbitohs (U17s G)	Saturday, 14 February, 10:00am	St Marys Leagues Stadium	Harry Kontrafouris
Illawarra Steelers (U17s G)	6 – 28	Central Coast Roosters (U17s G)	Saturday, 14 February, 10:30am	Collegians Sports Stadium	Maisy Macarthur
Newcastle Knights (U17s G)	20 – 10	Wests Tigers (U17s G)	Saturday, 14 February, 10:50am	Lakeside Sporting Complex	Declan Fitzgerald
St George Dragons (U17s G)	6 – 34	Melbourne Storm (U17s G)	Saturday, 14 February, 12:00pm	Mascot Oval	Tyler Armstrong
Canterbury-Bankstown Bulldogs (U17s G)	48 – 4	Canberra Raiders (U17s G)	Saturday, 14 February, 2:00pm	Hammondville Oval	James Fitzgerald
Cronulla-Sutherland Sharks (U17s G)	6 – 32	Parramatta Eels (U17s G)	Saturday, 14 February, 3:00pm	Ocean Protect Stadium	Caitlin Sherry
Round 3
North Sydney Bears (U17s G)	10 – 62	Cronulla-Sutherland Sharks (U17s G)	Saturday, 21 February, 10:00am	Hills Grammar Oval	Tyler Armstrong
Central Coast Roosters (U17s G)	36 – 6	St George Dragons (U17s G)	Saturday, 21 February, 10:00am	Woy Woy Oval	Harry Kontrafouris
Illawarra Steelers (U17s G)	24 – 6	Manly Warringah Sea Eagles (U17s G)	Saturday, 21 February, 10:00am	WIN Stadium	Caitlin Sherry
South Sydney Rabbitohs (U17s G)	12 – 24	Wests Tigers (U17s G)	Saturday, 21 February, 10:00am	Redfern Oval	Maisy Macarthur
Canberra Raiders (U17s G)	10 – 26	Penrith Panthers (U17s G)	Saturday, 21 February, 11:00am	Raiders Belconnen	Toby Parrott
Newcastle Knights (U17s G)	46 – 12	Melbourne Storm (U17s G)	Saturday, 21 February, 12:00pm	Lakeside Sporting Complex	Declan Fitzgerald
Canterbury-Bankstown Bulldogs (U17s G)	BYE	Parramatta Eels (U17s G)
Round 4
Cronulla-Sutherland Sharks (U17s G)	62 – 0	St George Dragons (U17s G)	Saturday, 28 February, 9:30am	Ocean Protect Stadium	James Fitzgerald
Canterbury-Bankstown Bulldogs (U17s G)	32 – 4	South Sydney Rabbitohs (U17s G)	Saturday, 28 February, 10:00am	Hammondville Oval	Tyler Armstrong
Central Coast Roosters (U17s G)	14 – 36	Newcastle Knights (U17s G)	Saturday, 28 February, 10:30am	Mascot Oval	Caitlin Sherry
Illawarra Steelers (U17s G)	4 – 48	Parramatta Eels (U17s G)	Saturday, 28 February, 11:00am	James Hardie Centre of Excellence	Oscar Mayer
Canberra Raiders (U17s G)	16 – 16	Melbourne Storm (U17s G)	Saturday, 28 February, 11:45am	Raiders Belconnen	Harry Kontrafouris
North Sydney Bears (U17s G)	0 – 50	Penrith Panthers (U17s G)	Saturday, 28 February, 4:30pm	St Marys Leagues Stadium	Jack Chapman
Manly Warringah Sea Eagles (U17s G)	BYE	Wests Tigers (U17s G)
Round 5
Penrith Panthers (U17s G)	14 – 34	Canterbury-Bankstown Bulldogs (U17s G)	Saturday, 7 March, 10:00am	Blacktown International Sports Park	Jack Chapman
Parramatta Eels (U17s G)	54 – 14	North Sydney Bears (U17s G)	Saturday, 7 March, 10:00am	Eric Tweedale Stadium	Luke Heiler
South Sydney Rabbitohs (U17s G)	6 – 50	Newcastle Knights (U17s G)	Saturday, 7 March, 10:30am	Redfern Oval	Oscar Mayer
Cronulla-Sutherland Sharks (U17s G)	40 – 10	Illawarra Steelers (U17s G)	Saturday, 7 March, 11:00am	Cronulla High School	Harry Kontrafouris
Canberra Raiders (U17s G)	34 – 6	Manly Warringah Sea Eagles (U17s G)	Saturday, 7 March, 12:00pm	Raiders Belconnen	Caitlin Sherry
Melbourne Storm (U17s G)	14 – 26	Wests Tigers (U17s G)	Saturday, 7 March, 12:30pm	Seabrook Reserve	Isabella Putaura
St George Dragons (U17s G)	BYE	Central Coast Roosters (U17s G)
Round 6
St George Dragons (U17s G)	16 – 18	North Sydney Bears (U17s G)	Saturday, 14 March, 10:00am	Collegians Sports Stadium	Maisy Macarthur
South Sydney Rabbitohs (U17s G)	20 – 22	Parramatta Eels (U17s G)	Saturday, 14 March, 10:30am	Redfern Oval	Tallon Irons
Penrith Panthers (U17s G)	18 – 24	Newcastle Knights (U17s G)	Saturday, 14 March, 10:30am	Blacktown International Sports Park	Jack Catania
Melbourne Storm (U17s G)	48 – 0	Cronulla-Sutherland Sharks (U17s G)	Saturday, 14 March, 12:30pm	Casey Fields	Achillies Ngaue
Canterbury-Bankstown Bulldogs (U17s G)	50 – 0	Illawarra Steelers (U17s G)	Saturday, 14 March, 2:00pm	Hammondville Oval	Aleksandr Fitzgerald
Central Coast Roosters (U17s G)	42 – 20	Canberra Raiders (U17s G)	Saturday, 14 March, 3:00pm	Mascot Oval	Toby Parrott
Manly Warringah Sea Eagles (U17s G)	0 – 34	Wests Tigers (U17s G)	Sunday, 15 March, 10:00am	Sydney Academy of Sport	Ben Thompson
Round 7
North Sydney Bears (U17s G)	4 – 64	Central Coast Roosters (U17s G)	Saturday, 21 March, 10:00am	Aubrey Keech Reserve	Josh Leigh
St George Dragons (U17s G)	0 – 32	South Sydney Rabbitohs (U17s G)	Saturday, 21 March, 10:00am	Collegians Sports Stadium	Luke Heiler
Parramatta Eels (U17s G)	68 – 0	Manly Warringah Sea Eagles (U17s G)	Saturday, 21 March, 10:00am	Eric Tweedale Stadium	Oscar Mayer
Wests Tigers (U17s G)	18 – 6	Illawarra Steelers (U17s G)	Saturday, 21 March, 11:00am	Kirkham Oval	Travis Cochrane
Melbourne Storm (U17s G)	6 – 28	Canterbury-Bankstown Bulldogs (U17s G)	Saturday, 21 March, 12:30pm	Casey Fields	Isabella Putaura
Newcastle Knights (U17s G)	BYE	Canberra Raiders (U17s G)
Cronulla-Sutherland Sharks (U17s G)	BYE	Penrith Panthers (U17s G)
Round 8
Parramatta Eels (U17s G)	22 – 14	Central Coast Roosters (U17s G)	Saturday, 28 March, 10:00am	Eric Tweedale Stadium	Jack Catania
Newcastle Knights (U17s G)	30 – 6	Canberra Raiders (U17s G)	Saturday, 28 March, 10:30am	Cessnock Sportsground	Luke Heiler
Penrith Panthers (U17s G)	32 – 16	Cronulla-Sutherland Sharks (U17s G)	Saturday, 28 March, 10:30am	St Marys Leagues Stadium	Maisy Macarthur
Manly Warringah Sea Eagles (U17s G)	6 – 22	St George Dragons (U17s G)	Sunday, 29 March 10:00am	Sydney Academy of Sport	Toby Parrott
Wests Tigers (U17s G)	4 – 22	Canterbury-Bankstown Bulldogs (U17s G)	Sunday, 29 March, 1:30pm	Leichhardt Oval	Tallon Irons
North Sydney Bears (U17s G)	BYE	South Sydney Rabbitohs (U17s G)
Illawarra Steelers (U17s G)	BYE	Melbourne Storm (U17s G)
Round 9 (Easter Round)
Cronulla-Sutherland Sharks (U17s G)	V	Canberra Raiders (U17s G)	Friday, 3 April, 12:00pm	Ocean Protect Stadium	Harry Kontrafouris
Manly Warringah Sea Eagles (U17s G)	V	South Sydney Rabbitohs (U17s G)	Saturday, 4 April, 10:00am	Sydney Academy of Sport	William Keep
Parramatta Eels (U17s G)	V	Canterbury-Bankstown Bulldogs (U17s G)	Saturday, 4 April, 10:00am	James Hardie Centre of Excellence	Travis Cochrane
North Sydney Bears (U17s G)	V	Newcastle Knights (U17s G)	Saturday, 4 April, 10:30am	Hills Grammar Oval	Luke Donovan
Wests Tigers (U17s G)	V	Central Coast Roosters (U17s G)	Saturday, 4 April, 1:30pm	Leichhardt Oval	Lachlan Lucas
Illawarra Steelers (U17s G)	V	Melbourne Storm (U17s G)	Saturday, 4 April, 2:40pm	Collegians Sports Stadium	Oscar Mayer
St George Dragons (U17s G)	V	Penrith Panthers (U17s G)	Sunday, 5 April, 10:00am	Jubilee Stadium	Declan Fitzgerald
Finals Series
Qualifying & Elimination Finals
1st Place	V	4th Place	11/12 April	TBA	TBA
2nd Place	V	3rd Place	11/12 April	TBA	TBA
5th Place	V	8th Place	11/12 April	TBA	TBA
6th Place	V	7th Place	11/12 April	TBA	TBA
Semi-Finals
QF1 Loser	V	EF1 Winner	18/19 April	TBA	TBA
QF2 Loser	V	EF2 Winner	18/19 April	TBA	TBA
Preliminary Finals
QF2 Winner	V	SF1 Winner	25/26 April	TBA	TBA
QF1 Winner	V	SF2 Winner	25/26 April	TBA	TBA
Grand Final
PF1 Winner	V	PF2 Winner	2/3 May	TBA	TBA

=== Grand Final ===
Qualifying & Elimination Finals
1
4
5
8
6
7
2
3

Semi-Finals
1/4
5/8
2/3
6/7

Preliminary Finals
1/4
2/3/6/7
2/3
1/4/5/8

Grand Final

2026 Metro Lisa Fiaola Cup Grand Final

2/3 May 2026
TBA

PF1 Winner	v	PF2 Winner

TBA

== Lisa Fiaola Cup (Regional) ==
2026 Westpac Regional Lisa Fiaola Cup
- Duration: 31 January – 28 March 2026
- Teams: 6
- Broadcast partners: Streaming; BarTV Sports (All Matches)

The Lisa Fiaola Cup (regional conference, named the Westpac Regional Lisa Fiaola Cup for sponsorship reasons) mirrors the metropolitan competition for players based in regional and country New South Wales. It allows talented young female players outside Sydney to access the same level of high-performance competition and coaching as their metropolitan counterparts, as part of the wider Lisa Fiaola Cup pathway.

=== Teams ===
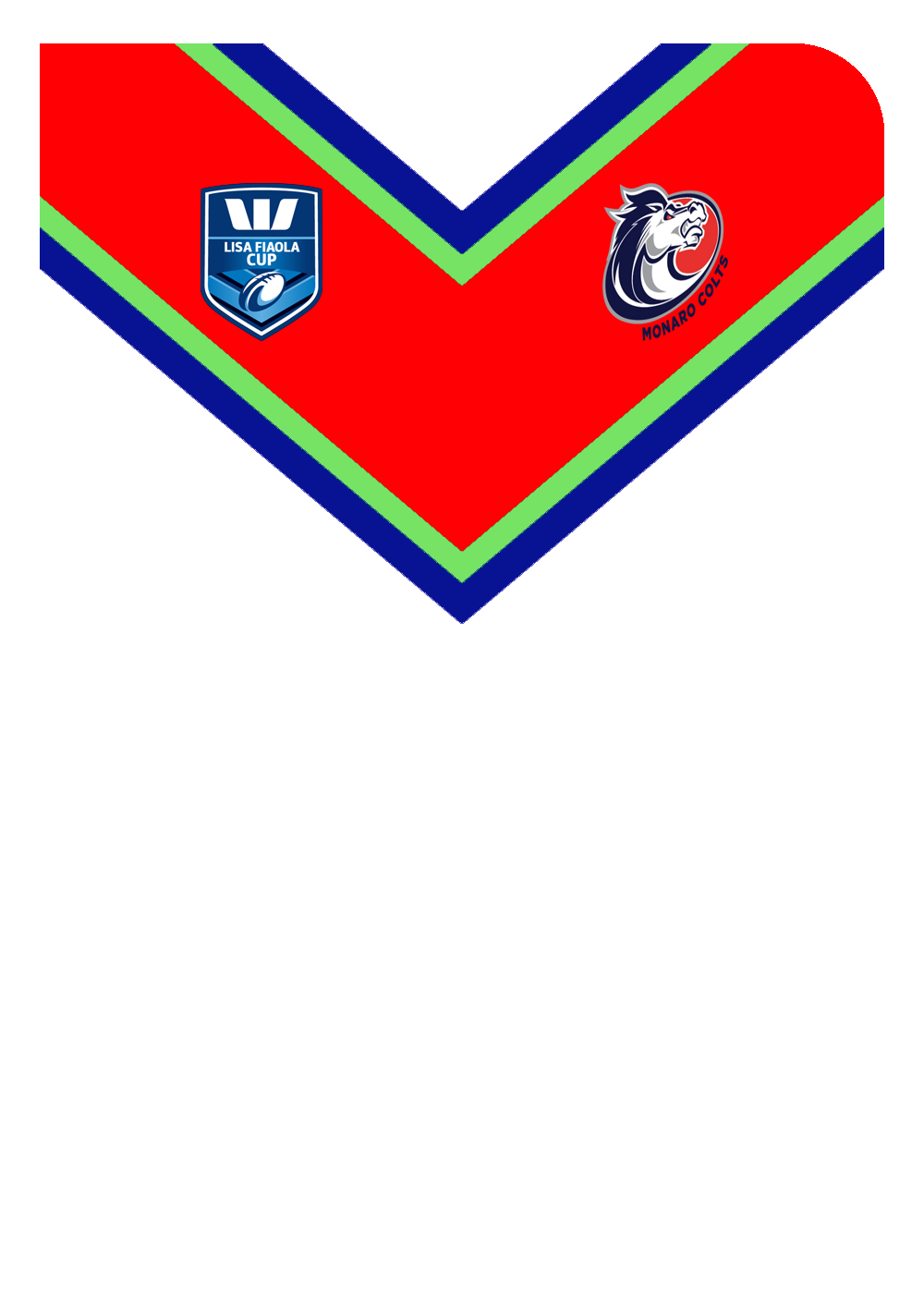
Monaro; Colts Ground: Seiffert Oval City/Suburb: Queanbeyan (Queanbeyan East) Head coach: TBA

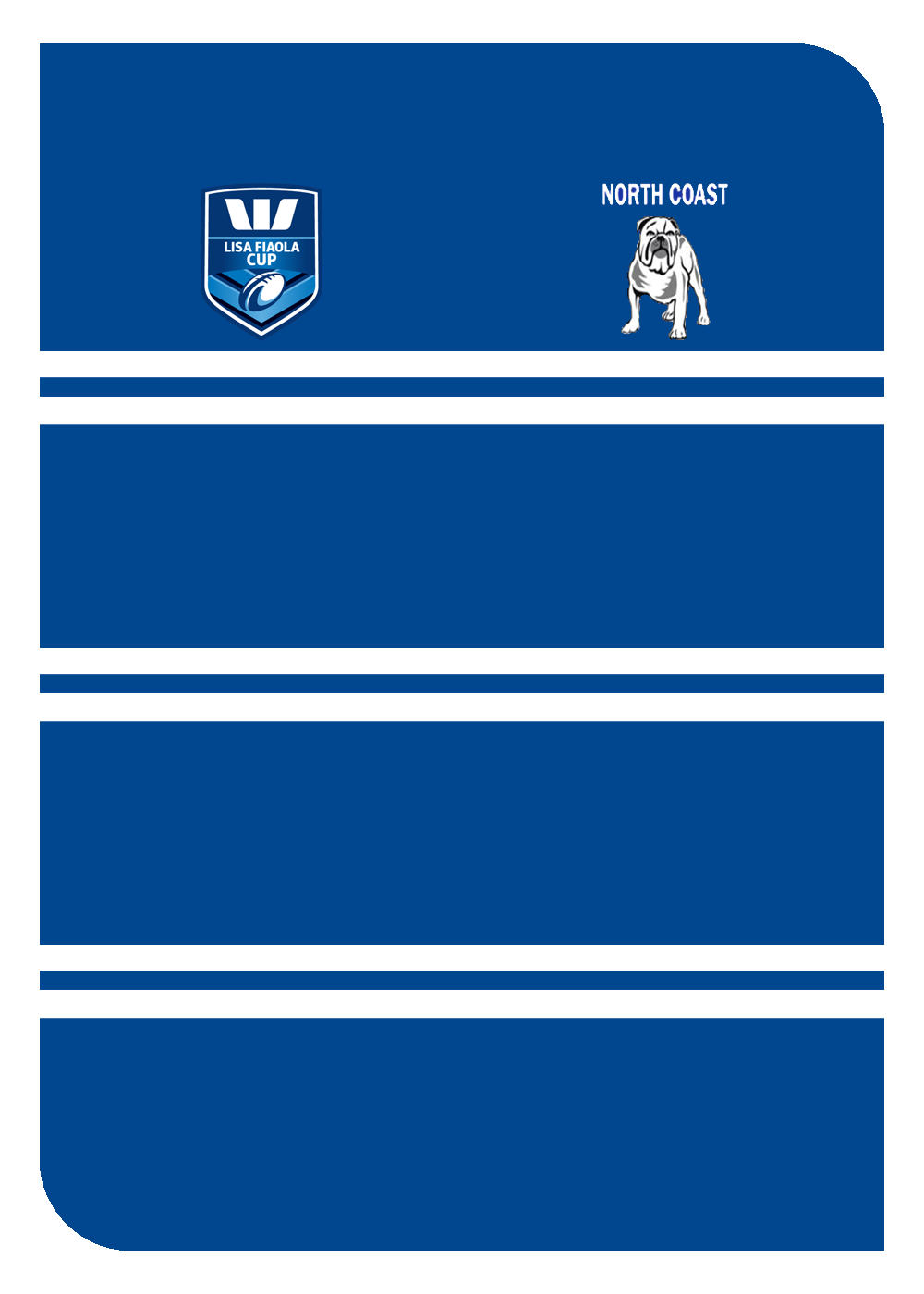
North Coast; Bulldogs Ground: Port Macquarie Regional Stadium City/Suburb: Port Macquarie Head coach: TBA

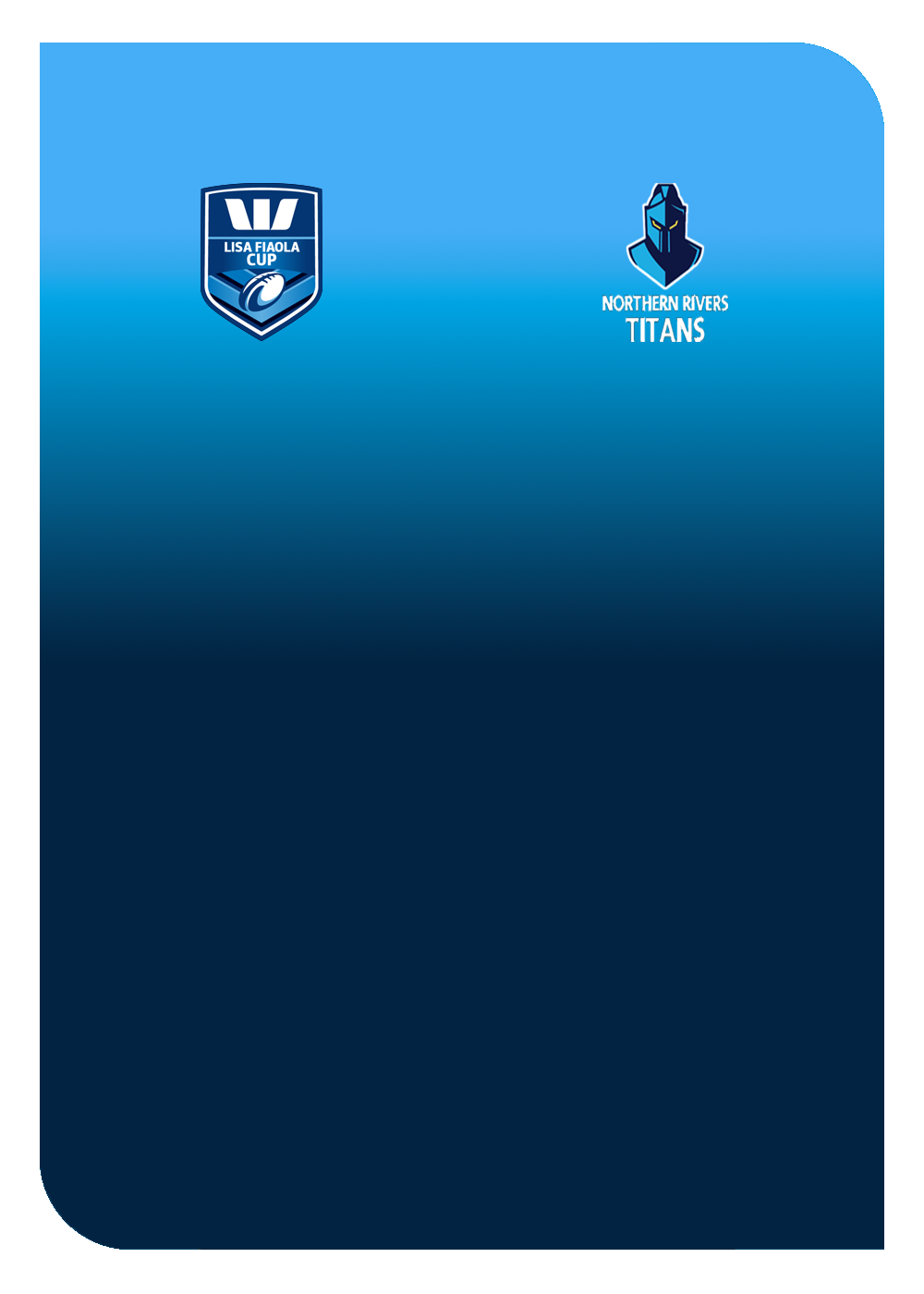
Northern Rivers; Titans Ground: Crozier Field City/Suburb: Lismore (Lismore) Head coach: TBA

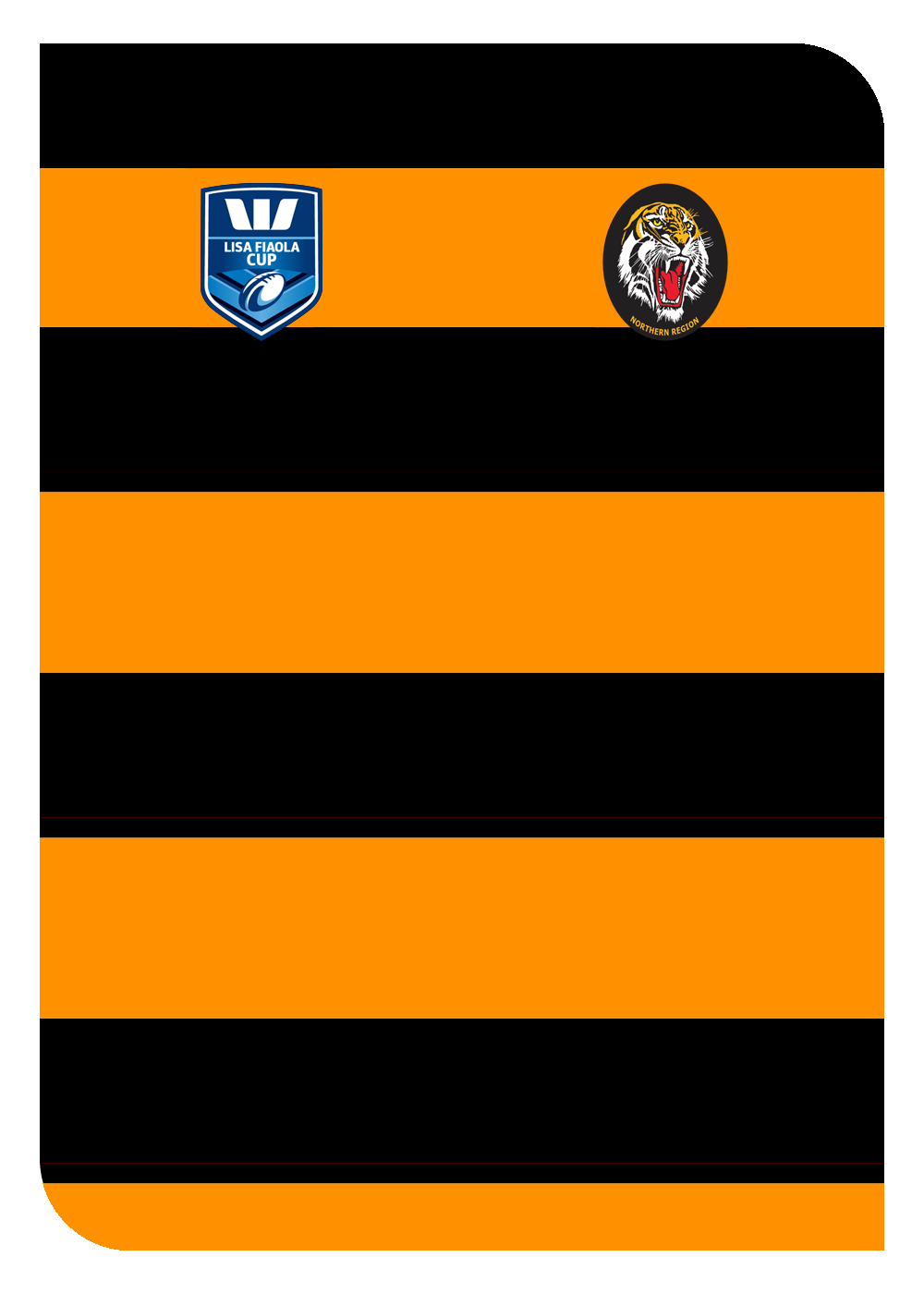
Northern; Tigers Ground: Scully Park City/Suburb: Tamworth (West Tamworth) Head coach: TBA

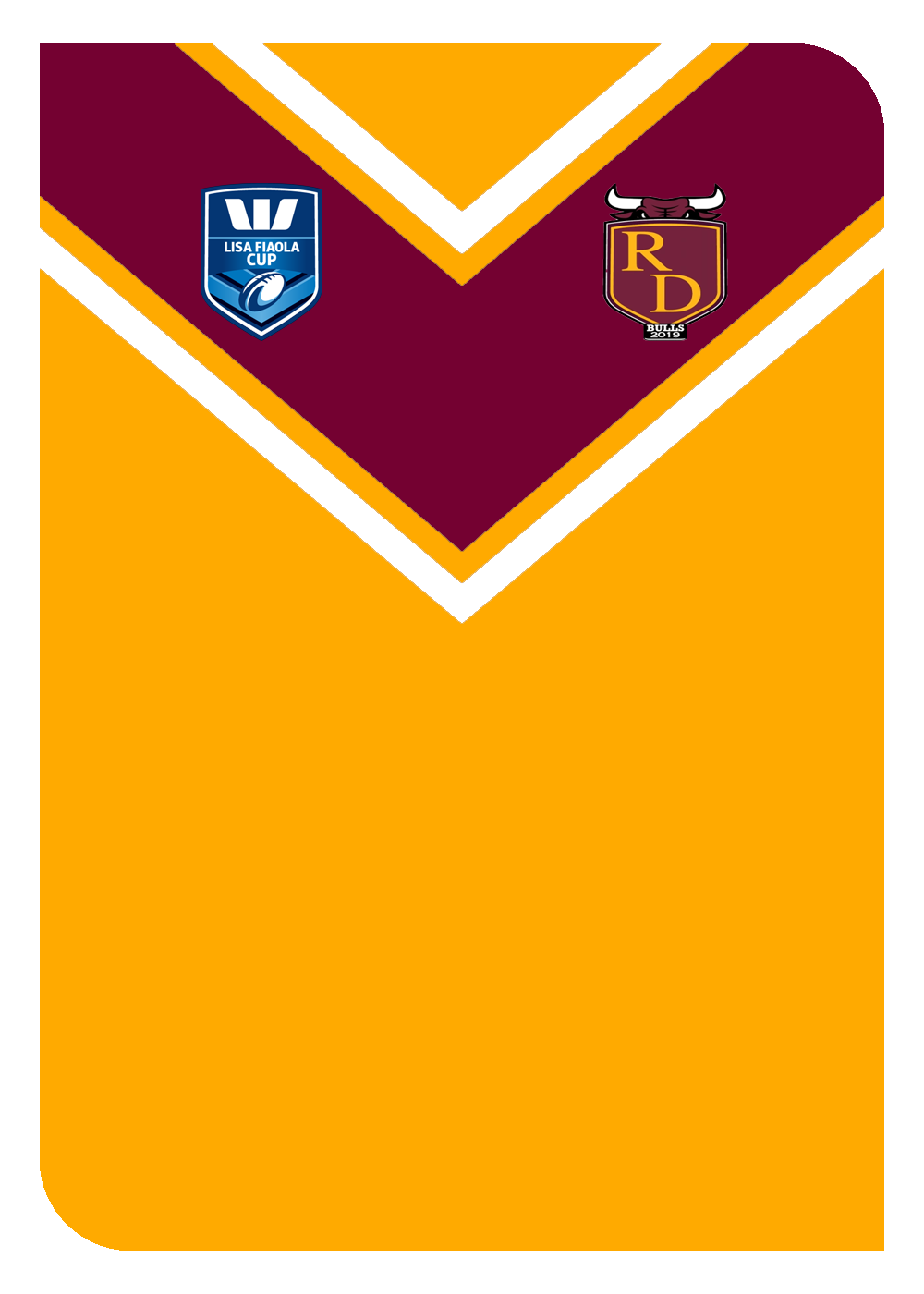
Riverina; Bulls Ground: GeoHex Park City/Suburb: Wagga Wagga (East Wagga Wagga) Head coach: TBA

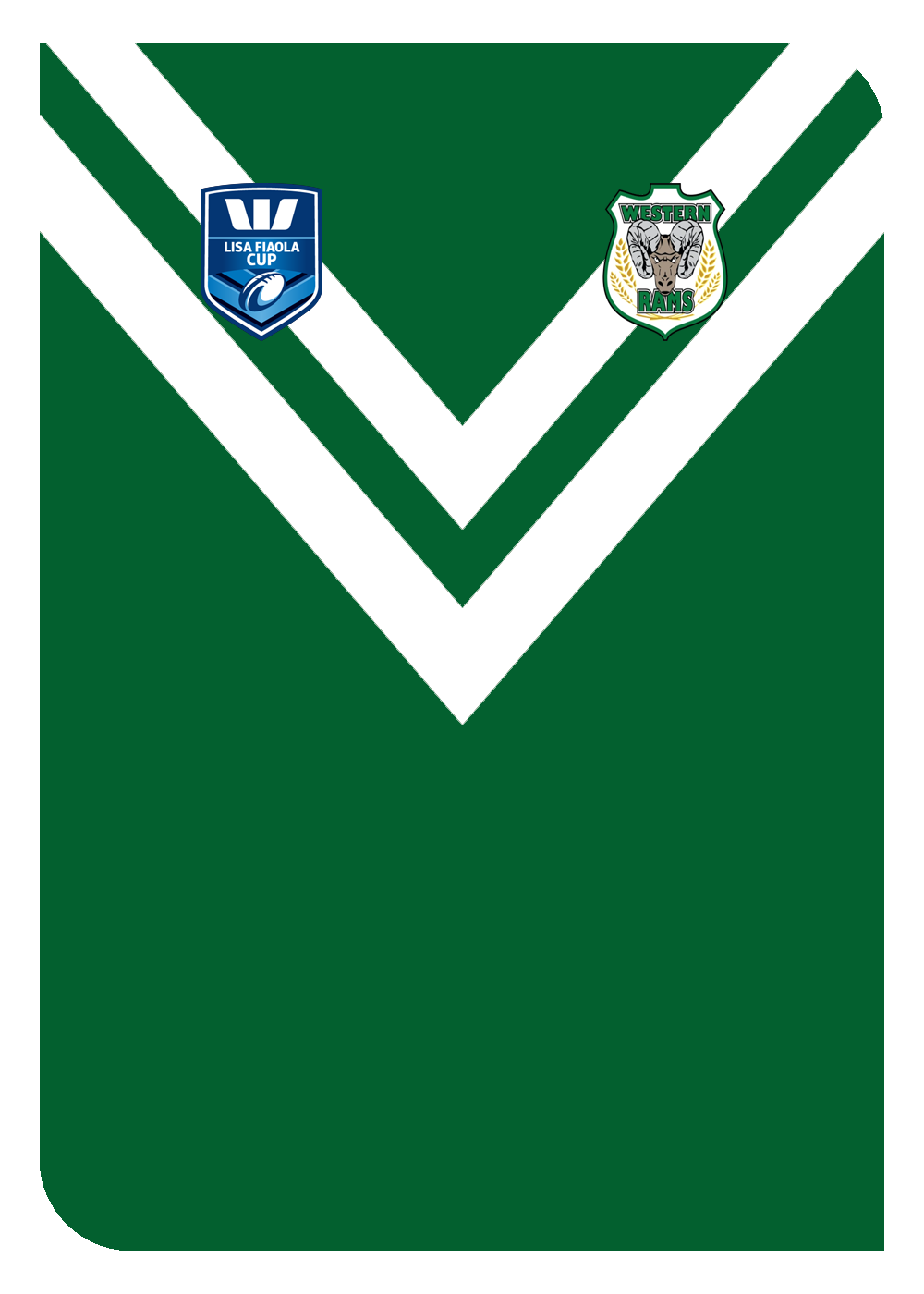
Western; Rams Ground: Carrington Park City/Suburb: Bathurst (Bathurst) Head coach: TBA

=== Ladder ===
Pos	Team	Pld	W	D	L	B	PF	PA	PD	Pts	Qualification
1	Western Rams (U17s G)	5	5	0	0	1	190	34	+156	12	Semi-Finals
2	North Coast Bulldogs (U17s G)	5	4	0	1	1	82	68	+14	10	Semi-Finals
3	Northern Tigers (U17s G)	5	3	0	2	1	142	72	+70	8	Semi-Finals
4	Riverina Bulls (U17s G)	5	2	0	3	1	104	96	+8	6	Semi-Finals
5	Northern Rivers Titans (U17s G)	5	1	0	4	1	58	122	–64	4	
6	Monaro Colts (U17s G)	5	0	0	5	1	18	202	-184	2	

Updated to match(es) played on unknown. Source:
Rules for classification: 1) points; 2) point difference; 3) points scored

==== Ladder Progression ====
- Numbers highlighted in green indicate that the team finished the round inside the top 4.
- Numbers highlighted in blue indicates the team finished first on the ladder in that round.
- Numbers highlighted in red indicates the team finished last place on the ladder in that round.
- Underlined numbers indicate that the team had a bye during that round.

Pos	Team	1	2	3	4	5	6
1	Western Rams (U17s G)	2	4	6	8	10	12
2	North Coast Bulldogs (U17s G)	0	2	4	6	8	10
3	Northern Tigers (U17s G)	2	2	4	6	6	8
4	Riverina Bulls (U17s G)	0	2	4	4	6	6
5	Northern Rivers Titans (U17s G)	2	2	2	4	4	4
6	Monaro Colts (U17s G)	0	0	2	2	2	2

Season Results:

Home	Score	Away	Match Information
Home	Score	Away	Date and Time	Venue	Referee	Video
Round 1 (Magic Round)
Northern Tigers (U17s G)	28 – 12	Riverina Bulls (U17s G)	Saturday, 31 January, 9:30am	Pirtek Park	Riley Hayes
Monaro Colts (U17s G)	8 – 26	Northern Rivers Titans (U17s G)	Saturday, 31 January, 9:30am	Seiffert Oval	Maisy Macarthur
North Coast Bulldogs (U17s G)	10 – 20	Western Rams (U17s G)	Saturday, 31 January, 9:30am	David Campese Oval	Caitlin Sherry
Round 2
North Coast Bulldogs (U17s G)	14 – 0	Monaro Colts (U17s G)	Saturday, 7 February, 9:00am	Port Macquarie Regional Stadium	Jacob Nelson
Western Rams (U17s G)	26 – 6	Northern Tigers (U17s G)	Saturday, 7 February, 11:30am	Tony Luchetti Sportsground	Maisy Macarthur
Riverina Bulls (U17s G)	16 – 12	Northern Rivers Titans (U17s G)	Sunday, 8 February, 9:00am	GeoHex Park	Jack Catania
Round 3
Northern Rivers Titans (U17s G)	14 – 16	North Coast Bulldogs (U17s G)	Saturday, 14 February, 12:50pm	Crozier Field	Riley Hayes
Monaro Colts (U17s G)	BYE	Northern Tigers (U17s G)
Riverina Bulls (U17s G)	BYE	Western Rams (U17s G)
Round 4
Northern Tigers (U17s G)	52 – 4	Monaro Colts (U17s G)	Saturday, 21 February, 10:00am	Scone Park	Luke Donovan
Western Rams (U17s G)	32 – 18	Riverina Bulls (U17s G)	Saturday, 21 February, 12:50pm	Jock Colley Oval	Jack Chapman
North Coast Bulldogs (U17s G)	BYE	Northern Rivers Titans (U17s G)
Round 5
Northern Tigers (U17s G)	18 – 24	North Coast Bulldogs (U17s G)	Saturday, 28 February, 9:20am	Scully Park	Luke Donovan
Northern Rivers Titans (U17s G)	0 – 44	Western Rams (U17s G)	Saturday, 28 February, 1:00pm	Crozier Field	Lincoln Close
Riverina Bulls (U17s G)	42 – 6	Monaro Colts (U17s G)	Sunday, 1 March, 9:30am	Laurie Daley Oval	Toby Parrott
Round 6
North Coast Bulldogs (U17s G)	18 – 16	Riverina Bulls (U17s G)	Saturday, 7 March, 9:00am	Port Macquarie Regional Stadium	Nicholas Willer
Northern Rivers Titans (U17s G)	6 – 38	Northern Tigers (U17s G)	Saturday, 7 March, 11:00am	Crozier Field	Lincoln Close
Monaro Colts (U17s G)	0 – 68	Western Rams (U17s G)	Saturday, 7 March, 12:20pm	Seiffert Oval	Tyler Armstrong
Finals Series
Semi-Finals
North Coast Bulldogs (U17s G)	10 – 36	Northern Tigers (U17s G)	Sunday, 22 March, 10:20am	Crozier Field	Riley Hayes
Western Rams (U17s G)	16 – 26	Riverina Bulls (U17s G)	Sunday, 22 March, 1:00pm	Glen Willow Regional Sports Stadium	Jack Catania
Grand Final
Northern Tigers (U17s G)	26 – 18	Riverina Bulls (U17s G)	Saturday, 28 March, 10:00am	Port Macquarie Regional Stadium	James Fitzgerald

=== Grand Final ===
Semi-Finals
1	Western	16
4	Riverina	26
2	North Coast	10
3	Northern	36

Grand Final
Northern	26
Riverina	18

2026 Regional Lisa Fiaola Cup Grand Final

Saturday, 28 March 2026
10:00am

Northern Tigers (U17s G)	26 – 18	Riverina Bulls (U17s G)

Port Macquarie Regional Stadium, Port Macquarie
Referee: James Fitzgerald
Touch judges: Sam Wilkinson & Riley Hayes

== Andrew Johns Cup ==
2026 SLE Andrew Johns Cup
- Duration: 31 January – 28 March 2026
- Teams: 10
- Broadcast partners: Streaming; BarTV Sports (All Matches)

The Andrew Johns Cup (named the SLE Andrew Johns Cup for sponsorship reasons) is a regional representative competition for younger teenage male players held across country New South Wales. Named after former New South Wales halfback Andrew Johns, it sits alongside the SLE Laurie Daley Cup in the NSWRL's Country Rugby League pathways structure.

=== Teams ===
==== Club Changes ====
- Illawarra-South Coast Dragons rennamed to Illawarra-South Coast Steelers for 2026.

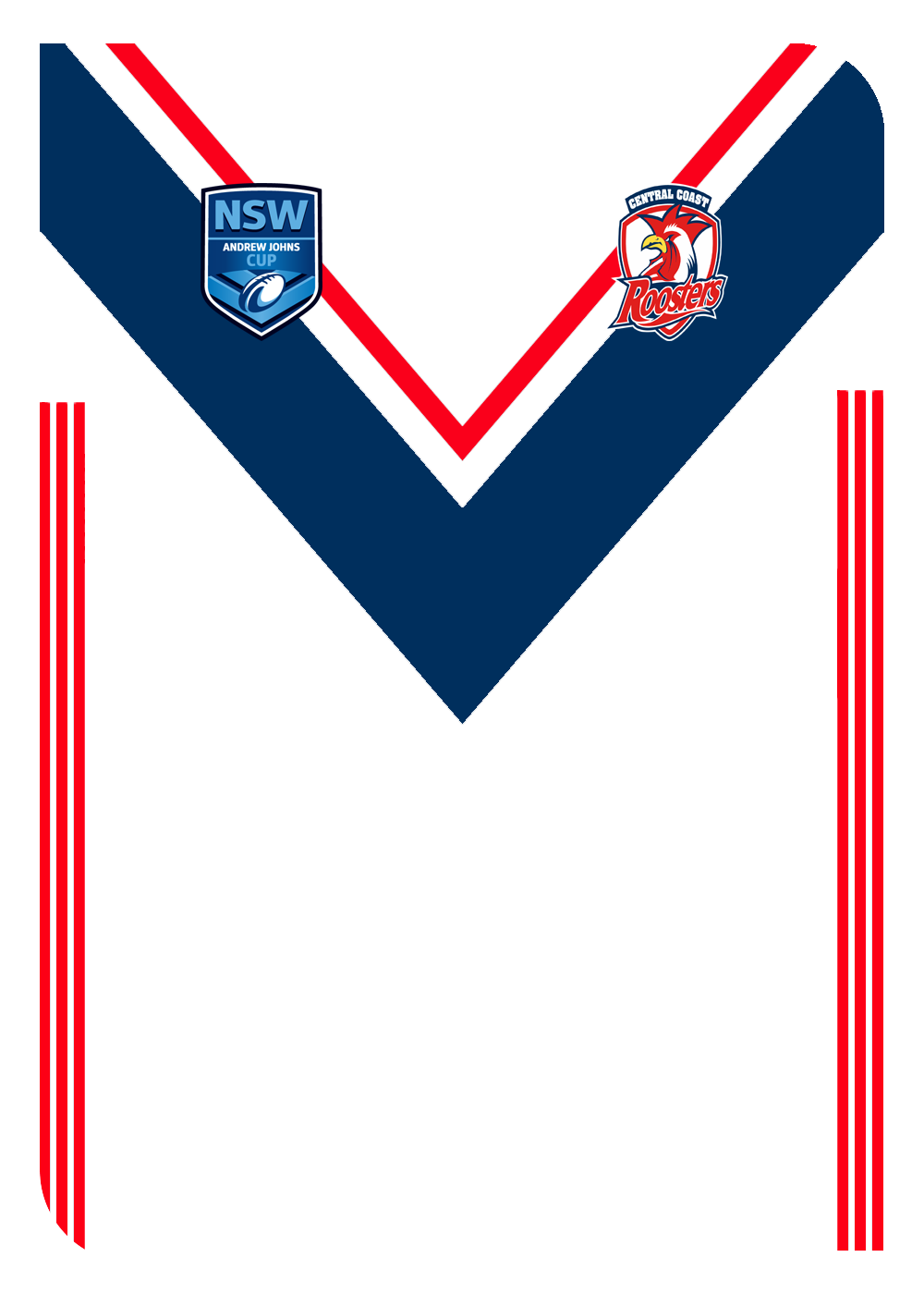
Central Coast; Roosters Ground: Woy Woy Oval City/Suburb: Woy Woy (Woy Woy) Head coach: TBA

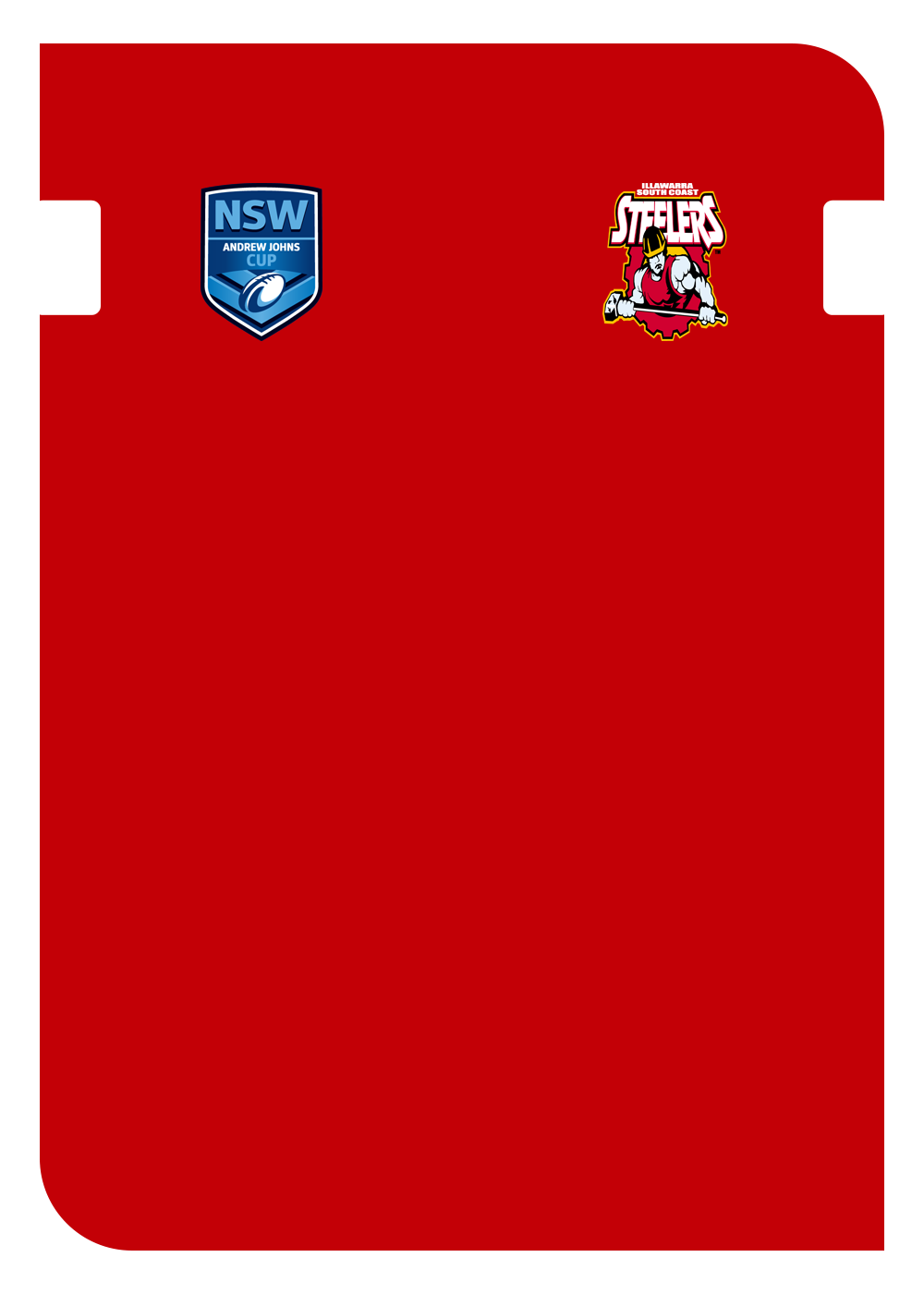
Illawarra-South Coast; Steelers Ground: Collegians Sports Stadium City/Suburb: Wollongong (Figtree) Head coach: TBA

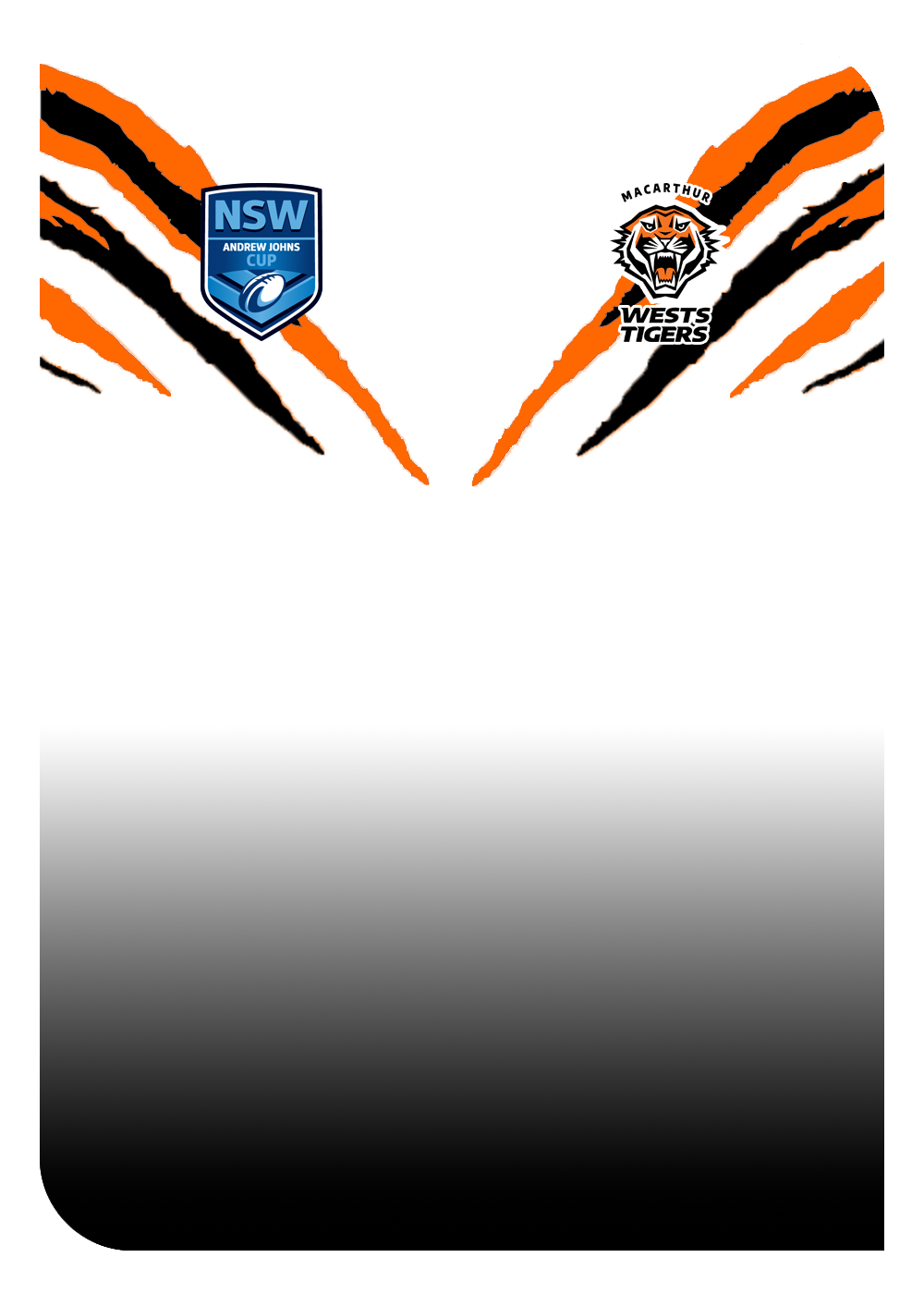
Macarthur-Wests; Tigers Ground: Kirkham Oval City/Suburb: Sydney (Elderslie) Head coach: TBA

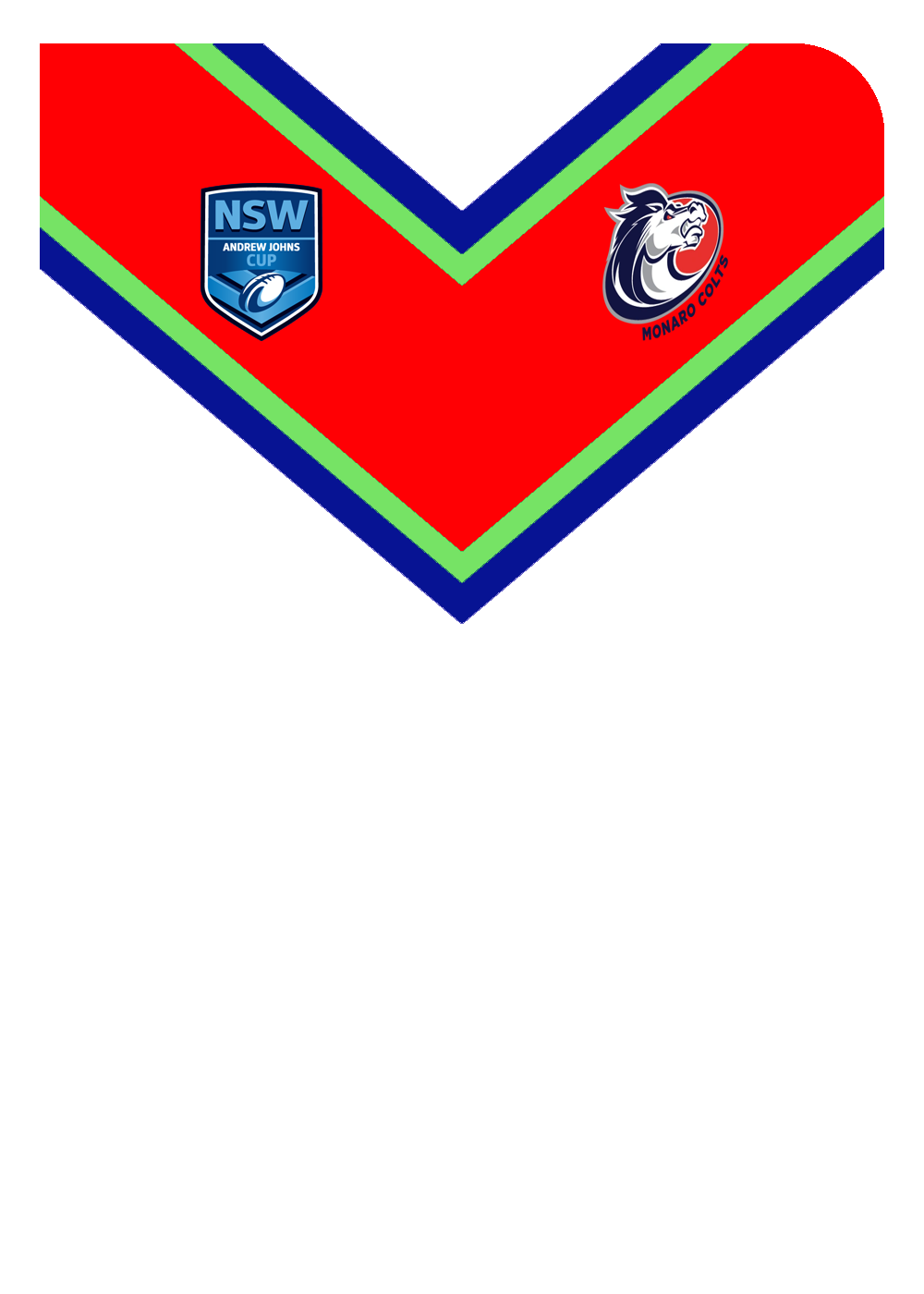
Monaro; Colts Ground: Seiffert Oval City/Suburb: Queanbeyan (Queanbeyan East) Head coach: TBA

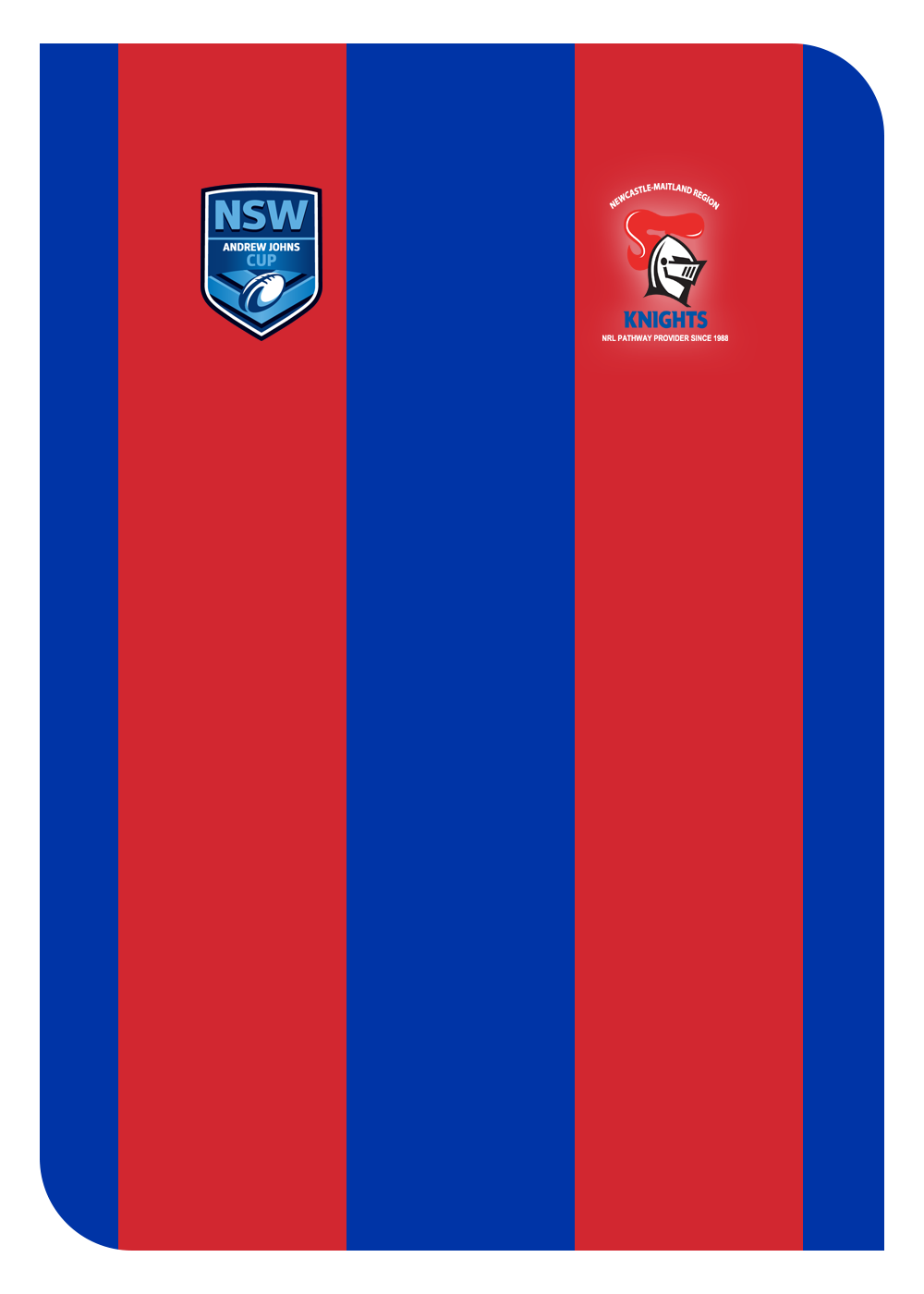
Newcastle-Maitland Region; Knights Ground: Lakeside Sporting Complex City/Suburb: Raymond Terrace Head coach: TBA

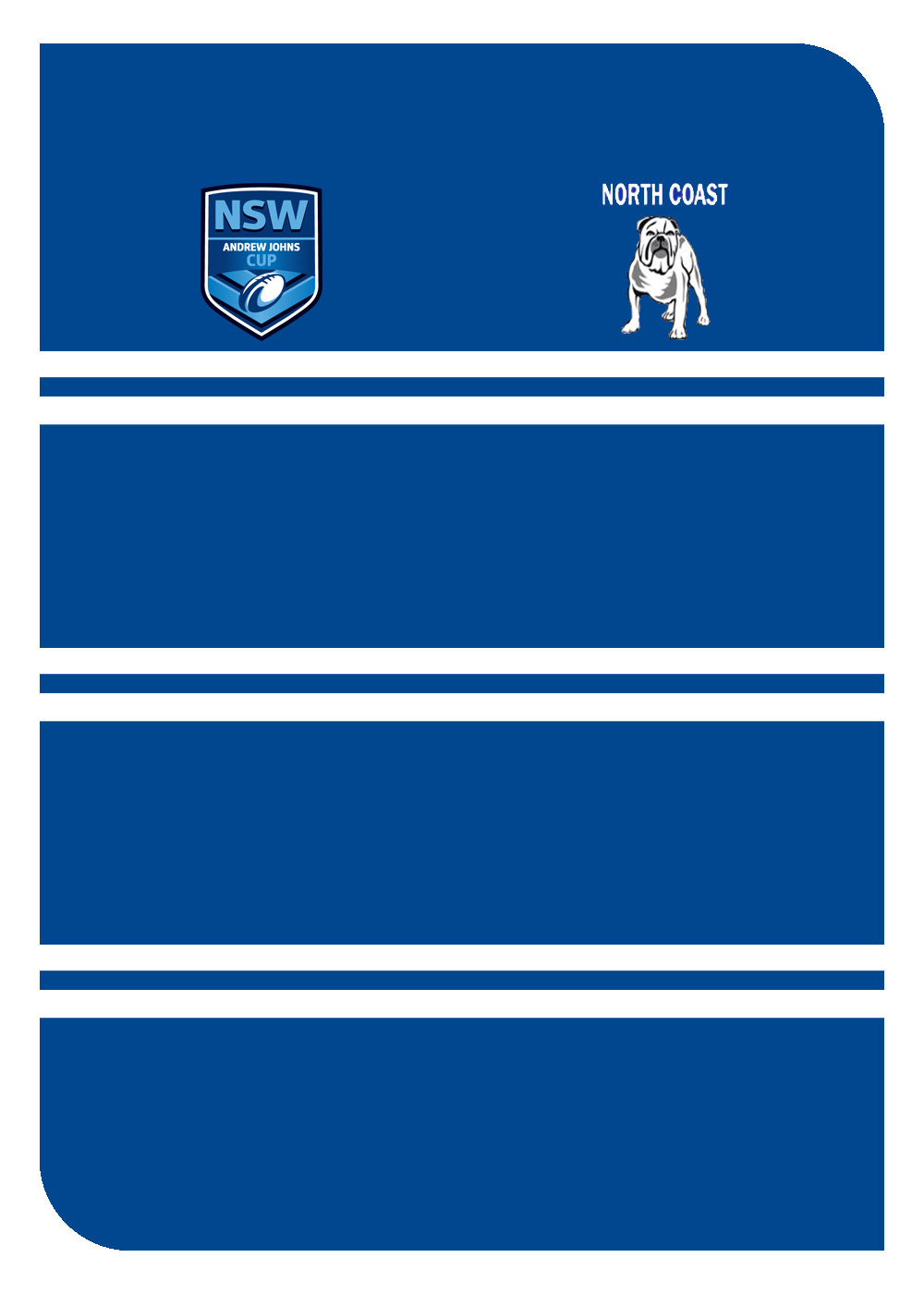
North Coast; Bulldogs Ground: Port Macquarie Regional Stadium City/Suburb: Port Macquarie Head coach: TBA

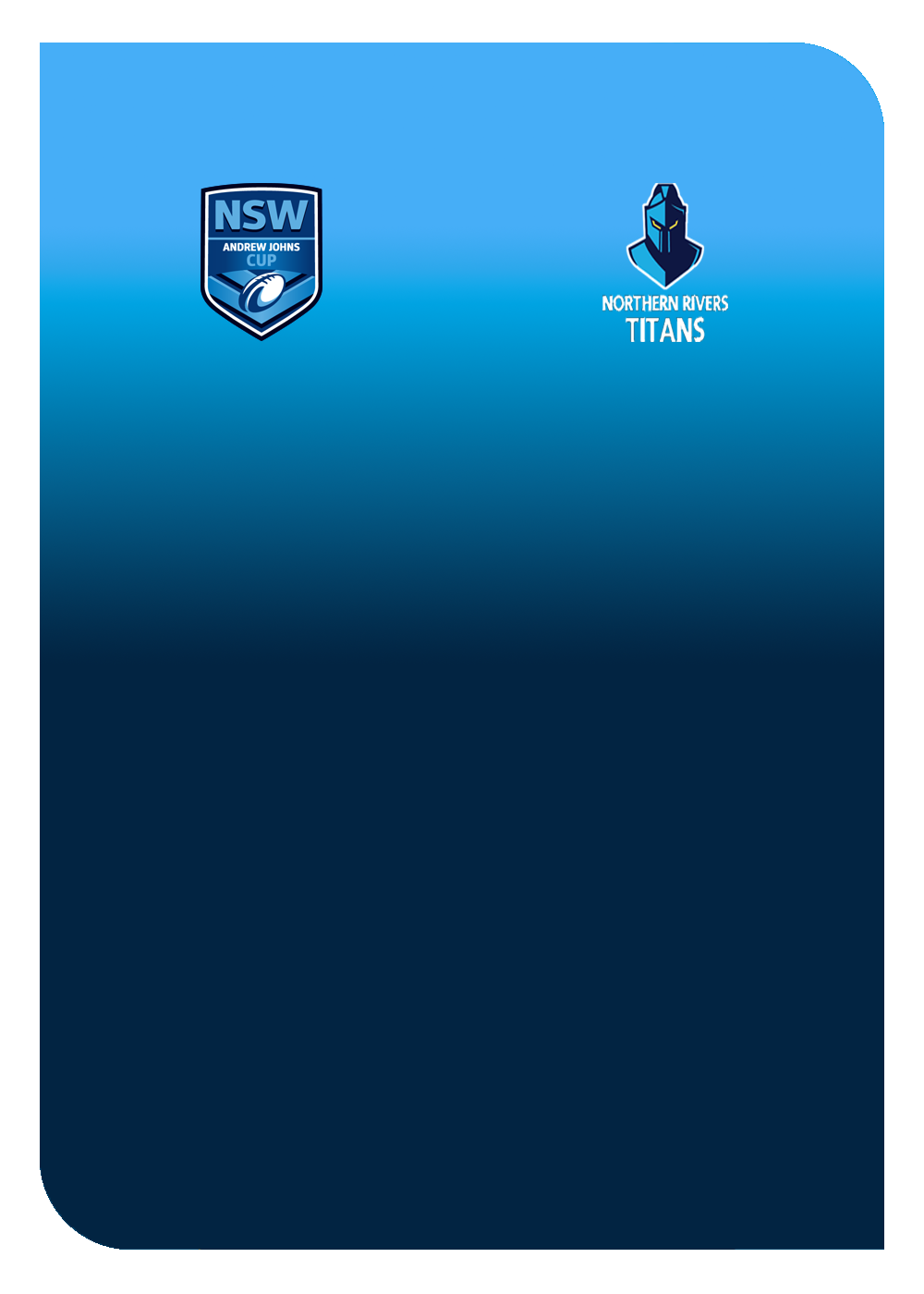
Northern Rivers; Titans Ground: Crozier Field City/Suburb: Lismore (Lismore) Head coach: TBA

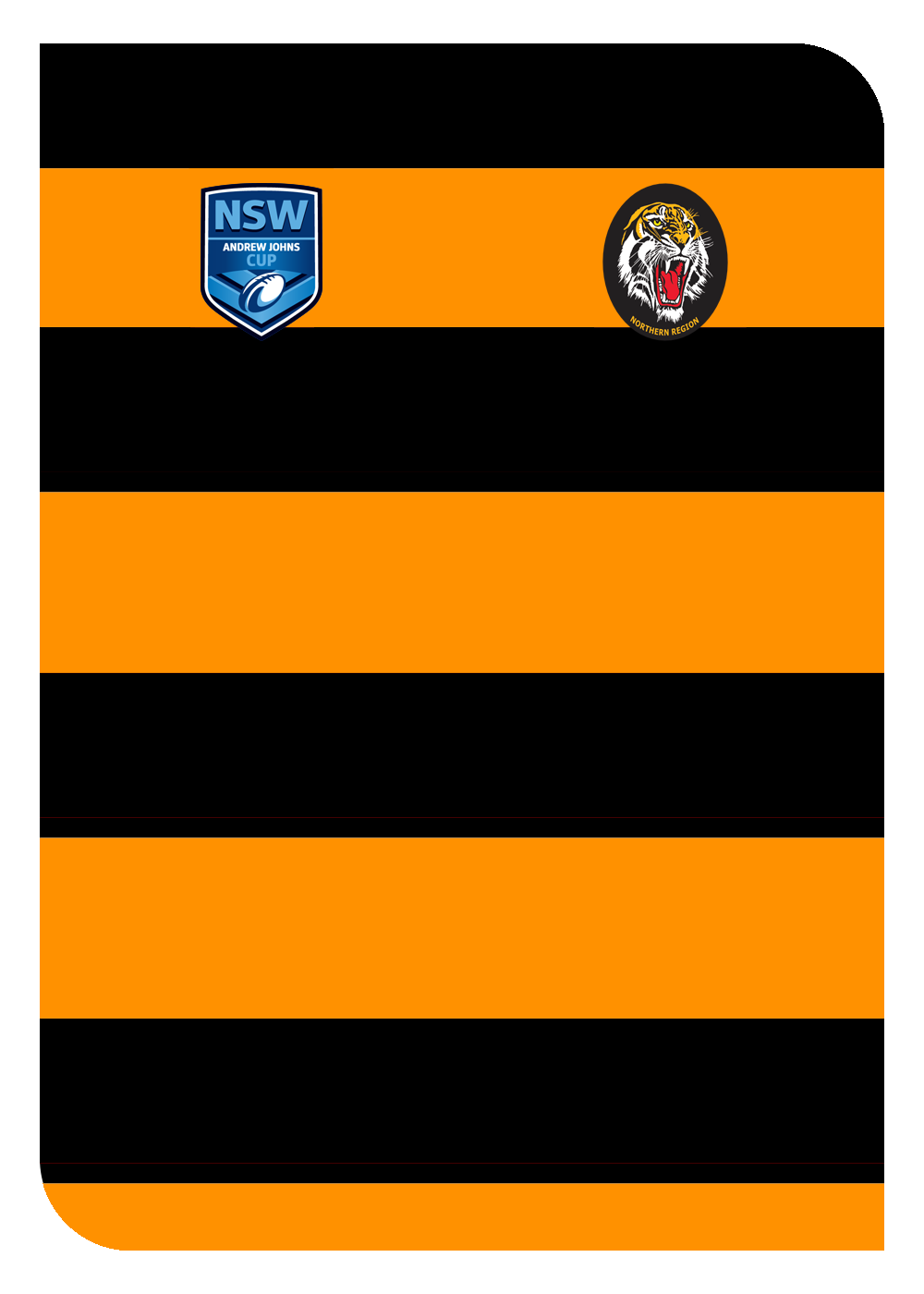
Northern; Tigers Ground: Scully Park City/Suburb: Tamworth (West Tamworth) Head coach: TBA

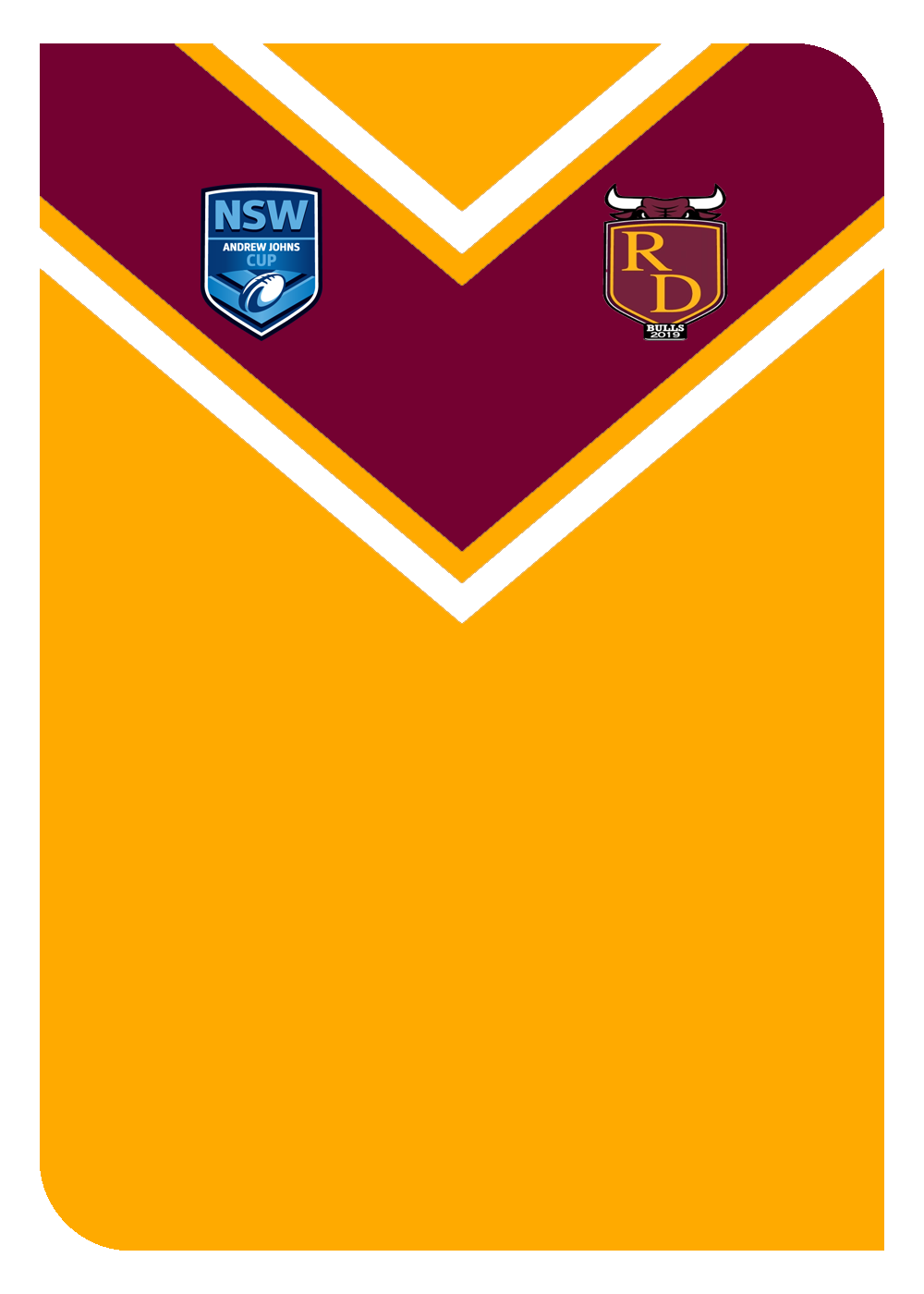
Riverina; Bulls Ground: GeoHex Park City/Suburb: Wagga Wagga (East Wagga Wagga) Head coach: TBA

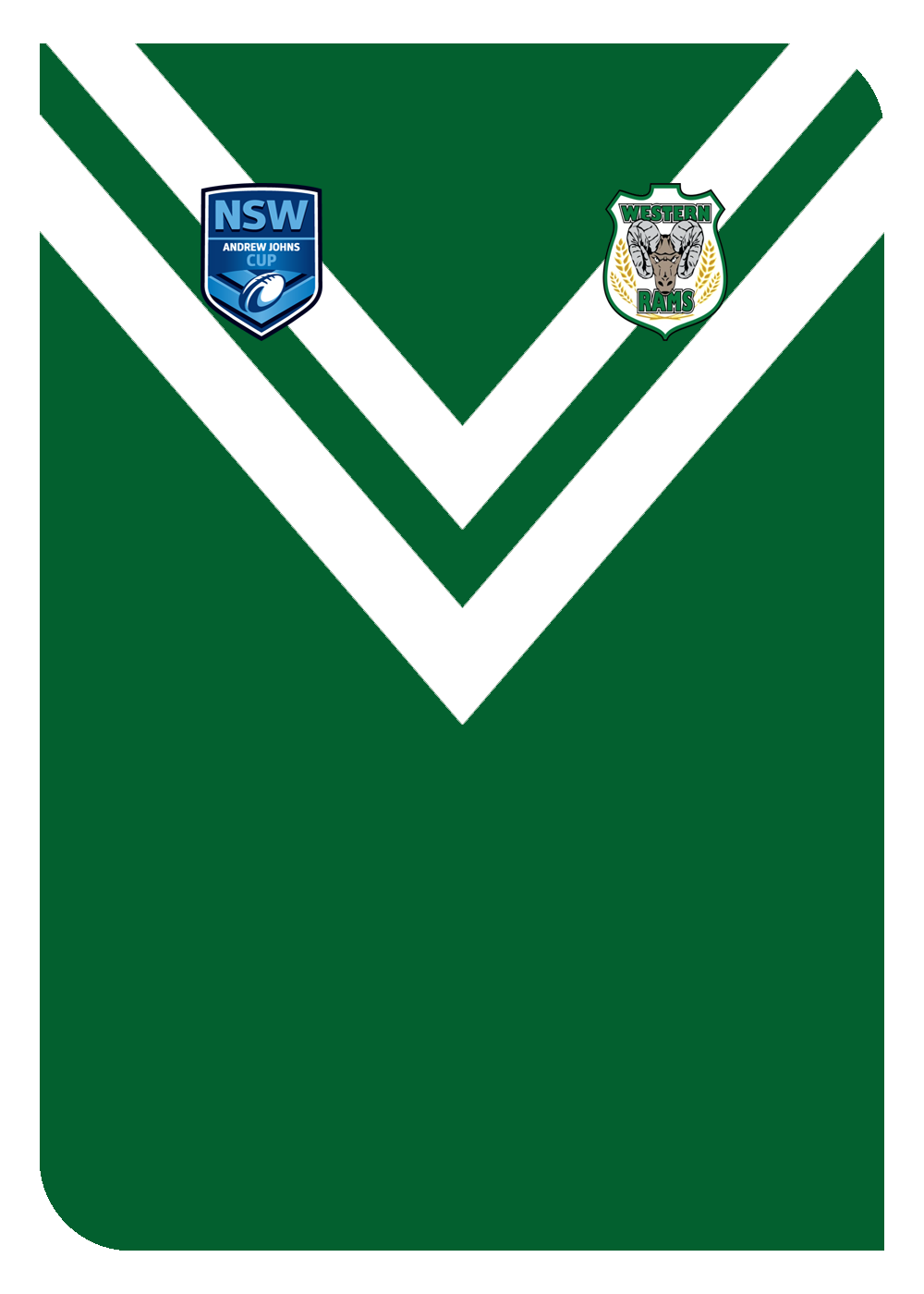
Western; Rams Ground: Carrington Park City/Suburb: Bathurst (Bathurst) Head coach: TBA

=== Ladder ===
Northern Conference

Pos	Team	Pld	W	D	L	B	PF	PA	PD	Pts	Qualification
1	Newcastle-Maitland Region Knights (U16s)	5	5	0	0	1	128	56	+72	12	Semi-Finals
2	North Coast Bulldogs (U16s)	5	3	0	2	1	142	123	+19	8	Semi-Finals
3	Central Coast Roosters (U16s)	5	2	0	3	1	114	110	+4	6	
4	Northern Rivers Titans (U16s)	5	2	0	3	1	63	98	–35	6	
5	Northern Tigers (U16s)	5	0	0	5	1	68	136	–68	2	

Updated to match(es) played on unknown. Source:
Rules for classification: 1) points; 2) point difference; 3) points scored

Southern Conference

Pos	Team	Pld	W	D	L	B	PF	PA	PD	Pts	Qualification
1	Macarthur-Wests Tigers (U16s)	5	5	0	0	1	134	76	+58	12	Semi-Finals
2	Monaro Colts (U16s)	5	4	0	1	1	164	62	+102	10	Semi-Finals
3	Illawarra-South Coast Steelers (U16s)	5	2	0	3	1	146	90	+56	6	
4	Western Rams (U16s)	5	1	0	4	1	66	158	–92	4	
5	Riverina Bulls (U16s)	5	1	0	4	1	68	184	-116	4	

Updated to match(es) played on unknown. Source:
Rules for classification: 1) points; 2) point difference; 3) points scored

==== Ladder Progression ====
- Numbers highlighted in green indicate that the team finished the round inside the top 2.
- Numbers highlighted in red indicates the team finished last place on the ladder in that round.
- Underlined numbers indicate that the team had a bye during that round.

Pos	Team	1	2	3	4	5	6
Northern Conference
1	Newcastle-Maitland Region Knights (U16s)	2	4	6	8	10	12
2	North Coast Bulldogs (U16s)	0	0	2	4	6	8
3	Central Coast Roosters (U16s)	2	4	6	6	6	6
4	Northern Rivers Titans (U16s)	0	2	2	2	4	6
5	Northern Tigers (U16s)	0	0	0	2	2	2
Southern Conference
1	Macarthur-Wests Tigers (U16s)	2	4	6	8	10	12
2	Monaro Colts (U16s)	2	4	4	6	8	10
3	Illawarra-South Coast Steelers (U16s)	0	2	4	4	6	6
4	Western Rams (U16s)	0	0	2	4	4	4
5	Riverina Bulls (U16s)	2	2	2	2	2	4

Season Results:

Home	Score	Away	Match Information
Home	Score	Away	Date and Time	Venue	Referee	Video
Round 1 (Magic Round)
Monaro Colts (U16s)	30 – 10	Northern Rivers Titans (U16s)	Saturday, 31 January, 10:50am	Seiffert Oval	Jaylen Chasle
Macarthur-Wests Tigers (U16s)	40 – 22	North Coast Bulldogs (U16s)	Saturday, 31 January, 10:50am	David Campese Oval	Carter Spowert-Lehman
Northern Tigers (U16s)	30 – 34	Riverina Bulls (U16s)	Saturday, 31 January, 10:50am	Pirtek Park	Lachlan Gillies
Central Coast Roosters (U16s)	44 – 18	Western Rams (U16s)	Saturday, 31 January, 1:30pm	Seiffert Oval	Logan Nielsen
Newcastle-Maitland Region Knights (U16s)	20 – 12	Illawarra-South Coast Steelers (U16s)	Saturday, 31 January, 1:30pm	Pirtek Park	Alexsander Fitzgerald
Round 2
Central Coast Roosters (U16s)	24 – 16	Northern Tigers (U16s)	Saturday, 7 February, 10:00am	Woy Woy Oval	Ben Raymond
North Coast Bulldogs (U16s)	8 – 34	Newcastle-Maitland Region Knights (U16s)	Saturday, 7 February, 10:20am	Port Macquarie Regional Stadium	Nicholas Willer
Western Rams (U16s)	12 – 34	Illawarra-South Coast Steelers (U16s)	Saturday, 7 February, 1:00pm	Tony Luchetti Sportsground	Logan Nielsen
Riverina Bulls (U16s)	16 – 20	Macarthur-Wests Tigers (U16s)	Sunday, 8 February, 10:20am	GeoHex Park	Ruby Keen
Monaro Colts (U16s)	BYE	Northern Rivers Titans (U16s)
Round 3
Newcastle-Maitland Region Knights (U16s)	22 – 10	Northern Tigers (U16s)	Saturday, 14 February, 9:30am	Lakeside Sporting Complex	Jaylen Chasle
Northern Rivers Titans (U16s)	17 – 22	North Coast Bulldogs (U16s)	Saturday, 14 February, 10:00am	Crozier Field	Nicholas Willer
Macarthur-Wests Tigers (U16s)	22 – 14	Monaro Colts (U16s)	Saturday, 14 February, 11:00am	Kirkham Oval	Logan Nielsen
Illawarra-South Coast Steelers (U16s)	52 – 0	Riverina Bulls (U16s)	Sunday, 15 February, 10:00am	Centenary Field	Thomas Inness
Central Coast Roosters (U16s)	BYE	Western Rams (U16s)
Round 4
Newcastle-Maitland Region Knights (U16s)	34 – 12	Northern Rivers Titans (U16s)	Saturday, 21 February, 9:30am	Lakeside Sporting Complex	Tallon Irons
North Coast Bulldogs (U16s)	34 – 20	Central Coast Roosters (U16s)	Saturday, 21 February, 10:00am	Port Macquarie Regional Stadium	Nicholas Willer
Western Rams (U16s)	36 – 12	Riverina Bulls (U16s)	Saturday, 21 February, 10:00am	Jock Colley Oval	Reece Sammut
Illawarra-South Coast Steelers (U16s)	24 – 28	Monaro Colts (U16s)	Saturday, 21 February, 1:00pm	WIN Stadium	Thomas Inness
Macarthur-Wests Tigers (U16s)	BYE	Northern Tigers (U16s)
Round 5
Macarthur-Wests Tigers (U16s)	22 – 0	Western Rams (U16s)	Saturday, 28 February, 10:00am	Kirkham Oval	Thomas Inness
Northern Rivers Titans (U16s)	24 – 12	Central Coast Roosters (U16s)	Saturday, 28 February, 10:00am	Crozier Field	Nicholas Willer
Northern Tigers (U16s)	12 – 56	North Coast Bulldogs (U16s)	Saturday, 28 February, 12:10pm	Scully Park	Lachlan Gillies
Riverina Bulls (U16s)	6 – 46	Monaro Colts (U16s)	Sunday, 1 March, 12:20pm	Laurie Daley Oval	Reece Sammut
Newcastle-Maitland Region Knights (U16s)	BYE	Illawarra-South Coast Steelers (U16s)
Round 6
Central Coast Roosters (U16s)	14 – 18	Newcastle-Maitland Region Knights (U16s)	Saturday, 7 March, 9:30am	Woy Woy Oval	James Fitzgerald
Monaro Colts (U16s)	46 – 0	Western Rams (U16s)	Saturday, 7 March, 9:30am	Seiffert Oval	Will Flint
Illawarra-South Coast Steelers (U16s)	24 – 30	Macarthur-Wests Tigers (U16s)	Saturday, 7 March, 10:30am	Collegians Sports Stadium	Thomas Inness
Northern Rivers Titans (U16s)	0* – 0	Northern Tigers (U16s)	N/A
Riverina Bulls (U16s)	BYE	North Coast Bulldogs (U16s)
Finals Series
Semi-Finals
Macarthur-Wests Tigers (U16s)	28 – 14	North Coast Bulldogs (U16s)	Saturday, 21 March, 10:00am	Dudley Chesham Sports Ground	Will Flint
Newcastle-Maitland Region Knights (U16s)	32 – 26	Monaro Colts (U16s)	Saturday, 21 March, 1:00pm	Dudley Chesham Sports Ground	James Fitzgerald
Grand Final
Newcastle-Maitland Region Knights (U16s)	16 – 26	Macarthur-Wests Tigers (U16s)	Saturday, 28 March, 11:30am	Port Macquarie Regional Stadium	Carter-Spowert-Lehmann

=== Grand Final ===
Semi-Finals
1N	Newcastle-Maitland	32
2S	Monaro	26
1S	Macarthur-Wests	28
2N	North Coast	14

Grand Final
Newcastle-Maitland	16
Macarthur-Wests	26

2026 Andrew Johns Cup Grand Final

Saturday, 28 March 2026
11:30am

Newcastle-Maitland Region Knights (U16s)	16 – 26	Macarthur-Wests Tigers (U16s)

Port Macquarie Regional Stadium, Port Macquarie
Referee: Carter-Spowert-Lehmann
Touch judges: Lachlan Lucas & Nicholas Willer
